= TIK-301 =

Chemical compound

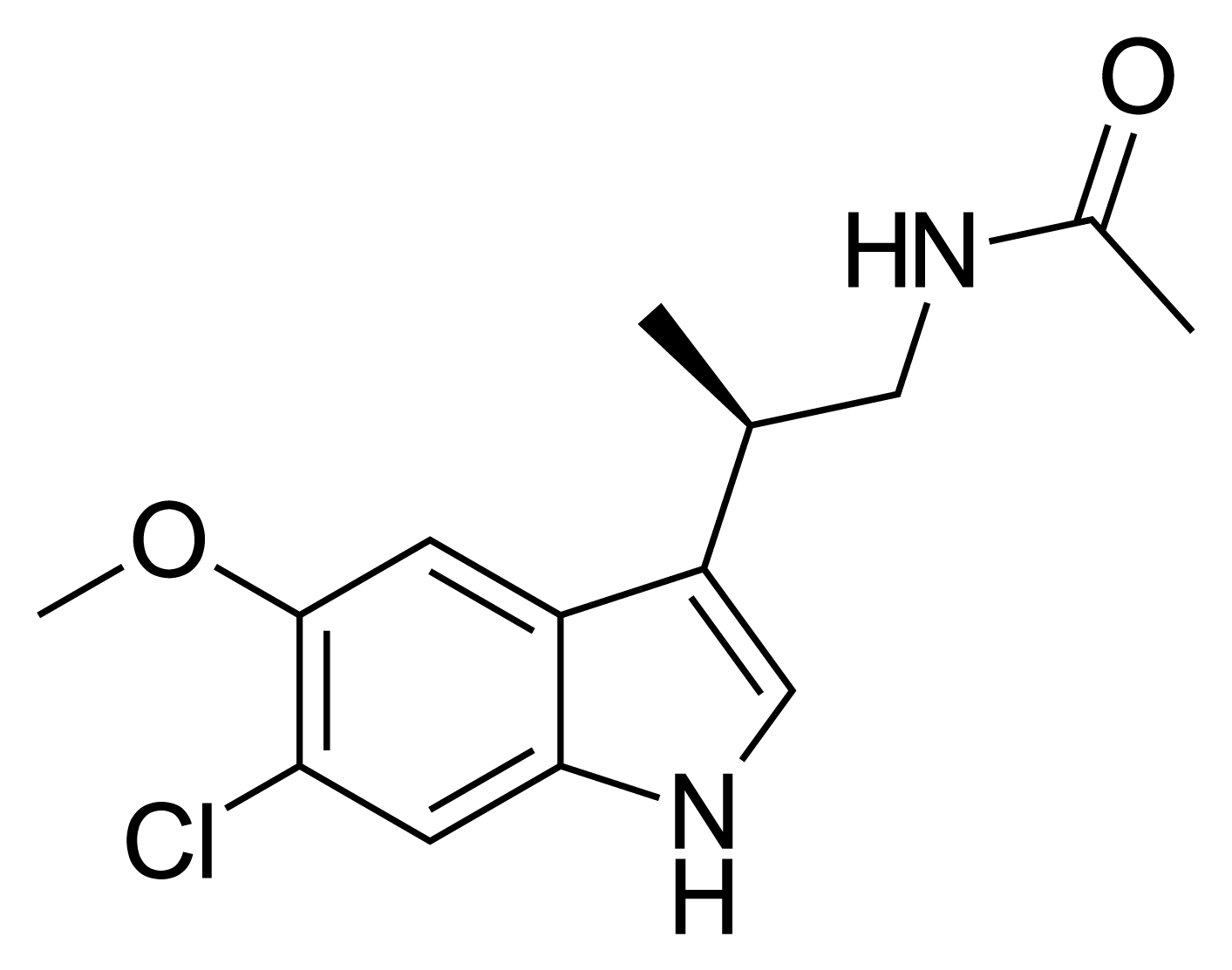

Clinical data
- Other names: TIK301; LY-156735; LY156735; PD-6735; PD6735; β-Methyl-6-chloromelatonin
- Routes of administration: Oral
- Drug class: Melatonin receptor agonist; Melatonin MT_{1} and MT_{2} receptor agonist

Legal status
- Legal status: Investigational

Pharmacokinetic data
- Elimination half-life: 1 hour

Identifiers
- IUPAC name: N-[(2R)-(6-Chloro-5-methoxy-1H-indol-3-yl)propyl]acetamide
- CAS Number: 118702-11-7
- PubChem CID: 219018
- IUPHAR/BPS: 1351
- ChemSpider: 189853
- UNII: 3ZX95B1ZWK
- ChEMBL: ChEMBL4079759
- CompTox Dashboard (EPA): DTXSID70922760

Chemical and physical data
- Formula: C_{14}H_{17}ClN_{2}O_{2}
- Molar mass: 280.75 g·mol^{−1}
- 3D model (JSmol): Interactive image
- SMILES: C[C@@H](CNC(=O)C)c1c[nH]c2c1cc(c(c2)Cl)OC
- InChI: InChI=1S/C14H17ClN2O2/c1-8(6-16-9(2)18)11-7-17-13-5-12(15)14(19-3)4-10(11)13/h4-5,7-8,17H,6H2,1-3H3,(H,16,18)/t8-/m0/s1; Key:RKHCTAKUYDTFHE-QMMMGPOBSA-N

TIK-301, also known as LY-156735 or PD-6735 or as β-methyl-6-chloromelatonin, is an agonist for the melatonin receptors MT_{1} and MT_{2} that is under development for the treatment of insomnia and other sleep disorders. Its agonist action on MT_{1} and MT_{2} receptors in the suprachiasmatic nucleus in the brain enables its action as a chronobiotic. It is in the same class of melatonin receptor agonists as ramelteon and tasimelteon.

== History and development ==
TIK-301 was first developed at Eli Lilly and Company in Indianapolis, Indiana, as LY-156735. In 2002, it was licensed by Phase 2 Discovery for further commercialization and worldwide development as PD-6735. In July 2007, the open Investigational New Drug (IND) was transferred to Tikvah Therapeutics in Atlanta, GA by Phase II Discovery, where it was renamed to TIK-301. Currently, clinical trials are ongoing there. Because it has been traded and sublicensed by multiple companies, it can be referred to by all three names. Mostly recently and commonly, it is referred to as TIK-301.

TIK-301 was in phase II clinical trials in 2002. In 2004, TIK-301 was designated an orphan drug by the FDA.

== Pharmacodynamics ==
TIK-301 is a high affinity nonselective MT_{1}/MT_{2} agonist. Studies show that it is more potent and more effective than melatonin. Its affinity for MT_{1} is similar to that of melatonin (pK_{i} =10.38, K_{i}=81pM) and its affinity for MT_{2} is slightly higher (pK_{i}=10.38, K_{i}= 42pM). This enantiomer had higher affinity for the binding site compared to the racemic mixture. The MT_{1}/MT_{2} K_{i} ratio is 1.9. This slight preference for MT_{2} receptor is common among melatonin derivatives with chlorine. TIK-301's action on MT_{1} and MT_{2} receptors contributes to its sleep-promoting effects because melatonin's effects at these same receptors is linked with maintenance of normal-sleep wake cycle. TIK-301 was shown to be effective at promoting sleep at various doses; there is a positive dose response relationship between dose and reduction in sleep latency. The EC_{50} of TIK-301 is 0.0479nM, compared to 0.063nM for melatonin. It also acts as an antagonist at serotonin receptors 5-HT_{2B} and 5-HT_{2C}.

== Pharmacokinetics ==
TIK-301 is administered orally. Compared to melatonin, it has nine times greater bioavailability and six times greater area under the curve (AUC), which means the body retains more of an administered dose. TIK-301 was detected in blood plasma within 10 to 15 minutes of administration of a single oral dose and remains in a patient's system until 12 hours after the single dose. Plasma concentrations increased rapidly and peaked at 1 hour after the dose, independent of dose size. TIK-301's half-life is about 1 hour. This extended half-life may be partially due to the chlorine in its structure. Elimination constants depended on dose, 20 mg dose had a different elimination constant from all other doses above 35 mg.

== Treatment ==
TIK-301 is intended to be a take-as-need drug for primary insomnia, circadian rhythm disorders, depression, as well as sleep disorders in blind individuals and can be used to alleviate neuroleptic-induced tardive dyskinesia in schizophrenia patients. In a phase I clinical trial, TIK-301 was shown to be effective as a chronobiotic at a dose of 5 mg/L, but not in lower doses. In a phase II trial for primary insomnia, patients experienced objective and subjective improvements in sleep latency at 20 mg (31% improvement), 50 mg (32%) and 100 mg (41%) doses. The sleep latency improvement at the 100 mg dose is comparable to FDA approved zolpidem's effects. Surprisingly, it showed no such effects in healthy patients when taken before bed. In a test of phase shifted circadian cycle, TIK-301 showed efficacy in readjusting phase shifts in all physiological systems. While it has been shown to be effective in phase shifting circadian rhythm and reduced sleep latency, it has not been shown to help sleep maintenance, even at doses of 20 mg or 200 mg.

In addition to a sleep aid, TIK-301 has been found useful in treating other disorders. Because of its affinity for serotonin receptors, it has potential to serve as a possible antidepressant drug, similar to agomelatine. TIK-301 has also been considered for use in patients with mild cognitive impairment (MCI) because of sleep disorder prevalence. TIK-301, as well as other melatonin agonists, has been reported to have potential in preventing or treating urinary incontinence, but have not been tested in humans for this purpose. It is also seen as a potential therapeutic agent for spinal cord injury (SCI); in low doses (10 mg/kg) it was seen to be benefit in rats after SCI, but in higher doses (100 mg/kg), it proved toxic.

== Side effects ==
There were no major and serious side effects in phase I trials, and mild side effects such as diarrhea, conjunctivitis and laryngitis were observed in few cases. Unlike benzodiazepines sleep medications, TIK-301's novel mode of action at melatonin receptors reduce many common side effects of sleep medications like dependency. In addition, TIK-301 had no latent, morning after psychomotor impairments. A few patients reported cases of somnolence in clinical trials, which is consistent with the drug's soporific effects.

Because of its receptor specific action, there are no associated changes in core body temperatures, heart rate or blood pressure as with other melatonin medications.

== See also ==
- List of investigational chronobiotics
