= List of investigational chronobiotics =

Investigational chronobiotic drugs

This is a list of investigational chronobiotics, or drugs that are currently under development for clinical use as chronobiotics—that is, for the treatment of circadian rhythm sleep disorders—but are not yet approved.

Chemical/generic names are listed first, with developmental code names, synonyms, and brand names in parentheses. The format of list items is "Name (Synonyms) – Mechanism of Action [Reference]".

This list was last comprehensively updated in September 2025. It is likely to become outdated with time.

== Under development ==
=== Phase 3 ===
- Solriamfetol (ADX-N05; ARL-N05; JZP-110; SKL-N05; Sunosi) – norepinephrine–dopamine reuptake inhibitor (NDRI) and trace amine-associated receptor 1 (TAAR1) agonist

=== Phase 2 ===
- Lemborexant (LEM; Dayvigo; E-2006) – orexin OX_{1} and OX_{2} receptor antagonist

=== Preclinical ===
- CT-1500 (CT1500) – adenosine A_{1} and A_{2A} receptor antagonist

== Not under development ==
=== No development reported ===
- TIK-301 (LY-156735; PD-6735; 6-chloro-β-methylmelatonin) – melatonin MT_{1} and MT_{2} receptor agonist and serotonin 5-HT_{2B} and 5-HT_{2C} receptor antagonist

=== Discontinued ===
- BIIB-118 (PF-5251749; PF-05251749) – casein kinase 1 epsilon (CK1ε) and delta (CK1δ) inhibitor
- LML-134 (LML134) – histamine H_{3} receptor antagonist
- Ramelteon (Rozerem; TAK-375) – melatonin MT_{1} and MT_{2} receptor agonist

== Clinically used drugs ==
=== Approved drugs ===
- Armodafinil (Nuvigil) – atypical dopamine reuptake inhibitor – specifically for shift work sleep disorder
- Modafinil (Provigil) – atypical dopamine reuptake inhibitor – specifically for shift work sleep disorder
- Tasimelteon (BMS-214778; Hetlioz; VEC-162) – melatonin MT_{1} and MT_{2} receptor agonist

=== Off-label drugs ===
- Antipsychotics (e.g., aripiprazole)
- Hypnotics (e.g., antihistamines, trazodone, orexin receptor antagonists, benzodiazepines, Z-drugs)
- Melatonin receptor agonists (e.g., melatonin, ramelteon, agomelatine)
- Vitamins (e.g., vitamin B_{12})
- Wakefulness-promoting agents and stimulants (e.g., caffeine, modafinil, armodafinil)

== See also ==
- Chronobiotic
- List of investigational drugs
- List of investigational insomnia drugs
- List of investigational narcolepsy and hypersomnia drugs
