= Melatonin as a medication and supplement =

Supplement and medication used to treat sleep disorders

Melatonin

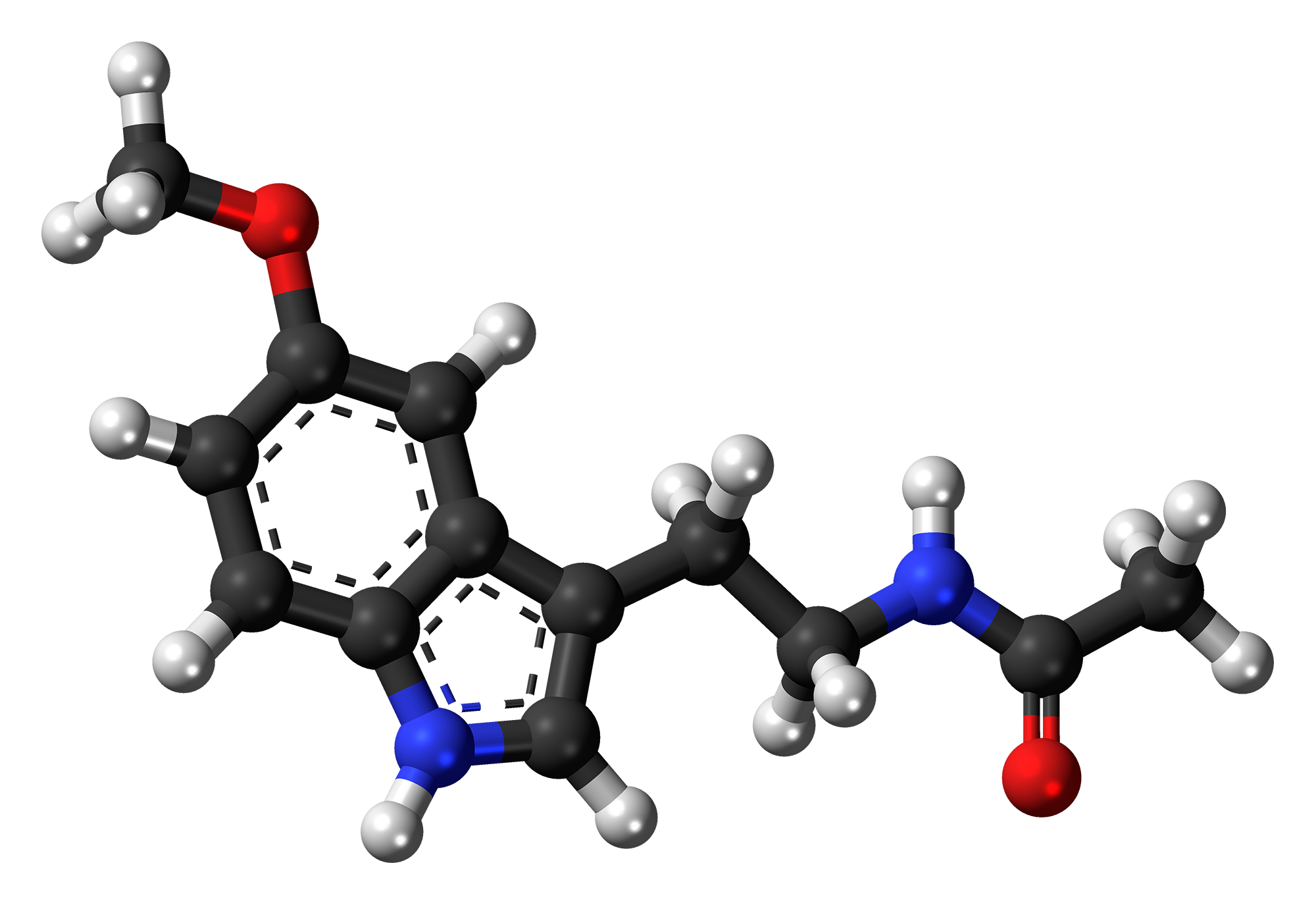

Clinical data
- Pronunciation: /ˌmɛləˈtoʊnɪn/
- Trade names: Circadin, Slenyto, others
- Other names: N-Acetyl-5-methoxy tryptamine; 5-Methoxy-N-acetyltryptamine; 5-MeO-NAcT
- AHFS/Drugs.com: Consumer Drug Information; MedFacts Natural Products
- License data: US DailyMed: Melatonin
- Pregnancy category: AU: B3
- Dependence liability: Physical: Low Psychological: None
- Addiction liability: None
- Routes of administration: Oral, sublingual
- Drug class: Melatonin receptor agonist
- ATC code: N05CH01 (WHO)

Physiological data
- Source tissues: Pineal gland
- Target tissues: Widespread, including brain, retina, and circulatory system
- Receptors: Melatonin receptor
- Precursor: N-Acetylserotonin
- Metabolism: Liver via CYP1A2 mediated 6-hydroxylation

Legal status
- Legal status: AU: S4 (Prescription only); CA: OTC / Rx-only; UK: POM (Prescription only); US: OTC; EU: Rx, OTC; In general: ℞ (Prescription only)

Pharmacokinetic data
- Bioavailability: ~15% (range 2.5–50%)
- Protein binding: 60%
- Metabolism: Liver via CYP1A2 mediated 6-hydroxylation
- Metabolites: 6-Hydroxymelatonin, N-acetyl-5-hydroxytryptamine, 5-methoxytryptamine
- Elimination half-life: IR: 20–60 minutes PR: 3.5–4 hours
- Duration of action: A few hours
- Excretion: Kidney

Identifiers
- IUPAC name: N-[2-(5-Methoxy-1H-indol-3-yl)ethyl]acetamide
- CAS Number: 73-31-4
- PubChem CID: 896
- IUPHAR/BPS: 224
- DrugBank: DB01065
- ChemSpider: 872
- UNII: JL5DK93RCL
- KEGG: D08170
- ChEBI: CHEBI:16796
- ChEMBL: ChEMBL45
- NIAID ChemDB: 160011

Chemical and physical data
- Formula: C_{13}H_{16}N_{2}O_{2}
- Molar mass: 232.283 g·mol^{−1}
- 3D model (JSmol): Interactive image
- Melting point: 117 °C (243 °F)
- SMILES: COC1=CC2=C(NC=C2CCNC(C)=O)C=C1
- InChI: InChI=1S/C13H16N2O2/c1-9(16)14-6-5-10-8-15-13-4-3-11(17-2)7-12(10)13/h3-4,7-8,15H,5-6H2,1-2H3,(H,14,16); Key:DRLFMBDRBRZALE-UHFFFAOYSA-N

Melatonin is a naturally occurring hormone produced in the brain that is also used as a dietary supplement and medication. As a hormone, melatonin is released by the pineal gland and is involved in sleep–wake cycles. As a supplement and medication, it is often used for the short-term treatment of disrupted sleep patterns such as from jet lag or shift work, and is typically taken orally.

Side effects from melatonin supplements are minimal at low doses for short durations (the studies reported that side effects occurred about equally for both melatonin and placebo). The most common side effects of using supplemental melatonin include headache, nausea, vivid dreams, and daytime drowsiness. Its use is not recommended during pregnancy or breastfeeding or for those with liver disease.

Melatonin acts as an agonist of the melatonin MT_{1} and MT_{2} receptors, the biological targets of endogenous melatonin. It is thought to activate these receptors in the suprachiasmatic nucleus of the hypothalamus in the brain to regulate the circadian clock and sleep–wake cycles. Immediate-release melatonin has a short elimination half-life of about 20 to 50 minutes. Prolonged-release melatonin used as a medication has a half-life of 3.5 to 4 hours.

Melatonin was discovered in 1958. It is sold over-the-counter in Canada and the United States; in the United Kingdom, it is a prescription-only medication. In Australia and the European Union, it is indicated for difficulty sleeping in people over the age of 54. Slenyto is a prolonged-release melatonin medicine used in the E.U. to treat insomnia in children and adolescents with autism spectrum disorder, neurogenetic disorders, or ADHD. The U.S. Food and Drug Administration (FDA) treats melatonin as a dietary supplement and, as such, has not approved it for any medical uses. It was approved for medical use in the European Union in 2007. Besides melatonin, certain synthetic melatonin receptor agonists like ramelteon, tasimelteon, and agomelatine are also used in medicine. In 2023, it was the 164th most commonly prescribed medication in the United States, with more than 3 million prescriptions.

== Medical uses ==
=== Insomnia ===
An extended-release pharmaceutical formulation of melatonin is approved under the brand name Circadin for the treatment of insomnia in certain settings, such as in people over 55 years of age. It is approved in the European Union, Israel, Australia, and countries in Asia and elsewhere in the world, but not in the United States (where it reached Phase III trials but was not approved). The medication has been licensed since 2007. Slenyto is a prolonged-release melatonin medicine used in the European Union to treat insomnia in children and adolescents with autism spectrum disorder, neurogenetic disorders, or ADHD.

The 2023 European Insomnia Guideline recommended use of prolonged-release melatonin for treatment of insomnia in people age 55 or older for up to 3 months. It recommended against fast-release or over-the-counter melatonin for treatment of insomnia. These recommendations were based on several meta-analyses published in 2022 and 2023.

The American Academy of Sleep Medicine's 2017 clinical practice guidelines recommended against the use of melatonin in the treatment of insomnia due to poor effectiveness and very low quality of evidence.

=== Circadian rhythm sleep disorders ===
Melatonin may be useful in the treatment of delayed sleep phase syndrome.

Melatonin is known to reduce jet lag, especially in eastward travel. However, if it is not taken at the correct time, it can instead delay adaptation.

Melatonin appears to have limited use against the sleep problems of people who work shift work. Tentative evidence suggests that it increases the length of time people are able to sleep.

Meta-analyses, published between 2005 and 2017, appear to show different results as to whether melatonin is effective for circadian rhythm sleep disorders or not. Some found that it was effective, while others found no evidence of effectiveness. Meta-analyses of melatonin for delayed sleep phase syndrome that found it effective have reported that it improves time to sleep onset by about 40 minutes (0.67 hours) and advances onset of endogenous melatonin secretion by about 1.2 hours (72 minutes). One meta-analysis found that melatonin was notably more effective in improving sleep onset latency in people with delayed sleep phase syndrome than in people with insomnia (improvement of 39 minutes vs. 7 minutes, respectively). One meta-analysis found that melatonin was probably effective for jet lag syndrome.

Low doses of melatonin may be advantageous to high doses in the treatment of sleep-cycle disorders.

=== REM sleep behavior disorder ===
Melatonin is a safer alternative than clonazepam in the treatment of REM sleep behavior disorder – a condition associated with the synucleinopathies like Parkinson's disease and dementia with Lewy bodies. However, clonazepam may be more effective. In any case, the quality of evidence for both treatments is very low and it is unclear whether either is definitely effective.

=== Available forms ===
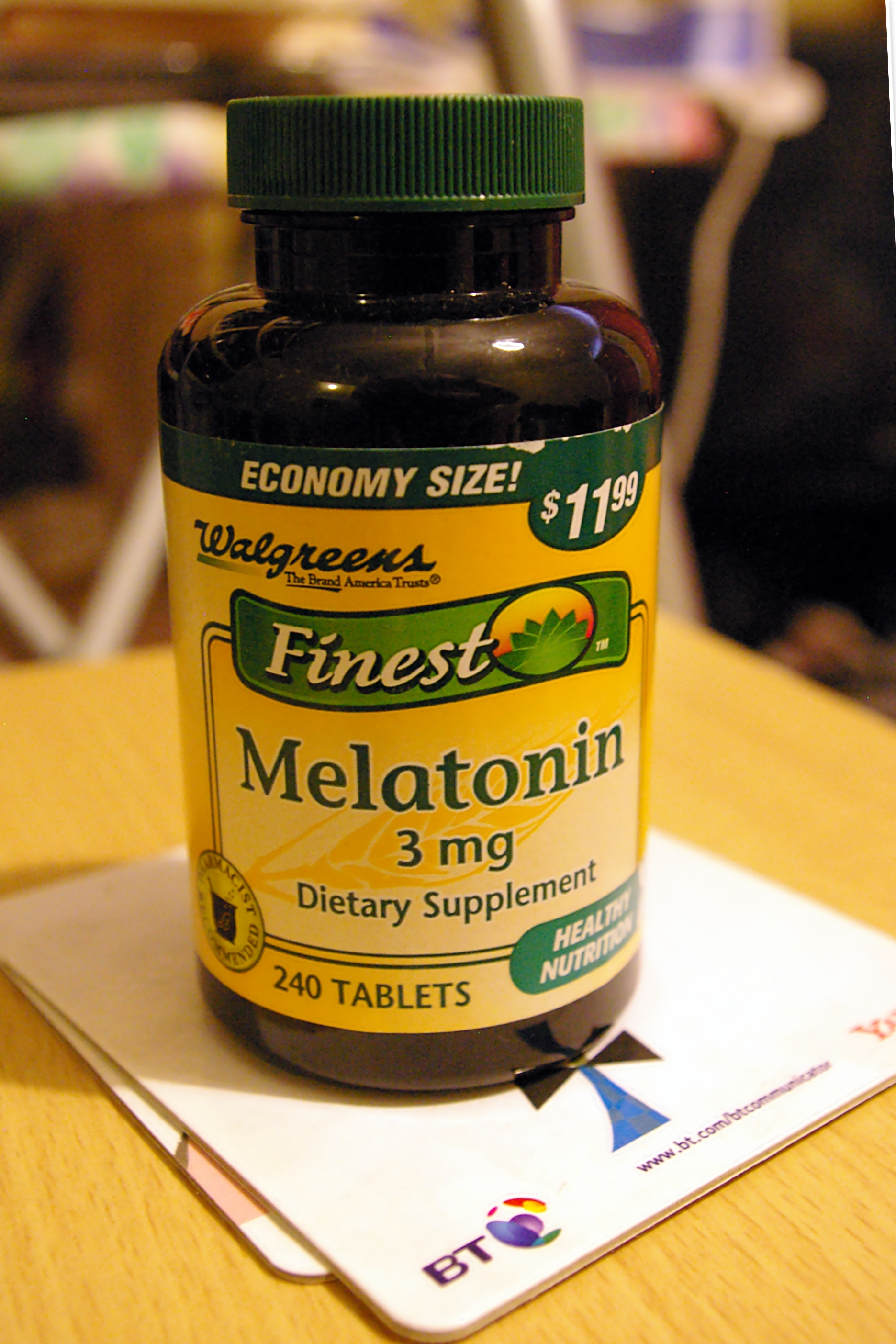
A bottle of melatonin tablets. Melatonin is also available in timed-release and in liquid forms.

A prolonged-release 2 mg oral formulation of melatonin sold under the brand name Circadin is approved for use in the European Union in the short-term treatment of insomnia in people age 55 and older.

Melatonin is also available as an over-the-counter dietary supplement in many countries. It is available in both immediate-release and less commonly prolonged-release forms. The compound is available in supplements at doses ranging from 0.3 mg to 10 mg or more. Immediate-release formulations of melatonin cause blood levels of melatonin to reach their peak in about an hour. The hormone may be administered orally, as capsules, gummies, tablets, oral films, or as a liquid. It is also available for use sublingually, or as transdermal patches. Several inhalation-based melatonin products with a wide range of doses are available but their safety remains to be evaluated.

The American Academy of Sleep Medicine (AASM) says that the melatonin content in unregulated (without a USP verified mark) supplements can diverge widely from the claimed amount; a study found that the melatonin content ranged from one half to four times the stated dose.

== Contraindications ==
Contraindications to the use of melatonin include hypersensitivity reactions among others. It is not recommended in people with autoimmune diseases due to lack of data in these individuals. Prolonged-release pharmaceutical melatonin (Circadin) contains lactose and should not be used in people with the lactase deficiency or glucose–galactose malabsorption. Use of melatonin is also not recommended in people who are pregnant or breastfeeding or in people with liver disease.

== Adverse effects ==
Melatonin appears to cause very few side effects as tested in the short term, up to three months, at low doses. Two systematic reviews found no adverse effects of exogenous melatonin in several clinical trials, and comparative trials found the adverse effects headaches, dizziness, nausea, and drowsiness were reported about equally for both melatonin and placebo. Prolonged-release melatonin is safe with long-term use of up to 12 months. Although not recommended for long-term use beyond this, low-dose melatonin is generally safer, and a better alternative, than many prescription and over-the-counter sleep aids if a sleeping medication must be used for an extended period of time. Low doses of melatonin are usually sufficient to produce a hypnotic effect in most people. Higher doses do not appear to result in a stronger effect but instead appear to cause drowsiness for a longer period of time.

There is emerging evidence that the timing of taking exogenous melatonin in relation to food is also an important factor. Specifically, taking exogenous melatonin shortly after a meal is correlated with impaired glucose tolerance. Therefore, Rubio-Sastre and colleagues recommend waiting at least 2 hours after the last meal before taking a melatonin supplement.

Melatonin can cause nausea, next-day grogginess, and irritability. In autoimmune disorders, evidence is conflicting whether melatonin supplementation may ameliorate or exacerbate symptoms due to immunomodulation.

Melatonin can lower follicle-stimulating hormone levels. Melatonin's effects on human reproduction remain unclear.

Some supplemental melatonin users report an increase in vivid dreaming. Extremely high doses of melatonin increased REM sleep time and dream activity in people both with and without narcolepsy.

Increased use of melatonin in the 21st century has significantly increased reports of melatonin overdose, calls to poison control centers, and related emergency department visits for children. The number of children who unintentionally ingested melatonin supplements in the US has increased 530% from 2012 to 2021. Over 4,000 reported ingestions required a hospital stay, and 287 children required intensive care. The American Academy of Sleep Medicine says there is little evidence that melatonin supplementation is effective in treating insomnia in healthy children.

== Overdose ==
Melatonin appears to be relatively safe in overdose. It has been administered at daily doses of up to 300 mg without causing clinically significant adverse reactions in the literature. However, doses of 200 to 1,200 mg daily were reported to cause sleeping and emotional problems. The most commonly reported adverse effect of melatonin overdose is somnolence. Upon melatonin overdose, drowsiness may be expected and the compound should be cleared within 12 hours. No special treatment is needed for melatonin overdose.

== Interactions ==
Melatonin is metabolized mainly by CYP1A enzymes. As such, inhibitors and inducers of CYP1A enzymes, such as CYP1A2, can modify melatonin metabolism and exposure. As an example, the CYP1A2 and CYP2C19 inhibitor fluvoxamine increases melatonin peak levels by 12-fold and overall exposure by 17-fold and this combination should be avoided. CYP1A2 inducers like cigarette smoking, carbamazepine, and rifampicin may reduce melatonin exposure due to induction of CYP1A2.

In those taking warfarin, some evidence suggests there may exist a potentiating interaction, increasing the anticoagulant effect of warfarin and the risk of bleeding.

== Pharmacology ==
=== Pharmacodynamics ===
Melatonin acts as an agonist of the melatonin MT_{1} and MT_{2} receptors, the biological targets of endogenous melatonin. Endogenous melatonin is normally secreted from the pineal gland of the brain. Melatonin is thought to activate melatonin receptors in the suprachiasmatic nucleus of the hypothalamus to regulate the circadian clock and sleep–wake cycles. When used several hours before sleep according to the phase response curve for melatonin in humans, small amounts (0.3 mg) of melatonin shift the circadian clock earlier, thus promoting earlier sleep onset and morning awakening.

Normal melatonin production is approximately 30 μg (0.03 mg) per day/night. In adults in temperate zones, the onset of melatonin secretion is around 21:00 to 22:00 h, the peak is around 02:00 to 04:00 h, and the offset is around 07:00 to 09:00 h. There is marked variability (e.g., 10-fold) in melatonin secretion and levels between individuals. Melatonin levels may decline with age. Doses of melatonin even above 300 μg (0.3 mg) have been shown to produce supraphysiological melatonin levels. Usual doses of exogenous melatonin of 1 to 12 mg produce circulating melatonin concentrations that are 10 to 100 times higher than endogenous peak levels, which remain elevated for 4 to 8 hours. Melatonin levels with Circadin, an approved 4-mg controlled-release pharmaceutical drug, are also supraphysiological. Clinical studies have found melatonin to have maximal effectiveness and the fewest side effects at a once-nightly dose of 0.3 mg. In elderly people, this dose resulted in similar melatonin spikes in magnitude and duration to those that occur in healthy young people.

Supraphysiological levels of melatonin have been found to rapidly and robustly desensitize and internalize the melatonin receptors, whereas physiological concentrations show reduced or even no effects in this regard. This might result in supraphysiological doses of melatonin being counterproductive and less effective than low or physiological doses.

=== Pharmacokinetics ===
==== Absorption ====
The oral bioavailability of melatonin ranges between 2.5% and 50%. In one study, the bioavailability of melatonin ranged from 10% to 56% between different individuals, with an average of 33%. A systematic review found that the bioavailability of melatonin was approximately 15%, with a range across studies of 9% to 33%.

Melatonin is rapidly absorbed and distributed, reaching peak plasma concentrations after 60 minutes of administration, and is then eliminated. A single 0.5 mg dose of melatonin achieved peak melatonin levels ranging between 2 and 395 nmol/L between different individuals.

==== Distribution ====
The plasma protein binding of melatonin is approximately 60%. It is mainly bound to albumin, α_{1}-acid glycoprotein, and high-density lipoprotein.

The membrane transport proteins that move melatonin across a membrane include, but are not limited to, glucose transporters, including GLUT1, and the proton-driven oligopeptide transporters PEPT1 and PEPT2.

==== Metabolism ====
Melatonin is metabolized in the liver by cytochrome P450 enzyme CYP1A2 to 6-hydroxymelatonin. Metabolites are conjugated with sulfuric acid or glucuronic acid for excretion in the urine. Some of the metabolites formed via the reaction of melatonin with a free radical include cyclic 3-hydroxymelatonin, N1-acetyl-N2-formyl-5-methoxykynuramine (AFMK), and N1-acetyl-5-methoxykynuramine (AMK).

==== Elimination ====
In humans, 90% of orally administered exogenous melatonin is cleared in a single passage through the liver, a small amount is excreted in urine, and a small amount is found in saliva. Melatonin is excreted in the urine 2 to 5% as the unchanged drug.

Melatonin has an elimination half-life of about 20 to 60 minutes. The half-life of prolonged-release melatonin (Circadin) is 3.5 to 4 hours.

== Chemistry ==
Melatonin, also known as N-acetyl-5-methoxytryptamine, is a substituted tryptamine and a derivative of serotonin (5-hydroxytryptamine). It is structurally related to N-acetylserotonin (normelatonin; N-acetyl-5-hydroxytryptamine), which is the chemical intermediate between serotonin and melatonin in the body. Synthetic melatonin receptor agonists used in medicine like ramelteon, tasimelteon, agomelatine, and piromelatine (still in clinical trials) are analogues of melatonin.

=== Synthesis ===
The chemical synthesis of melatonin has been described.

== Research ==
=== Dementia ===
A 2020 Cochrane review found no evidence that melatonin helped sleep problems in people with moderate to severe dementia due to Alzheimer's disease. A 2019 review found that while melatonin may improve sleep in minimal cognitive impairment, after the onset of Alzheimer's disease it has little to no effect. Melatonin may, however, help with sundowning (increased confusion and restlessness at night) in people with dementia.

=== Pain ===
A 2026 meta-analysis concluded that people taking melatonin supplements may experience relief from musculoskeletal pain similar in magnitude to the effects of typical analgesics. Although melatonin may be considered as an adjunct option for pain relief, it had only modest effects, and the quality of evidence for efficacy was low to moderate.

== History ==
The first patent for its use in circadian rhythm disorders was granted in 1987 to Roger V Short and Stuart Armstrong at Monash University, and the first patent for its use as a low-dose sleep aid was granted to Richard Wurtman at MIT in 1995. Around the same time, the hormone got a lot of press as a possible treatment for many illnesses. The New England Journal of Medicine editorialized in 2000: "With these recent careful and precise observations in blind persons, the true potential of melatonin is becoming evident, and the importance of the timing of treatment is becoming clear."

It was approved for medical use in the European Union in 2007.

== Society and culture ==
Melatonin is categorized by the US Food and Drug Administration (FDA) as a dietary supplement, and is sold over-the-counter in both the US and Canada. FDA regulations applying to medications are not applicable to melatonin, though the FDA has found claims that it cures cancer to be false. As melatonin may cause harm in combination with certain medications or in the case of certain disorders, a doctor or pharmacist should be consulted before making a decision to take melatonin. In many countries, melatonin is recognized as a neurohormone and it cannot be sold over-the-counter. According to Harriet Hall, caution is advisable, since quality control is a documented problem, particularly with respect to discrepancies between actual and label-stated dosage. To make matters worse, in one study, 8 out of 31 products were contaminated with the neurotransmitter serotonin.

Formerly, melatonin was derived from animal (e.g., bovine) pineal tissue. It is now synthetic, which limits the risks of contamination and of transmitting infectious material.

Melatonin is the most popular over-the-counter sleep remedy in the United States, with sales in excess of US$400 million during 2017. In 2022, it was the 217th most commonly prescribed medication in the United States, with more than 1 million prescriptions.

Beverages and snacks containing melatonin were being sold in grocery stores, convenience stores, and clubs in May 2011. The FDA considered whether these food products could continue to be sold with the label "dietary supplements". On 13 January 2010, it issued a warning letter to Innovative Beverage, creators of several such products, stating that melatonin, while legal as a dietary supplement, was not approved as a food additive. Bebida Beverage Company received a warning letter in 2015 for selling a melatonin-containing beverage.

== Research ==
Some research supports an antidepressant and anxiolytic effect of melatonin. It has also been used to aid in the treatment of manic episodes in bipolar disorder, although evidence for its effectiveness is still inconsistent.

Other studies have shown that melatonin may help reduce some types of headaches, epigastric pain and heartburn. There have also been studies trying to prove the effectiveness of melatonin in relation to epilepsy, dysmenorrhea, delirium, and tinnitus, but little to no beneficial role has been found. Melatonin has also been tested as a treatment for cancer, but the National Cancer Institute found insufficient evidence for it. However, further research found it to slightly improve survival of patients and to alleviate chemotherapy-related side effects.

Melatonin has been found to possess anti-inflammatory effects. It has been found to reduce levels of several pro-inflammatory cytokines in clinical studies, with large effect sizes. Melatonin might be useful in the treatment of inflammatory disorders.
