= 6-Sulfatoxymelatonin =

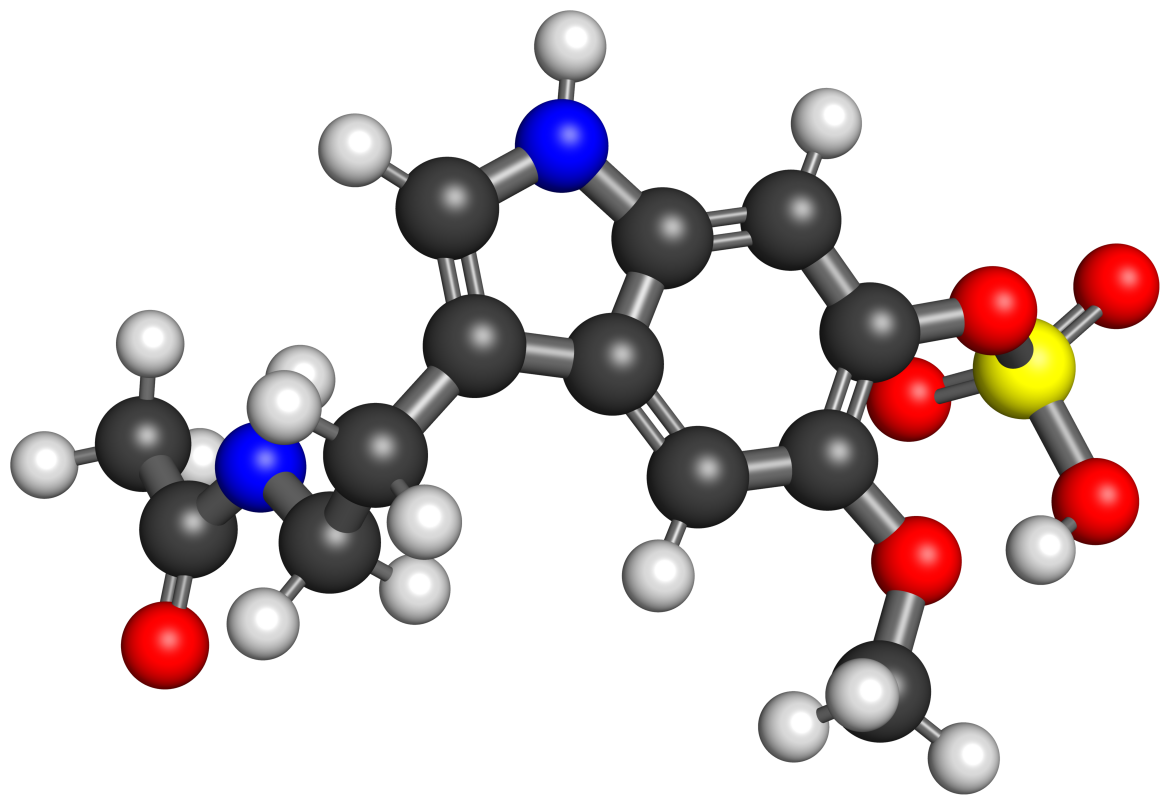

Names
- IUPAC name [3-(2-acetamidoethyl)-5-methoxy-1H-indol-6-yl] hydrogen sulfate
- Other names: aMT6s; 6-Sulphatoxymelatonin; 6-Hydroxymelatoninsulfate

Identifiers
CAS Number	2208-40-4
3D model (JSmol)	Interactive image
ChEBI	CHEBI:185936
ChemSpider	58606
DrugBank	DBMET00763
MeSH	6-sulfatoxymelatonin
PubChem CID	65096
UNII	XS8Z7GXT5E
CompTox Dashboard (EPA)	DTXSID40176576
- InChI: InChI=1S/C13H16N2O6S/c1-8(16)14-4-3-9-7-15-11-6-13(21-22(17,18)19)12(20-2)5-10(9)11/h5-7,15H,3-4H2,1-2H3,(H,14,16)(H,17,18,19) Key: QQEILXDLZRLTME-UHFFFAOYSA-N
- SMILES: CC(=O)NCCC1=CNC2=CC(=C(C=C21)OC)OS(=O)(=O)O

Properties
Chemical formula	C_{13}H_{16}N_{2}O_{6}S
Molar mass	328.34 g·mol^{−1}
- Except where otherwise noted, data are given for materials in their standard state (at 25 °C [77 °F], 100 kPa). Infobox references

6-Sulfatoxymelatonin (also known as aMT6s, 6-Hydroxymelatoninsulfate, 6-sulphatoxymelatonin) is the conjugated sulfate and end-metabolite of its precursor 6-hydroxymelatonin (6-OHM), and is the major metabolite of the pineal gland hormone and neurotransmitter melatonin; it is excreted in urine and feces. Measuring aMT6s levels in urine or feces can be correlated with the patient's blood melatonin level and states of human circadian rhythms. In clinical practice, the non-invasive method of analysis for 6-sulfatoxymelatonin is a widely used method, usually measured using radioimmunoassay (RIA) or enzyme-linked immunosorbent assay (ELISA).

Measuring aMT6s, often in the first morning or day void, is used to diagnose melatonin deficiency, study sleep disorders, and track circadian phase changes. A 13-month study of 16 healthy volunteers demonstrated that while total daily excretion of 6-sulfatoxymelatonin remained stable, its circadian rhythm showed significant seasonal shifts; specifically, the peak secretion occurred 1.5 hours earlier in summer than in winter. Pinealectomy performed on rats showed that the pineal gland is the main source of 6-sulfatoxymelatonin, continuous light exposure eliminates the nocturnal surge in aMT6s activity.

== Bioсhemistry ==
In the liver, plasma melatonin is primarily metabolized by cytochrome P450 (CYP) enzymes. The main isoenzyme responsible for 6-hydroxylation is CYP1A2, with contributions from CYP1A1 and CYP1B1. This process forms 6-hydroxymelatonin, which is then rapidly conjugated with sulfate by SULT1A1 to form 6-sulfatoxymelatonin, in turn, aMT6s is the end point in melatonin metabolism. This disproportionate accumulation suggests that the sulfate conjugate may not be easily released into the bloodstream due to its electrical charge, or it may perform a yet-to-be-identified neuromodulatory role within the CNS.

The presence of various sulfotransferases in the brain, which conjugate catecholamines, xenobiotics and neurosteroids, supports the possibility of local aMT6s formation. While its physiological role remains a subject of research, some hypotheses suggest it could function similarly to neurosteroid sulfates.

As it became known, 6-sulfatoxymelatonin may decrease in urine with biological aging, production disturbances may be associated with aging of the pineal gland and disruption of circadian rhythms.

== Exogenous sources ==
Consumption of melatonin from tropical fruits altered urinary 6-sulfatoxymelatonin excretion, 6 tropical foods increased urinary metabolite levels, with significant increases in urinary aMT6-s concentrations observed after consumption of pineapple (266%, p=0.004), banana (180%, p=0.001), and orange (47%, p=0.007). Ingestion of Prunus cerasus (especially "Montmorency" variety) juice concentrate significantly increased urinary 6-sulfatoxymelatonin concentrations.

== Chronic diseases ==
In concomitant or chronic diseases, urinary 6-sulfatoxymelatonin levels are often significantly reduced. Diabetic retinopathy is thought to be associated with dysregulation of melatonin, possibly due to dysfunction of melanopsin-expressing photosensitive retinal ganglion cells; accordingly, patients with diabetic retinopathy and type 2 diabetes had low nocturnal aMT6s production, which likely contributed to sleep disturbances, possibly due to weak circadian signaling, patients with type 2 diabetes but without diabetic retinopathy showed higher results; also, patients with type 2 diabetes and diabetic retinopathy reported lower sleep quality. AMT6s may decrease with complications and diabetes itself. In other studies, patients with growth hormone deficiency have been shown to have lower levels of aMT6s in urine.

Disturbances in the daily dynamics of 6-sulfatoxymelatonin excretion are characteristic of patients with Fabry disease, but the association of this indicator with obesity and metabolic markers in children has not been confirmed, as have all studies on the direct association of aMT6s with obesity in this age group.
