= Semi-field study =

A semi-field study or semifield study is a type of scientific investigation which is intermediate between laboratory study and open field research. This may be in a large enclosure in a lab, mixing some of the greater space of a field with the greater control, difficulty of escape, ease of access, predictable environment, and lowered chance of accidental escape of the lab; or an enclosure in a field, combining the realistic biotic and abiotic features of the field environment with some of the difficulty of escape of the lab setting.

== Regulation ==
Semi-field studies are sometimes encouraged - directly and indirectly - by legislation which prohibits non-target effects of pesticides. For example, although arthropods are common legitimate targets, honey bees are widely agreed to be beneficial to humans and often protected.
