= CodeCheck =

Mobile app that shows ingredient information

CodeCheck is a mobile app that provides consumers with information about the ingredients in cosmetic products, as well as the ingredients and nutritional values of food. Users can access this information by scanning the product’s barcode with a smartphone or by using a text-based search. The app is available for iOS and Android devices in Germany, Austria, Switzerland, the United Kingdom, the United States, and the Netherlands.

== History ==
CodeCheck was founded in 2010 as an association, online database, and app by Roman Bleichenbacher, who was then a student in Zurich. A website of the same name had already been launched in 2002, where users could enter information about ingredients, nutritional values, and manufacturers of products. The first round of financing took place in July 2014 and raised over 1.1 million Swiss francs, which coincided with the founding of CodeCheck AG. Investors included Doodle founders Myke Näf and Paul E. Sevinç. The company subsequently expanded to Austria and Germany. In the same year, Boris Manhart became CEO. CodeCheck GmbH was established in Berlin in 2016. The app became available in the United States in 2017 and in the United Kingdom in November 2019. In 2020, it was also launched in the Netherlands. Following insolvency proceedings, the app has been owned by Producto Check GmbH since 2022.

== Functions ==
The app can be used to scan the barcode of food and cosmetic products. It then displays information about ingredients, nutritional values, manufacturers and certification labels. For many years, users were able to enter and edit product information themselves and indicate advantages and disadvantages of individual products. Since 2020, the app has placed greater emphasis on machine text recognition. The collected data is combined with substance ratings using an algorithm. These ratings are based on scientific studies and expert assessments, including those from the Consumer Advice Centre in Hamburg, Greenpeace, the WWF and the German Association for the Environment and Nature Conservation (BUND e. V.), and cannot be modified by users or manufacturers.

The app also provides information on the sugar and fat content of food products. In addition, it indicates whether a product contains hormone-active substances, microplastics, palm oil, animal-derived ingredients, lactose or gluten. Since 2020, the app has displayed a climate score for food products in cooperation with the Eaternity Institute.

== Financing ==
CodeCheck is primarily financed through native advertising and banner ads. Since 2018, the company has also offered analysis services and survey tools directly to fast-moving consumer goods (FMCG) manufacturers. In addition, access to the API is available, enabling other companies to use the product database.

With the introduction of a subscription model in 2019, the CodeCheck app can be used ad-free and in offline mode. Since 2021, CodeCheck has also offered its own “Green Label” certification for manufacturers. Products are certified if at least 90 percent of their ingredients are classified as harmless.

== Awards ==
In May 2015, the app topped the download charts for the first time, reaching 2.3 million installations. By September 2019, the app had once again reached the top of the German app charts, surpassing five million downloads.
