= Melatonin receptor agonist =

Chemical activating melatonin receptors

- Drug class
- Melatonin, the prototypical melatonin receptor agonist

Class identifiers
- Use: Sleep disorders, depression, ADHD, etc.
- ATC code: N05CH
- Biological target: Melatonin receptor

Clinical data
- WebMD: RxList

External links
- MeSH: D008550

Legal status

Melatonin receptor agonists are analogues of melatonin that bind to and activate the melatonin receptor. Agonists of the melatonin receptor have a number of therapeutic applications including treatment of sleep disorders and depression. The discovery and development of melatonin receptor agonists was motivated by the need for more potent analogues than melatonin, with better pharmacokinetics and longer half-lives. Melatonin receptor agonists were developed with the melatonin structure as a model.

The melatonin receptors are G protein-coupled receptors and are expressed in various tissues of the body. There are two subtypes of the receptor in humans, melatonin receptor 1 (MT_{1}) and melatonin receptor 2 (MT_{2}). Melatonin and melatonin receptor agonists, on market or in clinical trials, all bind to and activate both receptor types. The binding of the agonists to the receptors has been investigated since 1986, yet is still not fully understood. When melatonin receptor agonists bind to and activate their receptors it causes numerous physiological processes.

== History ==
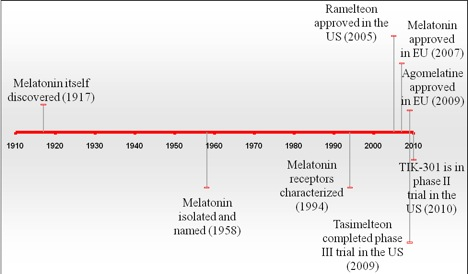
Melatonin timeline to about 2010

In 1917 McCord and Allen discovered melatonin itself. In 1958, Aaron B. Lerner and his colleagues isolated the substance N-acetyl-5-methoxytryptamine and named it melatonin. High-affinity melatonin binding sites were pharmacologically characterized in the bovine brain in 1979. The first melatonergic receptor was cloned from melanophores of Xenopus laevis in 1994. In 1994-1995 the melatonin receptors were characterized and cloned in the human being by Reppert and colleagues.

TIK-301 (PD-6735, LY-156735) has been in phase II clinical trial in the United States (US) since 2002. The FDA granted TIK-301 orphan drug designation in May 2004, to use as a treatment for circadian rhythm sleep disorder in blind individuals without light perception and individuals with tardive dyskinesia. In 2005 ramelteon (Rozerem) was approved in the US indicated for treatment of insomnia, characterized as difficulty with falling asleep, in adults. Melatonin in the form of prolonged release (trade name Circadin) was approved in 2007 in Europe (EU) for use as a short-term treatment, in patients 55 years or older, for primary insomnia (poor quality of sleep). Products containing melatonin are available as a dietary supplement in the United States and Canada. In 2009 agomelatine (Valdoxan, Melitor, Thymanax) was also approved in Europe and is indicated for the treatment of major depressive disorder in adults. Tasimelteon completed the phase III clinical trial in the United States for primary insomnia in 2010. The Food and Drug Administration (FDA) granted tasimelteon orphan drug designation status for blind individuals without light perception with non-24-hour sleep–wake disorder in January the same year, and final FDA approval for the same purpose was achieved in January 2014 under the trade name Hetlioz.

== Melatonin receptors ==
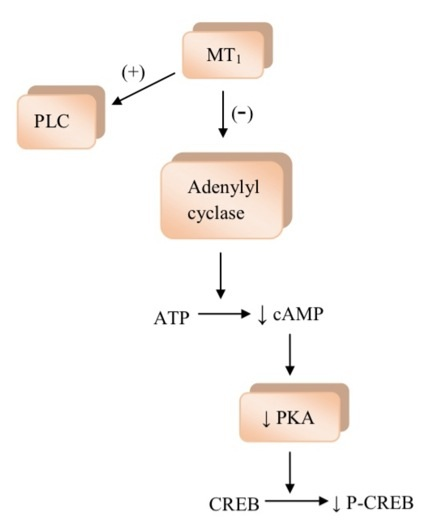
MT_{1} melatonin receptor signaling

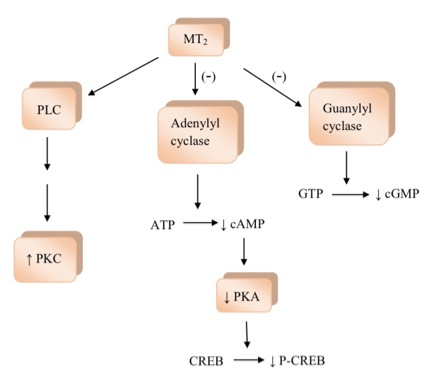
MT_{2} melatonin receptor signaling

In humans there are two subtypes of melatonin receptors targeted by melatonin agonists, MT_{1} and MT_{2}. They are G protein-coupled receptors and are expressed in various tissues of the body, together or singly. MT_{1} receptors are expressed in many regions of the central nervous system (CNS): suprachiasmatic nucleus (SCN) of the hypothalamus, hippocampus, substantia nigra, cerebellum, central dopaminergic pathways, ventral tegmental area and nucleus accumbens. MT_{1} is also expressed in the retina, ovary, testis, mammary gland, coronary circulation and aorta, gallbladder, liver, kidney, skin and the immune system. MT_{2} receptors are expressed mainly in the CNS, also in the lung, cardiac, coronary and aortic tissue, myometrium and granulosa cells, immune cells, duodenum and adipocytes.

=== Mechanism of action ===
The binding of melatonin to melatonin receptors activates a few signaling pathways. MT_{1} receptor activation inhibits the adenylyl cyclase and its inhibition causes a rippling effect of non activation; starting with decreasing formation of cyclic adenosine monophosphate (cAMP), and then progressing to less protein kinase A (PKA) activity, which in turn hinders the phosphorylation of cAMP responsive element-binding protein (CREB binding protein) into P-CREB. MT_{1} receptors also activate phospholipase C (PLC), affect ion channels and regulate ion flux inside the cell. The binding of melatonin to MT_{2} receptors inhibits adenylyl cyclase which decreases the formation of cAMP. As well it hinders guanylyl cyclase and therefore the forming of cyclic guanosine monophosphate (cGMP). Binding to MT_{2} receptors probably affects PLC which increases protein kinase C (PKC) activity. Activation of the receptor can lead to ion flux inside the cell.

When melatonin receptor agonists activate their receptors it causes numerous physiological processes. MT_{1} and MT_{2} receptors may be a target for the treatment of circadian and non circadian sleep disorders because of their differences in pharmacology and function within the SCN. The SCN is responsible for maintaining the 24 hour cycle which regulates many different body functions ranging from sleep to immune functions. Melatonin receptors have been identified in the cardiovascular system. Evidence from animal studies points to a dual role of melatonin in the vasculature. Activation of MT_{1} receptors mediates vasoconstriction and the activation of MT_{2} receptors mediates vasodilation. Melatonin is involved in regulating immune responses in both human and animals through activation of both MT_{1} and MT_{2} receptors. MT_{1} and MT_{2} receptors are widespread in the eye and are involved in regulating aqueous humor secretion, which is important for glaucoma, and in phototransduction. This is not a complete list since many of the possible processes need further confirmation.

== Drug design and development ==
Receptors and the structure of melatonin are known. Therefore, researchers started to investigate modulations of the core structure to develop better agonists than melatonin; more potent, with better pharmacokinetics and longer half-life. TIK-301 (Figure 1) is an agonist of the early classes. It is very similar to melatonin and has made it to clinical trials. This led to further research on the molecule, mainly substitution of the aromatic ring. Various modulations showed promising activity, especially the naphthalene ring which is present in agomelatine (Figure 1). Other ring systems have also showed melatonin agonist activity. Amongst them are indane which is present in ramelteon (Figure 1) and the ring system of tasimelteon (Figure 1).

=== Structure-activity relationship ===
The general structure of melatonin is the indole ring with methoxy group in position 5 (5-methoxy group) and acylaminoethyl side-chain in position 3. The two side-chains are important for binding to and activating the receptors. The indole ring has been evaluated at all positions by the effect of substitutions as seen in Figure 1. Each position is further explained below:

Position	Abbreviation	Action
1	R_{1}	Possible to substitute with small groups like methyl without little changes in binding affinity. Bulky groups lower binding affinity and intrinsic activity.
2	R_{2}	Addition of iodine, bromine and phenyl functional groups lead to agonists with higher binding affinity of approximately ten-fold.
3	R_{3}	The acylaminoethyl side-chain is important, as mentioned before. In this position it is possible to control agonist and antagonist activity.
4	R_{4}	Often involved in ring closure in melatonin agonists, although this position has been poorly investigated.
5	R_{5}	The methoxy group is important, as mentioned before. Substitution with halogens, such as chlorine (Cl) and bromine (Br) has shown lower binding affinity. Moving the methoxy group to other positions on the indole ring, e.g. 4, 6 or 7, leads to lower binding affinity.
6	R_{6}	Substitution leads to lower binding affinity, but this position is important for the pharmacokinetics. The main metabolite in vivo is 6-hydroxymelatonin.
7	R_{7}	Introduction of groups at this position generally leads to lower binding affinity.
β	R_{β}	Possible to substitute with small groups like methyl without little changes in binding affinity. Bulkier groups lower binding affinity.

SAR

Melatonin

Ramelteon

Agomelatine

Tasimelteon

TIK-301

Figure 1: Melatonin receptor agonists. The applied colors indicate the mutual properties with the general melatonin receptor agonists pharmacophore.

=== Binding and pharmacophore ===
2-Iodomelatonin was synthesized in 1986 and its radioligand, 2-[^{125}I]-melatonin, has been useful in finding cellular targets of melatonin. Though the melatonin receptor was not characterized and cloned in the human being until 1994 it was possible to start carrying out binding studies in various tissues before that time. As mentioned in the structure-activity relationship chapter above, certain groups are important for the activity. The most important groups are the 5-methoxy group and the acylaminoethyl side-chain, because they bind to and activate the receptors. The –NH group of the indole ring is not important for binding and activation. In fact, it is possible to replace the indole with other aromatic ring systems (naphthalene, benzofuran, benzothiazole, indane, tetraline, tetrahydroquinolines). An example of approved drug with naphthalene ring is agomelatine. The aromatic ring and the ethyl side-chain hold the correct distance between those two groups, as the correct distance is the key to good binding and more important than what type of aromatic ring system the analogue contains. Therefore, it is possible to use different ring systems in melatonin receptor analogues, if the distance is right. Furthermore, the aromatic ring can be substituted with different flexible scaffolds, such as phenyl-propilamides, O-phenoxy-ethylamides or N-anilino-ethylamides. The ethylamide chain of these ligands has been thought having a bioactive conformation with said chain projecting outside of the indole plane and it was demonstrated by testing rigidified analogues. Substituents in positions 1 or 2 of the indole scaffold projecting outside of the aromatic cycle plane increase selectivity toward the MT_{2} receptor, resulting in the most selective melatonin receptor ligands and simultaneously reducing receptor activation.

The melatonin receptors consist of proteins around 40 kDa each. The MT_{1} receptor encodes 350 amino acids and the MT_{2} encodes 362 amino acids. The binding of melatonin and its analogues is now understood through X-ray crystal structures published in 2019. The binding space for melatonin and analogues on the MT_{1} receptor is smaller than on the MT_{2}. Investigations usually focus on two binding pockets, for the two side-chains. The binding pocket of the 5-methoxy group is more investigated than the other pocket. Researchers agree that the oxygen in the group binds to histidine (His) residues in transmembrane 5 (TM5) domain of the receptor with a hydrogen bond; His195^{5.46} in MT_{1} and His208^{5.46} in MT_{2}. Another amino acid, Val192, also participates in the binding of the 5-methoxy group by binding to the methyl portion of the group. His195^{5.46} has also been proposed as important for receptor activation.

The binding of the N-acetyl group is more complex and less known. The important amino acids in the binding pocket for this group differ between the two receptors. Serines, Ser110 and Ser114, in the TM3 domain seem to be important for binding to the MT_{1} receptor. However, asparagine 175 (Asn) in the TM4 domain is likely to be important for the MT_{2} receptor. The aromatic ring system in melatonin and analogues most likely contributes some binding affinity by binding to aromatic rings of the amino acids phenylalanine (Phe) and tryptophan (Trp) in the receptor. The bonds that form are van der Waals interactions. The N-acetyl binding and binding pocket, binding of the ring system and important domains are somewhat known and need further investigation.

In past years, mutagenesis of residues involved in the binding site was not fully successful in the determination of the polar key contacts established by the methoxy group and the ethyl-amide side chain. Asn162/175^{4.60} and the Gln181/194, belonging to the ECL2, bind the methoxy and the ethyl-amide groups, respectively. The importance of His195/208^{5.46} could be related to the receptor activation, since cryo-electron microscopy structures of the ternary complexes of the receptor show that the residues enters the binding site, near the "toggle-switch" residue Trp6.48.

Carbamate insecticides target human melatonin receptors. Despite its structural similarities with melatonin, serotonin is not able to bind melatonin receptor due to the polar first amine group and the lack of an aspartate in position 3.32 within melatonin receptor orthosteric site.

== Current status ==
There are three melatonin agonists on the market today (February 2014); ramelteon (Rozerem), agomelatine (Valdoxan, Melitor, Thymanax) and tasimelteon (Hetlioz). Ramelteon was developed by Takeda Pharmaceutical Company and approved in the United States in 2005. Agomelatine was developed by the pharmaceutical company Servier and approved in Europe 2009. Tasimelteon was developed by Vanda Pharmaceuticals and completed the phase III trial in 2010. It was approved by the FDA on January 31, 2014, for the treatment of non-24-hour sleep–wake disorder in totally blind individuals.

One melatonin agonist has received orphan drug designation and is going through clinical trials in the United States: TIK-301. Originally TIK-301 was developed by Eli Lilly and Company and called LY-156,735, it wasn't until July 2007 that Tikvah Pharmaceuticals took over the development and named it TIK-301. It is now in phase II trials and has been since 2002. In July 2010 in Europe, prolonged-release melatonin (Circadin, Neurim Pharmaceuticals) was approved for use for 13 weeks for insomnia patients over 55 years old. Additionally, Neurim Pharmaceuticals reported the results of a positive phase II trial of its investigational compound piromelatine (Neu-P11) in February 2013.

No antagonists or selective ligands are currently reported in clinical studies.

Several characteristics of approved receptor agonists and orphan drug agonists
	Circadin	Ramelteon	Agomelatine	Tasimelteon	TIK-301
Binding affinity	—	MT_{1}: Ki = 0.014 nM; MT_{2}: Ki = 0.045 nM	MT_{1}: Ki = 0.062 nM; MT_{2}: Ki = 0.268 nM; 5-HT_{2C}: IC50 = 270 nM*	MT_{1}: Ki = 0.35 nM; MT_{2}: Ki = 0.17 nM	MT_{1}: Ki = 0.081nM; MT_{2}: Ki = 0.042 nM
Bioavailability	15%	< 2%	< 5%	not determined in humans	—
Half-life	40–50 min 3.5–4 h (terminal)	1–2 h	1–2 h	0.9–1.7 h 0.8–5.9 h (terminal)	—
Protein binding	60%	82%	95%	89–90%	—
Volume of distribution	—	73.6 L	35 L	56–126 L	—
Company	Neurim Pharmaceuticals	Takeda Pharmaceutical Company	Servier	Vanda Pharmaceuticals	Tikvah Pharmaceuticals
*Serotonin antagonist.
