= 6-Hydroxymelatonin =

Names
- Preferred IUPAC name N-[2-(6-Hydroxy-5-methoxy-1H-indol-3-yl)ethyl]acetamide
- Other names 6-Oxymelatonin

Identifiers
| CAS Number | 2208-41-5 |
| 3D model (JSmol) | Interactive image |
| ChEBI | CHEBI:198 |
| ChemSpider | 1794 |
| ECHA InfoCard | 100.164.426 |
| KEGG | C05643 |
| PubChem CID | 1864 |
| UNII | TV437T5077 |
| CompTox Dashboard (EPA) | DTXSID00176577 |
- InChI: InChI=1S/C13H16N2O3/c1-8(16)14-4-3-9-7-15-11-6-12(17)13(18-2)5-10(9)11/h5-7,15,17H,3-4H2,1-2H3,(H,14,16) Key: OMYMRCXOJJZYKE-UHFFFAOYSA-N; InChI=1/C13H16N2O3/c1-8(16)14-4-3-9-7-15-11-6-12(17)13(18-2)5-10(9)11/h5-7,15,17H,3-4H2,1-2H3,(H,14,16) Key: OMYMRCXOJJZYKE-UHFFFAOYAK
- SMILES: CC(=O)NCCC1=CNC2=CC(=C(C=C21)OC)O

Properties
| Chemical formula | C_{13}H_{16}N_{2}O_{3} |
| Molar mass | 248.282 g·mol^{−1} |
- Except where otherwise noted, data are given for materials in their standard state (at 25 °C [77 °F], 100 kPa). Infobox references

6-Hydroxymelatonin (6-OHM) is a naturally occurring, endogenous, major active metabolite of melatonin. 6-Hydroxymelatonin is produced as a result of the enzymatic conversion of melatonin through hydroxylation. Similar to melatonin, 6-OHM is a full agonist of the MT_{1} and MT_{2} receptors. It is also an antioxidant and neuroprotective, and is even more potent in this regard relative to melatonin.

== Role in metabolism ==
The determination of 6-OHM in human urine has been used to track the metabolism and excretion of melatonin using LC-MS/MS, providing quantifiable insights into circadian rhythm regulation and its oxidative role as a biomarker. 6-OHM is one of four of the primary metabolic products of melatonin in the liver and is also a byproduct of its breakdown due to exposure to light. It is known to be very effective in protecting cells from oxidative damage caused by ultraviolet (UV) radiation. Based on comparisons with other melatonin-related compounds, it is suggested that the protective effects of 6-OHM in mitigating oxidative stress are primarily attributed to their ability to scavenge free radicals.

== See also ==
- N-Acetylserotonin (normelatonin)
- 5-Methoxytryptamine
- Melatonin
