= Norepinephrine–dopamine disinhibitor =

Antidepressant

Chemical structure of agomelatine (Valdoxan), the prototypical NDDI.

A norepinephrine and dopamine disinhibitor (NDDI or NDD) is a drug that acts at specific sites to disinhibit downstream norepinephrine and dopamine release in the brain.

Agomelatine, an antidepressant which disinhibits norepinephrine and dopamine release in the frontal cortex by antagonizing 5-HT_{2C} receptors, was the first drug to be described as an NDDI. While many other drugs also antagonize 5-HT_{2C} receptors to some degree or another, they tend to be very non-specific in their actions, and as a result, the term "NDDI" has generally, though not always (for instance, fluoxetine has been called an NDDI in addition to SSRI due to its (weak) blockade of 5-HT_{2C}), been reserved for describing newer, more selective agents in which disinhibition of norepinephrine and dopamine release is their primary mechanism of action.

Another drug that has been referred to as an NDDI in the medical literature is flibanserin, which is approved as a treatment for hypoactive sexual desire disorder in premenopausal women. Flibanserin disinhibits norepinephrine and dopamine release in the prefrontal cortex by activating postsynaptic 5-HT_{1A} receptors in this area.

Aside from agomelatine, fluoxetine, flibanserin, mianserin and mirtazapine, as of present, no other drugs have been described as NDDIs in the medical literature, despite the fact that many other existing drugs possess effects consistent with those of the definition of an NDDI. In any case, more drugs labeled specifically as NDDIs may be seen in the future.

== See also ==
- Noradrenergic and specific serotonergic antidepressant (NaSSA)
- Serotonin antagonist and reuptake inhibitor (SARI)
- Serotonin modulator and stimulator (SMS)
