= Piromelatine =

Chemical compound

Identifiers
- IUPAC name: N-[2-(5-Methoxy-1H-indol-3-yl)ethyl]-4-oxopyran-2-carboxamide
- CAS Number: 946846-83-9
- PubChem CID: 24815904
- ChemSpider: 32700981
- UNII: S3UN2146K9
- ChEMBL: ChEMBL4297523
- CompTox Dashboard (EPA): DTXSID90241566

Chemical and physical data
- Formula: C_{17}H_{16}N_{2}O_{4}
- Molar mass: 312.325 g·mol^{−1}
- 3D model (JSmol): Interactive image
- SMILES: COC1=CC2=C(C=C1)NC=C2CCNC(=O)C3=CC(=O)C=CO3
- InChI: InChI=1S/C17H16N2O4/c1-22-13-2-3-15-14(9-13)11(10-19-15)4-6-18-17(21)16-8-12(20)5-7-23-16/h2-3,5,7-10,19H,4,6H2,1H3,(H,18,21); Key:PNTNBIHOAPJYDB-UHFFFAOYSA-N

Piromelatine (Neu-P11) is a multimodal sleep drug under development by Neurim Pharmaceuticals. It is an agonist at melatonin MT_{1}/MT_{2} and serotonin 5-HT_{1A}/5-HT_{1D} receptors. Neurim is conducting a phase II randomized, placebo controlled trial of cognitive and sleep effects in Alzheimer's disease.

Results of a phase II trial on insomnia in 120 adults were announced in 2013, finding piromelatine 20/50 mg improved sleep over 4 weeks vs placebo. Phase 1A/1B studies in 2011, showed safe dose-dependent improvement in sleep. Pre-clinical studies showed antinociceptive antihypertensive and cognitive benefits in rat disease models of pain, hypertension, and Alzheimer's disease.

Antidepressant and anti-anxiety effects were also demonstrated in animal models.

== See also ==
- List of investigational insomnia drugs
