= Chronobiotic =

Substance that alters the body clock

A chronobiotic is an agent that can cause phase adjustment of the circadian rhythm (biological body clock). That is, it is a substance capable of therapeutically entraining or re-entraining long-term desynchronized or short-term dissociated circadian rhythms in mammals, or prophylactically preventing their disruption following an environmental insult such as is caused by rapid travel across several time zones. The most widely recognized chronobiotic is the hormone melatonin, secreted at night in both diurnal and nocturnal species.

== History ==
The concept of chronobiotics arose from the research and characterization of the pineal gland. In 1917, Carey Pratt McCord and Floyd Pierpont Allen at Johns Hopkins University demonstrated that tadpoles hatched in water that contained crushed pineal gland were much lighter in color than tadpoles hatched in normal water. No one could explain this phenomenon, and pineal gland research halted until the 1950s. Mark Altschule and Julian Kitay, both physicians at Harvard, summarized the body of pineal gland literature in the 1950s. Their main conclusion was that pineal gland hormones affected the size of rats' gonads, although the hormones had not yet been identified.

Melatonin was originally discovered by Aaron Lerner, a Yale dermatologist, and colleagues, who had hoped it could be used to treat vitiligo. Although melatonin did not prove to be relevant to dermatology treatments, it was quickly confirmed to be secreted by the pineal gland to affect the brain. Further research found that circadian melatonin rhythms persisted under constant darkness, which suggested that light alone is not responsible for the cycle of melatonin secretion. Rather, endogenous melatonin serves to internalize light cues, making melatonin responsible for modulating neuroendocrine functions.

The suprachiasmatic nucleus, or SCN, is a small region within the anterior hypothalamus of the brain that is responsible for orienting the organism's internal measurement of time to external time cues like daylight. The SCN was first identified to be the "circadian pacemaker" responsible for generating circadian rhythms in 1972. Both Robert Moore at the University of Chicago and Irving Zucker at the University of California, Berkeley linked the SCN to circadian rhythmicity at the same time by lesioning regions of the brain and observing their effects on circadian rhythms. When the SCN region was lesioned in rodents, the rodents did not exhibit circadian rhythms, which established the SCN as the circadian pacemaker.

Robert Moore and David Klein first studied the SCN in the context of melatonin secretion by the pineal gland in 1974. Melatonin has been established as a reliable output of the SCN's timekeeping property, and melatonin research has been coupled with SCN research since 1974. Because melatonin is secreted according to signals to the pineal gland from the SCN, exogenous melatonin taken as a chronobiotic can affect feedback to the SCN and its subsequent circadian rhythms.

== Types ==
=== Quiadon ===
Quiadon (mepiprazole dihydrochloride) was one of the first chronobiotics used to affect circadian rhythms in humans. A 3-alkyl pyrazolyl piperazine, Quiadon is a serotonin-depleting tranquilizer. However, the original study performed by H.W. Simpson and colleagues in 1973 delivered inconclusive results, and Quiadon was never put on the market for human use.

=== Melatonin ===
Melatonin is a natural hormone produced by the body to encode nighttime. Endogenous melatonin is secreted daily in all mammals beginning after sunset and ending just before sunrise. Melatonin's chronobiotic property was initially suspected in the late 1980s when a high density of high-affinity melatonin receptors was discovered in the SCN. Little is known about the long-term effects of taking melatonin.

=== Chrononutrition ===
The field of chrononutrition was established after dietary tryptophan was shown to synchronize the circadian rhythm with environmental time cues in 1968. Melatonin, which is also known for its chronobiotic properties, is synthesized from tryptophan. It is not only the nutrient that is relevant to chrononutrition, but the timing of nutrient consumption. By strategically planning meal times, the body can become resynchronized with exogenous time.

== See also ==
- Circadian rhythm sleep disorder
- Chronobiology
- List of investigational chronobiotics
- Sleep medicine
