= Tasimelteon =

Wakefulness medication

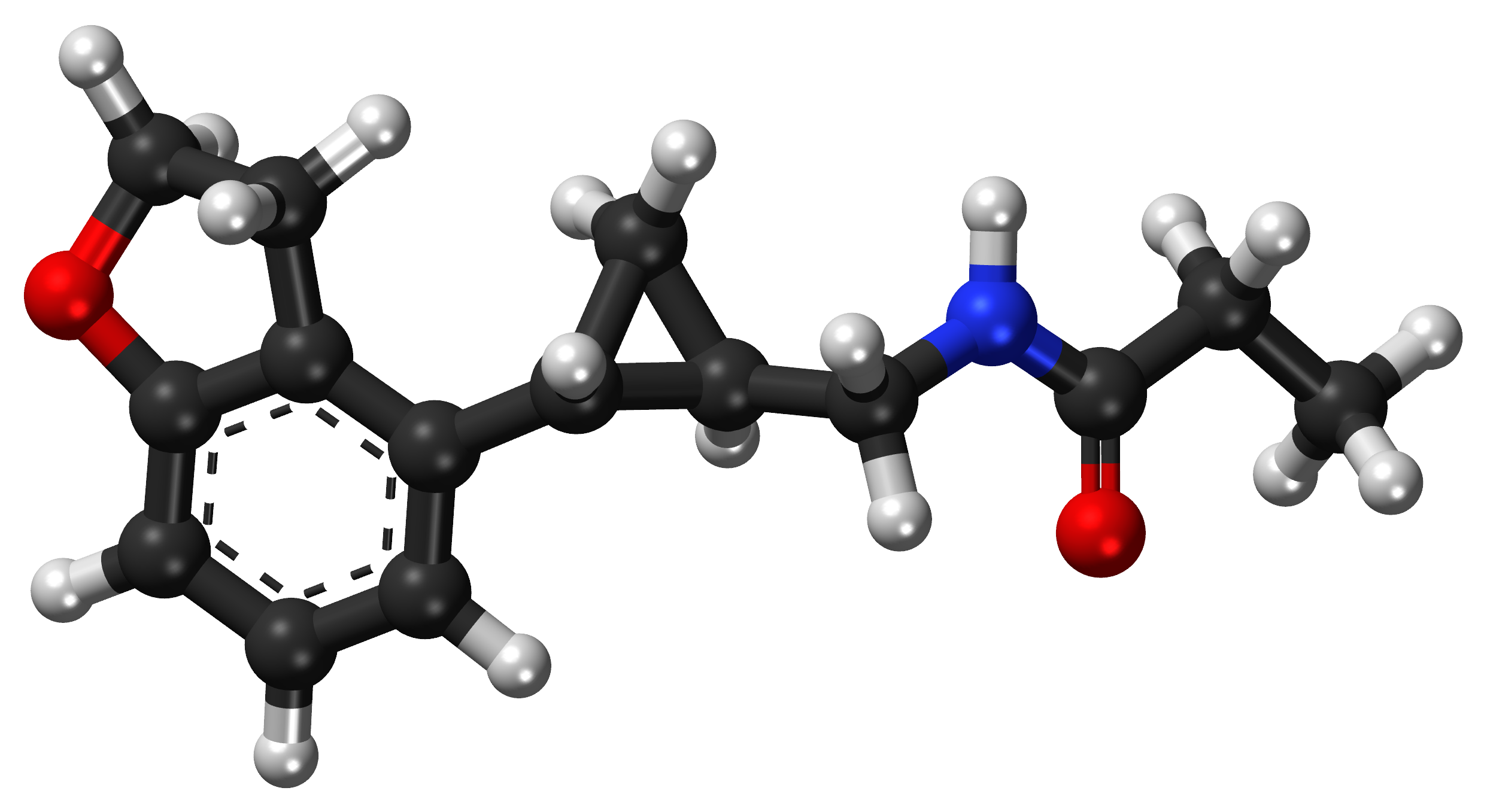

Clinical data
- Trade names: Hetlioz, Hetlioz LQ
- AHFS/Drugs.com: Monograph
- MedlinePlus: a615004
- License data: EU EMA: by INN; US DailyMed: Tasimelteon
- Dependence liability: Low
- Routes of administration: By mouth
- ATC code: N05CH03 (WHO)

Legal status
- Legal status: US: ℞-only; EU: Rx-only

Pharmacokinetic data
- Bioavailability: not determined in humans
- Protein binding: 89–90%
- Metabolism: extensive liver, primarily CYP1A2 and CYP3A4-mediated
- Elimination half-life: 0.9–1.7 h / 0.8–5.9 h (terminal)
- Excretion: 80% in urine, 4% in feces

Identifiers
- IUPAC name: (1R, 2R)-N-[2-(2,3-dihydrobenzofuran-4-yl)cyclopropylmethyl]propanamide
- CAS Number: 609799-22-6
- PubChem CID: 10220503
- IUPHAR/BPS: 7393
- DrugBank: DB09071
- ChemSpider: 8395995
- UNII: SHS4PU80D9
- ChEBI: CHEBI:79042
- CompTox Dashboard (EPA): DTXSID70209826
- ECHA InfoCard: 100.114.889

Chemical and physical data
- Formula: C_{15}H_{19}NO_{2}
- Molar mass: 245.322 g·mol^{−1}
- 3D model (JSmol): Interactive image
- SMILES: CCC(=O)NC[C@@H]1C[C@H]1c1cccc2c1CCO2
- InChI: InChI=1S/C15H19NO2/c1-2-15(17)16-9-10-8-13(10)11-4-3-5-14-12(11)6-7-18-14/h3-5,10,13H,2,6-9H2,1H3,(H,16,17)/t10-,13+/m0/s1; Key:PTOIAAWZLUQTIO-GXFFZTMASA-N

Tasimelteon, sold under the brand name Hetlioz, is a medication approved by the U.S. Food and Drug Administration (FDA) in January 2014, for the treatment of non-24-hour sleep–wake disorder (also called non-24, N24 and N24HSWD). In June 2014, the European Medicines Agency (EMA) accepted an EU filing application for tasimelteon and in July 2015, the drug was approved in the European Union for the treatment of non-24-hour sleep-wake rhythm disorder in totally blind adults, but not in the case of non-24 in sighted people.

The most common side effects include headache, somnolence, nausea (feeling sick) and dizziness.

== Medical uses ==
In the United States, tasimelteon capsules are indicated for the treatment of non-24-hour sleep–wake disorder (Non-24) in adults and for the treatment of nighttime sleep disturbances in Smith-Magenis Syndrome (SMS) in people sixteen years of age and older. Tasimelteon oral suspension is indicated for the treatment of nighttime sleep disturbances in SMS in children from 3 to 15 years of age.

In the European Union, tasimelteon capsules are indicated for the treatment of non-24-hour sleep–wake disorder (Non-24) in totally blind adults.

The capsule and liquid suspension forms of tasimelteon are not interchangeable.

Tasimelteon is a selective agonist for the melatonin receptors MT_{1} and MT_{2}, similar to other members of the melatonin receptor agonist class of which ramelteon (2005), melatonin (2007), and agomelatine (2009) were the first approved. As a treatment for N24HSWD, as with melatonin or other melatonin derivatives, the patient may experience improved sleep timing while taking the drug. Reversion to baseline sleep performance occurs within a month of discontinuation.

== Development ==
Tasimelteon (previously known as BMS-214,778) was developed for the treatment of insomnia and other sleep disorders. A phase II trial on circadian rhythm sleep disorders was concluded in March 2005. A phase III insomnia trial was conducted in 2006. A second phase III trial on insomnia, this time concerning primary insomnia, was completed in June 2008. In 2010, the FDA granted orphan drug status to tasimelteon, then regarded as an investigational medication, for use in totally blind adults with N24HSWD. (Through mechanisms such as easing the approval process and extending exclusivity periods, orphan drug status encourages development of drugs for rare conditions that otherwise might lack sufficient commercial incentive.)

On completion of Phase III trials, interpretations of the clinical trials by the research team concluded that the drug may have therapeutic potential for transient insomnia in circadian rhythm sleep disorders. A year-long (2011–2012) study at Harvard tested the use of tasimelteon in blind subjects with non-24-hour sleep-wake disorder. The drug has not been tested in children nor in any non-blind people.

== FDA approval ==
In May 2013, Vanda Pharmaceuticals submitted a New Drug Application to the Food and Drug Administration for tasimelteon for the treatment of non-24-hour sleep–wake disorder in totally blind people. It was approved by the FDA on January 31, 2014, under the brand name Hetlioz. In the opinion of Public Citizen, an advocacy group, the FDA erroneously allowed it to be labelled without stating that it is only approved for use by totally blind people. However, FDA updated its press release on Oct. 2, 2014 to clarify the approved use of Hetlioz, which includes both sighted and blind individuals. The update did not change the drug labeling (prescribing information).

In Dec 2020, tasimelteon is approved by FDA for the treatment of Smith-Magenis Syndrome.

== Toxicity ==
Experiments with rodents revealed fertility impairments, an increase in certain cancers, and serious adverse events during pregnancy at dosages in excess of what is considered the "human dose".

== See also ==
- Discovery and development of melatonin receptor agonists
