= CYP1A2 =

Enzyme in the human body

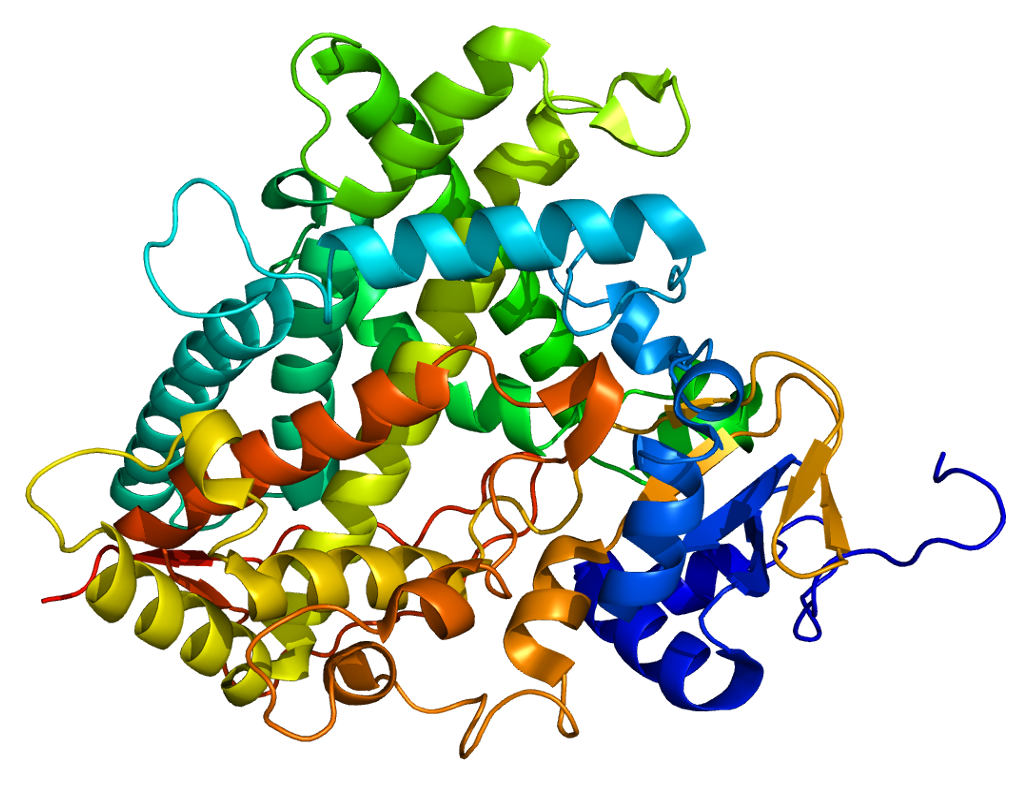

Identifiers
- Aliases: CYP1A2, CP12, P3-450, P450(PA), cytochrome P450 family 1 subfamily A member 2, Cytochrome P450 1A2, CYPIA2
- External IDs: OMIM: 124060; MGI: 88589; GeneCards: CYP1A2
Available structures
PDB	Ortholog search: PDBe RCSB
PDB	List of PDB id codes 2HI4
Enzyme activity
EC #	BRENDA	ExPASy	KEGG	MetaCyc
1.14.14.1	↗	↗	↗	↗
4.2.1.152	↗	↗	↗	↗

Gene location (Human)
Chr.	Chromosome 15 (human)
Band	15q24.1	Start	74,748,845 bp
Band	15q24.1	End	74,756,607 bp

Gene location (Mouse)
Chr.	Chromosome 9 (mouse)
Band	9 B|9 31.3 cM	Start	57,584,220 bp
Band	9 B|9 31.3 cM	End	57,590,986 bp
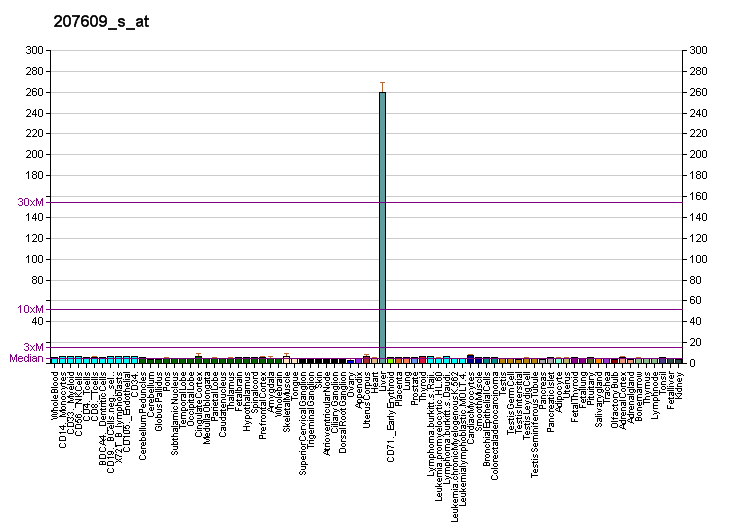

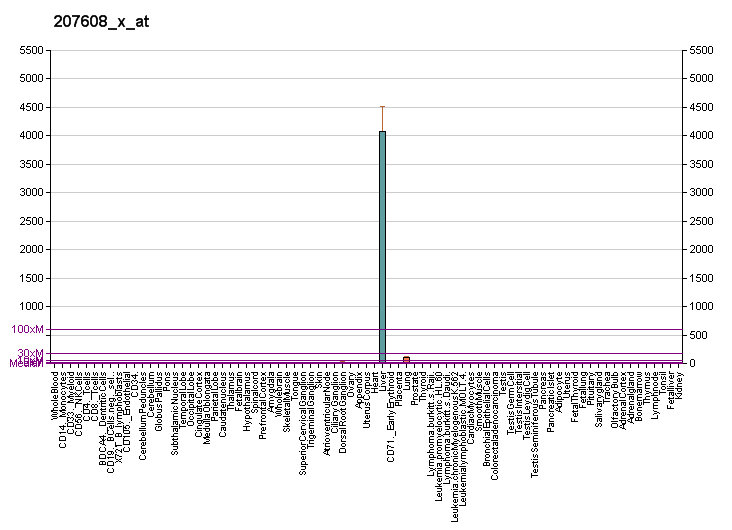
RNA expression pattern
Bgee	Human / Mouse (ortholog); Top expressed in: buccal mucosa cell; right lobe of liver; superficial temporal artery; cardia; nipple; vena cava; mucosa of paranasal sinus; subthalamic nucleus; sperm; ventral tegmental area / Top expressed in: left lobe of liver; olfactory epithelium; gallbladder; sexually immature organism; duodenum; thoracic diaphragm; medial head of gastrocnemius muscle; right lung lobe; thymus; pancreas; More reference expression data
BioGPS	More reference expression data
Gene ontology
Molecular function	iron ion binding; demethylase activity; oxidoreductase activity, acting on paired donors, with incorporation or reduction of molecular oxygen, reduced flavin or flavoprotein as one donor, and incorporation of one atom of oxygen; metal ion binding; caffeine oxidase activity; heme binding; oxidoreductase activity, acting on paired donors, with incorporation or reduction of molecular oxygen; enzyme binding; oxidoreductase activity; aromatase activity; electron transfer activity; monooxygenase activity
Cellular component	organelle membrane; endoplasmic reticulum membrane; intracellular membrane-bounded organelle; membrane; endoplasmic reticulum
Biological process	response to immobilization stress; toxin metabolic process; steroid metabolic process; response to estradiol; alkaloid metabolic process; response to organic cyclic compound; lung development; lipid metabolism; epoxygenase P450 pathway; cellular response to cadmium ion; post-embryonic development; monocarboxylic acid metabolic process; response to organic substance; oxidative demethylation; response to lipopolysaccharide; methylation; steroid catabolic process; omega-hydroxylase P450 pathway; dibenzo-p-dioxin metabolic process; heterocycle metabolic process; cellular respiration; cellular aromatic compound metabolic process; regulation of gene expression; hydrogen peroxide biosynthetic process; monoterpenoid metabolic process; xenobiotic metabolic process; porphyrin-containing compound metabolic process; toxin biosynthetic process; cellular response to copper ion; electron transport chain; long-chain fatty acid biosynthetic process
Sources:Amigo / QuickGO
Orthologs
Databases	NCBI: entry; OMA: entry
Species	Human	Mouse
Entrez	1544	13077
Ensembl	ENSG00000140505	ENSMUSG00000032310
UniProt	P05177	P00186
RefSeq (mRNA)	NM_000761	NM_009993
RefSeq (protein)	NP_000752	NP_034123
Location (UCSC)	Chr 15: 74.75 – 74.76 Mb	Chr 9: 57.58 – 57.59 Mb
PubMed search
- Wikidata
View/Edit Human	View/Edit Mouse

Cytochrome P450 1A2 (abbreviated CYP1A2), a member of the cytochrome P450 mixed-function oxidase system, is involved in the metabolism of xenobiotics in the human body. In humans, the CYP1A2 enzyme is encoded by the CYP1A2 gene.

== Function ==
CYP1A2 is a member of the cytochrome P450 superfamily of enzymes. The cytochrome P450 proteins are monooxygenases which catalyze many reactions involved in drug metabolism and synthesis of cholesterol, steroids and other lipids. CYP1A2 localizes to the endoplasmic reticulum and its expression is induced by some polycyclic aromatic hydrocarbons (PAHs), some of which are found in cigarette smoke. The enzyme's endogenous substrate is unknown; however, it is able to metabolize some PAHs to carcinogenic intermediates. Other xenobiotic substrates for this enzyme include caffeine, aflatoxin B1, and paracetamol (acetaminophen). The transcript from this gene contains four Alu sequences flanked by direct repeats in the 3' untranslated region.

CYP1A2 also metabolizes polyunsaturated fatty acids into signaling molecules that have physiological as well as pathological activities. It has monoxygenase activity for certain of these fatty acids in that it metabolizes arachidonic acid to 19-hydroxyeicosatetraenoic acid (19-HETE) (see 20-Hydroxyeicosatetraenoic acid) but also has epoxygenase activity in that it metabolizes docosahexaenoic acid to epoxides, primarily 19R,20S-epoxyeicosapentaenoic acid and 19S,20R-epoxyeicosapentaenoic acid isomers (termed 19,20-EDP) and similarly metabolizes eicosapentaenoic acid to epoxides, primarily 17R,18S-eicosatetraenoic acid and 17S,18R-eicosatetraenoic acid isomers (termed 17,18-EEQ).

19-HETE is an inhibitor of 20-HETE, a broadly active signaling molecule, e.g., it constricts arterioles, elevates blood pressure, promotes inflammation responses, and stimulates the growth of various types of tumor cells; however the in vivo ability and significance of 19-HETE in inhibiting 20-HETE has not been demonstrated. The EDP (epoxydocosapentaenoic acid) and EEQ (epoxyeicosatetraenoic acid) metabolites have a broad range of activities. In various animal models and in vitro studies on animal and human tissues, they decrease hypertension and pain perception; suppress inflammation; inhibit angiogenesis, endothelial cell migration and endothelial cell proliferation; and inhibit the growth and metastasis of human breast and prostate cancer cell lines. It is suggested that the EDP and EEQ metabolites function in humans as they do in animal models and that, as products of the omega-3 fatty acids, docosahexaenoic acid and eicosapentaenoic acid, the EDP and EEQ metabolites contribute to many of the beneficial effects attributed to dietary omega-3 fatty acids. EDP and EEQ metabolites are short-lived, being inactivated within seconds or minutes of formation by epoxide hydrolases, particularly soluble epoxide hydrolase, and therefore act locally.

CYP1A2 is not regarded as being a major contributor to forming the aforementioned epoxides but could act locally in certain tissues to do so.

The authoritative list of star allele nomenclature for CYP1A2 along with activity scores is kept by PharmVar.

== Effect of diet ==
Expression of CYP1A2 appears to be induced by various dietary constituents. Vegetables such as cabbages, cauliflower and broccoli are known to increase levels of CYP1A2. Lower activity of CYP1A2 in South Asians appears to be due to cooking these vegetables in curries using ingredients such as cumin and turmeric, ingredients known to inhibit the enzyme.

== Caffeine metabolism ==
CYP1A2 is involved in the metabolism of caffeine, and the presence of alleles that make this metabolization slow have been associated with an increased risk of nonfatal myocardial infarction for those who drink a lot of coffee (four or more cups per day).

== Ligands ==
Following is a table of selected substrates, inducers and inhibitors of CYP1A2.

Inhibitors of CYP1A2 can be classified by their potency, such as:

- Strong inhibitor being one that causes at least a 5-fold increase in the plasma AUC values of sensitive substrates metabolized through CYP1A2, or more than 80% decrease in clearance thereof.
- Moderate inhibitor being one that causes at least a 2-fold increase in the plasma AUC values of sensitive substrates metabolized through CYP1A2, or 50-80% decrease in clearance thereof.
- Weak inhibitor being one that causes at least a 1.25-fold but less than 2-fold increase in the plasma AUC values of sensitive substrates metabolized through CYP1A2, or 20-50% decrease in clearance thereof.

Substrates	Inhibitors	Inducers
dietary flavonoids; naringenin; naringin; quercetin; rutin; alosetron (5-HT_{3} antagonist); clopidogrel; many antidepressants; amitriptyline (tricyclic antidepressant); clomipramine (tricyclic antidepressant); imipramine (tricyclic antidepressant); agomelatine; duloxetine (SNRI, sensitive substrates of CYP1A2); some atypical antipsychotics; clozapine; olanzapine; haloperidol (typical antipsychotic); caffeine (xanthine, stimulant); ropivacaine (local anaesthetic); theophylline (xanthine, in respiratory diseases); zolmitriptan (serotonin receptor agonist); melatonin (antioxidant, sleep-inducer); tamoxifen (SERM); erlotinib (Tarceva, a tyrosine kinase inhibitor); cyclobenzaprine (muscle relaxant, depressant); estradiol (in hypoestrogenism); fluvoxamine (SSRI antidepressant); mexiletine (antiarrhythmic agent); naproxen (NSAID); ondansetron (5-HT_{3} antagonist); phenacetin (analgesic); paracetamol (analgesic, antipyretic); propranolol (beta blocker); ramelteon; riluzole (in amyotrophic lateral sclerosis); tacrine (parasympathomimetic); tasimelteon; tizanidine (α_{2} adrenergic agonist, antispasmodic); verapamil (calcium channel blocker, also classified as moderate sensitive substrate in CYP1A2); warfarin (anticoagulant); zileuton (in asthma)	Strong: Many fluoroquinolones (broad-spectrum antibiotics), including: enoxacin; ciprofloxacin; fluvoxamine (SSRI antidepressant); liquorice, most potently via the constituents: licochalcone A; glycycoumarin; Moderate: St. John's wort; methoxsalen (in psoriasis); mexiletine; oral contraceptives; Weak: acyclovir; allopurinol; mexiletine; cimetidine (H_{2}-receptor antagonist); caffeine; echinacea; peginterferon alpha-2a; theophylline; piperine; verapamil (a non-dihydropyridine calcium channel blocker) according to UpToDate. However, FASS, a Swedish national authority, attributes verapamil to strong CYP1A2 inhibitor.; zileuton; Unspecified potency: interferon (antiviral, antiseptic, antioncogenic); Mibefradil (calcium channel blocker); Some foods: grapefruit juice (its bitter flavanone naringenin); cumin; turmeric; isoniazid; tetrahydropalmatine; cannabidiol	Moderate inducers: combustion products (tobacco); phenytoin (antiepileptic); rifampin (antibiotic); ritonavir (antiretroviral); teriflunomide (used in treatment of MS); Unspecified potency: Some foods/herbs: brassica; broccoli; brussels sprouts; cauliflower; chargrilled meat; insulin (in diabetes); methylcholanthrene (carcinogen); modafinil (eugeroic); nafcillin (beta-lactam antibiotic); beta-naphthoflavone (chemopreventive); Some proton pump inhibitors: omeprazole; lansoprazole

== See also ==
- Drug metabolism
