= Agomelatine =

Atypical antidepressant classified primarily as a melatonin receptor agonist

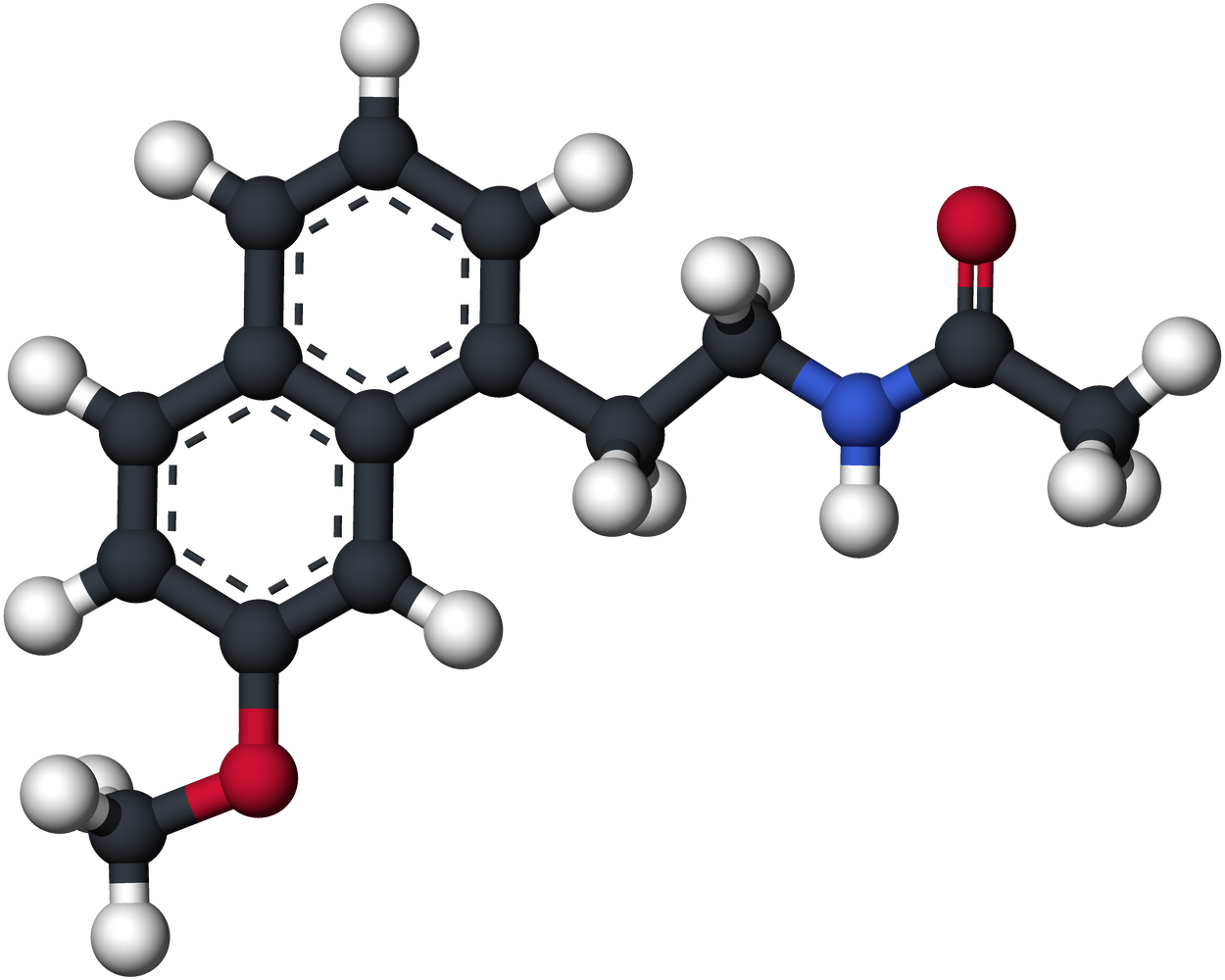

Clinical data
- Trade names: Thymanax, others
- Other names: AGO-178; AGO178C; S-20098; S-20098-F55; 7-Methoxy-N-acetyl-1-naphthylethylamine
- AHFS/Drugs.com: International Drug Names
- Pregnancy category: AU: B1
- Dependence liability: Low
- Routes of administration: By mouth
- Drug class: Atypical antidepressant; Anxiolytic; Norepinephrine-dopamine disinhibitor; 5-HT_{2C} receptor antagonist; Melatonin receptor agonist
- ATC code: N06AX22 (WHO)

Legal status
- Legal status: AU: S4 (Prescription only); BR: Class C1 (Other controlled substances); UK: POM (Prescription only); EU: Rx-only

Pharmacokinetic data
- Bioavailability: ~1%
- Protein binding: 95%
- Metabolism: Liver (90% CYP1A2 and 10% CYP2C9)
- Elimination half-life: 1–2 hours
- Excretion: Kidney (80%, mostly as metabolites)

Identifiers
- IUPAC name: N-[2-(7-methoxynaphthalen-1-yl)ethyl]acetamide
- CAS Number: 138112-76-2
- PubChem CID: 82148
- IUPHAR/BPS: 198
- DrugBank: DB06594
- ChemSpider: 74141
- UNII: 137R1N49AD
- KEGG: D02578
- ChEMBL: ChEMBL10878
- CompTox Dashboard (EPA): DTXSID3057642
- ECHA InfoCard: 100.157.896

Chemical and physical data
- Formula: C_{15}H_{17}NO_{2}
- Molar mass: 243.306 g·mol^{−1}
- 3D model (JSmol): Interactive image
- SMILES: O=C(NCCc1c2c(ccc1)ccc(OC)c2)C
- InChI: InChI=1S/C15H17NO2/c1-11(17)16-9-8-13-5-3-4-12-6-7-14(18-2)10-15(12)13/h3-7,10H,8-9H2,1-2H3,(H,16,17); Key:YJYPHIXNFHFHND-UHFFFAOYSA-N

Agomelatine, sold under the brand name Thymanax among others, is an atypical antidepressant most commonly used to treat major depressive disorder and generalized anxiety disorder. One review found that it is as effective as other antidepressants with similar discontinuation rates overall but fewer discontinuations due to side effects. Another review also found it was similarly effective to many other antidepressants.

Common side effects include headaches, nausea, and dizziness, which usually subside in the first few weeks, as well as liver problems – due to the potential effect on the liver, blood tests before treatment initiation, at specific time-points after initiation, and after dose increase is recommended. Its use is not recommended in people with dementia, or who are under the age of 18 or over 75. There is tentative evidence that it may have fewer side effects than some other antidepressants. It acts by blocking certain serotonin receptors and activating melatonin receptors.

Agomelatine was authorized for medical use in the European Union in 2009 and Australia in 2010. Its use in the United States is not approved. It was developed by the pharmaceutical company Servier.

== Medical uses ==
=== Major depressive disorder ===
Agomelatine is used for the treatment of major depressive episodes in adults in the European Union and Australia. Ten placebo controlled trials have been performed to investigate the short term efficacy of agomelatine in major depressive disorder. At the end of treatment, significant efficacy was demonstrated in six of the ten short-term double-blind placebo-controlled studies. Two were considered "failed" trials, as comparators of established efficacy failed to differentiate from placebo. Efficacy was also observed in more severely depressed patients in all positive placebo-controlled studies. The maintenance of antidepressant efficacy was demonstrated in a relapse prevention study. One meta-analysis found agomelatine to be as effective as standard antidepressants, with an effect size (SMD) of 0.24.

In 2018, a systematic review and network meta-analysis comparing the efficacy and acceptability of 21 antidepressant drugs found agomelatine to be comparable in efficacy to most other antidepressants and one of only two medications associated with fewer discontinuations for all causes than placebo.

A meta-analysis found that agomelatine is effective in treating severe depression. Its antidepressant effect is greater for more severe depression. In people with a greater baseline score (>30 on HAMD17 scale), the agomelatine-placebo difference was of 4.53 points. Controlled studies in humans have shown that agomelatine is at least as effective as the SSRI antidepressants paroxetine, sertraline, escitalopram, and fluoxetine in the treatment of major depression.

However, the body of research on agomelatine has been substantially affected by publication bias, prompting analyses which take into account both published and unpublished studies. These have confirmed that agomelatine is approximately as effective as more commonly used antidepressants (e.g. SSRIs), but some qualified this as "marginally clinically relevant", being only slightly above placebo. According to a 2013 review, agomelatine did not seem to provide an advantage in efficacy over other antidepressants for the acute-phase treatment of major depression.

=== Generalized anxiety disorder ===
Agomelatine is also approved for the treatment of generalized anxiety disorder in adults in Australia. It has been found more effective than placebo in the treatment of in a number of short-term double-blind placebo-controlled studies and in long term relapse prevention.

Use of agomelatine in general anxiety disorder is off-label in Europe. Agomelatine has been evaluated in a number of other off-label indications besides general anxiety disorder.

=== Use in special populations ===
It is not recommended in the European Union or Australia for use in children and adolescents below 18 years of age due to a lack of data on safety and efficacy. However, a recent 12 week study first reported in September 2020, and published in 2022 showed greater efficacy vs. placebo for agomelatine 25 mg per day in youth age 7–17 years and an acceptable tolerability profile with similar efficacy to fluoxetine. Only limited data is available on use in elderly people ≥ 75 years old with major depressive episodes.

It is not recommended during pregnancy or breastfeeding.

== Contraindications ==
Agomelatine is contraindicated in patients with kidney or liver impairment. According to information disclosed by Servier in 2012, guidelines for the follow-up of patients treated with Valdoxan have been modified in concert with the European Medicines Agency. As some patients may experience increased levels of liver enzymes in their blood during treatment with Valdoxan, doctors have to run laboratory tests to check that the liver is working properly at the initiation of the treatment and then periodically during treatment, and subsequently decide whether to pursue the treatment or not. No relevant modification in agomelatine pharmacokinetic parameters in patients with severe renal impairment has been observed. However, only limited clinical data on its use in depressed patients with severe or moderate renal impairment with major depressive episodes is available. Therefore, caution should be exercised when prescribing agomelatine to these patients.

== Adverse effects ==
Common (1–10% incidence) adverse effects include

- Headache
- Nausea
- Dizziness
- Somnolence
- Diarrhea
- Insomnia
- Fatigue
- Back pain
- Abdominal pain
- Anxiety
- Increased ALAT and ASAT (liver enzymes), possibly greater than three times the upper limit of normal
- Hyperhidrosis (excess sweating that is not proportionate to the ambient temperature)
- Constipation
- Vomiting
- Migraine

Uncommon (0.1–1%) adverse effects include

- Paraesthesia (abnormal sensations [e.g. itching, burning, tingling, etc.] due to malfunctioning of the peripheral nerves)
- Blurred vision
- Eczema
- Pruritus (itching)
- Urticaria
- Agitation
- Irritability
- Restlessness
- Aggression
- Nightmares
- Abnormal dreams

Rare (0.01–0.1%) adverse effects include

- Mania
- Hypomania
- Suicidal ideation
- Suicidal behaviour
- Hallucinations
- Steatohepatitis
- Increased GGT and/or alkaline phosphatase
- Liver failure
- Jaundice
- Erythematous rash
- Face oedema and angioedema
- Weight gain or loss, which tends to be less significant than with SSRIs

Excepting effects on the liver, the above adverse effects were usually mild to moderate and occurred in the first two weeks of treatment, subsiding thereafter.

36.1% of patients with elevated enzyme levels normalize on their own without discontinuing agomelatine. For those who choose to discontinue the drug, the median time to liver enzyme level recovery is 14 days. A 2019 study found no difference in rates of acute liver injury between users of citalopram and agomelatine, though this rate could be decreased due to the precautionary liver enzyme monitoring in the European Union. The EU recommends checking liver enzyme levels before treatment initiation, and then after 3, 6, 12, and 24 weeks and following a dose increase.

Agomelatine does not alter daytime vigilance and memory in healthy volunteers. Agomelatine appears to cause fewer sexual side effects and discontinuation effects than paroxetine.

=== Dependence and withdrawal ===
No dosage tapering is needed on treatment discontinuation. Agomelatine has no abuse potential as measured in healthy volunteer studies.

== Overdose ==
Agomelatine is expected to be relatively safe in overdose.

== Interactions ==
Agomelatine is a substrate of CYP1A2, CYP2C9 and CYP2C19. Inhibitors of these enzymes, e.g. the SSRI antidepressant fluvoxamine, reduce its clearance and can lead to an increase in agomelatine exposure, and possibly serotonin syndrome. There is also the potential for agomelatine to interact with alcohol to increase the risk of hepatotoxicity.

== Pharmacology ==
=== Pharmacodynamics ===
Agomelatine acts as a highly potent and selective melatonin MT_{1} and MT_{2} receptor agonist (K_{i} = 0.1 nM and 0.12 nM, respectively) and also as a relatively weak serotonin 5-HT_{2B} and 5-HT_{2C} receptor antagonist (K_{i} = 660 nM and 631 nM, respectively; ~6,000-fold lower than for the melatonin receptors). It is a silent antagonist rather than an inverse agonist of the serotonin 5-HT_{2C} receptor. The drug has negligible affinity for the serotonin 5-HT_{2A} receptor or for a variety of other targets.

By antagonizing the serotonin 5-HT_{2C} receptor, agomelatine has been found to disinhibit and increase norepinephrine and dopamine release in the frontal cortex in animals, although notably not in the striatum or nucleus accumbens. In contrast to agomelatine, other serotonin 5-HT_{2C} receptor antagonists and inverse agonists, such as SB-242084 and SB-206553, have been found to increase dopamine and norepinephrine levels in the nucleus accumbens. These differences may in part be related to constitutive activity of the serotonin 5-HT_{2C} receptor and resulting differences between neutral antagonists and inverse agonists of the receptor. In addition, there are multiple isoforms of the serotonin 5-HT_{2C} receptor with different properties. In other studies, while agomelatine alone did not affect the firing rates of ventral tegmental area (VTA) dopaminergic neurons, it abolished the inhibition of these neurons by the serotonin 5-HT_{2C} receptor agonist Ro60-0175. Due to the increase in norepinephrine and dopamine levels in the frontal cortex with agomelatine, the drug has sometimes been referred to as a norepinephrine–dopamine disinhibitor (NDDI).

Although agomelatine is widely claimed to act as a serotonin 5-HT_{2C} receptor antagonist, the clinical significance of this action has been disputed. Unlike with other serotonin 5-HT_{2C} receptor antagonists, therapeutic doses of agomelatine fail to acutely increase slow-wave sleep in humans. Additionally, no receptor occupancy studies of agomelatine have been conducted in humans to demonstrate significant occupancy of serotonin 5-HT_{2C} receptors at therapeutic doses.

Agomelatine has shown an antidepressant-like effect in animal models of depression (learned helplessness test, behavioral despair test, chronic mild stress) as well as in models with circadian rhythm desynchronisation and in models related to stress and anxiety. Agomelatine has been found to resynchronize circadian rhythms in animal models of delayed sleep phase syndrome (DSPS). In humans, agomelatine has positive phase-shifting properties; it induces a phase advance of sleep, body temperature decline, and melatonin onset.

In depressed patients, treatment with the drug increases slow-wave sleep without modification of REM (rapid eye movement) sleep amount or REM latency. From the first week of treatment, onset of sleep and the quality of sleep significantly improved without daytime clumsiness as assessed by patients.

=== Pharmacokinetics ===
The main route of metabolism for agomelatine is hepatic through the CYP1A2 (90%) and CYP2C9/19 (10%); co-administration of strong CYP1A2 inhibitors (e.g., fluvoxamine) is contraindicated. Agomelatine is well-absorbed with oral administration (≥80%), but it has very low oral bioavailability (~1%) due to extensive first-pass metabolism. The elimination half-life of agomelatine is 1 to 2 hours. The half-life of agomelatine does not change with repeated administration. There is no accumulation of agomelatine with continuous administration.

== Chemistry ==
=== Structure ===
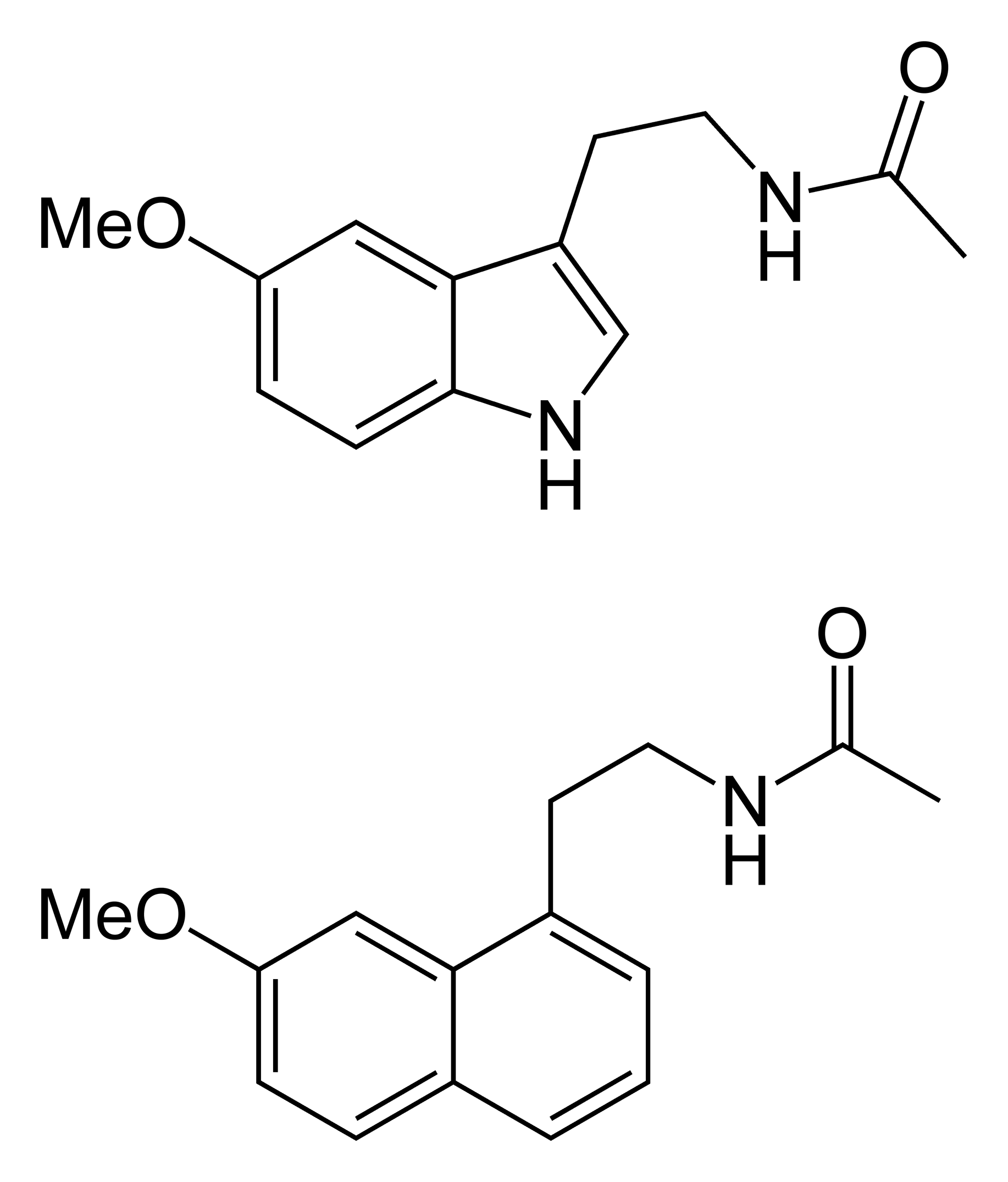
melatonin (top) vs. agomelatine (bottom).

The chemical structure of agomelatine is very similar to that of melatonin. Where melatonin has an indole ring system, agomelatine has a naphthalene bioisostere instead.

=== Synthesis ===
Agomelatine-synthesis: and structure-activity studies:

== History ==
Agomelatine was discovered and developed by the European pharmaceutical company Servier Laboratories Ltd. Servier continued to develop the drug and conduct phase III trials in the European Union.

In March 2005, Servier submitted agomelatine to the European Medicines Agency (EMA) under the brand names Valdoxan and Thymanax. In July 2006, the Committee for Medicinal Products for Human Use of the EMA recommended a refusal of the marketing authorisation. The major concern was that efficacy had not been sufficiently shown, while there were no special concerns about side effects. In September 2007, Servier submitted a new marketing application to the EMA.

In March 2006, Servier announced it had sold the rights to market agomelatine in the United States to Novartis. It was undergoing several phase III clinical trials in the US, and until October 2011 Novartis listed the drug as scheduled for submission to the FDA no earlier than 2012. However, the development for the US market was discontinued in October 2011, when the results from the last of those trials became available.

It was authorized for medical use in the European Union in February 2009, and in Australia in August 2010.

== Research ==
=== Circadian rhythm sleep disorders ===
Agomelatine has been investigated for its effects on sleep regulation due its actions as a melatonin receptor agonist. Studies report various improvements in general quality of sleep metrics, as well as benefits in circadian rhythm sleep disorders. However, research is very limited (e.g., case reports) and agomelatine is not approved for use in the treatment of sleep disorders.

=== Seasonal affective disorder ===
A 2019 Cochrane review suggested no recommendations of agomelatine in support of, or against, its use to treat individuals with seasonal affective disorder.
