= Scientific study =

Use of science to increase knowledge

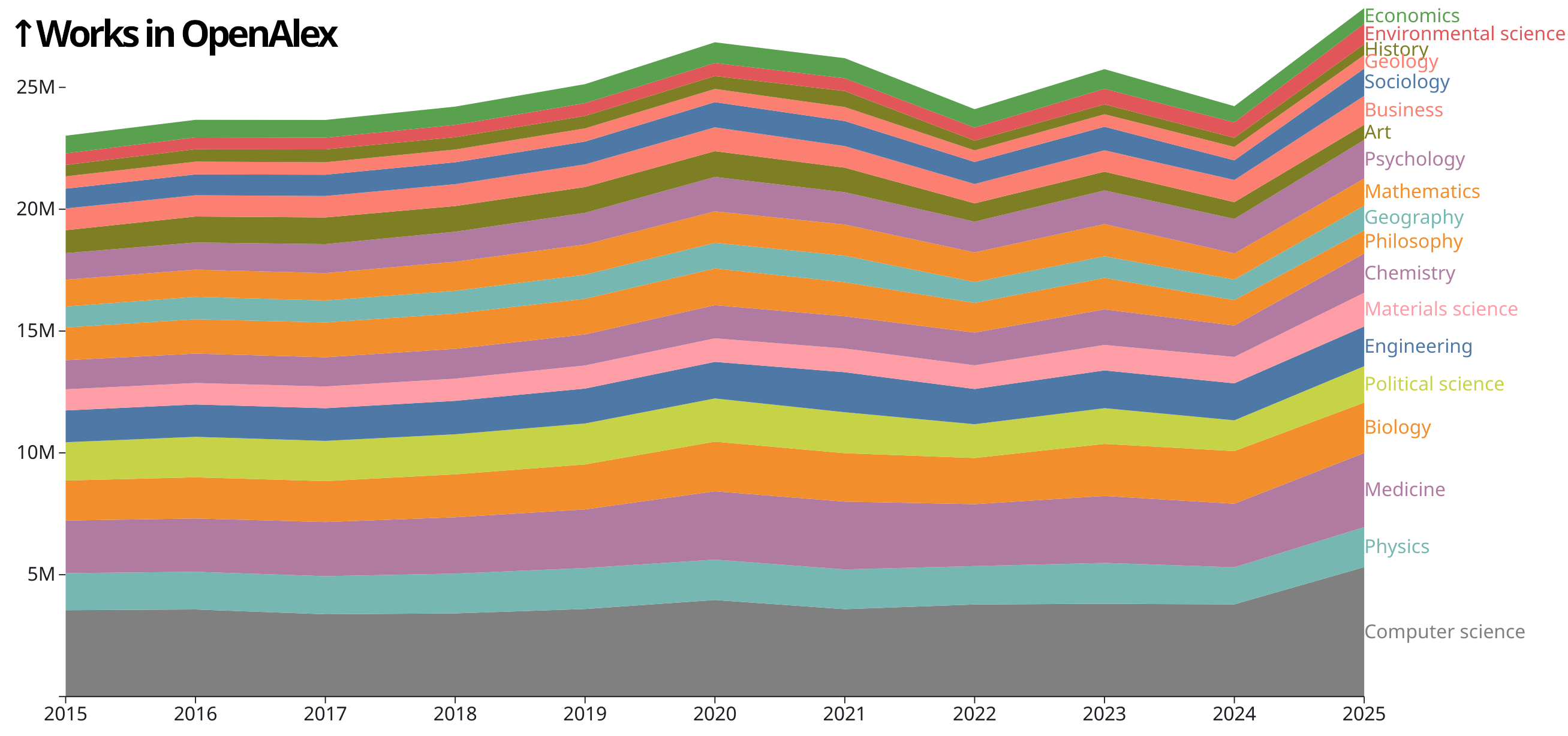
Scientific papers by field

Scientific study is a creative action to increase knowledge and science by systematically collecting, interpreting, and evaluating data. According to the hypothetico-deductive paradigm, it should encompass:

- The contextualization of the problem;
- A hypothesis for explaining the problem considering existing theoretical approaches;
- A verification of the hypotheses by an experiment;
- Analysis of the test outcome.

Scientific study involves scientific theory, scientific method, scientific models, experiments and physical situations. It may refer to:

- Scientific method, a body of techniques for investigating phenomena, based on empirical or measurable evidence that is subject to the principles of logic and reasoning
- Observational study, draws inferences about the possible effect of a treatment on subjects, where the assignment of subjects into a treated group versus a control group is outside the control of the investigator
- Randomized controlled trial, a type of scientific experiment, often in the medical field, where the people being studied are randomly allocated one of the different treatments
- Science, a systematic enterprise that builds and organizes knowledge in the form of testable explanations and predictions about the universe.

Scientific learning includes testing of theories and provide a basis for scientific knowledge.

== History ==
Aristotle is believed to be the first to begin the study of any subject from the contextualization of the issue, i.e., by collecting, analyzing, and grouping all relevant facts. By determining their meaning and relations with each other, he developed a systematic and factually correct basis that allowed him to generalize about underlying rules or principles. Aristotle introduced two modes of generalizing by highlighting two directions – deductive and inductive – within inquiry methods: one guides from observed specific instance to the general principles; the other controversially, from the fundamental to instances or implications of principles. The notion of syllogism, a means of deductive reasoning as proceeding from previously established general rules or facts down to particular instances, was introduced by Aristotle. His treatise is recognized as one of the earliest systematic study on the nature of scientific inquiry.

Francis Bacon developed the notion of the scientific study by proposing methodical collection of observations. This idea of a gradual ascent to reliable general claims, even though it seems obvious now, was innovative in that era and contributed to changing an approach to research design.

Galileo Galilei contributed to modern approaches to collecting, interpreting, and evaluating data by stating that the laws of nature are mathematical and proposing the standards of length and time in conducting experiments. Galileo originated grounds for a method of scientific study, the so-called hypothetico-deductive method, generally used in modern scientific research.

== See also ==
- Experiment
- Scientific modelling
- Scientific theory
- Reality
