= Melatonin receptor 1A =

Protein found in humans

MTNR1A

Identifiers
- Aliases: MTNR1A, MEL-1A-R, MT1, Melatonin receptor 1A
- External IDs: OMIM: 600665; MGI: 102967; GeneCards: MTNR1A

Gene location (Human)
Chr.	Chromosome 4 (human)
Band	4q35.2	Start	186,533,655 bp
Band	4q35.2	End	186,555,567 bp

Gene location (Mouse)
Chr.	Chromosome 8 (mouse)
Band	8 B1.1|8 24.95 cM	Start	45,522,174 bp
Band	8 B1.1|8 24.95 cM	End	45,541,543 bp
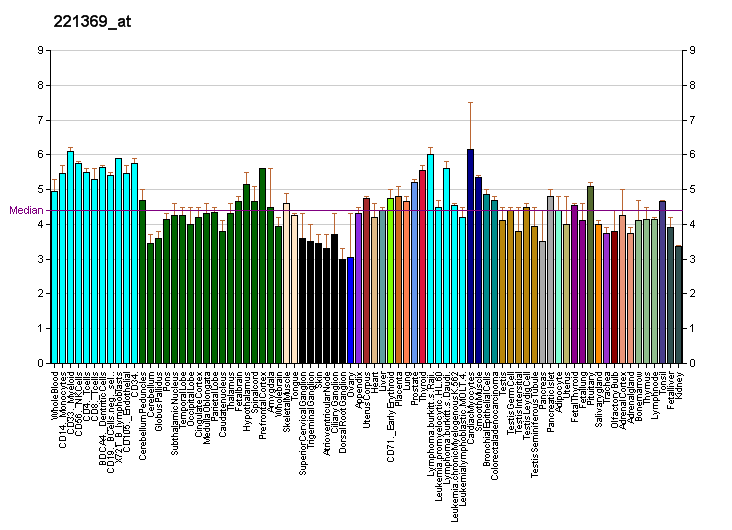
RNA expression pattern
Bgee	Human / Mouse (ortholog); Top expressed in: testicle; palpebral conjunctiva; rectum; islet of Langerhans; human kidney; appendix; gallbladder; cerebellar cortex; cerebellar hemisphere; mucosa of transverse colon / Top expressed in: lens; embryo; embryo; epithelium of lens; suprachiasmatic nucleus; spermatid; superior cervical ganglion; liver; left lobe of liver; duodenum; More reference expression data
BioGPS	More reference expression data
Gene ontology
Molecular function	hormone binding; G protein-coupled receptor activity; organic cyclic compound binding; signal transducer activity; protein binding; melatonin receptor activity
Cellular component	integral component of membrane; membrane; receptor complex; integral component of plasma membrane; plasma membrane
Biological process	G protein-coupled receptor signaling pathway, coupled to cyclic nucleotide second messenger; mating behavior; signal transduction; circadian rhythm; G protein-coupled receptor signaling pathway; adenylate cyclase-inhibiting G protein-coupled receptor signaling pathway
Sources:Amigo / QuickGO
Orthologs
Databases	NCBI: entry; OMA: entry
Species	Human	Mouse
Entrez	4543	17773
Ensembl	ENSG00000168412	ENSMUSG00000054764
UniProt	P48039	Q61184
RefSeq (mRNA)	NM_005958	NM_008639
RefSeq (protein)	NP_005949	NP_032665
Location (UCSC)	Chr 4: 186.53 – 186.56 Mb	Chr 8: 45.52 – 45.54 Mb
PubMed search
- Wikidata
View/Edit Human	View/Edit Mouse

Melatonin receptor type 1A is a protein that in humans is encoded by the MTNR1A gene.

== Function ==
This gene encodes the MT_{1} protein, one of two high-affinity forms of a receptor for melatonin, the primary hormone secreted by the pineal gland. This receptor is a rhodopsin-like receptor (a G protein-coupled, 7-transmembrane receptor) that is responsible for melatonin effects on mammalian circadian rhythm and reproductive alterations affected by day length. The receptor is an integral membrane protein that is readily detectable and localized to two specific regions of the brain. The hypothalamic suprachiasmatic nucleus appears to be involved in circadian rhythm while the hypophysial pars tuberalis may be responsible for the reproductive effects of melatonin.

== Ligands ==
1. Melatonin – full agonist
2. Afobazole – agonist
3. Agomelatine – agonist

== See also ==
- Melatonin receptor
- Discovery and development of melatonin receptor agonists
