= Melatonin receptor 1B =

Protein found in humans

MTNR1B

Identifiers
- Aliases: MTNR1B, FGQTL2, MEL-1B-R, MT2, Melatonin receptor 1B
- External IDs: OMIM: 600804; MGI: 2181726; GeneCards: MTNR1B

Gene location (Human)
Chr.	Chromosome 11 (human)
Band	11q14.3	Start	92,969,651 bp
Band	11q14.3	End	92,985,066 bp

Gene location (Mouse)
Chr.	Chromosome 9 (mouse)
Band	9|9 A2	Start	15,735,824 bp
Band	9|9 A2	End	15,785,852 bp
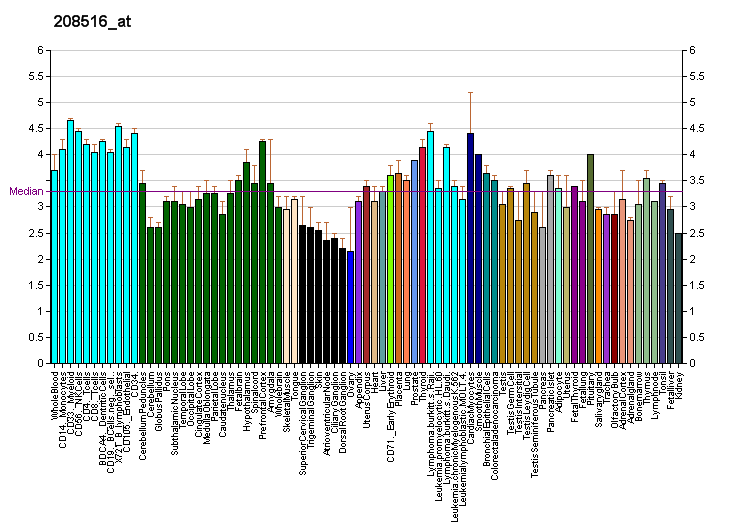
RNA expression pattern
Bgee	Human / Mouse (ortholog); Top expressed in: gonad; islet of Langerhans; nucleus accumbens; placenta; caudate nucleus; renal cortex; endometrium; left testis; right testis; hypothalamus / Top expressed in: lip; More reference expression data
BioGPS	More reference expression data
Gene ontology
Molecular function	signal transducer activity; melatonin receptor activity; protein binding; G protein-coupled receptor activity
Cellular component	integral component of membrane; membrane; integral component of plasma membrane; plasma membrane
Biological process	glucose homeostasis; regulation of insulin secretion; G protein-coupled receptor signaling pathway, coupled to cyclic nucleotide second messenger; circadian rhythm; signal transduction; chemical synaptic transmission; G protein-coupled receptor signaling pathway; negative regulation of cGMP-mediated signaling; positive regulation of circadian rhythm; camera-type eye development; negative regulation of neuron apoptotic process; positive regulation of circadian sleep/wake cycle, non-REM sleep; negative regulation of insulin secretion; negative regulation of cytosolic calcium ion concentration; negative regulation of transmission of nerve impulse; positive regulation of transmission of nerve impulse; regulation of neuronal action potential; negative regulation of delayed rectifier potassium channel activity
Sources:Amigo / QuickGO
Orthologs
Databases	NCBI: entry; OMA: entry
Species	Human	Mouse
Entrez	4544	244701
Ensembl	ENSG00000134640	ENSMUSG00000050901
UniProt	P49286	Q8CIQ6; Q3SXF8
RefSeq (mRNA)	NM_005959	NM_145712
RefSeq (protein)	NP_005950	NP_663758
Location (UCSC)	Chr 11: 92.97 – 92.99 Mb	Chr 9: 15.74 – 15.79 Mb
PubMed search
- Wikidata
View/Edit Human	View/Edit Mouse

Melatonin receptor 1B, also known as MTNR1B, is a protein that in humans is encoded by the MTNR1B gene.

== Function ==
This gene encodes the MT_{2} protein, one of two high-affinity forms of a receptor for melatonin, the primary hormone secreted by the pineal gland. This gene product is an integral membrane protein that is a G-protein coupled, 7-transmembrane receptor. It is found primarily in the retina and brain; however, this detection requires RT-PCR. It is thought to participate in light-dependent functions in the retina and may be involved in the neurobiological effects of melatonin. Besides the brain and retina this receptor is expressed on the bone forming cells where it regulates their function in depositing bone.

== Clinical significance ==
Several studies have identified MTNR1B receptor mutations that are associated with increased average blood sugar level and around a 20 percent elevated risk of developing type 2 diabetes. MTNR1B mRNA is expressed in human islets, and immunocytochemistry confirms that it is primarily localized in beta cells in islets.

== Ligands ==
The following MT2R ligands have selectivity over MT1R:

- Compound 3d: antagonist with sub-nM affinity
- Compound 18f: antagonist and compound 18g partial agonist: sub-nM affinity, >100-fold selectivity over MT1
- Compound 14: antagonist
- Compound 13: agonist

== See also ==
- Melatonin receptor
- Discovery and development of melatonin receptor agonists
