= Pinealoma =

Tumor of the pineal gland

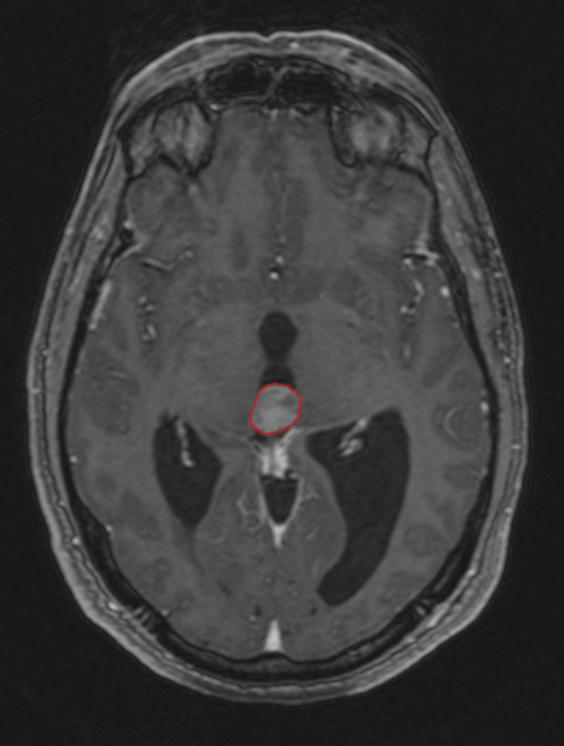
- Pineocytoma
- Specialty: Oncology
- Treatment: Surgical resection, radiation therapy

A pinealoma is a tumor of the pineal gland, a part of the brain that produces melatonin. If a pinealoma destroys the cells of the pineal gland in a child, it can cause precocious puberty.

== Signs and symptoms ==
The pineal gland produces the hormone melatonin which plays a role in regulating circadian rhythms. A pinealoma may disrupt production of this hormone, and insomnia may result.

Frequently, paralysis of upward gaze along with several ocular findings such as convergence retraction nystagmus and eyelid retraction also known as Collier's sign and Light Near Dissociation (pupil accommodates but doesn't react to light) are known collectively as Parinaud's syndrome or Dorsal Mid-brain syndrome, are the only physical symptoms seen. This is caused by the compression of the vertical gaze center in the midbrain tectum at the level of the superior colliculus and cranial nerve III. Work-up usually includes Neuro-imaging as seen on the right.

A pinealoma may cause interruption of hypothalamic inhibiting pathways, sometimes leading to beta-hCG secretion and consequent Leydig's cell stimulation (endocrine syndrome).

Other symptoms may include hydrocephalus, gait disturbances, and precocious puberty.

== Cause ==
Pinealomas can be due to proliferation of primary pineocytes (pineocytomas, pineoblastomas), astrocytes (astrocytoma), or germ cells (germinoma). Germinomas are the most common tumor in the pineal gland.

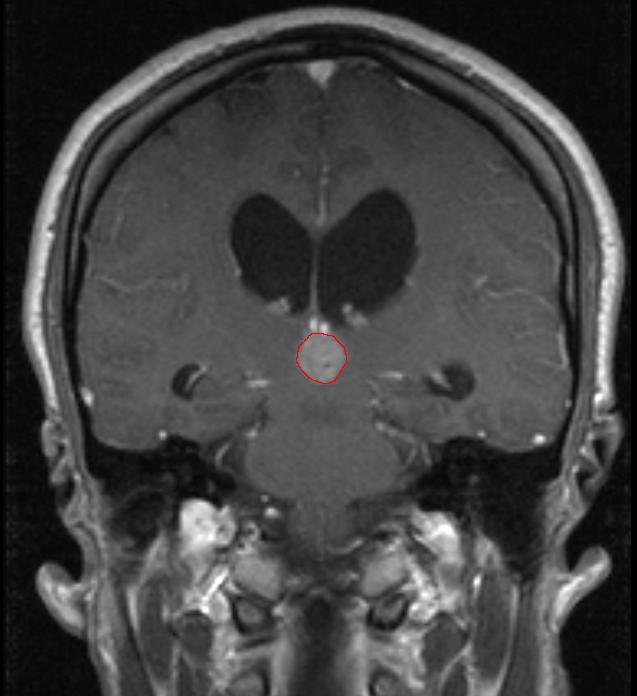

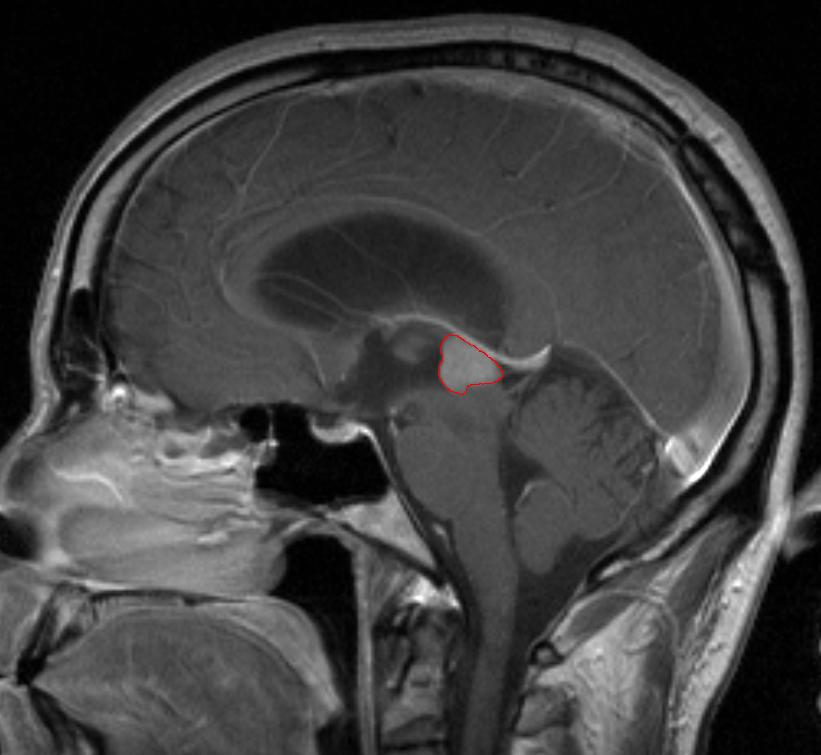

== Treatment ==
Some pinealomas are treated by radiotherapy, since surgical removal may be impossible due to the location. Radiotherapy can be successful in killing the tumour, and 50% of patients undergoing it survive to old age.

== Prognosis ==
Of the different types of pinealomas, the type with the most favorable prognosis is the pineocytoma.
