= Pinealectomy =

Surgical removal of the pineal gland

- Specialty: Endocrinology

Pinealectomy is a surgical procedure in which the pineal gland is removed. It is performed only in rare cases, where a pineocytoma or a pineal gland cyst has become life-threatening.

== See also ==
- Hypophysectomy
- Thyroidectomy
- Adrenalectomy
- List of surgeries by type
