= Hydroxyapatite =

Naturally occurring mineral form of calcium apatite

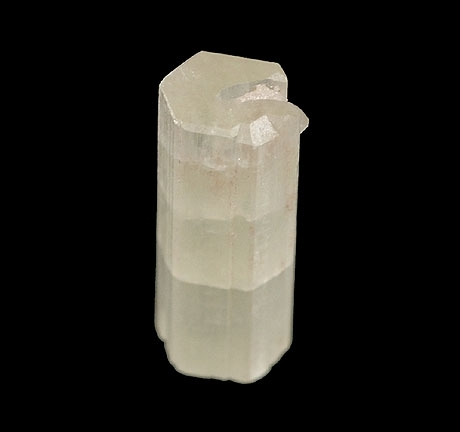
- Hydroxyapatite crystal

General
- Category: Phosphate mineral Apatite group
- Formula: Ca_{5}(PO_{4})_{3}OH
- IMA symbol: Hap
- Strunz classification: 8.BN.05
- Crystal system: Hexagonal
- Crystal class: Dipyramidal (6/m); H-M symbol (6/m)
- Space group: P6_{3}/m
- Unit cell: a = 9.41 Å, c = 6.88 Å; Z = 2

Identification
- Formula mass: 502.31 g/mol
- Color: Colorless, white, gray, yellow, yellowish green
- Crystal habit: As tabular crystals and as stalagmites, nodules, in crystalline to massive crusts
- Cleavage: Poor on {0001} and {101̅0}
- Fracture: Conchoidal
- Tenacity: Brittle
- Mohs scale hardness: 5
- Luster: Vitreous to subresinous, earthy
- Streak: White
- Diaphaneity: Transparent to translucent
- Specific gravity: 3.14–3.21 (measured), 3.16 (calculated)
- Optical properties: Uniaxial (−)
- Refractive index: n_{ω} = 1.651 n_{ε} = 1.644
- Birefringence: δ = 0.007

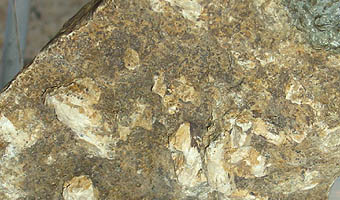
Hydroxyapatite crystals on matrix

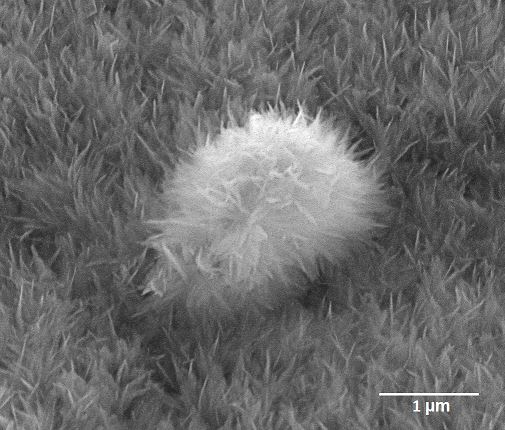
Needle-like hydroxyapatite crystals on stainless steel. Scanning electron microscope picture from University of Tartu.

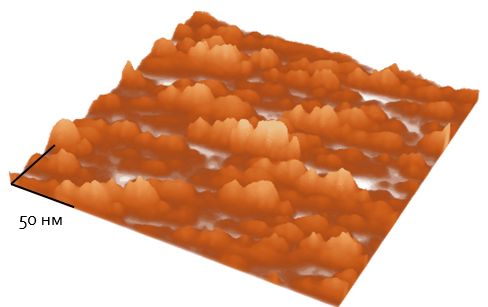
Nanoscale coating of Ca-HAp, image taken with scanning probe microscope

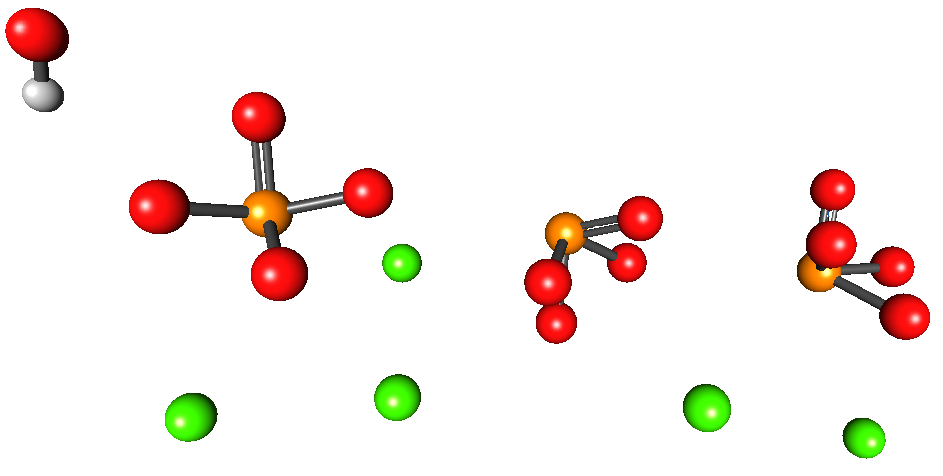
A 3D visualization of half of a hydroxyapatite unit cell, from x-ray crystallography

Hydroxyapatite (IMA name: hydroxylapatite) (Hap, HAp, or HA) is a naturally occurring mineral form of apatite with the formula Ca_{5}(PO_{4})_{3}(OH), often written Ca_{10}(PO_{4})_{6}(OH)_{2} to denote that the crystal unit cell comprises two entities. It is the hydroxyl endmember of the complex apatite group. The OH^{−} ion can be replaced by fluoride or chloride, producing fluorapatite or chlorapatite. It crystallizes in the hexagonal crystal system. Pure hydroxyapatite powder is white. Naturally occurring apatites can, however, also have brown, yellow, or green colorations, comparable to the discolorations of dental fluorosis.

Up to 50% by volume and 70% by weight of human bone is a modified form of hydroxyapatite, known as bone mineral. Carbonated calcium-deficient hydroxyapatite is the main mineral of which dental enamel and dentin are composed. Hydroxyapatite crystals are also found in pathological calcifications such as those found in breast tumors, as well as calcifications within the pineal gland (and other structures of the brain) known as corpora arenacea or "brain sand".

== Chemical synthesis ==
Hydroxyapatite can be synthesized via several methods, such as wet chemical deposition, biomimetic deposition, sol-gel route (wet-chemical precipitation) or electrodeposition. The hydroxyapatite nanocrystal suspension can be prepared by a wet chemical precipitation reaction following the reaction equation below:

10 Ca(OH)_{2} + 6 H_{3}PO_{4} → Ca_{10}(PO_{4})_{6}(OH)_{2} + 18 H_{2}O

The ability to synthetically replicate hydroxyapatite has invaluable clinical implications, especially in dentistry. Each technique yields hydroxyapatite crystals of varied characteristics, such as size and shape. These variations have a marked effect on the biological and mechanical properties of the compound, and therefore these hydroxyapatite products have different clinical uses.

== Calcium-deficient hydroxyapatite ==
Calcium-deficient (non-stoichiometric) hydroxyapatite, Ca_{10−x}(PO_{4})_{6−x}(HPO_{4})_{x}(OH)_{2−x} (where x is between 0 and 1) has a Ca/P ratio between 1.67 and 1.5. The Ca/P ratio is often used in the discussion of calcium phosphate phases. Stoichiometric apatite Ca_{10}(PO_{4})_{6}(OH)_{2} has a Ca/P ratio of 10:6 normally expressed as 1.67. The non-stoichiometric phases have the hydroxyapatite structure with cation vacancies (Ca^{2+}) and anion (OH^{−}) vacancies. The sites occupied solely by phosphate anions in stoichiometric hydroxyapatite, are occupied by phosphate or hydrogen phosphate, HPO_{4}^{2−}, anions. These calcium-deficient phases can be prepared by precipitation from a mixture of calcium nitrate and diammonium phosphate with the desired Ca/P ratio, for example, to make a sample with a Ca/P ratio of 1.6:

9.6 Ca(NO_{3})_{2} + 6 (NH_{4})_{2}HPO_{4} → Ca_{9.6}(PO_{4})_{5.6}(HPO_{4})_{0.4}(OH)_{1.6}

Sintering these non-stoichiometric phases forms a solid phase which is an intimate mixture of tricalcium phosphate and hydroxyapatite, termed biphasic calcium phosphate:

Ca_{10−x}(PO_{4})_{6−x}(HPO_{4})_{x}(OH)_{2−x} → (1 − x) Ca_{10}(PO_{4})_{6}(OH)_{2} + 3x Ca_{3}(PO_{4})_{2}

== Biological function ==
=== Mammals (including humans) ===
Hydroxyapatite is present in bones and teeth; bone is made primarily of HA crystals interspersed in a collagen matrix—65 to 70% of the mass of bone is HA. Similarly HA is 70 to 80% of the mass of dentin and enamel in teeth. In enamel, the matrix for HA is amelogenins and enamelins instead of collagen. Importantly, hydroxyapatite-coated orthopedic implants perform better in certain patients. For instance, for patients with steatotic liver disease hydroxyapatite-coated titanium has superior properties. Hence, the potential of hydroxyapatite in the engineering of biomaterials is considered substantial.

Hydroxyapatite deposits in tendons around joints results in the medical condition calcific tendinitis.

Hydroxyapatite is a constituent of calcium phosphate kidney stones.

==== Remineralisation of tooth enamel ====
Effect of fluoridation on hydroxyapatite in tooth enamel

Remineralisation of tooth enamel involves the reintroduction of mineral ions into demineralised enamel. Hydroxyapatite is the main mineral component of enamel in teeth. During demineralisation, calcium and phosphorus ions are drawn out from the hydroxyapatite. The mineral ions introduced during remineralisation restores the structure of the hydroxyapatite crystals.

When fluoride ions are present during the remineralisation process, either through water fluoridation or the use of fluoride-containing toothpaste, the stronger and more acid-resistant fluorapatite crystals form instead of hydroxyapatite crystals.

=== Mantis shrimp ===
The clubbing appendages of the Odontodactylus scyllarus (peacock mantis shrimp) are made of an extremely dense form of the mineral which has a higher specific strength; this has led to its investigation for potential synthesis and engineering use. Their dactyl appendages have excellent impact resistance due to the impact region being composed of mainly crystalline hydroxyapatite, which offers significant hardness. A periodic layer underneath the impact layer composed of hydroxyapatite with lower calcium and phosphorus content (thus resulting in a much lower modulus) inhibits crack growth by forcing new cracks to change directions. This periodic layer also reduces the energy transferred across both layers due to the large difference in modulus, even reflecting some of the incident energy.

== Use in medicine ==
=== Dentistry ===
As of 2019, the use of hydroxyapatite, or its synthetically manufactured form, nano-hydroxyapatite, is not yet common practice. Some studies suggest it is useful in counteracting dentine hypersensitivity, preventing sensitivity after teeth bleaching procedures and cavity prevention. Avian eggshell hydroxyapatite can be a viable filler material in bone regeneration procedures in oral surgery.

==== Dentine sensitivity ====
Nano-hydroxyapatite possesses bioactive components which can prompt the mineralisation process of teeth, remedying hypersensitivity. Hypersensitivity of teeth is thought to be regulated by fluid within dentinal tubules. The movement of this fluid as a result of different stimuli is said to excite receptor cells in the pulp and trigger sensations of pain. The physical properties of the nano-hydroxyapatite can penetrate and seal the tubules, stopping the circulation of the fluid and therefore the sensations of pain from stimuli. Nano-hydroxyapatite would be preferred as it parallels the natural process of surface remineralisation.

In comparison to alternative treatments for dentine hypersensitivity relief, nano-hydroxyapatite containing treatment has been shown to perform better clinically. Nano-hydroxyapatite was proven to be better than other treatments at reducing sensitivity against evaporative stimuli, such as an air blast, and tactile stimuli, such as tapping the tooth with a dental instrument. However, no difference was seen between nano-hydroxyapatite and other treatments for cold stimuli. Hydroxylapatite has shown significant medium and long-term desensitizing effects on dentine hypersensitivity using evaporative stimuli and the visual analogue scale (alongside potassium nitrate, arginine, glutaraldehyde with hydroxyethyl methacrylate, hydroxyapatite, adhesive systems, glass ionomer cements and laser).

==== Co-agent for bleaching ====
Teeth bleaching agents release reactive oxygen species which can degrade enamel. To prevent this, nano-hydroxyapatite can be added to the bleaching solution to reduce the impact of the bleaching agent by blocking pores within the enamel. This reduces sensitivity after the bleaching process.

==== Cavity prevention ====
Nano-hydroxyapatite possesses a remineralising effect on teeth and can be used to prevent damage from carious attacks. In the event of an acid attack by cariogenic bacteria, nano-hydroxyapatite particles can infiltrate pores on the tooth surface to form a protective layer. Furthermore, nano-hydroxyapatite may have the capacity to reverse damage from carious assaults by either directly replacing deteriorated surface minerals or acting as a binding agent for lost ions.

In some toothpaste hydroxyapatite can be found in the form of nanocrystals (as these are easily dissolved). In recent years, hydroxyapatite nanocrystals (nHA) have been used in toothpaste to combat dental hypersensitivity. They aid in the repair and remineralisation of the enamel, thus helping to prevent tooth sensitivity. Tooth enamel can become demineralised due to various factors, including acidic erosion and dental caries. If left untreated this can lead to the exposure of dentin and subsequent exposure of the dental pulp. In various studies the use of nano hydroxyapatite in toothpaste showed positive results in aiding the remineralisation of dental enamel. In addition to remineralisation, in vitro studies have shown that toothpastes containing nano-hydroxyapatite have the potential to reduce biofilm formation on both tooth enamel and resin-based composite surfaces.

==== As a dental material ====
Hydroxyapatite is widely used within dentistry and oral and maxillofacial surgery, due to its chemical similarity to hard tissue.

In the future, there are possibilities for using nano-hydroxyapatite for tissue engineering and repair. The main and most advantageous feature of nano-hydroxyapatite is its biocompatibility. It is chemically similar to naturally occurring hydroxyapatite and can mimic the structure and biological function of the structures found in the resident extracellular matrix. Therefore, it can be used as a scaffold for engineering tissues such as bone and cementum. It may be used to restore cleft lips and palates and refine existing practices such as preservation of alveolar bone after extraction for better implant placement.

==== Safety concerns ====
The European Commission's Scientific Committee on Consumer Safety (SCCS) issued an official opinion in 2021, where it considered whether the nanomaterial hydroxyapatite was safe when used in leave-on and rinse-off dermal and oral cosmetic products, taking into account reasonably foreseeable exposure conditions. It stated:

Having considered the data provided, and other relevant information available in scientific literature, the SCCS cannot conclude on the safety of the hydroxyapatite composed of rod–shaped nanoparticles for use in oral-care cosmetic products at the maximum concentrations and specifications given in this Opinion. This is because the available data/information is not sufficient to exclude concerns over the genotoxic potential of HAP-nano.

The European Commission's Scientific Committee on Consumer Safety (SCCS) reissued an updated opinion in 2023, where it cleared rod-shaped nano hydroxyapatite of concerns regarding genotoxicity, allowing consumer products to contain concentrations of nano hydroxyapatite as high as 10% for toothpastes and 0.465% for mouthwashes. However, it warns of needle-shaped nano hydroxyapatite and of inhalation in spray products. It stated:

Based on the data provided, the SCCS considers hydroxyapatite (nano) safe when used at concentrations up to 10% in toothpaste, and up to 0.465% in mouthwash. This safety evaluation only applies to the hydroxyapatite (nano) with the following characteristics:

– composed of rod-shaped particles of which at least 95.8% (in particle number) have an aspect ratio of less than 3, and the remaining 4.2% have an aspect ratio not exceeding 4.9;

– the particles are not coated or surface modified.

In July 2025, the Scientific Committee on Consumer Safety (SCCS) adopted its fourth opinion (Submission IV), concluding that nano‑hydroxyapatite is safe at concentrations up to 29.5% in toothpaste and up to 10% in mouthwash, under defined particle morphology constraints.

=== Dermal filler ===
In 2006, the US Food and Drug Administration approved an injectable dermal filler form of calcium hydroxyapatite (Radiesse) for the correction of moderate-to-severe facial folds, such as nasolabial folds, and for the restoration of volume in cases of HIV-associated facial lipoatrophy. The formulation typically consists of synthetic, smooth calcium hydroxyapatite microspheres (20–45 μm in diameter) suspended in a carboxymethylcellulose carrier gel. Upon injection in the skin, the gel provides immediate mechanical volumization, while the microspheres function as a scaffold for the endogenous production of collagen, elastin, and proteoglycans. This process is reported to lead to increases in skin thickness and structural elasticity. Clinical applications include jawline augmentation, hand rejuvenation, and the treatment of midface volume loss. Calcium hydroxyapatite is biodegradable, with the microspheres eventually undergoing macrophage-mediated phagocytosis and metabolic clearance over a period of approximately 12 to 30 months.

== Chromatography ==
Along with its medical applications, hydroxyapatite is also used in downstream applications under mixed-mode chromatography in polishing step. The ions present on the surface of hydroxyapatite make it an ideal candidate with unique selectivity, separation and purification of biomolecule mixtures. In mixed-mode chromatography, hydroxyapatite is used as the stationary phase in chromatography columns.

The combined presence of calcium ions (C- sites) and phosphate sites (P-sites) provide metal affinity and ion exchange properties respectively. The C-sites on the surface of the resin undergo metal affinity interactions with phosphate or carboxyl groups present on the biomolecules. Concurrently, these positively charged C-sites tend to repel positively charged functional groups (e.g., amino groups) on biomolecules. P-sites undergo cationic exchange with positively charged functional groups on biomolecules. They exhibit electrostatic repulsion with negatively charged functional groups on biomolecules. For the elution of molecules buffer with high concentration of phosphate and sodium chloride is used. The nature of different charged ions on the surface of hydroxyapatite provides the framework for unique selectivity and binding of biomolecules, facilitating robust separation of biomolecules.

Hydroxyapatite is available in different forms and in different sizes for the purpose of protein purification. The advantages of hydroxyapatite media are its high product stability and uniformity in various lots during its production. Generally, hydroxyapatite was used in the polishing step of monoclonal antibodies, isolation of endotoxin free plasmids, purification of enzymes and viral particles.

== Use in archaeology ==
In archaeology, hydroxyapatite from human and animal remains can be analysed to reconstruct ancient diets, migrations and paleoclimate. The mineral fractions of bone and teeth act as a reservoir of trace elements, including carbon, oxygen and strontium.

Stable isotope analysis of human and faunal hydroxyapatite can be used to indicate whether a diet was predominantly terrestrial or marine in nature (carbon, strontium); the geographical origin and migratory habits of an animal or human (oxygen, strontium) and to reconstruct past temperatures and climate shifts (oxygen).

Post-depositional alteration of bone can contribute to the degradation of bone collagen, the protein required for stable isotope analysis.

== Research ==
Due to its high biocompatibility, bioactivity, osteoconductive and/or osteoinductive capacity, nontoxicity, nonimmunogenic properties, and noninflammatory behavior, hydroxyapatite is available and used as a bone filler and as coatings on prostheses.

Designing bone scaffolds with a higher capability of promoting bone regeneration is a topical research subject. Composite 3D scaffolds for bone tissue engineering based on nano-hydroxyapatite and poly-ε-caprolactone were designed. The 3D composite scaffolds showed good cytocompatibility and osteogenic potential, which is specifically recommended in applications when faster mineralization is needed, such as osteoporosis treatment.

== See also ==
- Calcium hydroxyphosphate
- Calcific tendinitis (hydroxyapatite crystal deposition disease)
- Mechanical properties of biomaterials
- Silver diammine fluoride
