= Brain injury =

Destruction or degeneration of brain cells

- Other names: Brain damage, neurotrauma
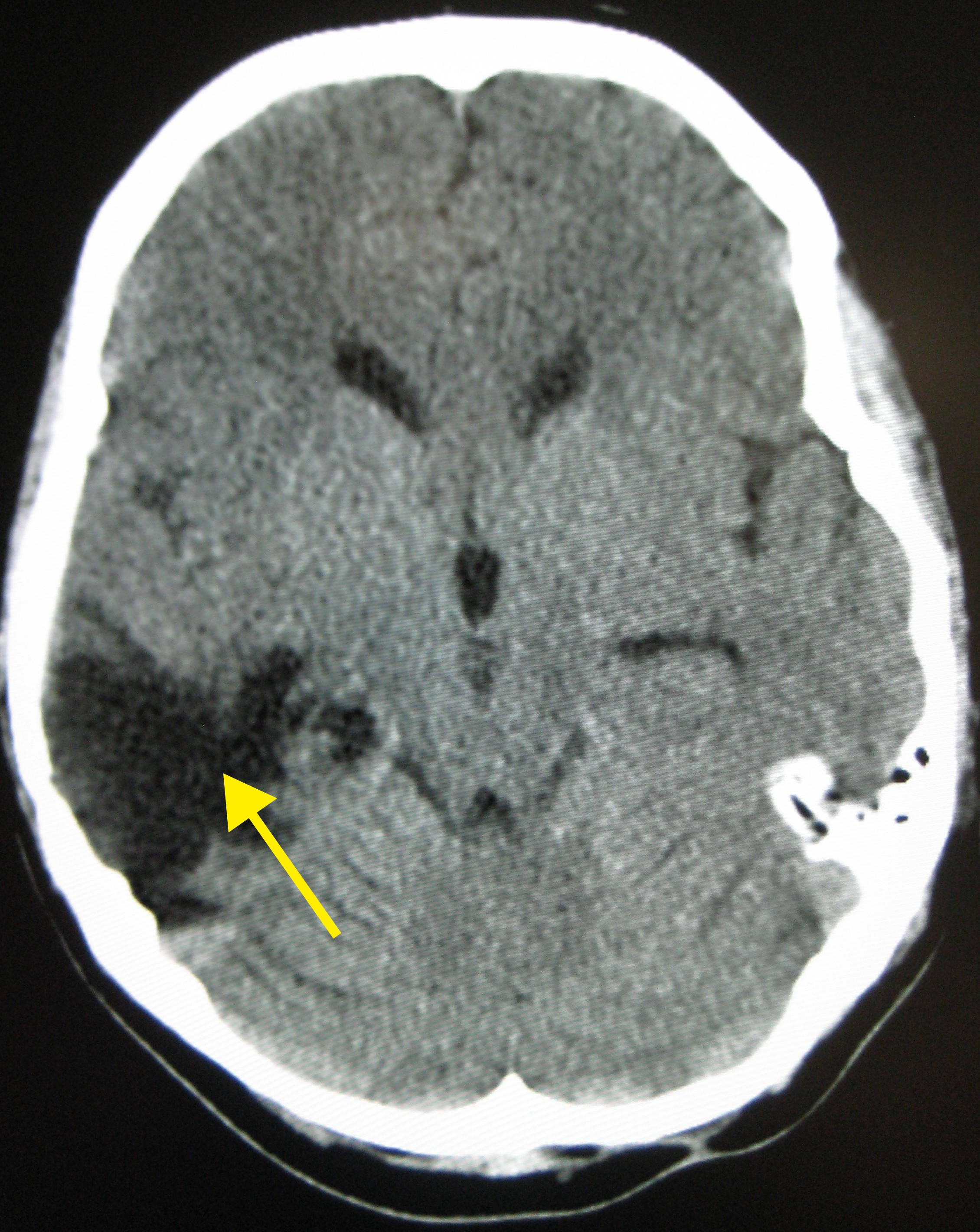
- A CT of the head years after a traumatic brain injury showing an empty space where the damage occurred, marked by the yellow arrow in the bottom left
- Specialty: Neurology, Psychiatry
- Symptoms: Depending on brain area injured
- Types: Acquired brain injury (ABI), traumatic brain injury (TBI), focal and diffuse brain injury, primary and secondary

Brain injury, also known as brain damage or neurotrauma, is the destruction or degeneration of brain cells. It may result from external trauma, such as accidents or falls, or from internal factors, such as strokes, infections, or metabolic disorders.

Traumatic brain injury (TBI), the most common type of brain injury, is typically caused by external physical trauma to the head. Acquired brain injuries occur after birth, in contrast to congenital brain injuries that patients are born with.

In addition, brain injuries can be classified by timing: primary injuries occur at the moment of trauma, while secondary injuries develop afterward due to physiological responses. They can also be categorized by location: focal injuries affect specific areas, whereas diffuse injuries involve widespread brain regions.

The symptoms and complications of brain injuries vary greatly depending on the area(s) of the brain injured, the individual case, the cause of the injury and whether the person receives treatment. People may suffer from headaches, vomit or lose consciousness (potentially falling into a coma or a similar disorder of consciousness) after a brain injury. Long-term cognitive impairment, disturbances in language and motor skills, emotional dysfunction and changes in personality are common.

Treatments for brain injuries include preventing further injuries, medication, physical therapy, psychotherapy, occupational therapy and surgery. Because of neuroplasticity, the brain can partially recover function by forming new neural connections to compensate for damaged areas. Patients may regain adaptive skills such as movement and speech, especially if they undergo therapy and practice.

== Classification ==
=== Focal and diffuse ===
Focal brain injuries affect only a single area of the brain; they result from direct force to the head and manifest as haemorrhages, contusions, and subdural and epidural haematomas. Diffuse brain injuries cause widespread damage to all or many areas, and are caused by diffuse axonal injuries, hypoxia, ischaemia and vascular injuries. If both are severe, focal brain injuries are deadlier than diffuse ones; severe focal and diffuse injuries have mortality rates of 40% and 25% respectively. Although, diffuse brain injuries more often result in long-term neurological and cognitive deficits.

=== Primary and secondary ===
Primary brain injuries, most of which are traumatic brain injuries, occur directly because of mechanical forces that deform the brain. Secondary brain injuries result from conditions, such as hypoxia, ischaemia, oedema, hydrocephalus and intracranial hypertension, that may or may not be the aftereffects of primary brain injuries.

== Signs and symptoms ==
Symptoms of brain injuries vary based on the severity of the injury, the area of the brain injured, and how much of the brain was affected. The three categories used for classifying the severity of brain injuries are mild, moderate and severe.

=== Severity of injuries ===
==== Mild brain injuries ====
When caused by a blow to the head, a mild brain injury is known as a concussion. Symptoms of a mild brain injury include headaches, confusion, tinnitus, fatigue and changes in sleep patterns, mood or behavior. Other symptoms include trouble with memory, concentration, attention or thinking. Because mental fatigue can be attributed to many disorders, patients may not realise the connection between fatigue and a minor brain injury.

==== Moderate/severe brain injuries ====
Cognitive symptoms include confusion, aggression, abnormal behavior and slurred speech. Physical symptoms include a loss of consciousness, headaches that worsen or do not go away, vomiting or nausea, convulsions, brain pulsation, abnormal dilation of the eyes, inability to wake from sleep, weakness in extremities and a loss of coordination.

=== Symptoms in children ===
Young children could be unable to communicate their physical states, emotions and thought processes, so parents, physicians and caregivers may need to observe their behaviours to discern symptoms. Signs include changes in eating habits, persistent anger, sadness, attention loss, losing interest in activities they used to enjoy, or sleep problems.

== Complications ==
=== Physiological effects ===
Physiological complications of a brain injury, caused by damage to the neurons, nerve tracts or sections of the brain, can occur immediately or at varying times after the injury. The immediate response can take many forms. Initially, there may be symptoms such as swelling, pain, bruising, or loss of consciousness. Headaches, dizziness and fatigue, which can develop as time progresses, may become permanent or persist for a long time.

Brain damage predisposes patients to seizures, Parkinson's disease, dementia and hormone-secreting gland disorders; monitoring is essential for detecting the development of these diseases and treating them promptly.

Diffuse brain injuries, brain injuries that result in intracranial hypertension and brain injuries affecting parts of the brain responsible for consciousness may induce a coma, a prolonged period of deep unconsciousness. Severe brain injuries may cause a persistent vegetative state in which a patient displays wakefulness without any awareness of their surroundings.

Brain death occurs when all activity of the brain is deemed to have irreversibly ceased. The prerequisite for considering brain death is the presence of an injury, bodily status (e.g. hyperpyrexia) or disease that has severely damaged the entire brain. After this has been confirmed, the criteria for ascertaining brain death are an absence of brain activity 24 hours after a patient has been resuscitated, an absence of brainstem reflexes (including the pupillary response and gag reflex) and an absence of spontaneous breathing when the lungs are filled with carbon dioxide.

=== Cognitive effects ===
Post-traumatic amnesia, and issues with both long- and short-term memory, are common with brain damage, as is temporary aphasia, or impairment of language. Tissue damage and loss of blood flow caused by the injury may cause both of these issues to become permanent. Apraxia, the impairment of motor coordination and movement, has also been documented.

Cognitive effects can depend on the location of the brain that was damaged, and certain types of impairments can be attributed to damage to certain areas of the brain. Larger lesions tend to cause worse symptoms and more complicated recoveries.

Brain lesions in Wernicke's and Broca's areas are correlated with language, speech and category-specific disorders. Wernicke's aphasia is associated with word retrieval deficits, unknowingly making up words (neologisms), and problems with language comprehension. The symptoms of Wernicke's aphasia are caused by damage to the posterior section of the superior temporal gyrus.

Damage to Broca's area typically produces symptoms like omitting functional words (agrammatism), sound production changes, alexia, agraphia, and problems with comprehension and production. Broca's aphasia is indicative of damage to the posterior inferior frontal gyrus of the brain.

The impairment of a cognitive process following a brain injury does not necessarily indicate that the damaged area is wholly responsible for the process that is impaired. For example, in pure alexia, the ability to read is destroyed by a lesion damaging both the left visual field and the connection between the right visual field and the language areas (Broca's area and Wernicke's area). However, this does not mean one with pure alexia is incapable of comprehending speech—merely that there is no connection between their working visual cortex and language areas—as is demonstrated by the fact that people with pure alexia can still write, speak, and even transcribe letters without understanding their meaning.

Lesions to the fusiform gyrus often result in prosopagnosia, the inability to distinguish faces and other complex objects from each other. Lesions in the amygdala would eliminate the enhanced activation seen in occipital and fusiform visual areas in response to fear with the area intact. Amygdala lesions change the functional pattern of activation to emotional stimuli in regions that are distant from the amygdala.

Other lesions to the visual cortex have different effects depending on the location of the damage. Lesions to V1, for example, can cause blindsight in different areas of the brain depending on the size of the lesion and location relative to the calcarine fissure. Lesions to V4 can cause color-blindness, and bilateral lesions to MT/V5 can cause the loss of the ability to perceive motion. Lesions to the parietal lobes may result in agnosia, an inability to recognize complex objects, smells, or shapes, or amorphosynthesis, a loss of perception on the opposite side of the body.

=== Psychological effects ===
There are documented cases of lasting psychological effects as well, such as emotional changes often caused by damage to the various parts of the brain that control emotions and behaviour. Individuals may experience sudden, severe mood swings that subside quickly. Emotional changes, which may not be triggered by a specific event, can cause distress to the injured party and their family and friends. Brain injuries increase the risk of developing depression, bipolar disorder and schizophrenia. The more severe a brain injury is the likelier it is to cause bipolar disorder or schizophrenia; the correlation between brain injuries and mental illness is stronger in female and older patients. Often, counseling in either a one-on-one or group setting is suggested for those who experience emotional dysfunction after their injury.

Any type of acquired brain injury can result in changes in personality, including, with regards to the Big Five personality traits, increased neuroticism, decreased extraversion and decreased conscientiousness. If the patient is aware of the change in their cognitive capacity, personality and mental state after an injury, they might feel disconnected from their pre-injury identity, leading to irritability, emotional distress and a disrupted concept of self.

== Causes ==
=== External causes ===
==== Head injuries ====
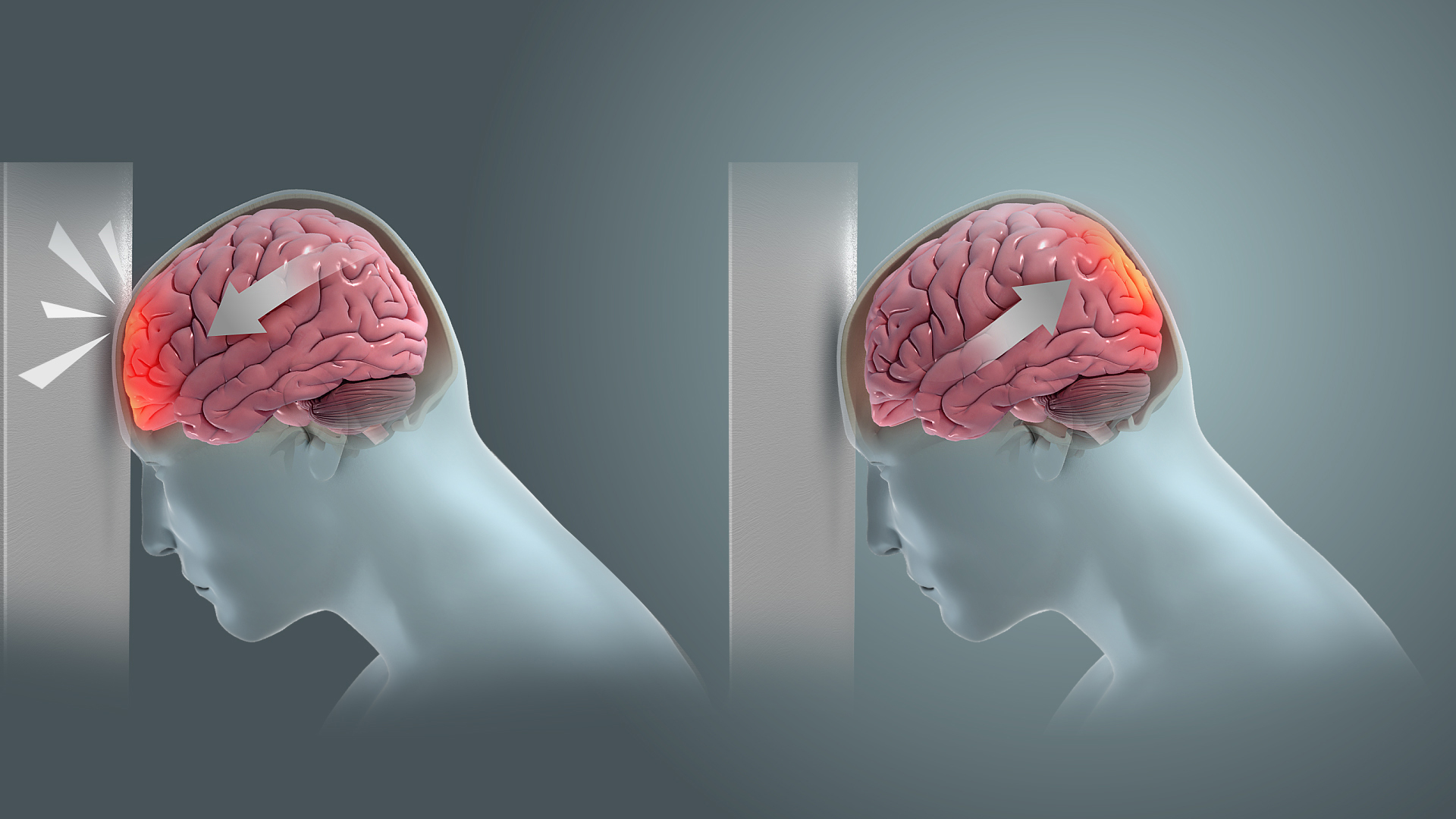
A coup injury occurs under the site of impact with an object, and a contrecoup injury occurs on the side opposite the area that was hit.

Brain injuries are commonly caused by impacts to the head, such as coup and contrecoup injuries, penetrating head injuries, diffuse axonal injuries and blast injuries. In these cases the injuries are referred to as traumatic brain injuries, or TBIs.

In a coup injury, the head is struck by an object, causing the brain to hit the side of the cranium that hit the object. In a contrecoup injury, an object comes into collision with the head; the brain bounces back from the impact and hits the side of the cranium opposite the object. Both coup and contrecoup injuries cause contusions to the affected area of the brain, but contrecoup injuries are more severe than coup injuries.

A diffuse axonal injury is caused by shearing forces on the brain that lead to lesions in the brain's white matter tracts. These shearing forces are seen in cases, such as traffic accidents, in which the brain had a sharp rotational acceleration, and are caused by the difference in density between white matter and grey matter.

Penetrating head trauma results from gunshot wounds, stabbings and other incidents in which an object breaches the skull and the dura mater. The object, along its path of motion, creates cavitations; haemorrhages and haematoma result when the cavitations expand and retract. It is the most lethal form of traumatic brain injury, as 70-90% of victims die before reaching the hospital.

Blast injuries originate from explosions and are divided into primary (injuries from the blast wave itself), secondary (wounds from shrapnel), tertiary (nonpenetrating projectile impacts and injuries from falls) and quaternary (other injuries, such as burns). Head injuries sustained close to a blast's epicenter are largely fatal, but those sustained from a distance are often mild or moderate.

==== Iatrogenic ====
Brain lesions are sometimes intentionally inflicted during neurosurgery to treat epilepsy and other neurological disorders. These lesions are induced by excision, by electric shocks (electrolytic lesions) to the exposed brain or by infusion of excitotoxins to specific areas.

=== Pathological causes ===
==== Stroke ====
There are two major types of strokes, haemorrhagic and ischaemic, both of which cause brain damage. Haemorrhagic strokes occur when a blood vessel in the brain ruptures; those that bleed into the parenchyma are intracerebral haemorrhages and those that bleed into the subarachnoid space are subarachnoid haemorrhages. Blood leaks around the brain, increasing the intracranial pressure and compressing the brain tissue. Ischaemic strokes occur when circulation to a brain region is obstructed by a thrombosis or embolism; the brain regions dependent on the obstructed vessel infarct, depriving brain cells of blood supply and causing them to die.

==== Genetic disorders ====
Many genetic mutations and hereditary diseases manifest as brain degeneration in childhood, in adolescence or in adulthood. Those that present during childhood are known collectively as childhood dementia, as they produce a progressive deterioration of cognitive abilities similar to adult-onset dementia. They are typically inborn errors of metabolism such as lysosomal storage disorders, in which enzyme or protein defects cause storage material to accumulate in neurons, resulting in neurodegeneration; the mechanism by which this causes neurodegeneration is unclear. Examples of disorders of childhood dementia include Niemann–Pick disease type C, Sanfilippo syndrome, Batten disease and Lafora disease.

Huntington's disease damages the cerebral cortex, resulting in chorea and other issues with motor abilities.

An example of a hereditary neurodegenerative disease whose symptoms appear in adulthood is Huntington's disease, which passes down in an autosomal dominant pattern. A mutation on the short arm of chromosome 4p16.3 causes aggregation and accumulation of the Huntingtin protein; brain atrophy follows. Symptoms usually present between the ages of 30 and 50 and comprise motor disturbances, behavioural issues and cognitive decline. Motor symptoms, caused by the deterioration of the cerebral cortex, include chorea, hyperkinesia, hypokinesia, dysarthria and dysphagia; psychiatric symptoms, caused by deterioration of the frontal lobe, include irritability, depression, aggression and flat affect; and cognitive symptoms include inattentiveness, memory loss and a decline in executive functioning.

==== Other neurodegenerative diseases ====
There are also neurodegenerative diseases that are not completely hereditary or genetic in origin, including Alzheimer's disease, Parkinson's disease, multiple sclerosis and amyotrophic lateral sclerosis.

The precise cause of Alzheimer's disease, the commonest type of dementia, is unknown, but amyloid plaques and neurofibrillary tangles, which lead to neuroinflammation, loss of synaptic connections and neurodegeneration, have been discovered in autopsies of people who died from complications of it. Alzheimer's disease presents with gradual memory loss and decline in cognitive, verbal, motor and executive skills. The period between diagnosis and death varies; though some patients die within five years of diagnosis others live ten years or longer.

In Parkinson's disease an accumulation of Lewy bodies leads to neuroinflammation and oxidative stress. Motor circuits of the basal ganglia are set off balance when neurons produce insufficient quantities of dopamine, inducing the motor symptoms typical of Parkinson's, including bradykinesia (slow movements), resting tremor and abnormal posturing. 70–89% of Parkinson's disease patients experience neurological and psychiatric symptoms like depression, anxiety, cognitive impairment and dementia.

Multiple sclerosis is an autoimmune condition that causes focal inflammation and neurodegeneration, leading to the development of plaques in the brain that manifest as visual impairment, numbness, bowel and bladder dysfunction and cognitive impairment.

Amyotrophic lateral sclerosis, the most common motor neuron disease, is characterised by the degeneration of neurons in the motor cortex, spinal cord and brainstem, which are replaced by glial cells. Symptoms vary but include exaggerated reflexes, dysphagia, spasticity, a loss of coordination, muscle atrophy and general weakness. Cognitive impairment presents in 30% to 50% of patients.

==== Neoplasms ====
Malignant tumours of the brain can either develop in the brain or spread to it from cancer of other organs, whereas benign tumours necessarily originate within the brain. Both classes of brain tumours result in brain damage by infiltrating or compressing parts of the brain. The types of primary brain tumours include astrocytomas, gliomas, glioblastomas, oligoastrocytomas, ependymomas, medulloblastomas, pineocytomas and pineoblastomas, meningiomas, hemangiopericytomas and craniopharyngiomas. Yet most cases of brain tumours are metastatic, originating from lung cancer, breast cancer and melanoma.

Symptoms of brain tumours include seizures, headaches, loss of appetite, nausea and vomiting, personality and emotional changes, weakness and issues with concentration, vision, hearing and speech.

==== Infectious diseases ====
Bacterial, viral and fungal infections targeting the head or central nervous system can damage the brain by causing inflammation, which is known as encephalitis when it affects the brain. Bacterial meningitis, an infection of the meninges caused by bacteria like Streptococcus, results in cerebral infarction and vascular inflammation. Complications of this affect 25% of meningitis patients and include seizures, cognitive impairment, motor impairment, aphasia and vision and hearing loss.

Viral encephalitis and viral meningitis, which are caused commonly by the herpes simplex and Epstein-Barr viruses, occur when the virus in question triggers an inflammatory response that disrupts the function of neurons and leads to cerebral oedema, haemorrhage and vascular congestion. Leukocytes and microglial cells may be interfered with as well. Hallucinations, behavioural changes, Parkinsonian symptoms and cognitive decline may result.

Mucormycosis, a fungal infection of the family Mucoraceae afflicting patients with diabetes and other immunocompromising conditions, can infect the nasal cavity or sinuses and thereby make its way to the brain, where it is called rhinocerebral mucormycosis. In advanced cases the fungus infiltrates blood vessels, including the carotid artery, in or associated with the brain, leading to thrombosis and stroke. Symptoms such as gait disturbances, altered state of consciousness, seizures and dizziness may develop.

==== Wernicke–Korsakoff syndrome ====
Wernicke–Korsakoff syndrome, caused by a vitamin B1 (thiamine) deficiency, can result in brain damage. This syndrome presents with two conditions, Wernicke's encephalopathy and Korsakoff psychosis. Typically Wernicke's encephalopathy precedes symptoms of Korsakoff psychosis. Wernicke's encephalopathy results from focal accumulation of lactic acid, causing problems with vision, coordination, and balance.

Korsakoff psychosis typically follows after the symptoms of Wernicke's decrease. Wernicke-Korsakoff syndrome is typically caused by conditions causing thiamine deficiency, such as chronic heavy alcohol use or by conditions that affect nutritional absorption, including colon cancer, eating disorders and gastric bypass.

=== Environmental causes ===
==== Chemotherapy ====
Chemotherapy can cause brain damage to the neural stem cells and oligodendrocyte cells that produce myelin. This is commonly known as "chemo brain". The radiation and chemotherapy can lead to brain tissue damage by disrupting or stopping blood flow to the affected areas of the brain. This damage can cause long term effects such as, but not limited to, memory loss, confusion and loss of cognitive function. The brain damage caused by radiation depends on where the brain tumor is located, the amount of radiation used, and the duration of the treatment.

==== Poisoning ====
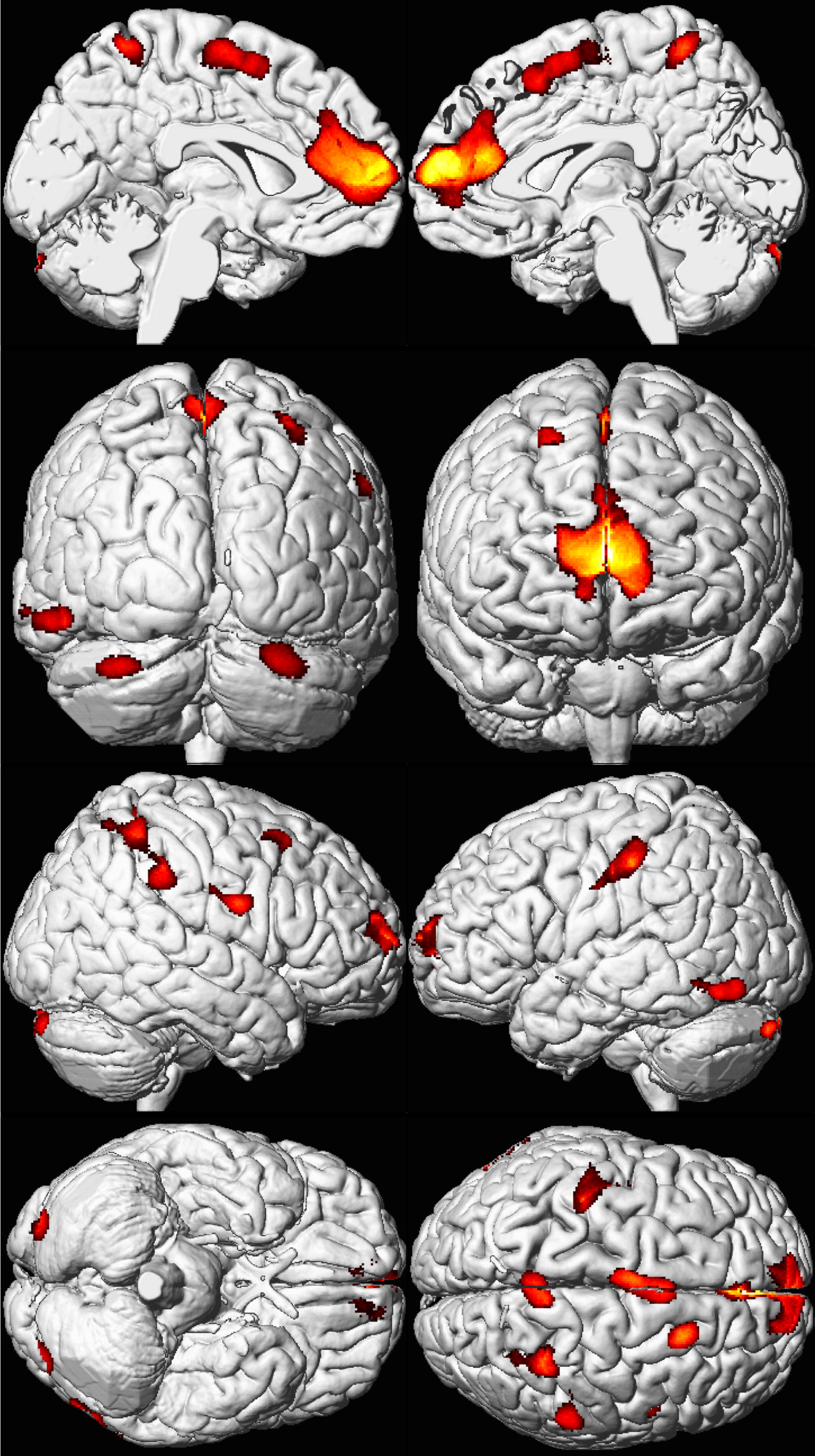
The brain regions in red and yellow are lower in volume in people who were exposed to high amounts of lead during childhood than in people who were not.

Exposure to toxic substances can result in brain injury and stunted neurological development in children. Mercury, for instance, is a common element in manufacturing processes but is detrimental to human health, particularly neurological health. When mercury deposits in the central nervous system it atrophies the cerebellum, the postcentral gyri and the calcarine sulcus of the brain. Children who were exposed to high doses of methylmercury, a highly toxic form of mercury, or whose mothers were exposed while pregnant with them, are significantly likelier than the general population to have intellectual disabilities, cerebral palsy, developmental delays and epilepsy.

Lead, a metal ubiquitous in gasoline and household paints in the United States until it was banned from gasoline in 1972 and paint in 1978, causes neurological sequelae in both low-dose chronic exposures and sudden higher-dose exposures. Lead binds to various proteins throughout the human body; this interferes with the synaptic pruning process that children undergo and leads to cognitive and behavioural impairments. In extreme doses, lead can disrupt calcium receptors, break down cell membrane components and render the blood–brain barrier more permeable; lead encephalopathy results, which manifests as cerebral edema, seizures, coma and death.

== Diagnosis ==
The Glasgow Coma Scale (GCS) is the most widely used scoring system to assess the severity of a brain injury. The scale is based on three traits: whether the person can open their eyes, whether they can speak coherently and whether they can follow a command to move. Eye opening is worth 4 points, speech is worth 5 and motor ability is worth 6. Severe brain injuries score 3–8, moderate brain injuries score 9–12 and mild brain injuries score 13–15.

There are several imaging techniques that can aid in diagnosing and assessing the extent of brain damage, such as computed tomography (CT) scan, magnetic resonance imaging (MRI), diffusion tensor imaging (DTI), magnetic resonance spectroscopy (MRS), positron emission tomography (PET), and single-photon emission tomography (SPECT). CT scans and MRI are the two widely used techniques and are the most effective. CT scans can show brain haemorrhages, fractures of the skull and fluid buildup in the brain that will lead to increased cranial pressure.

MRI scans are better at detecting smaller injuries, injuries inside of the brain, diffuse axonal injuries, injuries to the brainstem, injuries to the posterior fossa and injuries to the subtemporal and subfrontal regions. However, patients with pacemakers, metallic implants or other metal within their bodies cannot undergo MRI scans. Typically the other imaging techniques are not used in clinical settings because they are costly and not as widely available.

== Management ==
=== Emergency care ===
The treatment for emergency traumatic brain injuries focuses on assuring the person has enough oxygen from the brain's blood supply, and on maintaining normal blood pressure to avoid further injuries of the head or neck. Early intervention to maintain oxygen and normal blood pressure can reduce further brain damage and improve recovery outcomes. A catheter can be inserted into a ventricle of the brain to monitor the intracranial pressure and guide treatment decisions.

Patients should be intubated if they exhibit a Glasgow Coma Score lower than 8, severe facial fractures, severe hypertension, signs of transtentorial herniation or signs of neurodegeneration unrelated to a physical injury.

=== Medication ===
In the case of brain damage from traumatic brain injury, corticosteroids like dexamethasone, cortisone, and prednisone may be used to decrease intracranial pressure. Another corticosteroid, mannitol, may be administered for transtentorial herniation or neurological deterioration.

=== Surgery ===
Surgical interventions, or whether surgery is performed at all, are determined by the type of injury. Surgery is rarely required for TBIs, as most are mild.

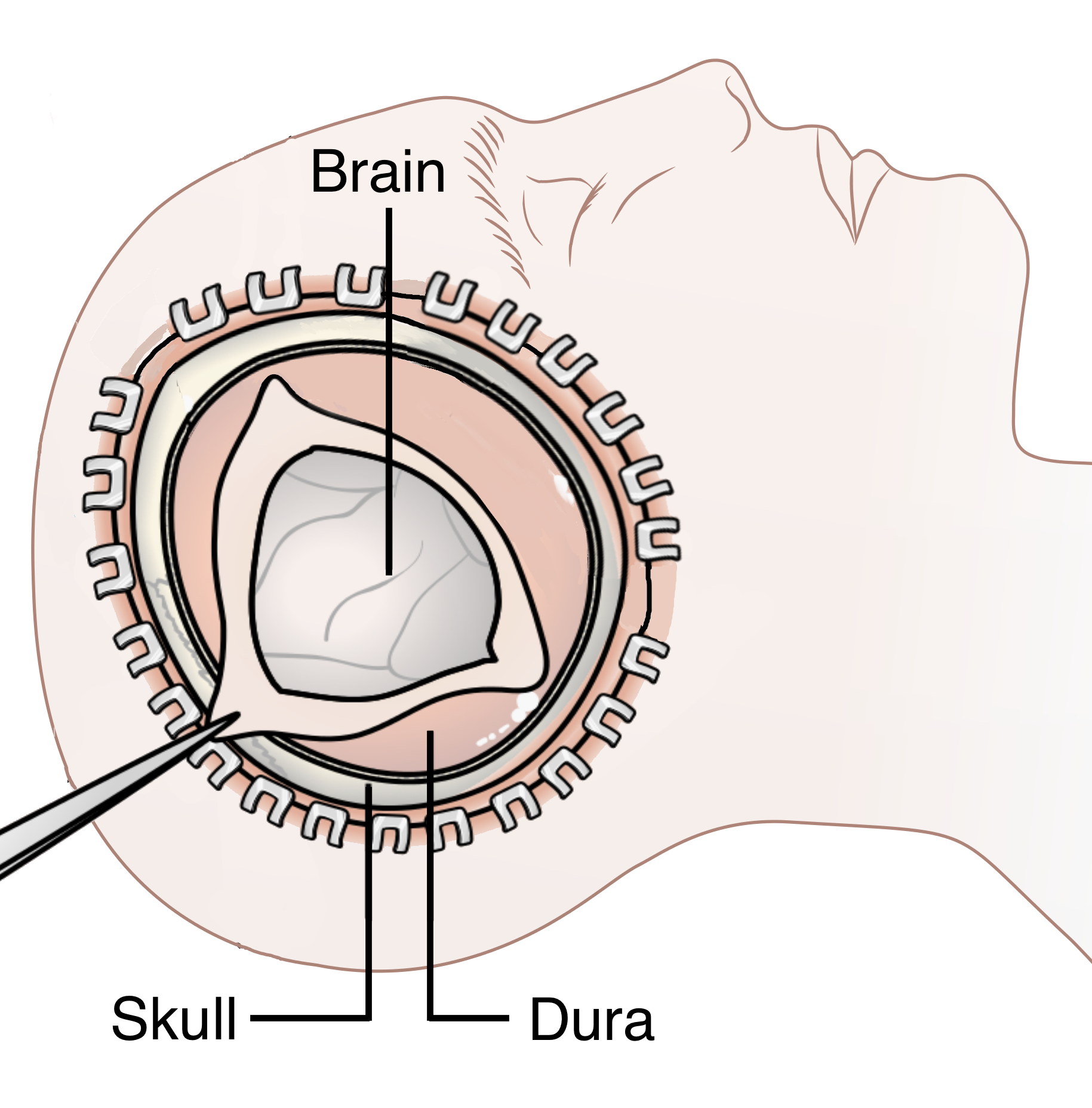
A decompressive craniectomy is performed to remove brain lesions and damaged bone.

Epidural and subdural haematomas, which raise the intracranial pressure and compress regions of the brain, must be surgically evacuated to prevent brain herniation and death. If herniation, which can have causes other than haematoma, has already occurred, the lesion responsible for it (e.g. a tumour or a cerebral oedema) can still be removed. The evacuation is done through either a decompressive craniectomy, where the section of skull incised is not replaced after the operation, or a craniotomy, where the section is replaced.

For a penetrating head wound, a surgeon may perform a craniectomy to remove damaged bone, an evacuation of any haematoma and a repair of the dura mater. The projectile itself does not necessarily need to be removed, and its removal is usually incidental to another procedure.

=== Rehabilitation ===
Various professions may be involved in the medical care and rehabilitation of someone with an impairment after a brain injury. Neurologists, neurosurgeons, and physiatrists are physicians specialising in treating brain injury. Neuropsychologists (especially clinical neuropsychologists) are psychologists specialising in understanding the effects of brain injury and may be involved in assessing the severity or creating rehabilitation strategies. Occupational therapists may be involved in running rehabilitation programs to help restore lost function or relearn essential skills. Registered nurses, such as those working in hospital intensive care units, are able to maintain the health of the severely brain-injured through constant administration of medication and neurological monitoring, including the use of the Glasgow Coma Scale used by other health professionals to quantify a patient's state of consciousness.

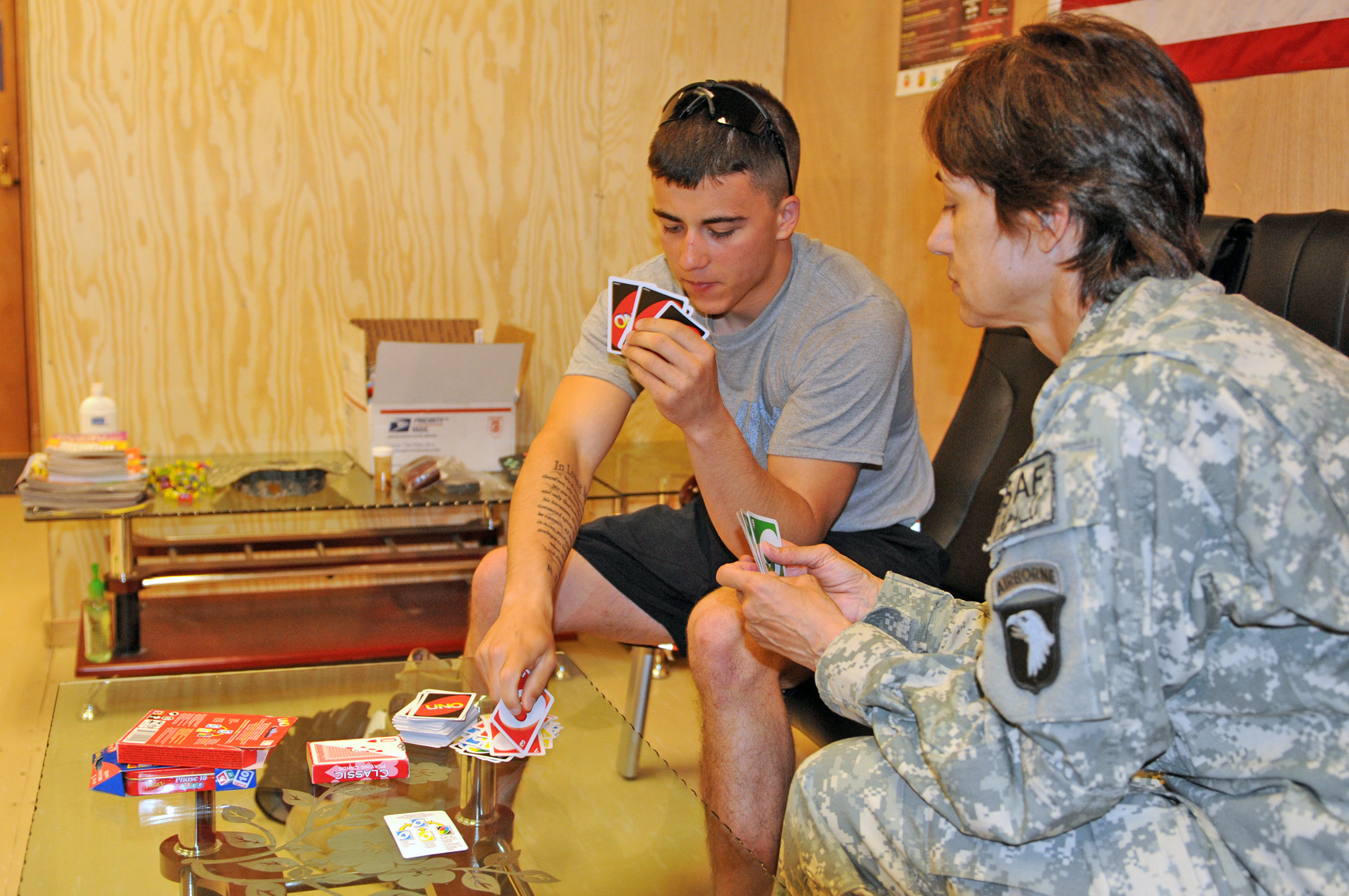
A United States Army veteran (left) who sustained a mild TBI in a blast teaches an officer (right) how to play Uno. Mentally stimulating games and activities help patients regain cognitive function.

Physiotherapists also play a significant role in rehabilitation after a brain injury. In the case of a traumatic brain injury, physiotherapy during the post-acute phase may include sensory stimulation, serial casting and splinting, fitness and aerobic training, and functional training. Sensory stimulation is supposed to help a patient regain sensory perception through the use of modalities. There is no evidence to support the efficacy of this intervention. Serial casting and splinting are often used to reduce soft tissue contractures and muscle tone. Evidence-based research reveals that serial casting can be used to increase passive range of motion (PROM) and decrease spasticity.

Functional training may also be used to treat patients with TBIs. To date, no studies support the efficacy of sit-to-stand training, arm ability training and body weight support systems (BWS). Overall, studies suggest that patients with TBIs who participate in more intense rehabilitation programs will see greater improvements in functional skills. More research is required to better understand the efficacy of the treatments mentioned above.

== Prognosis ==
The prognosis of a brain injury depends on its presentation, cause and location. It is difficult to predict the outcome of a brain injury, as victims of minor injuries may experience severe symptoms and complications; even a mild concussion can have long-term effects that may not resolve. A common misconception is that people who experience brain damage cannot fully recover. Though not every patient returns to pre-injury levels of cognitive functioning, it is not impossible. In general, neuroregeneration can occur in the peripheral nervous system but is much rarer and more difficult to assist in the central nervous system (brain or spinal cord). However, in neural development in humans, areas of the brain can learn to compensate for other damaged areas, and may increase in size and complexity and even change function, just as someone who loses a sense may gain increased acuity in another sense—a process termed neuroplasticity.

Adults aged 60 or older tend to experience worse outcomes, including greater psychosocial limitations, longer periods of coma, increased complications and slower recovery, even when the initial injury is equivalent in severity to that of a younger individual. This is because older individuals experience age-related changes in brain structure and function, and have reduced physiological reserves. As children's brains are still developing, outcomes of pediatric brain injuries are more difficult to predict than adults'. In the case of a child with frontal brain injury, for example, the impact of the damage may be undetectable until that child fails to develop normal executive functions in their late teens and early twenties.

== History ==
The connection between brain injuries and functional impairments was first documented in the 16th century BC, in the Edwin Smith Papyrus of Ancient Egypt. The manuscript stated, for the first time in recorded history, that injuries to the meninges resulted in stiffness of the neck, that lesions of the cerebrum resulted in paralysis and that temporal lobe damage resulted in aphasia. It recommended that head injuries be treated by rubbing grease across the site of the injury, dressing open wounds if there was not a skull fracture and ensuring that the patient sat upright. In Ancient Greece in the 1st millennium BC, the physicians Hippocrates, Celsus and Galen remarked that traumatic brain injuries were often followed by a loss of consciousness.

In the 16th century AD, Italian physician Jacopo Berengario da Carpi wrote in his treatise De Fractura Calvae sive Craniei that brain injuries resulted in vomiting, haemorrhages, aphasia and vertigo. In 1825, French physician Jean-Baptiste Bouillaud, inspired by other scientists' case reports and experiments, first proposed that lesions of the frontal lobe were responsible for disturbances in speech, though he did not discover that the localisation was left-sided.

In 1848, a railroad construction foreman named Phineas Gage was paving way for a new railroad line when an explosion sent a tamping iron through his frontal lobe. Gage retained his functional abilities but reportedly became rude, inconsiderate and indecisive after the accident; John Martyn Harlow, the physician who treated Gage, stated that Gage had previously been friendly and respectful. 60% of psychology textbooks published between 1983 and 1998 cover Gage's case, which is, according to neuroscientist Malcolm Macmillan, "the most famous case of personality change after brain damage".

Broca's area (blue) and Wernicke's area (green)

In the 1860s, Paul Broca examined two patients exhibiting impaired speech. Broca's first patient, Louis Victor Leborgne, lacked productive speech and could utter only the syllable "tan". Broca, who met Leborgne in 1861, saw Leborgne's case as an opportunity to address Bouillaud's theory that language skills were localised to the frontal lobe. After Leborgne died the same year, an autopsy revealed that he did, in fact, have a lesion in his left frontal lobe. The second patient, Lazare Lelong, who had suffered a stroke the year before Broca met him, was similarly aphasic, able to utter only five words (two of which were mispronunciations). Lelong's autopsy showed that he also had a left frontal lobe lesion. The results of both cases became critical evidence in understanding the left hemisphere's role in speech production. The affected area is known today as Broca's area and the condition as Broca's aphasia.

In 1874, a German neuroscientist, Carl Wernicke, published a case report on a stroke patient who experienced neither speech nor hearing impairments, but had lost his ability to comprehend spoken and written language. After the patient's death, an autopsy found a lesion located in the left temporal region. This area became known as Wernicke's area and the condition as Wernicke's aphasia. Wernicke later hypothesized that there was a relationship between Wernicke's area and Broca's area, which was later proved correct.

In 1928, pathologist Harrison Martland reported upon a phenomenon of what he called "punch drunk", in which boxers who suffered many blows to the head during their careers went on to develop dementia, Parkinsonian symptoms and other cognitive disorders. After examining five patients and analysing the reports of 18 more, he theorised that repeated head trauma causes glial cells in the brain to proliferate, leading to neurological dysfunction and encephalitis. Physicians previously did not believe that complications of head trauma could appear long after the injury had occurred. In 1940, psychiatrists Abram Blau and Karl Murdoch Bowman described the case of a 28-year-old boxer with a history of cognitive impairment and psychosis, and coined the term "chronic traumatic encephalopathy" to replace "punch drunk".

== Epidemiology ==
=== Traumatic brain injuries ===
An average of 1,691,481 people (576.8 per 100,000) were hospitalised in the United States for traumatic brain injuries each year between 2002 and 2006. 1,364,797 (465.4 per 100,000), the vast majority of these patients, were released shortly after being admitted and treated; 275,146 (93.8 per 100,000) were hospitalised but survived, and 51,538 (17.6 per 100,000) died. In 1991, about 1.5 million people out of 46,761 households sustained nonfatal brain injuries, 25% of whom sought no treatment.

70% to 95% of traumatic brain injuries are mild. A study of adults undergoing inpatient rehabilitation for head trauma showed that 19.2% had severe trauma, and 10.3% moderate trauma. The ratio of moderate and severe trauma to mild trauma is probably inflated, as fewer people go to the hospital for mild TBIs.

Traumatic brain injuries are consistently found to occur more often, and to be more severe, in males than in females across all age groups. The average annual TBI rate for men is 998,176, whereas the female rate is 693,329. 17% of men who suffer TBIs are hospitalised and 4% die; 15% of women who suffer TBIs are hospitalised and less than 2% die.

Children between the ages of 0 and 4 and adolescents between the ages of 15 and 19 are the age groups most commonly afflicted by TBIs. However, older adults 75 or older also have a high rate of TBIs, and are 3 times as likely than the average TBI patient to die and 3.5 times as likely to be hospitalised.

There is a correlation between alcohol consumption and traumatic brain injuries; between 56% and 72% of people presenting to the hospital with a TBI have a positive blood alcohol concentration. Someone who has previously had a TBI is likely to have another; people who experience one TBI are 2.3 to 3 times more likely than the general population to experience a second, and people who experience a second TBI are 7.8 to 9 times more likely to experience a third. Repeated TBIs are associated with alcohol use.

Most TBIs in the civilian population are caused by falls, traffic accidents, impacts from objects and physical assault.

Several studies have examined the history of traumatic brain injury (TBI) among incarcerated populations. A systematic review of 33 papers, covering more than 9,000 prisoners, reported that between 9.7% and 100% of inmates had a past history of TBI, with an average prevalence of 46%. Two meta-analyses included in the review yielded average prevalence rates of 41.2% and 60.3%, considerably higher than those observed in the general population. Most investigations assessed inmates' self-reported history of head injury, though only a few used validated screening tools. The review noted that prisoners with a TBI history were predominantly male, with a mean age of 37 years, and often presented with comorbidities such as mental health disorders and alcohol use disorder. Although the high prevalence of a TBI history in prison populations is well documented, the evidence does not establish a causal link between TBI and criminal behavior, and further research is needed.

== See also ==
- Cerebral palsy – Movement disorders that appear in early childhood
- Encephalopathy – Disorders or diseases of the brain
- Epilepsy – Group of neurological disorders causing seizures
- Fetal alcohol spectrum disorder – Group of conditions resulting from maternal alcohol consumption during pregnancy
- Frontal lobe injury – Type of brain injury
- Head injury – Serious trauma to the cranium
- Infinity Walk – Therapeutic method for progressively developing coordination
- Lobotomy – Discredited neurosurgical operation
- Myogenesis – Formation of muscular tissue, particularly during embryonic development
- Nerve injury – Damage to nervous tissue
- Neurocognition – Cognitive functions linked to specific neural systems
- Neurology – Medical specialty dealing with disorders of the nervous system
- Primary and secondary brain injury – Medical condition
- Rehabilitation (neuropsychology) – Therapy to regain or improve neurocognitive function that has been lost or diminished
- Synaptogenesis – Formation of neuronal junctions in the nervous system
- Traumatic brain injury – Injury of the brain from an external source
