= Infinity Walk =

Therapeutic method for progressively developing coordination

- Specialty: Occupational therapy

Infinity Walk is a therapeutic exercise for progressively developing coordination. It is typically used in those with brain injuries or learning disabilities.

A beginning student or patient learns to walk smoothly in a figure-eight pattern while looking at an object or person across the room. As they become able to do that consistently, other physical and mental activities are added to the coordinated walking. An advanced walker can maintain a smooth figure-eight walk while doing several other activities, e.g., simultaneously gesturing and doing mental arithmetic as they converse with their teacher or therapist.

Developed in the 1980s by clinical psychologist Deborah Sunbeck. It strives to improve the sensorimotor functioning of those who practice it. In developing the method, Sunbeck also applied knowledge of social facilitation and intrinsic motivation to the task of creating a self-motivating method of physical and mental skill-building that would help the user develop resilient self-regulated learning strategies for future challenges.

== Uses ==
- It has been used by U.S. physical and occupational therapists in the rehabilitation of persons with brain injuries.
- It has been used developing multisensory integration in occupational therapy, including some clients with learning disabilities.
