= Corpora arenacea =

Small mineral concentrations in the brain

Brain sand
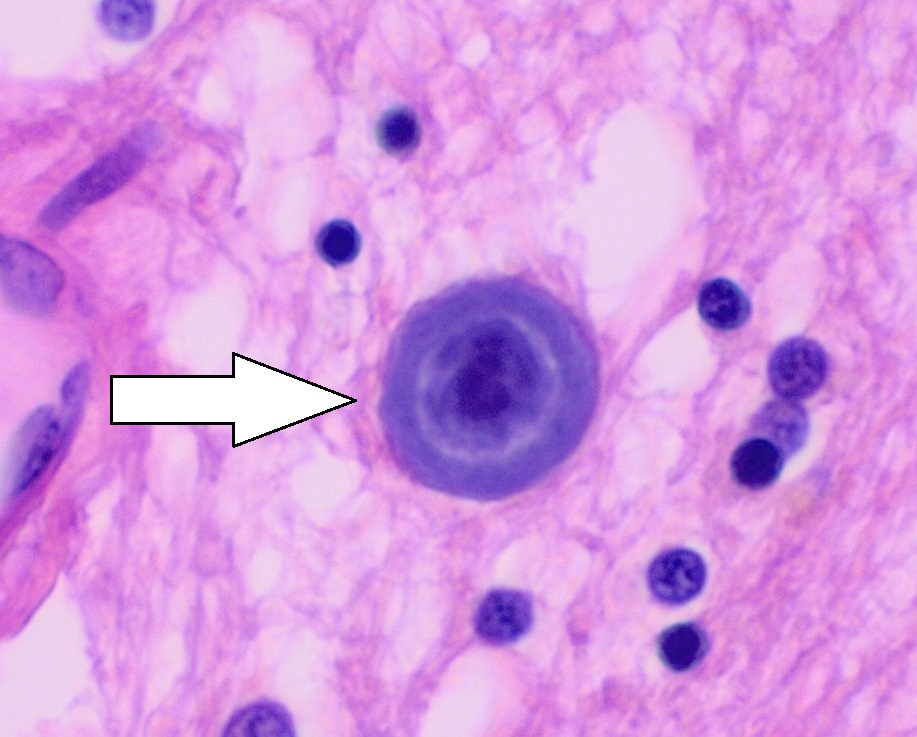
- Histopathology of a corpus arenaceum in cerebral white matter

Details

Identifiers
- Latin: corpora arenacea
- TH: H3.08.02.3.00007

Corpora arenacea (singular: corpus arenaceum, also called brain sand or acervuli or psammoma bodies or pineal concretions) are calcified structures in the pineal gland and other areas of the brain such as the choroid plexus. Older organisms have numerous corpora arenacea, whose function, if any, is unknown. Concentrations of "brain sand" increase with age, so the pineal gland becomes increasingly visible on X-rays over time, usually by the third or fourth decade. They are sometimes used as anatomical landmarks in radiological examinations.

Chemical analysis shows that they are composed of calcium phosphate (later characterized as hydroxyapatite), calcium carbonate, magnesium phosphate, and ammonium phosphate. Recently, calcite deposits have been described as well.
