= Calcium hydroxyphosphate =

Names
- IUPAC name pentacalcium hydroxide triphosphate

Identifiers
CAS Number	1306-06-5
3D model (JSmol)	Interactive image
ChEMBL	ChEMBL2218916
ChemSpider	26563461
ECHA InfoCard	100.013.769
EC Number	235-330-6
PubChem CID	14781
UNII	91D9GV0Z28
CompTox Dashboard (EPA)	DTXSID50872537 DTXSID10872538, DTXSID50872537
- InChI: InChI=1S/5Ca.3H3O4P.H2O/c;;;;;3*1-5(2,3)4;/h;;;;;3*(H3,1,2,3,4);1H2/q5*+2;;;;/p-10 Key: XYJRXVWERLGGKC-UHFFFAOYSA-D
- SMILES: [OH-].[O-]P(=O)([O-])[O-].[O-]P(=O)([O-])[O-].[O-]P(=O)([O-])[O-].[Ca+2].[Ca+2].[Ca+2].[Ca+2].[Ca+2]

Hazards
- GHS labelling
Pictograms	(GHS07: Exclamation mark)
Signal word	Warning
Hazard statements	H315, H319, H335
Precautionary statements	P261, P264, P271, P280, P302+P352, P304+P340, P305+P351+P338, P312, P321, P332+P313, P337+P313, P362, P403+P233, P405, P501
- Except where otherwise noted, data are given for materials in their standard state (at 25 °C [77 °F], 100 kPa). Infobox references

Calcium hydroxyphosphate (calcium phosphate tribasic, tribasic calcium phosphate, hydroxyapatite, HAp) is an inorganic chemical compound that is made up of calcium, hydrogen, oxygen and phosphorus. Its formula is Ca_{5}(OH)(PO_{4})_{3}.

It is found in the body and as the mineral hydroxyapatite.
