= Collier's sign =

Eyelid retraction, indicating a midbrain lesion

- Symptoms: The sclera can be seen above the cornea, and further upgaze increases the distance between the eyelids and irises.
- Causes: Upper dorsal midbrain supranuclear lesions such as Parinaud's syndrome, 'top of the basilar syndrome', midbrain infarction, neurodegeneration or tumour, multiple sclerosis, encephalitis, and Miller-Fisher syndrome. Damage to the posterior commissure levator inhibitory fibres which originate in the M-group of neurons.
- Differential diagnosis: Midbrain lesion

Collier's sign (also known as Collier's tucked lid sign or posterior fossa stare) is bilateral or unilateral eyelid retraction.

It is an accepted medical sign of a midbrain lesion, first described in 1927 by J Collier. With the eyes in the primary position, the sclera can be seen above the cornea, and further upgaze increases the distance between the eyelids and irises. Causes include upper dorsal midbrain supranuclear lesions such as Parinaud's syndrome, 'top of the basilar syndrome', midbrain infarction, neurodegeneration or tumour, multiple sclerosis, encephalitis, and Miller-Fisher syndrome. The cause is thought to be damage to the posterior commissure levator inhibitory fibres which originate in the M-group of neurons.
