= Pineal gland =

Endocrine gland in the brain of most vertebrates

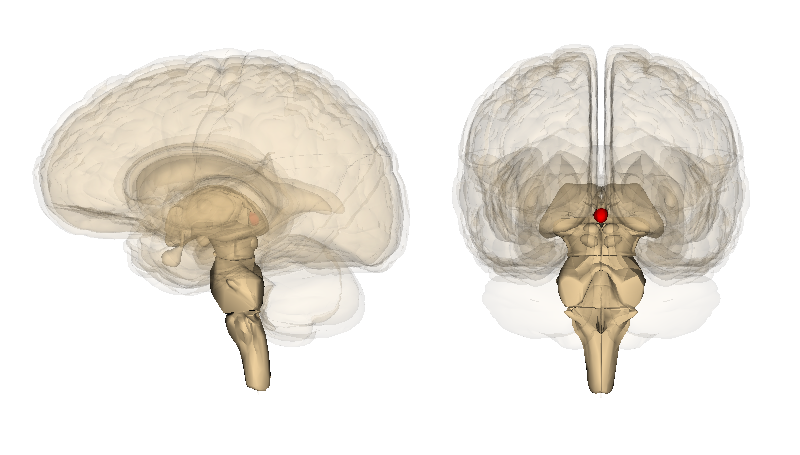
- Pineal gland or epiphysis (in red)

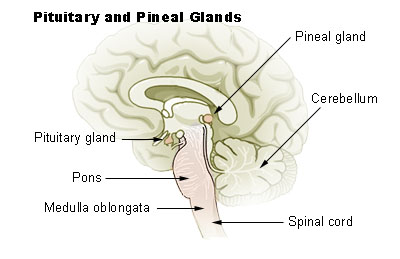
- Diagram of pituitary and pineal glands in the human brain

Details
- Precursor: Neural ectoderm, roof of diencephalon
- Artery: Posterior cerebral artery

Identifiers
- Latin: glandula pinealis
- MeSH: D010870
- NeuroNames: 297
- NeuroLex ID: birnlex_1184
- TA98: A11.2.00.001
- TA2: 3862
- FMA: 62033

The pineal gland (also called the pineal body) is a small endocrine gland in the brain of most vertebrates. It produces melatonin, a serotonin-derived hormone, which modulates sleep patterns following the diurnal cycles. The shape of the gland resembles a pine cone, which gives it its name.

The pineal gland is located in the epithalamus, near the center of the brain, between the two hemispheres, tucked in a groove where the two halves of the thalamus join. It is one of the neuroendocrine secretory circumventricular organs in which capillaries are mostly permeable to solutes in the blood.

The pineal gland is present in almost all vertebrates, but is absent in protochordates, in which there is a simple pineal homologue. The hagfish, archaic vertebrates, lack a pineal gland. In some species of amphibians and reptiles, the gland is linked to a light-sensing organ, variously called the parietal eye, the pineal eye or the third eye. Reconstruction of the biological evolution pattern suggests that the pineal gland was originally a kind of atrophied photoreceptor that developed into a neuroendocrine organ.

Galen in the 2nd century C.E. could not find any functional role and regarded the gland as a structural support for the brain tissue. He gave the name konarion, meaning small cone or pinecone, which during the Renaissance was translated into Latin as pinealis. The 17th-century philosopher René Descartes regarded the gland as the primary locus of mind-body interaction, describing it as the "principal seat of the soul".

== Etymology ==
The word pineal (Latin: pinea, 'conifer cone'), refers to the cone-like shape of the gland, as first used in the 17th century. The term gland derives from the Old French glandre from the 13th century, extended from the Latin glandula to represent an acorn shape.

== Structure ==
The pineal gland is a pine cone-shaped (hence the name), unpaired midline brain structure. It is reddish-gray in colour and about the size of a grain of rice (5–8 mm) in humans. It forms part of the epithalamus. It is attached to the rest of the brain by a pineal stalk. The ventral lamina of the pineal stalk is continuous with the posterior commissure, and its dorsal lamina with the habenular commissure.

=== Location ===
It normally lies in a depression between the two superior colliculi. It is situated between the laterally positioned thalamic bodies, and posterior to the habenular commissure. It is located in the quadrigeminal cistern behind the third ventricle, enclosing the pineal recess.

=== Blood supply ===
Unlike most of the mammalian brain, the pineal gland is not isolated from the body by the blood–brain barrier system; it has profuse blood flow, second only to the kidney, supplied from the choroidal branches of the posterior cerebral artery.

=== Afferents ===
The afferent nerve supply of pineal gland is by the nervus conarii which receives postganglionic sympathetic afferents from the superior cervical ganglion, and parasympathetic afferents from the pterygopalatine ganglia and otic ganglia. According to research on animals, neurons of the trigeminal ganglion that are involved in pituitary adenylate cyclase-activating peptide neuropeptide signaling project the gland.

=== Neural pathway for melatonin production ===
The canonical neural pathway regulating pineal melatonin production begins in the eye with the intrinsically photosensitive ganglion cells of the retina which project inhibitory GABAergic efferents to the paraventricular nucleus of hypothalamus via the retinohypothalamic tract. The paraventricular nucleus in turn projects to the superior cervical ganglia, which finally projects to the pineal gland. Darkness thus leads to disinhibition of the paraventricular nucleus, leading it to activate pineal gland melatonin production by way of the superior cervical ganglia.

=== Microanatomy ===
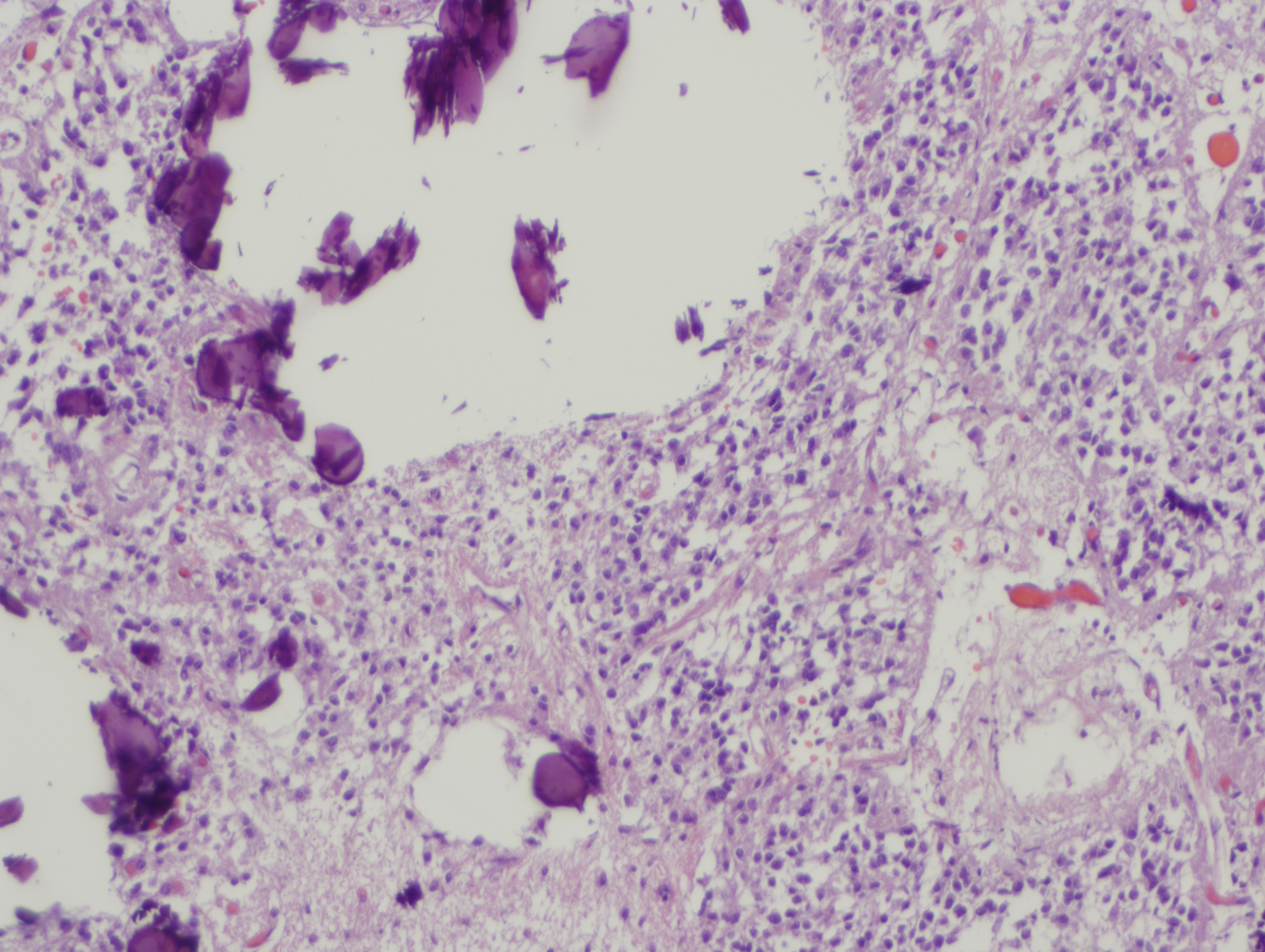
Pineal gland parenchyma with calcifications

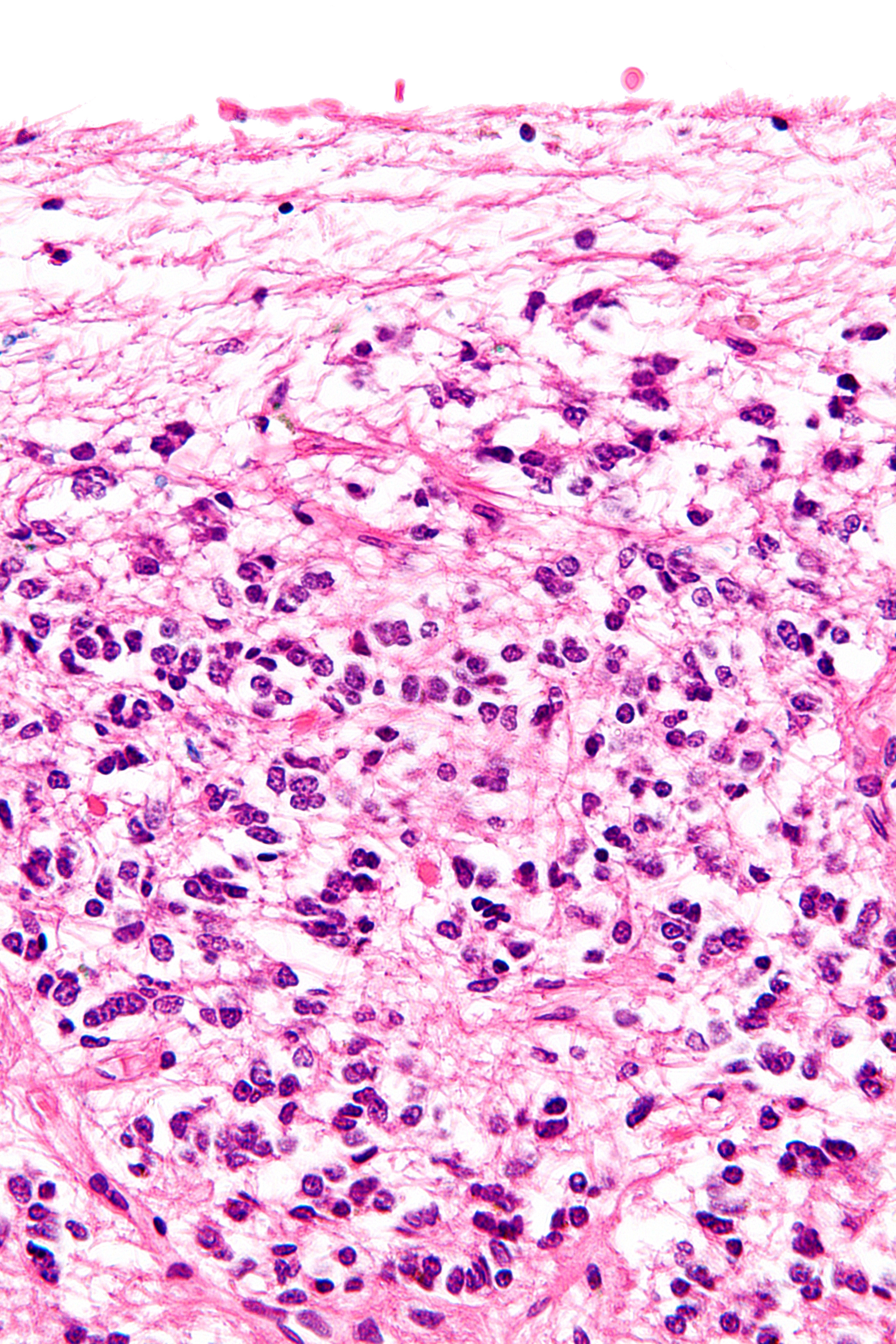
Micrograph of a normal pineal gland – very high magnification

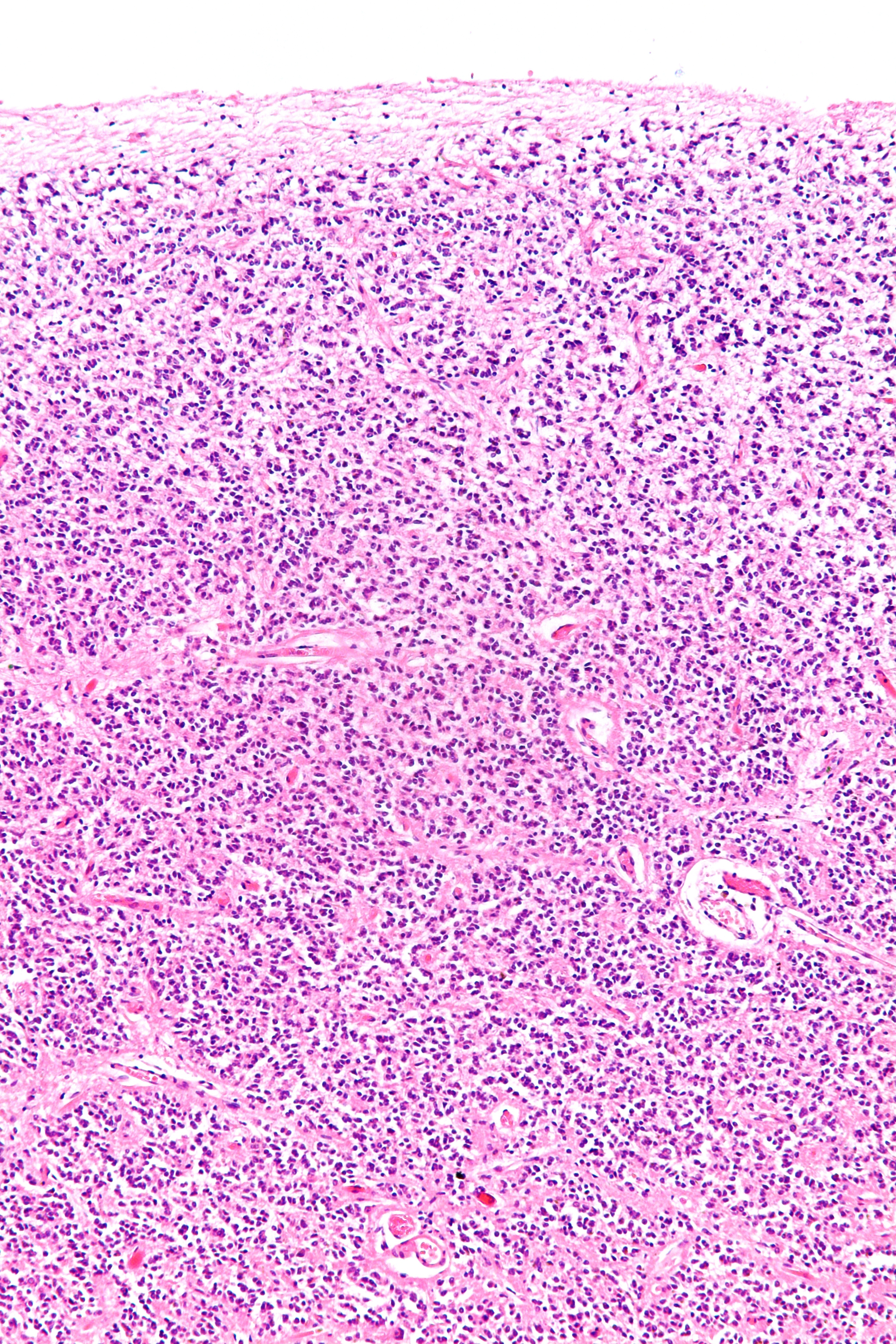
Micrograph of a normal pineal gland – intermediate magnification

The pineal body in humans consists of a lobular parenchyma of pinealocytes surrounded by connective tissue spaces. The gland's surface is covered by a pial capsule.

The pineal gland consists mainly of pinealocytes, but four other cell types have been identified. As it is quite cellular (in relation to the cortex and white matter), it may be mistaken for a neoplasm.

Cell type	Description
Pinealocytes	The pinealocytes consist of a cell body with 4–6 processes emerging. They produce and secrete melatonin. The pinealocytes can be stained by special silver impregnation methods. Their cytoplasm is lightly basophilic. With special stains, pinealocytes exhibit lengthy, branched cytoplasmic processes that extend to the connective septa and its blood vessels.
Interstitial cells	Interstitial cells are located between the pinealocytes. They have elongated nuclei and a cytoplasm that is stained darker than that of the pinealocytes.
Perivascular phagocyte	Many capillaries are present in the gland, and perivascular phagocytes are located close to these blood vessels. The perivascular phagocytes are antigen presenting cells.
Pineal neurons	In higher vertebrates neurons are usually located in the pineal gland. However, this is not the case in rodents.
Peptidergic neuron-like cells	In some species, neuronal-like peptidergic cells are present. These cells might have a paracrine regulatory function.

=== Development ===
The human pineal gland grows in size until about 1–2 years of age, remaining stable thereafter, although its weight increases gradually from puberty onwards. The abundant melatonin levels in children are believed to inhibit sexual development, and pineal tumors have been linked with precocious puberty. When puberty arrives, melatonin production is reduced.

=== Symmetry ===
In the zebrafish the pineal gland does not straddle the midline, but shows a left-sided bias. In humans, functional cerebral dominance is accompanied by subtle anatomical asymmetry.

== Function ==
A principal function of the pineal gland is to produce melatonin, which has various functions in the central nervous system, the most important of which is to help modulate sleep patterns; melatonin production is stimulated by darkness and inhibited by light. Intrinsically photosensitive retinal ganglion cells in the retina detect light and send this signal to the suprachiasmatic nucleus (SCN), synchronizing the SCN to the day-night cycle. Fibers then relay the daylight information to the paraventricular nuclei and spinal cord via the sympathetic nervous system to the superior cervical ganglia, and then to the pineal gland.

=== Regulation of the pituitary gland ===
Studies on rodents suggest that the pineal gland influences the pituitary gland's secretion of the sex hormones, follicle-stimulating hormone (FSH), and luteinizing hormone (LH). Pinealectomy performed on rodents produced no change in pituitary weight, but caused an increase in the concentration of FSH and LH within the gland.

The pineal gland contains receptors for the regulatory neuropeptide endothelin 1, which, when injected in picomolar quantities into the lateral cerebral ventricle, causes a calcium-mediated increase in pineal glucose metabolism.

== Clinical significance ==
=== Calcification ===
Calcification of the pineal gland is typical in young adults, and has been observed in children as young as two years of age. Pineal gland calcification is detrimental to its ability to synthesize melatonin, although it remains inconclusive whether pineal calcification causes sleep problems.

The calcified gland is often seen in skull X-rays. Calcification rates vary widely by country and correlate with an increase in age, with calcification occurring in an estimated 40% of Americans by age seventeen. Calcification of the pineal gland is associated with corpora arenacea, also known as "brain sand".

=== Tumors ===
Tumors of the pineal gland are called pinealomas. These tumors are rare and 50% to 70% are germinomas that arise from sequestered embryonic germ cells. Histologically they are similar to testicular seminomas and ovarian dysgerminomas.

A pineal tumor can compress the superior colliculi and pretectal area of the dorsal midbrain, producing Parinaud's syndrome. Pineal tumors also can cause compression of the cerebral aqueduct, resulting in a noncommunicating hydrocephalus. Other manifestations are the consequence of their pressure effects and consist of visual disturbances, headache, mental deterioration, and sometimes dementia-like behaviour.

These neoplasms are divided into three categories: pineoblastomas, pineocytomas, and mixed tumors, based on their level of differentiation, which, in turn, correlates with their neoplastic aggressiveness. The clinical course of patients with pineocytomas is prolonged, averaging up to several years. The position of these tumors makes them difficult to remove surgically.

=== Other conditions ===
The morphology of the pineal gland differs markedly in different pathological conditions. For instance, it is known that its volume is reduced in both obese patients and those with primary insomnia.

== Other animals ==
Nearly all vertebrate species possess a pineal gland. The most important exception is a primitive vertebrate, the hagfish. Even in the hagfish, however, there may be a "pineal equivalent" structure in the dorsal diencephalon. A few more complex vertebrates have lost pineal glands over the course of their evolution. The lamprey (another primitive vertebrate), however, does possess one. The lancelet Branchiostoma lanceolatum, an early chordate which is a close relative to vertebrates, also lacks a recognizable pineal gland. Protochordates in general do not have the distinct structure as an organ, but they have a mass of photoreceptor cells called lamellar body, which is regarded as a pineal homologue.

The results of various scientific research in evolutionary biology, comparative neuroanatomy and neurophysiology have explained the evolutionary history (phylogeny) of the pineal gland in different vertebrate species. From the point of view of biological evolution, the pineal gland is a kind of atrophied photoreceptor. In the epithalamus of some species of amphibians and reptiles, it is linked to a light-sensing organ, known as the parietal eye, which is also called the pineal eye or third eye. It is likely that the common ancestor of all vertebrates had a pair of photosensory organs on the top of its head, similar to the arrangement in modern lampreys. In many lower vertebrates (such as species of fish, amphibians and lizards), the pineal gland is associated with parietal or pineal eye. In these animals, the parietal eye acts as a photoreceptor, and hence are also known as the third eye, and they can be seen on top of the head in some species. Some extinct Devonian fishes have two parietal foramina in their skulls, suggesting an ancestral bilaterality of parietal eyes. The parietal eye and the pineal gland of living tetrapods are probably the descendants of the left and right parts of this organ, respectively. In support of this explanation, the fossil vertebrate Haikouichthys seems to have possessed four eyes.

During embryonic development, the parietal eye and the pineal organ of modern lizards and tuataras form together from a pocket formed in the brain ectoderm. The loss of parietal eyes in many living tetrapods is supported by developmental formation of a paired structure that subsequently fuses into a single pineal gland in developing embryos of turtles, snakes, birds, and mammals.

The pineal organs of mammals fall into one of three categories based on shape. Rodents have more structurally complex pineal glands than other mammals.

Crocodilians and some tropical lineages of mammals (some xenarthrans (sloths), pangolins, sirenians (manatees and dugongs), and some marsupials (sugar gliders)) have lost both their parietal eye and their pineal organ. Polar mammals, such as walruses and some seals, possess unusually large pineal glands.

All amphibians have a pineal organ, but some frogs and toads also have what is called a "frontal organ", which is essentially a parietal eye.

Pinealocytes in many non-mammalian vertebrates have a strong resemblance to the photoreceptor cells of the eye. Evidence from morphology and developmental biology suggests that pineal cells possess a common evolutionary ancestor with retinal cells.

Pineal cytostructure seems to have evolutionary similarities to the retinal cells of the lateral eyes. Modern birds and reptiles express the phototransducing pigment melanopsin in the pineal gland. Avian pineal glands are thought to act like the suprachiasmatic nucleus in mammals. The structure of the pineal eye in modern lizards and tuatara is analogous to the cornea, lens, and retina of the lateral eyes of vertebrates.

In most vertebrates, exposure to light sets off a chain reaction of enzymatic events within the pineal gland that regulates circadian rhythms. In humans and other mammals, the light signals necessary to set circadian rhythms are sent from the eye through the retinohypothalamic system to the suprachiasmatic nuclei (SCN) and the pineal gland.

The fossilized skulls of many extinct vertebrates have a pineal foramen (opening), which in some cases is larger than that of any living vertebrate. Although fossils seldom preserve deep-brain soft anatomy, the brain of the Russian fossil bird Cerebavis cenomanica from Melovatka, about 90 million years old, shows a relatively large parietal eye and pineal gland.

== History ==
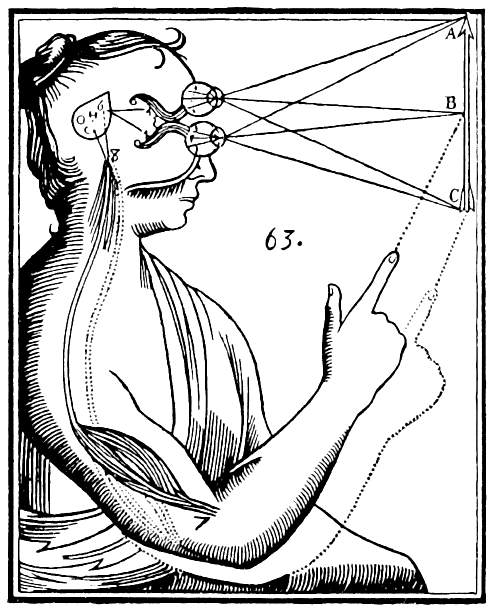
Diagram of the operation of the pineal gland for Descartes in the Treatise of Man (figure published in the edition of 1664)

The secretory activity of the pineal gland is only partially understood. Its location deep in the brain suggested to philosophers throughout history that it possessed particular importance. This combination led to its being regarded as a "mystery" gland with mystical, metaphysical, and occult theories surrounding its perceived functions.

The earliest recorded description of the pineal gland is from the Greek physician Galen in the 2nd century A.D. According to Galen, Herophilus (325–280 B.C.) had already considered the structure as a kind of valve that partitioned the brain chambers, particularly for the flow of vital spirits (pneuma). Specifically, Herophilus believed that the structure was a tap that controlled the movement of vital spirits from the middle (now identified as the third) ventricle to the one in the parencephalis (fourth ventricle).

Galen described the pineal gland in De usu partium corporis humani, libri VII (On the Usefulness of Parts of the Body, Part 8) and De anatomicis administrationibus, libri IX (On Anatomical Procedures, Part 9). He introduced the name κωνάριο (konario, often Latinised as conarium) that means 'cone' (as in 'pinecone') in De usu partium corporis humani. He correctly located the gland as directly lying behind the third ventricle. He argued against the prevailing concept of it as a valve for two basic reasons: it is located outside of the brain tissue and it does not move on its own.

Galen instead identified the valve as a worm-like structure in the cerebellum (later called vermiform epiphysis, known today as the vermis cerebelli or cerebellar vermis). From his study on the blood vessels surrounding the pineal gland he discovered the great vein of the cerebellum, later called the vein of Galen. He could not establish any functional role of the pineal gland and regarded it as a structural support for the cerebral veins.

Seventeenth-century philosopher and scientist René Descartes discussed the pineal gland both in his first book, the Treatise of Man (written before 1637, but only published posthumously 1662/1664), and in his last book, The Passions of the Soul (1649) and he regarded it as "the principal seat of the soul and the place in which all our thoughts are formed". In the Treatise of Man, he described conceptual models of man, namely creatures created by God, which consist of two ingredients, a body and a soul. In the Passions, he split man up into a body and a soul and emphasized that the soul is joined to the whole body by "a certain very small gland situated in the middle of the brain's substance and suspended above the passage through which the spirits in the brain's anterior cavities communicate with those in its posterior cavities". Descartes gave importance to the structure as it was the only unpaired component of the brain.

The Latin name pinealis became popular in the 17th century. For example, English physician Thomas Willis described a glandula pinealis in his book, Cerebri anatome cui accessit nervorum descriptio et usus (1664). Willis criticised Descartes's concept, remarking: "we can scarce[ly] believe this to be the seat of the Soul, or its chief Faculties to arise from it; because Animals, which seem to be almost quite destitute of Imagination, Memory, and other superior Powers of the Soul, have this Glandula or Kernel large and fair enough."

Walter Baldwin Spencer at the University of Oxford gave the first description of the pineal gland in lizards. In 1886, he described an eye-like structure, which he called the pineal eye or parietal eye, that was associated with the parietal foramen and the pineal stalk. The presence of a pineal body was already discovered by German zoologist Franz Leydig in 1872, in European lizards. Leydig called them the "frontal organ" (German: stirnorgan). In 1918, Swedish zoologist Nils Holmgren described the "parietal eye" in frogs and dogfish. He discovered that the parietal eyes were made up of sensory cells similar to the cone cells of the retina, and suggested that it was a primitive light-sensor organ (photoreceptor).

The pineal gland was originally believed to be a "vestigial remnant" of a larger organ. Epiphysan – an extract derived from the pineal glands of cattle – was historically used by veterinarians for rut suppression in mares and cows. In the 1930s it was tested on humans, and resulted in a temporary reduction in their masturbation impulse. In 1917, it was known that extract of cow pineals lightened frog skin. Dermatology professor Aaron B. Lerner and colleagues at Yale University, hoping that a hormone from the pineal gland might be useful in treating skin diseases, isolated it and named it melatonin in 1958. The substance did not prove to be helpful as intended, but its discovery helped solve several mysteries, such as why removing a rat's pineal gland accelerated its ovary growth, why keeping rats in constant light decreased the weight of their pineals, and why pinealectomy and constant light affect ovary growth to an equal extent; this knowledge gave a boost to the then-new field of chronobiology. Of the endocrine organs, the function of the pineal gland was the last to be discovered.

== Society and culture ==
- The notion of a "pineal eye" is central to the philosophy of the French writer Georges Bataille, which is analyzed at length by literary scholar Denis Hollier in his study Against Architecture. In this work, Hollier discusses how Bataille uses the concept of a "pineal-eye" as a reference to a blind-spot in Western rationality, and an organ of excess and delirium. This conceptual device is explicit in his surrealist texts, The Jesuve and The Pineal Eye.
- In the late 19th century Madame Blavatsky, founder of theosophy, identified the pineal gland with the Hindu concept of the third eye, or the Ajna chakra. This association is still popular today.
- The pineal gland has also featured in other religious contexts, such as in the Principia Discordia, which claims it can be used to contact the goddess of discord Eris.
- In the short story "From Beyond" by H. P. Lovecraft, a scientist creates an electronic device that emits a resonance wave, which stimulates an affected person's pineal gland, thereby allowing them to perceive planes of existence outside the scope of accepted reality, a translucent, alien environment that overlaps our own recognized reality. It was adapted as a film of the same name in 1986.
- The 2013 horror film Banshee Chapter is heavily influenced by this short story.
- In the episode 6 from season 18 of American Dad! entitled "The Wondercabinet", Steve, after listening to the radio show about new age mysticism, tries to "astrally project" himself by using his pineal gland to help him understand the meaning of life.

== Additional images ==
The pineal body is labeled in these images.

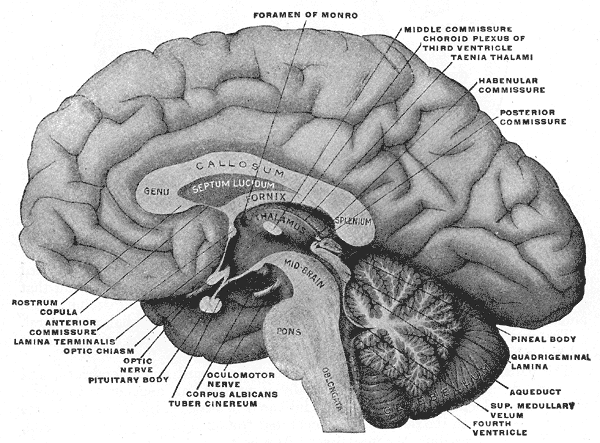
Mesal aspect of a brain sectioned in the median sagittal plane

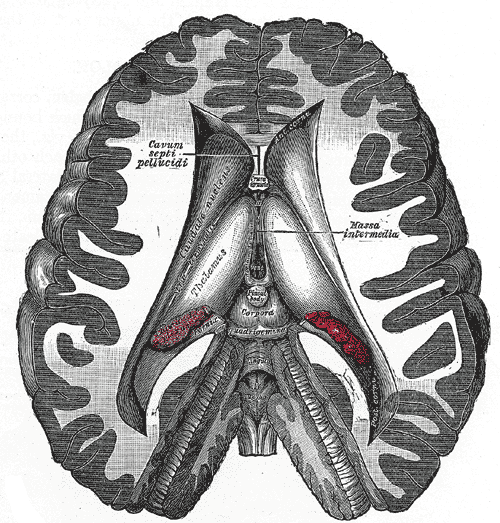
Dissection showing the ventricles of the brain

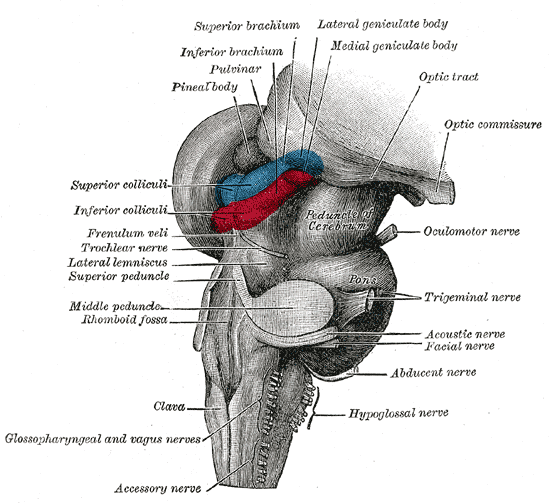
Hind- and mid-brains; antero-lateral view

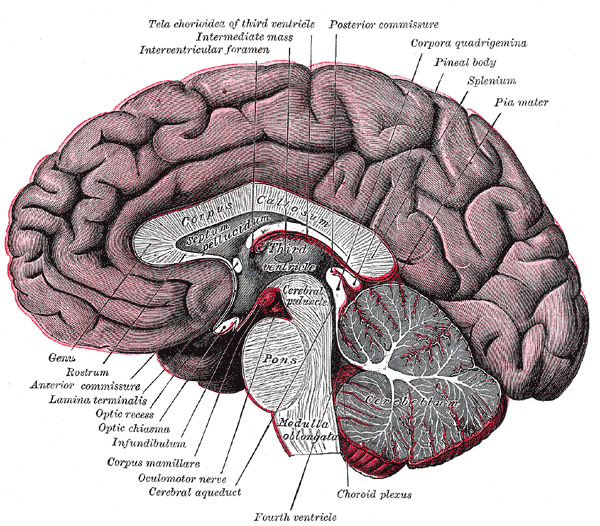
Median sagittal section of brain

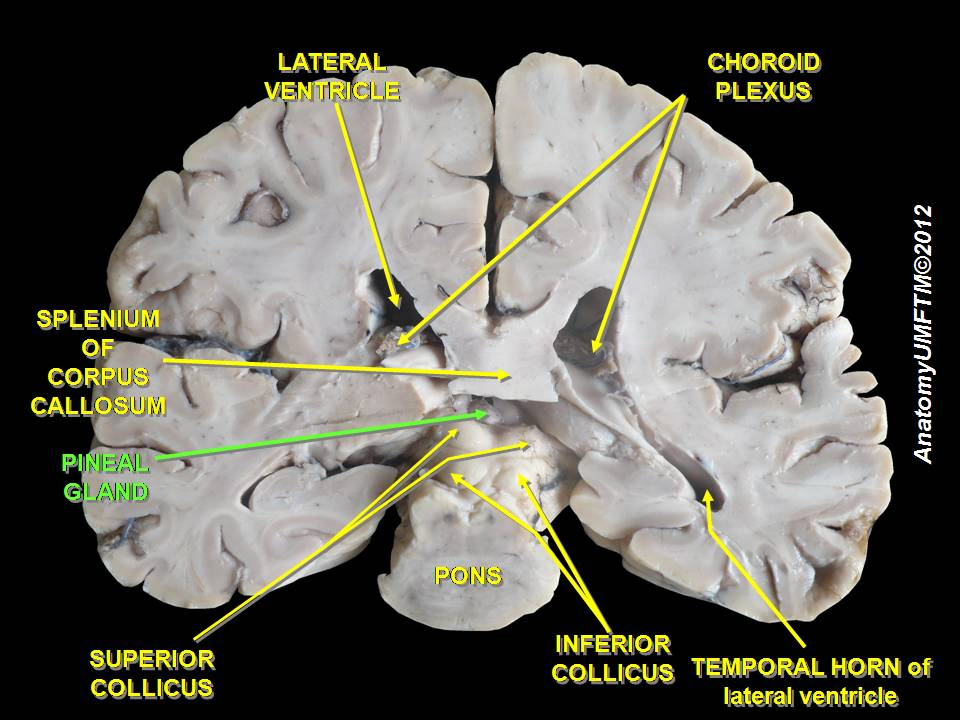
Pineal gland

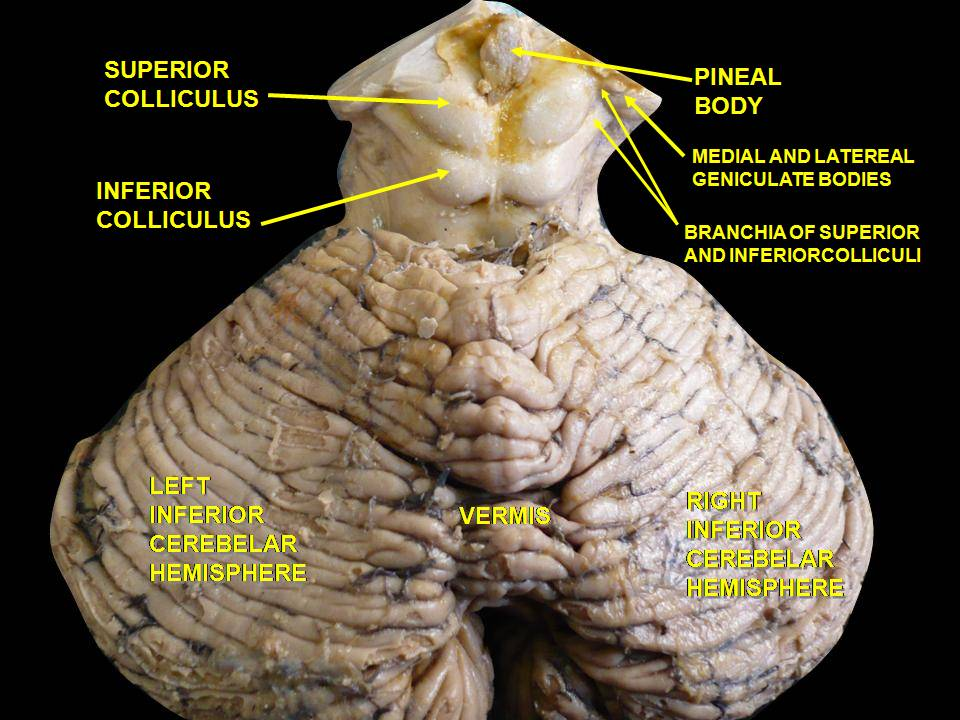
Brainstem; posterior view

== See also ==
- Pineal gland cyst
