= Pinealocyte =

Main cells contained in the pineal gland

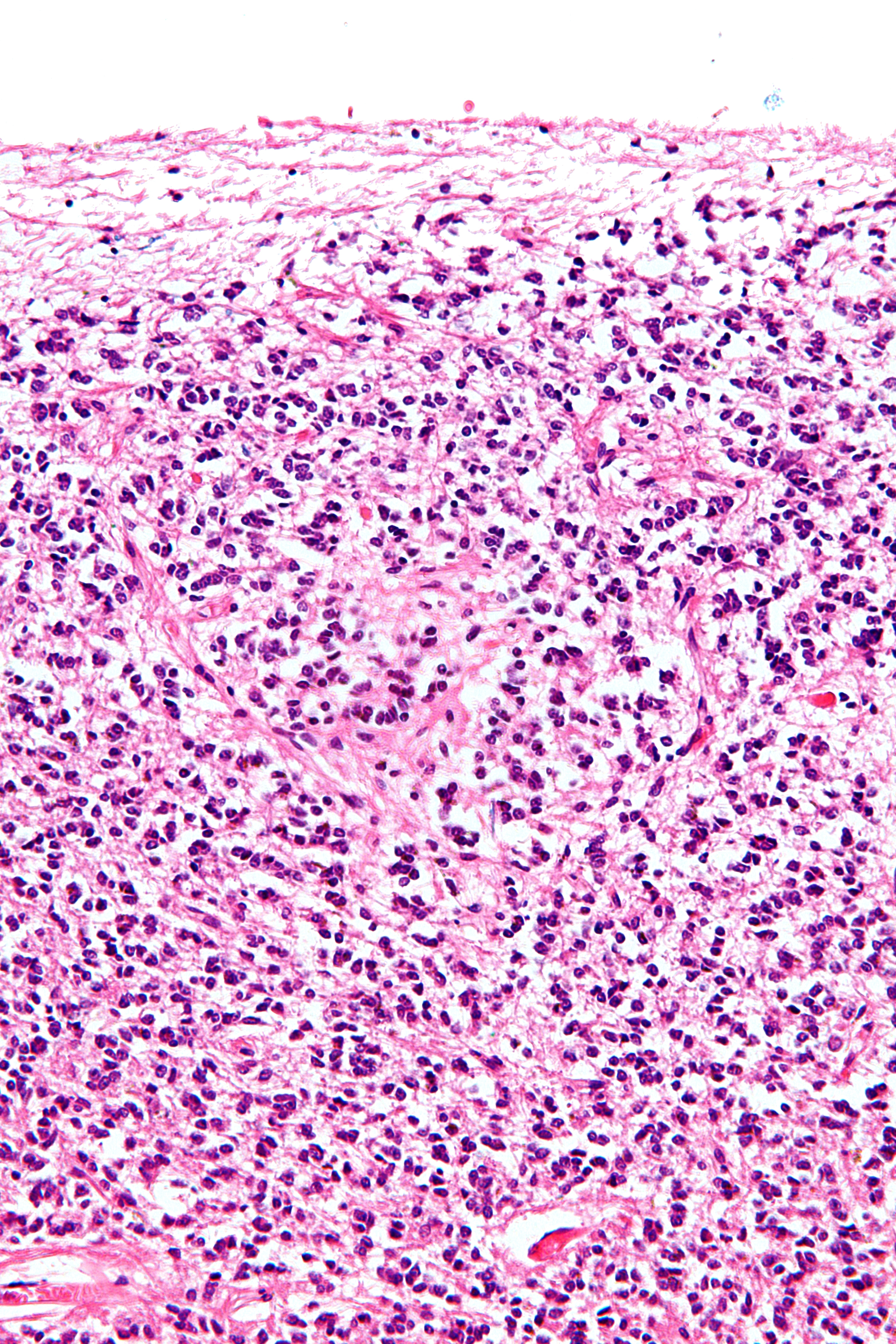
- Cross-section of pineal gland displaying pinealocytes and other cells

Details
- System: Endocrine system
- Location: Pineal gland

Identifiers
- Latin: pinealocytus, endocrinocitus pineale
- TH: H3.08.02.3.00002
- FMA: 83417

Pinealocytes are the main cells contained in the pineal gland, located behind the third ventricle and between the two hemispheres of the brain. The primary function of the pinealocytes is the secretion of the hormone melatonin, important in the regulation of circadian rhythms. In humans, the suprachiasmatic nucleus of the hypothalamus communicates the message of darkness to the pinealocytes, and as a result, controls the day and night cycle. It has been suggested that pinealocytes are derived from photoreceptor cells. Research has also shown the decline in the number of pinealocytes by way of apoptosis as the age of the organism increases. There are two different types of pinealocytes, type I and type II, which have been classified based on certain properties including shape, presence or absence of infolding of the nuclear envelope, and composition of the cytoplasm.

== Types of pinealocytes ==
=== Type 1 pinealocytes ===
Type 1 pinealocytes are also known as light pinealocytes because they stain at a low density when viewed under a light microscope and appear lighter to the human eye. These Type 1 cells have been identified through research to have a round or oval shape and a diameter ranging from 7–11 micrometers. Type 1 pinealocytes are typically more numerous in both children and adults than Type 2 pinealocytes. They are also considered to be the more active cell because of the presence of certain cellular contents, including a high concentration of mitochondria. Another finding consistent with Type 1 pinealocytes is the increase in the amount of lysosomes and dense granules present in the cells as the age of the organism increases, possibly indicating the importance of autophagocytosis in these cells. Research has also shown that Type 1 pinealocytes contain the neurotransmitter serotonin, which later is converted to melatonin, the main hormone secreted by the pineal gland.

=== Type 2 pinealocytes ===
Type 2 pinealocytes are also known as dark pinealocytes because they stain at a high density when viewed under a light microscope and appear darker to the human eye. As indicated by research and microscopy, they are round, oval, or elongated cells with a diameter of about 7–11.2 micrometers. The nucleus of a Type 2 pinealocyte contains many infoldings which contain large amounts of rough endoplasmic reticulum and ribosomes. An abundance of cilia and centrioles has also been found in these Type 2 cells of the pineal gland. Unique to the Type 2 is the presence of vacuoles containing 2 layers of membrane. As Type 1 cells contain serotonin, Type 2 cells contain melatonin and are thought to have similar characteristics as endocrine and neuronal cells.

== Synaptic ribbons ==
Synaptic ribbons are organelles seen in pinealocytes using electron microscopy. Synaptic ribbons are found in pinealocytes in both children and adults, but are not found in human fetuses. Research on rats has revealed more information about these organelles. The characteristic protein of synaptic ribbons is RIBEYE, as revealed by light and electron microscopy. In lower vertebrates, synaptic ribbons serve as a photoreceptive organ, but in upper vertebrates, they serve secretory functions within the cell. The presence of proteins such as Munc13-1 indicates that they are important in neurotransmitter release. At night, synaptic ribbons of rats appear larger and slightly curved, but during the day, they appear smaller and rod-like.

== Evolution of pinealocytes ==
A common theory on the evolution of pinealocytes is that they evolved from photoreceptor cells. It is speculated that in ancestral vertebrates, the pinealocytes served the same function as photoreceptor cells, such as retinal cells; in many non-mammalian vertebrates, pineal cells in the retina are still actively photoreceptive, although these cell do not contribute to a visual image. Structural, functional, and genetic similarities exist between the two cell types. Structurally, both develop from the area of the brain designated the diencephalon, also the area containing the thalamus and hypothalamus, during embryological development. Both types of cells have similar features, including cilia, folded membranes, and polarity. Functional evidence for this theory of evolution can be seen in non-mammalian vertebrates. The retention of photosensitivity of the pinealocytes of lampreys, fish, amphibians, reptiles, and birds and the secretion of melatonin by some of these lower vertebrates suggests that mammalian pinealocytes may have once served as photoreceptor cells. Researchers have also indicated the presence of several photoreceptor proteins found in the retina in the pinealocytes in chicken and fish. Genetic evidence demonstrates that phototransduction genes expressed in the photoreceptors of the retina are also present in pinealocytes.

More evidence for the evolution of pinealocytes from photoreceptor cells is the similarities between the ribbon complexes in the two types of cells. The presence of the protein RIBEYE and other proteins in both pinealocytes and sensory cells (both photoreceptors and hair cells) suggests that the two cells are related to one another evolutionarily. Differences between the two synaptic ribbons exist in the presence of certain proteins, such as ERC2/CAST1, and the distribution of proteins within the complexes of each cell.

== Melatonin ==
Structure of melatonin

=== Regulation ===
Regulation of melatonin synthesis is important to melatonin's main function in circadian rhythms. The main molecular control mechanism that exists for melatonin secretion in vertebrates is the enzyme AANAT (arylalkylamine N-acetyltransferase). The expression of the AANAT gene is controlled by the transcription factor pCREB, and this is evident when cells treated with epithalone, a peptide which affects pCREB transcription, have a resulting increase in melatonin synthesis. AANAT is activated through a protein kinase A system in which cyclic AMP (cAMP) is involved. The activation of AANAT leads to an increase in melatonin production. Though there are some differences specific to certain species of vertebrates, the effect of cAMP on AANAT and AANAT on melatonin synthesis remains fairly consistent.

Melatonin synthesis is also regulated by the nervous system. Nerve fibers in the retinohypothalamic tract connect the retina to the suprachiasmatic nucleus (SCN). The SCN stimulates the release of norepinephrine from sympathetic nerve fibers from the superior cervical ganglia that synapse with the pinealocytes. Norepinephrine causes the production of melatonin in the pinealocytes by stimulating the production of cAMP. Because the release of norepinephrine from the nerve fibers occurs at night, this system of regulation maintains the body's circadian rhythms.

=== Synthesis ===
Pinealocytes synthesize the hormone melatonin by first converting the amino acid tryptophan to serotonin. The serotonin is then acetylated by the AANAT enzyme and converted into N-acetylserotonin. N-acetylserotonin is converted into melatonin by the enzyme hydroxyindole O-methyltransferase (HIOMT), also known as acetylserotonin O-methyltransferase (ASMT). Activity of these enzymes is high during the night and regulated by the mechanisms previously discussed involving norepinephrine.

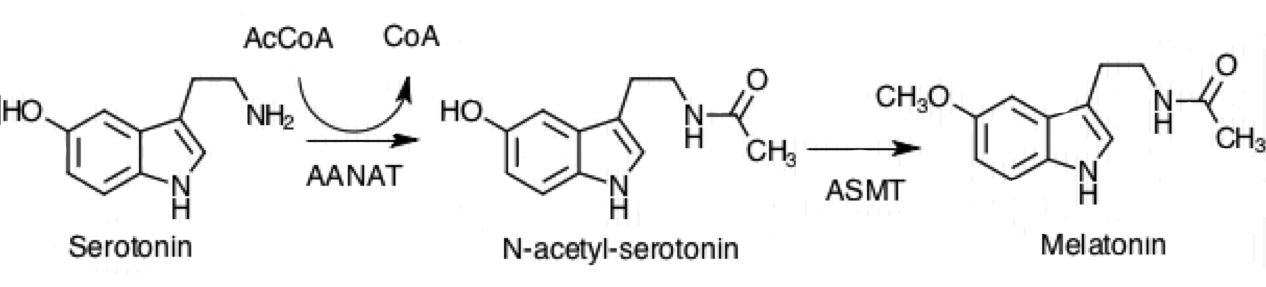
Synthesis of Melatonin

== See also ==
- List of human cell types derived from the germ layers
