= Pineocytoma =

Benign tumor of the pineal gland

- Other names: Pinealocytoma
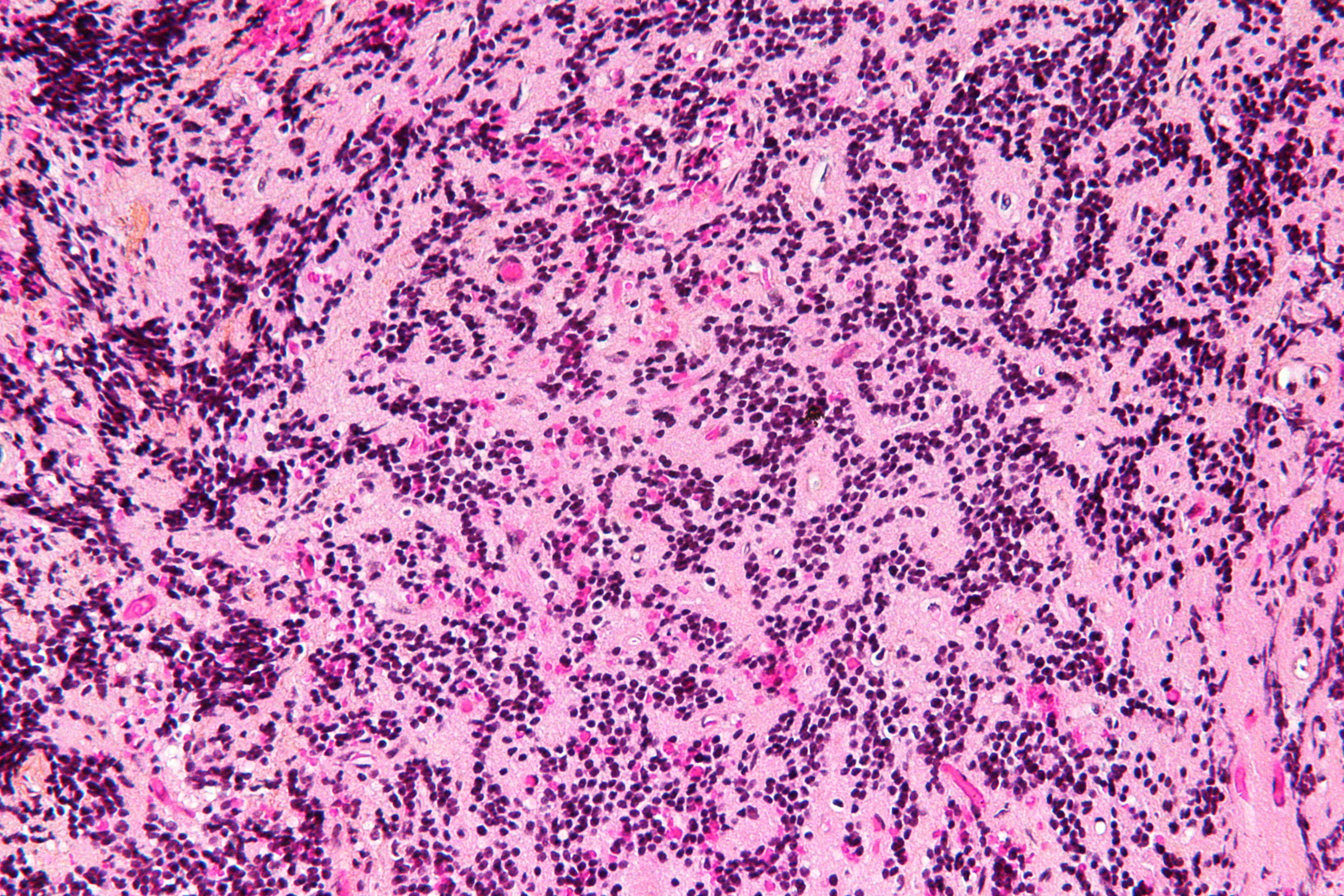
- Micrograph of a pineocytoma. HPS stain.
- Specialty: Oncology
- Symptoms: Parinaud syndrome, nausea, vision abnormalities, hydrocephalus, and headaches.
- Usual onset: 20-60 years of age.
- Diagnostic method: MRI and CT scan.
- Differential diagnosis: Pineoblastoma, pineal cyst, germ cell tumors, and metastasis.
- Treatment: Surgical excision.
- Prognosis: 86% 5-year survival rate.

Pineocytoma, is a rare, benign, slowly growing tumor of the pineal gland. The pineal gland is a small endocrine gland close to the center of the brain that secretes melatonin into the bloodstream. Pineocytomas can cause pressure and fluid build-up in the brain. They are more common in adults. Symptoms include vision problems, nausea, vomiting, memory problems, and headaches.

== Signs and symptoms ==
Because of their massive growth, pineocytoma symptoms are related to increased intracranial pressure. Some common symptoms of pineocytomas include Parinaud syndrome, headaches, dizziness, papilledema, tremors, ataxia, impaired vision, ambulation, ptosis, nausea, and vomiting.

== Causes ==
The true cause of pineocytomas is unknown. No genetic mutations have been linked to pineocytomas however, there have been some associations with certain chromosomal abnormalities. There are no known risk factors for pineocytomas.

== Diagnosis ==
Pineocytomas typically present on a CT scan as round and well-delineated masses with a diameter under 3cm. Pineocytomas are homogeneous, hypodense, and sometimes have central or peripheral calcification. On an MRI a pineocytoma often appears isointense or hypointense in T1-weighted scans. However, they usually appear hyperintense on T2-weighted scans. The diagnosis of a pineocytoma is confirmed by a brain biopsy.

== Management ==
The main treatment options for pineocytomas are gross total resection, subtotal resection, and radiation.

== See also ==
- Pineal gland
