= Pineal gland cyst =

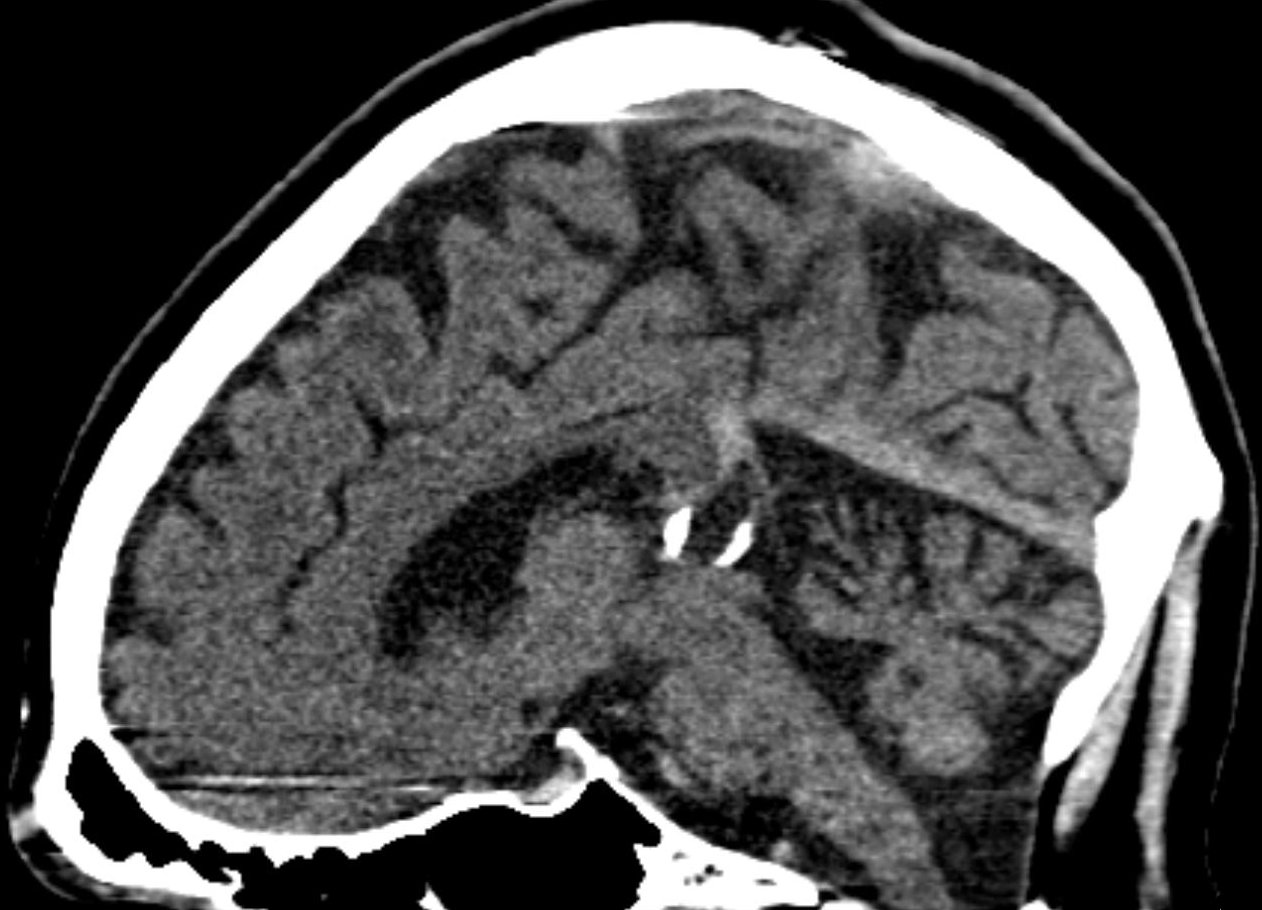
- Calcified cyst of pineal gland in CT. Sagittal MPR.

A pineal gland cyst is a usually benign (non-malignant) cyst in the pineal gland, a small endocrine gland in the brain. Historically, these fluid-filled bodies appeared on 1-4% of magnetic resonance imaging (MRI) brain scans, but were more frequently diagnosed at death, seen in 4-11% of autopsies. A 2007 study by Pu et al. found a frequency of 23% in brain scans (with a mean diameter of 4.3 mm).

The National Organization for Rare Disorders states that pineal cysts larger than 5.0 mm are "rare findings" and are possibly symptomatic. If narrowing of the cerebral aqueduct occurs, many neurological symptoms may exist, including headaches, vertigo, nausea, muscle fasciculations, eye sensitivity, and ataxia. Continued monitoring of the cyst might be recommended to monitor its growth, and surgery may be necessary.

== Treatment ==
Rhomberg, T., & Schroeder, H. W. (2024). Microsurgical Resection of a Pineal Cyst via a Paramedian Supracerebellar Infratentorial Approach. World Neurosurgery, 185, 113. https://doi.org/10.1016/j.wneu.2024.02.049

Pineal gland cysts typically require treatment only if they are symptomatic. They can be removed either endoscopically or through a conventional open approach, such as a supracerebellar infratentorial approach.

== Additional images ==
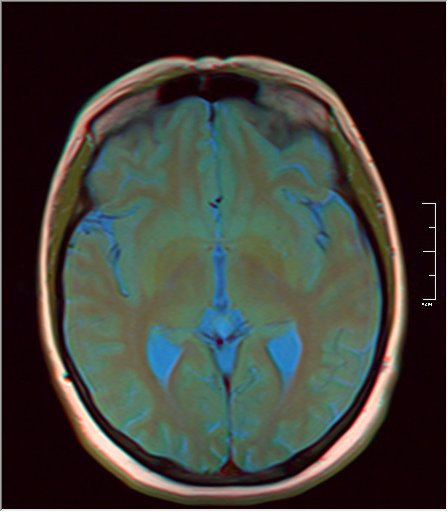
MRI axial in false color

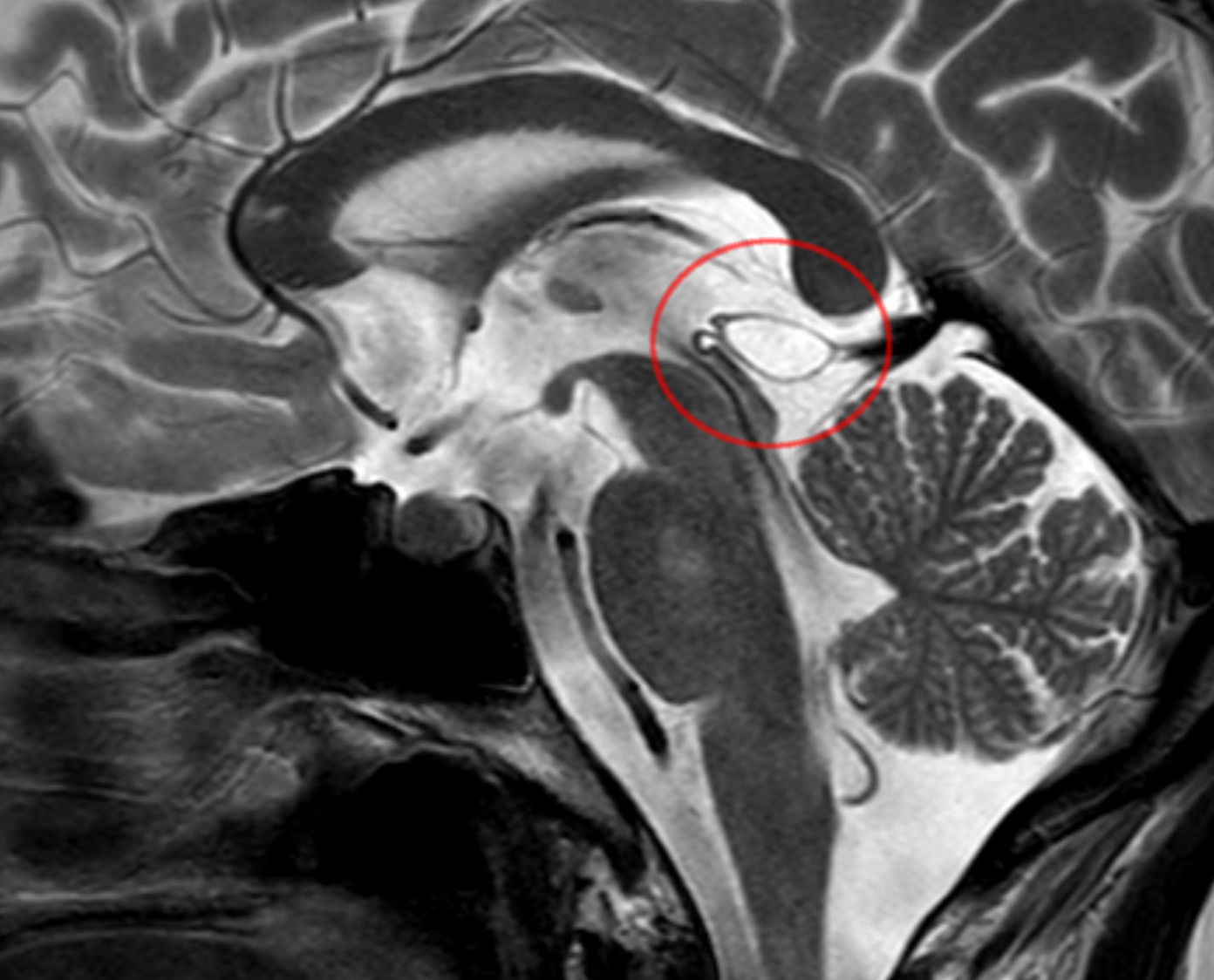
Another case: sagittal
