= Neurotransmitter prodrug =

Type of medication

Levodopa (L-DOPA), a prodrug of dopamine which is used to treat Parkinson's disease and certain other conditions.

A neurotransmitter prodrug, or neurotransmitter precursor, is a drug that acts as a prodrug of a neurotransmitter. A variety of neurotransmitter prodrugs have been developed and used in medicine. They can be useful when the neurotransmitter itself is not suitable for use as a pharmaceutical drug owing to unfavorable pharmacokinetic or physicochemical properties, for instance high susceptibility to metabolism, short elimination half-life, or lack of blood–brain barrier permeability. Besides their use in medicine, neurotransmitter prodrugs have also been used as recreational drugs in some cases.

== Monoamine prodrugs ==
Monoamine neurotransmitter prodrugs include the catecholamine precursors and prodrugs L-phenylalanine, L-tyrosine, L-DOPA (levodopa), L-DOPS (droxidopa), dipivefrine (O,O'-dipivalylepinephrine), and dibutepinephrine, as well as the serotonin and melatonin precursors and prodrugs L-tryptophan and L-5-hydroxytryptophan (5-HTP; oxitriptan). Other dopamine prodrugs, including etilevodopa, foslevodopa, melevodopa, XP-21279, DopAmide, DA-Phen, O,O'-diacetyldopamine, O,O'-dipivaloyldopamine, docarpamine, gludopa, and gludopamine, have also been developed. Dopamantine (N-adamantanoyl dopamine) is another possible attempt at a dopamine prodrug. Other serotonin prodrugs have been developed as well, such as the renally-selective L-glutamyl-5-hydroxy-L-tryptophan (glu-5-HTP).

5-HTP is additionally a prodrug of N-methylated tryptamine psychedelic trace amines, such as N-methylserotonin (NMS; norbufotenin) and bufotenin (5-hydroxy-N,N-dimethyltryptamine; 5-HO-DMT). The same is also true of L-tryptophan, which is transformed into tryptamine as well as into N-methyltryptamine (NMT) and N,N-dimethyltryptamine (N,N-DMT). Dependent on these transformations, both tryptophan and 5-HTP produce the head-twitch response (HTR), a behavioral proxy of psychedelic effects, at sufficiently high doses in animals. O-Acetylbufotenine and O-pivalylbufotenine are thought to be centrally active prodrugs of the peripherally selective bufotenin.

Although they are not endogenous neurotransmitter prodrugs, "false" or "substitute" neurotransmitter prodrugs, such as α-methyltryptophan and α-methyl-5-hydroxytryptophan (which are prodrugs of α-methylserotonin, a substitute neurotransmitter of serotonin), have also been developed. Analogously, ibopamine and fosopamine are prodrugs of epinine (N-methyldopamine; deoxyepinephrine).

== GABA prodrugs ==
γ-Aminobutyric acid (GABA) prodrugs include progabide and tolgabide. Picamilon (N-nicotinoyl-GABA) has been claimed to be a prodrug of GABA, but has not actually been demonstrated to be converted into GABA. N-Benzoyl-GABA is of very similar chemical structure as picamilon and has also been claimed to be a prodrug of GABA, but this remains unclear similarly. Pivagabine (N-pivaloyl-GABA) was once thought to be a prodrug of GABA, but this proved not to be the case. Cetyl-GABA (GABA cetyl ester) is another prodrug of GABA.

4-Amino-1-butanol is known to be converted into GABA through the actions of aldehyde reductase (ALR) and aldehyde dehydrogenase (ALDH). 4-Amino-1-butanol is to GABA as 1,4-butanediol (4-hydroxy-1-butanol; 1,4-BD) is to γ-hydroxybutyric acid (GHB) (with 1,4-BD being a well-known prodrug of GHB). The metabolic intermediate γ-aminobutyraldehyde (GABAL) is also converted into GABA.

== GHB prodrugs ==
A number of γ-hydroxybutyric acid (GHB) prodrugs are known. These include 1,4-butanediol (1,4-BD) and γ-butyrolactone (GBL), as well as the metabolic intermediate γ-hydroxybutyraldehyde (GHBAL).

== Acetylcholine prodrugs ==
Acetylcholine precursors and prodrugs like choline, phosphatidylcholine (lecithin), citicoline (CDP-choline), and choline alphoscerate (α-GPC) are known and have been researched.
