= Α-Methyl-5-hydroxytryptophan =

Monoaminergic agent

α-Methyl-5-HTP

Clinical data
- Other names: alpha-Methyl-5-hydroxytryptophan; alpha-Methyl-L-5-hydroxytryptophan; α-Me-5-HTP; α-Methyl-5-HTP; αM-5-HTP; alpha-Me-5-HTP; alpha-Methyl-5-HTP
- Drug class: Tyrosine hydroxylase inhibitor; Serotonin receptor agonist

Identifiers
- IUPAC name: (2S)-2-amino-3-(5-hydroxy-1H-indol-3-yl)-2-methylpropanoic acid
- CAS Number: 150852-19-0
- PubChem CID: 6453138
- ChemSpider: 4955531
- CompTox Dashboard (EPA): DTXSID70970468

Chemical and physical data
- Formula: C_{12}H_{14}N_{2}O_{3}
- Molar mass: 234.255 g·mol^{−1}
- 3D model (JSmol): Interactive image
- SMILES: C[C@](CC1=CNC2=C1C=C(C=C2)O)(C(=O)O)N
- InChI: InChI=1S/C12H14N2O3/c1-12(13,11(16)17)5-7-6-14-10-3-2-8(15)4-9(7)10/h2-4,6,14-15H,5,13H2,1H3,(H,16,17)/t12-/m0/s1; Key:QNQKTYDMWUGLPA-LBPRGKRZSA-N

α-Methyl-5-hydroxytryptophan (α-Me-5-HTP) is a synthetic tryptamine derivative, an artificial amino acid, and a prodrug of α-methylserotonin. It is the α-methylated derivative of 5-hydroxytryptophan (5-HTP), while αMS is the α-methylated analogue of serotonin. Along with α-methyltryptophan (α-MTP), α-Me-5-HTP has been suggested for potential therapeutic use in the treatment of conditions thought by some authors to be related to serotonin deficiency, such as depression.

αMS is a non-selective serotonin receptor agonist, including of the serotonin 5-HT_{2} receptors, and has been described as a "substitute neurotransmitter" of serotonin. However, whereas αMS itself is too hydrophilic to efficiently cross the blood–brain barrier, thus being peripherally selective, α-MTP and α-Me-5-HTP are able to cross the blood–brain barrier and, following transformation, deliver αMS into the brain. Besides αMS, α-methylmelatonin can be formed in small amounts from α-Me-5-HTP.

In addition to their serotonergic activity, α-Me-5-HTP and αMS have been found to act as norepinephrine releasing agents similarly to α-methylphenylalanine and to other α-alkylated tryptamines. Moreover, α-Me-5-HTP is also a tyrosine hydroxylase inhibitor similarly to α-methyltyrosine, as well as an aromatic L-amino acid decarboxylase (AAAD) inhibitor, and has been found to deplete levels of brain norepinephrine in animals, although not levels of brain dopamine. Because of these actions, α-Me-5-HTP shows antihypertensive effects and reduces locomotor activity in animals.

== See also ==
- O-Acetylbufotenine (O-acetyl-N,N-dimethylserotonin)
- α-Methylphenylalanine
- α-Methyl-p-tyrosine (α-methyltyrosine)
- Methyldopa (α-methyl-DOPA)
- Neurotransmitter prodrug
