= DopAmide =

Dopaminergic agent

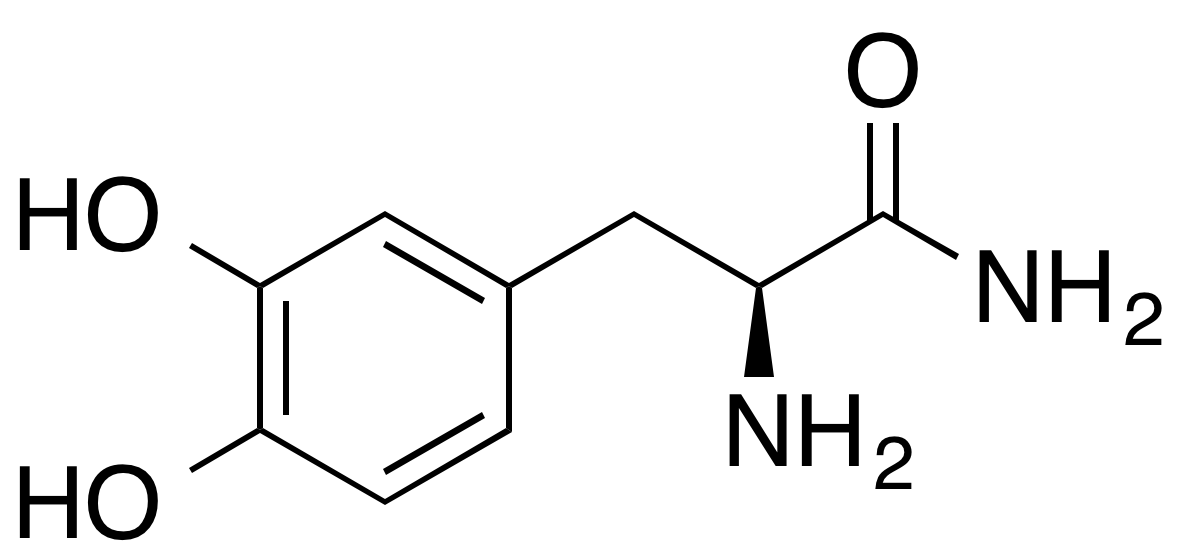

Clinical data
- Other names: L-DopAmide; 3-Hydroxytyrosinamide
- Drug class: Monoamine precursor; Dopamine receptor agonist

Identifiers
- IUPAC name: 2-amino-3-(3,4-dihydroxyphenyl)propanamide
- CAS Number: 73148-96-6
- PubChem CID: 424633
- ChemSpider: 375743

Chemical and physical data
- Formula: C_{9}H_{12}N_{2}O_{3}
- Molar mass: 196.206 g·mol^{−1}
- 3D model (JSmol): Interactive image
- SMILES: C1=CC(=C(C=C1CC(C(=O)N)N)O)O
- InChI: InChI=1S/C9H12N2O3/c10-6(9(11)14)3-5-1-2-7(12)8(13)4-5/h1-2,4,6,12-13H,3,10H2,(H2,11,14); Key:DXOJUCNAHCVBRU-UHFFFAOYSA-N

DopAmide, or L-DopAmide, is a synthetic levodopa (L-DOPA) analogue that can serve as a levodopa and dopamine prodrug and is of potential interest in the treatment of Parkinson's disease. DopAmide has an amide rather than the carboxyl group of L-DOPA, which imparts greater water solubility. The amide is hydrolyzed back to the acid by aminopeptidase enzymes.

== See also ==
- DA-Phen
- Foslevodopa
- Melevodopa
- Etilevodopa
- O,O′-Diacetyldopamine
- O,O′-Dipivaloyldopamine
- Neurotransmitter prodrug
