= Kopin =

Kopin may refer to:

- Kopin Corporation, United States electronics manufacturer
- Kopin, Myaung, village in Myaung Township, Sagaing District, Sagaing Division, Myanmar
- Mascot of the Luminous Arc video game series
- Fictional currency in the Groo the Wanderer American comic book series

People with the surname Kopin or Kopins include:

- Irwin Kopin (1929–2017), American biochemist
- Karen Kopins (born 1961), American actress
- Roman Kopin (born 1974), governor of Chukotka, Russia

People with the given name Kopin include:

- Kopin Liu (born 1949), Taiwanese physical chemist
