= Α-Methylmelatonin =

Melatonin analogue

α-Methylmelatonin

Clinical data
- Other names: α-Methyl-5-methoxy-N-acetyltryptamine; α-Methyl-N-acetyl-5-methoxytryptamine

Identifiers
- CAS Number: 1869951-45-0

Chemical and physical data
- Formula: C_{14}H_{18}N_{2}O_{2}
- Molar mass: 246.310 g·mol^{−1}
- 3D model (JSmol): Interactive image
- SMILES: O(C)C1C=CC2=C(C=1)C(=CN2[H])CC(C)N([H])C(C)=O
- InChI: InChI=1S/C14H18N2O2/c1-9(16-10(2)17)6-11-8-15-14-5-4-12(18-3)7-13(11)14/h4-5,7-9,15H,6H2,1-3H3,(H,16,17); Key:KEFHUIZLNNJKEM-UHFFFAOYSA-N

α-Methylmelatonin, also known as α-methyl-5-methoxy-N-acetyltryptamine, is a synthetic tryptamine derivative and analogue of the monoamine neurotransmitter melatonin. It is a metabolite of α-methyltryptophan, α-methyl-5-hydroxytryptophan, and α-methylserotonin that can be formed in small amounts via aralkylamine N-acetyltransferase (AANAT). α-Methyltryptophan and α-methyl-5-hydroxytryptophan are prodrugs of α-methylserotonin that have serotonergic actions and have been suggested for potential therapeutic use. However, while formation of α-methylmelatonin can occur from these compounds, α-alkylated tryptamines show 95% reduced suitability as substrates for AANAT compared to non-α-alkylated tryptamines in vitro and no α-methylmelatonin could be detected with administration of α-methyltryptophan in vivo in animals. α-Methyl-N-acetylserotonin is an intermediate is the formation of α-methylmelatonin from α-methylserotonin.

== See also ==
- Substituted tryptamine
