= O-Pivalylbufotenine =

Psychedelic drug

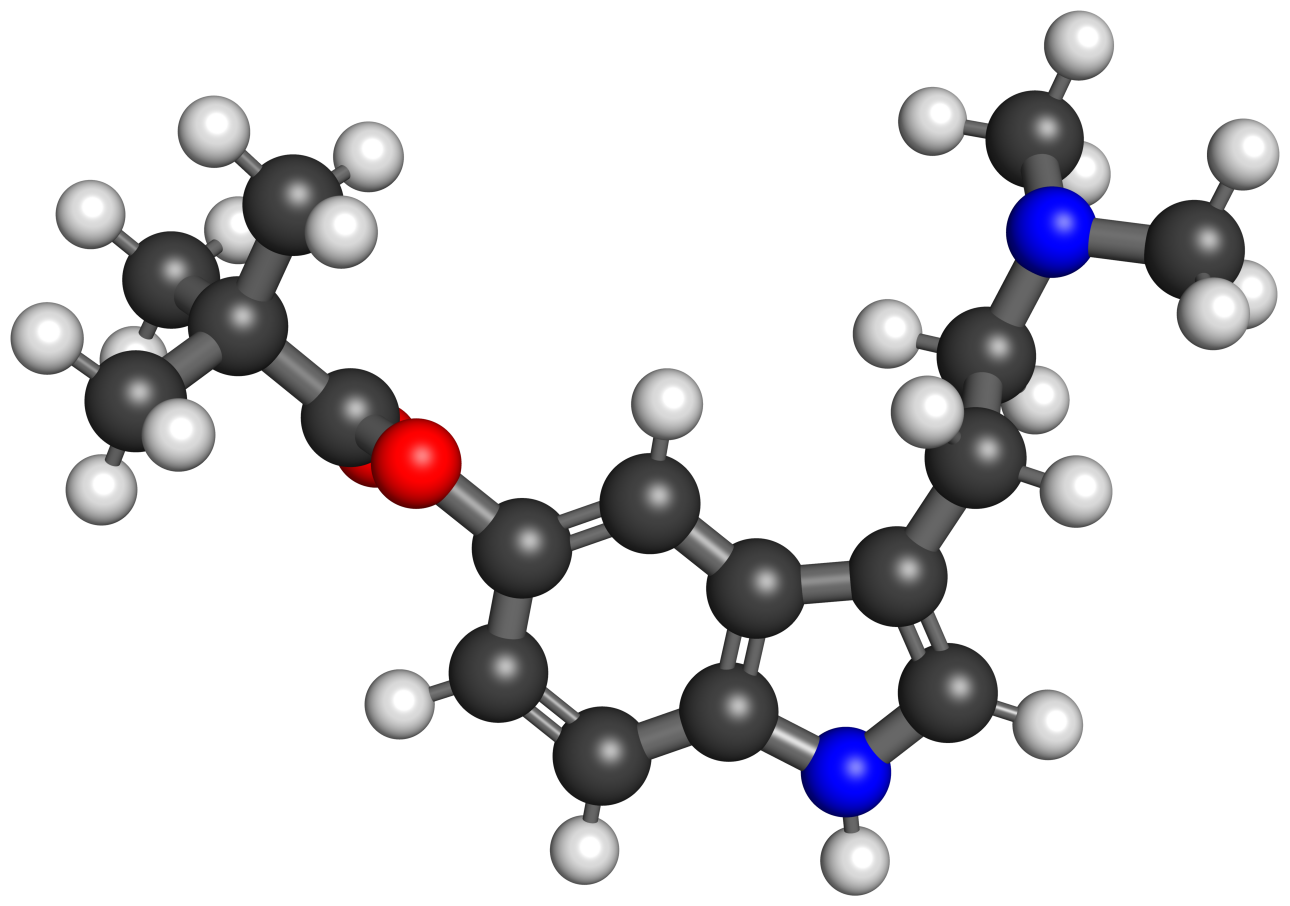

Clinical data
- Other names: 5-Pivalylbufotenine; 5-PB; Bufotenine O-pivalate; Bufotenine pivalate; 5-Pivaloxy-N,N-dimethyltryptamine; O-Pivalyl-N,N-dimethylserotonin; 5-t-BuCO-DMT; 5-(tert-BuCO)-DMT
- Drug class: Serotonin receptor agonist; Serotonergic psychedelic
- ATC code: None

Identifiers
- IUPAC name: [3-[2-(dimethylamino)ethyl]-1H-indol-5-yl] 2,2-dimethylpropanoate
- PubChem CID: 44339071
- ChemSpider: 23195001
- ChEMBL: ChEMBL109360

Chemical and physical data
- Formula: C_{17}H_{24}N_{2}O_{2}
- Molar mass: 288.391 g·mol^{−1}
- 3D model (JSmol): Interactive image
- SMILES: CC(C)(C)C(=O)OC1=CC2=C(C=C1)NC=C2CCN(C)C
- InChI: InChI=1S/C17H24N2O2/c1-17(2,3)16(20)21-13-6-7-15-14(10-13)12(11-18-15)8-9-19(4)5/h6-7,10-11,18H,8-9H2,1-5H3; Key:AFACMZRKVDGTKP-UHFFFAOYSA-N

O-Pivalylbufotenine, or bufotenine O-pivalate, also known as 5-pivaloxy-N,N-dimethyltryptamine (5-t-BuCO-DMT) or as O-pivalyl-N,N-dimethylserotonin, is a synthetic tryptamine derivative and putative serotonergic psychedelic. It is the O-pivalyl analogue of the naturally occurring but peripherally selective serotonergic tryptamine bufotenine (5-hydroxy-N,N-dimethyltrypamine or N,N-dimethylserotonin) and is thought to act as a centrally penetrant prodrug of bufotenine.

== Pharmacology ==
O-Pivalylbufotenine is thought to be a prodrug of bufotenin and shows psychedelic-like effects in animal. However, it is less active than anticipated, perhaps due to its high lipophilicity and, by extension, high plasma protein binding and ester hydrolysis into bufotenin prior to crossing the blood–brain barrier. In addition to theoretically acting as a prodrug of bufotenine, which is a non-selective serotonin receptor agonist, O-pivalylbufotenine may also interact directly with certain serotonin receptors.

== Chemistry ==
=== Analogues ===
Analogues of O-pivalylbufotenine (5-t-BuCO-DMT) include bufotenin (5-HO-DMT), 5-MeO-DMT (mebufotenin), and 4-AcO-DMT (psilacetin), among others. In addition, besides O-pivalylbufotenine, other bufotenine O-acyl esters and putative or confirmed bufotenine prodrugs, such as O-acetylbufotenine among others, have been developed and studied.

== History ==
O-Pivalylbufotenine was first described in the scientific literature by 1979.

== See also ==
- Substituted tryptamine
- O,O′-Diacetyldopamine
- O,O′-Dipivaloyldopamine
- α-Methyltryptophan
- Neurotransmitter prodrug
- Psilacetin
