= N1-Acetyl-5-methoxykynuramine =

Metabolite of melatonin

Names
- IUPAC name N-[3-(2-Amino-5-methoxyphenyl)-3-oxopropyl]acetamide

Identifiers
| CAS Number | 52450-39-2 |
| 3D model (JSmol) | Interactive image |
| ChEBI | CHEBI:173696 |
| ChEMBL | ChEMBL369941 |
| ChemSpider | 346276 |
| PubChem CID | 390658 |
| UNII | YY9B6V6WK3 |
| CompTox Dashboard (EPA) | DTXSID10966880 |
- InChI: InChI=1S/C12H16N2O3/c1-8(15)14-6-5-12(16)10-7-9(17-2)3-4-11(10)13/h3-4,7H,5-6,13H2,1-2H3,(H,14,15) Key: RJQIZOKNUKRKTP-UHFFFAOYSA-N
- SMILES: CC(=O)NCCC(=O)C1=C(C=CC(=C1)OC)N

Properties
| Chemical formula | C_{12}H_{16}N_{2}O_{3} |
| Molar mass | 236.271 g·mol^{−1} |
- Except where otherwise noted, data are given for materials in their standard state (at 25 °C [77 °F], 100 kPa). Infobox references

N1-Acetyl-5-methoxykynuramine (AMK) is a metabolite of melatonin that could improve memory by acting on the melatonin receptors. AMK is produced from the metabolization of melatonin by the kynuramine pathway in the brain. It significantly increased the phosphorylation of both ERK and CREB in the hippocampus. It also helps scavenge free radicals. AMK is highly reactive towards dioxygen (O_{2}) radicals because of AMK's N^{2-}amino group.

== Anti-inflammatory activity ==
Studies have shown that melatonin, along with its metabolites N^{1}-acetyl-N^{2}-formyl-5-methoxykynuramine (AFMK) and N1-acetyl-5-methoxykynuramine (AMK), can suppress the activation of cyclooxygenase-2 (COX-2) and inducible nitric oxide synthase(iNOS). This leads to reduced production of prostaglandin E_{2} (PGE_{2}) and nitric oxide, respectively. COX-2 is a key enzyme involved in inflammation and its activation is triggered by lipopolysaccharide (LPS) in macrophages. Elevated levels of COX-2 expression have been linked to various disorders, such as cancer and neurodegeneration. COX-2 and iNOS are identified as newly recognized molecular targets and this supports the possible therapeutic role of melatonin, AFMK, and AMK in managing inflammatory responses.

== Antiproliferative effects in the human epidermis ==
AMK is naturally synthesized in the human skin and its concentration varies depending on the degree of melanin pigmentation. It has been shown to reduce cell proliferation in keratinocytes and cancerous melanocytes. When epidermal melanocytes and melanoma cells were cultured with AMK, a decrease in cell count was observed compared to cells exposed only to the control treatment. Studies have shown that these antiproliferative effects were maintained even when AMK is administered in the presence of L-tyrosine.
