= O-Acetylbufotenine =

Psychedelic tryptamine

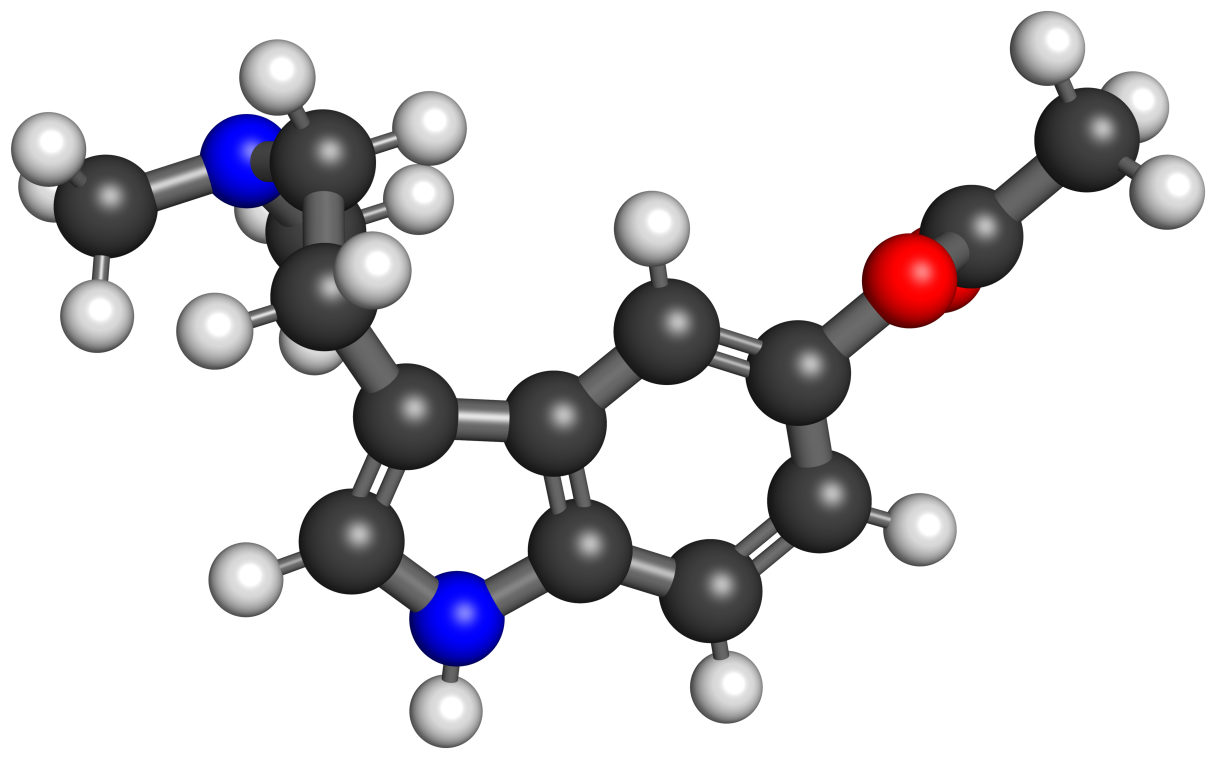

Clinical data
- Other names: O-Acetylbufotenin; Bufotenine acetate; Bufotenin acetate; Bufotenine O-acetate; Bufotenin O-acetate; 5-Acetoxy-N,N-dimethyltryptamine; 5-Acetoxy-DMT; 5-AcO-DMT; 5-Acetoxy-N,N-DMT; O-Acetyl-N,N-dimethylserotonin
- Drug class: Serotonin receptor agonist; Serotonergic psychedelic
- ATC code: None

Identifiers
- IUPAC name: [3-[2-(dimethylamino)ethyl]-1H-indol-5-yl] acetate
- CAS Number: 16977-50-7
- PubChem CID: 15480709
- ChemSpider: 23194786
- ChEMBL: ChEMBL111000
- CompTox Dashboard (EPA): DTXSID701345666

Chemical and physical data
- Formula: C_{14}H_{18}N_{2}O_{2}
- Molar mass: 246.310 g·mol^{−1}
- 3D model (JSmol): Interactive image
- SMILES: CC(=O)OC1=CC2=C(C=C1)NC=C2CCN(C)C
- InChI: InChI=1S/C14H18N2O2/c1-10(17)18-12-4-5-14-13(8-12)11(9-15-14)6-7-16(2)3/h4-5,8-9,15H,6-7H2,1-3H3; Key:BZFGYTBVFYYKOK-UHFFFAOYSA-N

O-Acetylbufotenine, or bufotenine O-acetate, also known as 5-acetoxy-N,N-dimethyltryptamine (5-AcO-DMT) or O-acetyl-N,N-dimethylserotonin, is a synthetic tryptamine derivative and putative serotonergic psychedelic. It is the O-acetylated analogue of the naturally occurring peripherally selective serotonergic tryptamine bufotenine (5-hydroxy-N,N-dimethyltrypamine or N,N-dimethylserotonin) and is thought to act as a centrally penetrant prodrug of bufotenine.

== Use and effects ==
The effects of O-acetylbufotenine in humans have not been assessed or reported. Alexander Shulgin speculated about O-acetylbufotenine in his 1997 book TiHKAL (Tryptamines I Have Known and Loved), but did not personally synthesize or test it.

== Pharmacology ==
Bufotenin has low lipophilicity, limitedly crosses the blood–brain barrier in animals, does not produce psychedelic-like effects in animals except at very high doses or administered directly into the brain, and produces inconsistent and weak psychedelic effects accompanied by pronounced peripheral side effects in humans. O-Acetylbufotenine, which is much more lipophilic than bufotenine due to its acetyl group, was developed in an attempt to overcome bufotenine's limitations and allow for the drug to efficiently cross the blood–brain barrier. In contrast to peripherally administered bufotenine, O-acetylbufotenine readily enters the brain in animals and produces robust psychedelic-like effects. In addition, O-acetylbufotenine was more potent than dimethyltryptamine (DMT) or 5-methoxy-N,N-dimethyltryptamine (5-MeO-DMT; O-methylbufotenine) in animals.

O-Acetylbufotenine is thought to be a prodrug of bufotenine, which is a non-selective agonist of many of the serotonin receptors, including of the serotonin 5-HT_{2A} receptor (the activation of which is associated with psychedelic effects). However, O-acetylbufotenine has also unexpectedly been found to act directly as an agonist of certain serotonin receptors, including of the serotonin 5-HT_{1A} and 5-HT_{1D} receptors.

The O-acetyl substitution of O-acetylbufotenine is expected to be cleaved quite rapidly in vivo, which may hinder the ability of O-acetylbufotenine to cross the blood–brain barrier and deliver bufotenine into the central nervous system. This might be overcome with other O-acyl bufotenin derivatives.

== Chemistry ==
=== Analogues ===
Analogues of O-acetylbufotenin (5-AcO-DMT) include bufotenin (5-HO-DMT), 4-AcO-DMT (psilacetin), 5-MeO-DMT, 5-EtO-DMT, 5-HO-DET, 5-HO-DPT, 5-HO-DiPT, and α-methylserotonin (5-HO-AMT), among others. In addition, other O-acyl derivatives of bufotenin besides O-acetylbufotenine have been developed and studied. One such analogue, O-pivalylbufotenine, has been assessed and has likewise been shown to produce psychedelic-like effects animals.

== History ==
O-Acetylbufotenine was first described in the scientific literature by 1968. It was sold online as an analytical standard by 2023.

== Society and culture ==
=== Legal status ===
==== Canada ====
O-Acetylbufotenine is not an explicitly nor implicitly controlled substance in Canada as of 2025.

==== United States ====
O-Acetylbufotenine is not an explicitly controlled substance in the United States. However, it could be considered a controlled substance under the Federal Analogue Act if intended for human consumption.

== See also ==
- Substituted tryptamine
- O,O′-Diacetyldopamine
- O,O′-Dipivaloyldopamine
- α-Methyltryptophan
- Neurotransmitter prodrug
