= C13H16N2O4 =

The molecular formula C_{13}H_{16}N_{2}O_{4} may refer to:

- N^{1}-Acetyl-N^{2}-formyl-5-methoxykynuramine
- Phenylacetylglutamine
