= History of the pineal gland =

Aspect of medical history

Location of pineal gland (red) in human brain

The history of the pineal gland is an account of the scientific development on the understanding of the pineal gland from the ancient Greeks that led to the discovery of its neuroendocrine properties in the 20th century CE. As an elusive and unique part of the brain, the pineal gland has the longest history among the body organs as a structure of unknown function – it took almost two millennia to discover its biological roles. Until the 20th century, it was recognised with a mixture of mysticism and scientific conjectures as to its possible nature.

The ancient Greeks visualised the pineal gland as a sort of guard (valve), like the pylorus of stomach, that regulate the flow of pneuma (vital spirits) in the brain. Galen of Pergamum in the 2nd century CE was the first to make written record of the gland and argued against the prevailing concept. According to him, the gland has no spiritual or physiological role, but merely a supporting organ of the brain, and gave the name κωνάριο (konario, often Latinised as conarium) for its cone-shaped appearance. Galen's description remained a scientific concept until the Renaissance when alternative explanations were postulated. By then, the Latin name glandula pinealis had become a common usage. René Descartes's description as the "seat of the soul" in the 17th century became one of the most influential concepts for the next three centuries.

The biological role of the pineal gland was first discovered in 1958 when dermatologist Aaron B. Lerner and colleagues discovered a skin-lightening factor, which they named melatonin. Lerner's team found the chemical compound from the cow pineal extract that could lightens the skin of frog. It was subsequently discovered that melatonin is a hormone that regulates day-night cycle (circadian rhythm), and modulates other organs. The pineal gland thereby was established as an endocrine gland. As it controls the other important endocrine glands—including the so-called "master gland", the pituitary gland—it is more appropriate to refer the pineal gland as the true "master gland" of the body.

== Etymology ==
The English term "pineal" was first used in the 1680s, originating from the Middle French pinéal, which is from Latin pinea (conifer cone) in reference to the gland's similar shape. The noun "gland" is derived from the Old French word glandre, meaning "gland", derived from the Latin glandula, as in the shape of an acorn.

== Ancient Greeks ==
Greek physician Galen was the first to give written description about the pineal gland in the 2nd century CE. He indicated that the structure as a part of the brain was already known to earlier Greek scholars, crediting Herophilus (325–280 BCE) as the first to have described the possible role of the gland. Herophilus had explained that the structure was a kind of valve, like the pylorus of stomach that controls the amount of food particles moving into the intestine. As a valve in the brain, the structure guards the brain chambers and maintains the right amount of the flow of vital spirits called pneuma. It was conceived as a guardian or housekeeper that regulates the movement of vital spirits from the middle (now identified to be the third) ventricle to the one in the parencephalis (fourth ventricle). The idea was generally endorsed by other Greek scholars.

Galen made the description of the pineal gland in his two books De usu partium corporis humani, libri VII (On the Usefulness of Parts of the Body, Part 8) and De anatomicis administrationibus, libri IX (On Anatomical Procedures, Part 9). In De usu partium corporis humani, he gave the name κωνάριο (konario, often Latinised as conarium) meaning a cone, as in pinecone. He correctly identified the structure and the position of the gland as directly lying behind the third ventricle. He opposed the prevailing concept originated by Herophilus and instead upheld that the organ could not be a brain valve for two basic reasons: it is located outside of the brain tissue and it does not move on its own.

Galen did believe that the brain has a valve for movements of the vital spirits and identified the valve as a worm-like structure in the cerebellum (vermis, for worm, later called vermiform epiphysis, known today as the vermis cerebelli or cerebellar vermis). In his attempt to understand the function of the gland, he traced the surrounding blood vessels from which he identified the great vein of the cerebellum, later called the vein of Galen. Failing to discover the function, he believed that the pineal gland was merely a structural support for the cerebral veins.

== Medieval scholars ==
Galen's biology received serious attention as science became more objective during the medieval period, but with a lot of confusion between what he described as vermis and conarium. In one of the earliest attempts to investigate the source of memory, the Melkite physician Qusta ibn Luqa (864–923 CE) indicated the pineal gland as the passage of memory (like a valve) from the posterior ventricle in his book De differentia inter animam et spiritum (On the difference between spirit and soul); but mentioned the gland as the vermiform or vermis. To worsen the misidentification, a 13th-century Dominican scholar, Vincent of Beauvais, at the Cistercian monastery of Royaumont Abbey, France, specifically introduced the Latin name pinea for the memory-conveying vermiform structure, and not the pineal gland. In his masterpiece, Speculum Maius, he wrote:

[Modern translation] Around the middle ventricle there is a part of the brain matter called pinea, which is similar to a worm. This part of the brain regulates an opening, through which the animal spirit transits from the forebrain to the hindbrain. It opens only to remember things that have been forgotten, or to retain what we do not want to forget.

Mondino dei Luzzi, a physician at Bologna, Italy, added to the confusion when he named part of the ventricle as vermis, the structure later renamed choroid plexus, but sometimes referred to as vermiform process. Thus, there were three structures in the brain known by the name worm during the medieval period.

The valve or guardian nature of the pineal gland was revived, and up to the 16th century, widely regarded as the correct description. The most important challenge to the notion was by Andreas Vesalius, who systematically depicted that the gland could not be a valve. His anatomical description in 1543 became the first recorded graphical document of the pineal gland.

=== Location of the soul and Cartesian theory ===
With the revival of the ancient Greeks's notion of the pineal gland, the search for the location of the soul was among the biggest issues in Medieval Christianity. It was generally believed that the soul must be present in the brain as a physical entity, the doctrine introduced by Augustine of Hippo in the 5th century. According to Augustine in De Trinitate (400–416), a human being is composed of a body and a soul, and the soul is present in every part of the body. Saint Thomas Aquinas refined the concept in Summa Theologiae (1485) stating that the body and the soul are a single substance. This idea of monism was the theological dogma in Christianity.

Seventeenth-century philosopher and scientist René Descartes was highly interested in anatomy and physiology. He discussed the pineal gland both in his first book, the Treatise of Man (written before 1637, but only published posthumously 1662/1664), and in his last book, The Passions of the Soul (1649) and he regarded it as "the principal seat of the soul and the place in which all our thoughts are formed". He derived his interpretations from the anatomical descriptions of Vesalius. In the Treatise of Man, Descartes described conceptual models of man, namely creatures created by God, which consist of two ingredients, a body and a soul. In the Passions, Descartes split man up into a body and a soul and emphasized that the soul is joined to the whole body by "a certain very small gland situated in the middle of the brain's substance and suspended above the passage through which the spirits in the brain's anterior cavities communicate with those in its posterior cavities". Descartes attached significance to the gland because he believed it to be the only section of the brain to exist as a single part rather than one-half of a pair. Some of Descartes's basic anatomical and physiological assumptions were totally mistaken, not only by modern standards, but also in light of what was already known in his time.

The Latin name pinealis became popular in the 17th century. In 1681, English physician Thomas Willis gave a detailed structural description as glandula pinealis. In his 1664 book, Cerebri anatome cui accessit nervorum descriptio et usus,Willis argued against Descartes' concept, remarking: "we can scarce[ly] believe this to be the seat of the Soul, or its chief Faculties to arise from it; because Animals, which seem to be almost quite destitute of Imagination, Memory, and other superior Powers of the Soul, have this Glandula or Kernel large and fair enough."

== Modern research ==
=== Discovery of the third eye ===
Walter Baldwin Spencer at the University of Oxford was the first to recognize pineal gland and its associated structure in lizards. In 1886, he found that the pineal tissue in some species were connected to an eye-like structure which he called the pineal eye or parietal eye, as they were associated with the parietal foramen and the pineal stalk. The main pineal body was already discovered by German zoologist Franz Leydig in 1872. Leydig described cup-like protrusions under the middle portion of the brains of European lizards and believing them to be a kind of glands, called them frontal organ (German stirnorgan). In 1918, Swedish zoologist Nils Holmgren described the parietal eye in frogs and dogfish. He found that the structure was composed of sensory cells similar to the cone cells of the retina. He did not find any evidence of it being glandular in function, and instead suggested that it was a primitive light-sensor organ (photoreceptor).

=== Discovery of the hormone ===
The pineal gland was originally believed to be a "vestigial remnant" of a larger organ. In 1917, it was known that extract of cow pineals lightened frog skin. Dermatology professor Aaron B. Lerner and colleagues at Yale University, hoping that a substance from the pineal might be useful in treating skin diseases, isolated and named the hormone melatonin in 1958. The substance did not prove to be helpful as intended, but its discovery helped solve several mysteries such as why removing the rat's pineal accelerated ovary growth, why keeping rats in constant light decreased the weight of their pineals, and why pinealectomy and constant light affect ovary growth to an equal extent; this knowledge gave a boost to the then new field of chronobiology.
