= Etilefrine pivalate =

Chemical compound

Clinical data
- Other names: Etilephrine pivalate; Ethylnorphenylephrine pivalate; Pivalyletilefrine; 3,β-Dihydroxy-N-ethylphenethylamine 3-pivalate

Identifiers
- IUPAC name: [3-[2-(ethylamino)-1-hydroxyethyl]phenyl] 2,2-dimethylpropanoate
- CAS Number: 85750-39-6
- PubChem CID: 157211
- ChemSpider: 138362
- UNII: 3RLD929C4S
- ChEBI: CHEBI:134737
- ChEMBL: ChEMBL2105571
- CompTox Dashboard (EPA): DTXSID10868931

Chemical and physical data
- Formula: C_{15}H_{23}NO_{3}
- Molar mass: 265.353 g·mol^{−1}
- 3D model (JSmol): Interactive image
- SMILES: CCNCC(C1=CC(=CC=C1)OC(=O)C(C)(C)C)O
- InChI: InChI=1S/C15H23NO3/c1-5-16-10-13(17)11-7-6-8-12(9-11)19-14(18)15(2,3)4/h6-9,13,16-17H,5,10H2,1-4H3; Key:DRMHNJGOEAYOIZ-UHFFFAOYSA-N

Etilefrine pivalate INN; developmental code name K-30052) is a sympathomimetic agent which was never marketed. It is the 3-pivalate ester of etilefrine (ethylnorphenylephrine) and has much greater lipophilicity than etilefrine. Some related compounds include pivenfrine (phenylephrine pivalate) and dipivefrine (epinephrine dipivalate), which were developed as mydriatic agents.
