= Souvenaid =

Dietary supplement

Souvenaid is a dietary supplement in the form of a thick, yogurt-like drink that, despite lack of any evidence while studies strongly suggests the contrary, is marketed as helping people with Alzheimer's disease. It contains a mixture of water, food coloring, artificial flavors, sugar, docosahexaenoic acid, eicosapentaenoic acid, phospholipids, choline, uridine monophosphate, vitamin E (alpha-tocopherol equivalents), selenium, vitamin B_{12}, vitamin B_{6}, and folic acid; this mixture is branded as Fortasyn Connect.

As of 2017, the product had failed to show a significant effect in decreasing the rate of cognitive decline or delaying progression of Alzheimer's disease, but appeared to cause minor improvement in verbal memory in some people in the very early stages of the disease. The clinical trials that had been conducted were in people with very early Alzheimer's disease and excluded people who ate recommended amounts of food that included fish oil.

In 2019, a study conducted by a consultant of a company for medico-marketing strategy claim a potential indication of effect of Fortasyn Connect through the LipiDidi study with regards to the improvement of cognitive decline in early stages of the progression of dementia. It was claimed that ingestion of the product indicated some potential slowing of the decline of measures related to cognition, function, brain atrophy, and disease progression. No statistical significance or any effects beyond consuming recommended nutrients, vitamins and fishoils was achieved. Partitioners taking cognitive enhancers were allowed in the study while partitioners taking omega-3 preparations, or folic acid, vitamins B6, B12, C, and/or E at >200% the recommended daily intake (which is what this product contain and are readibly available through other sources) were excluded.

Souvenaid was originally created by the Dutch company Numico Research, which was acquired by Danone (Dannon in the US) in 2007 and is marketed by Nutricia, a division of Danone.

The product is based in part on basic research work done by Richard Wurtman at Massachusetts Institute of Technology, and MIT and Harvard patented the mixture and licensed the patent to the company. The theory behind the ingredients included in Souvenaid is that they are components or precursors to components of synaptic membranes, the theory that problems with synapse formation are part of the pathology of Alzheimer's disease, and the idea that these problems might be caused or exacerbated by a lack of those components in the diets of people who develop Alzheimer's disease.

As of 2013 it was marketed through pharmacies in Brazil, the Netherlands, Belgium, Germany, Italy, the UK, and Australia. In the UK pharmacists have to undergo a training course and take an online test from the manufacturer before they can sell it.

In January 2014, the French regulatory authorities rejected the manufacturer's proposed marketing claims on the basis that target population and its nutritional needs were not well defined and the statistically weak data in the evidence provided.
