= Dibutepinephrine =

Clinical data
- Other names: Diisobutyrylepinephrine; Diisobutanoylepinephrine; Diisobutyryladrenaline; Diisobutanoyladrenaline
- Drug class: Sympathomimetic

Identifiers
- IUPAC name: [4-[(1R)-1-hydroxy-2-(methylamino)ethyl]-2-(2-methylpropanoyloxy)phenyl] 2-methylpropanoate
- CAS Number: 2735735-23-4
- PubChem CID: 163203538
- ChemSpider: 129309334
- UNII: 3ZU4LVA3G9
- KEGG: D12934
- ChEMBL: ChEMBL5314457

Chemical and physical data
- Formula: C_{17}H_{25}NO_{5}
- Molar mass: 323.389 g·mol^{−1}
- 3D model (JSmol): Interactive image
- SMILES: CC(C)C(=O)OC1=C(C=C(C=C1)[C@H](CNC)O)OC(=O)C(C)C
- InChI: InChI=1S/C17H25NO5/c1-10(2)16(20)22-14-7-6-12(13(19)9-18-5)8-15(14)23-17(21)11(3)4/h6-8,10-11,13,18-19H,9H2,1-5H3/t13-/m0/s1; Key:XUROVJXCRSDXKR-ZDUSSCGKSA-N

Dibutepinephrine (INN; USAN; also known as diisobutyrylepinephrine) is a sympathomimetic drug which has not been marketed at this time. It is the 3,4-O-diisobutyryl ester and hence a prodrug of epinephrine (adrenaline).

== See also ==
- Dipivefrine
- Neurotransmitter prodrug
