= Pivenfrine =

Chemical compound

Clinical data
- Other names: Pivalylphenylephrine; Phenylephrine pivalate; β,3-Dihydroxy-N-methylphenethylamine 3-pivalate
- ATC code: None

Identifiers
- IUPAC name: 3-[1-Hydroxy-2-(methylamino)ethyl]phenyl pivalate
- CAS Number: 67577-23-5
- PubChem CID: 130545
- ChemSpider: 115481
- UNII: RB4XQ0T71U
- ChEMBL: ChEMBL2107163
- CompTox Dashboard (EPA): DTXSID80867279

Chemical and physical data
- Formula: C_{14}H_{21}NO_{3}
- Molar mass: 251.326 g·mol^{−1}
- 3D model (JSmol): Interactive image
- SMILES: CC(C)(C)C(=O)Oc1cccc(c1)C(CNC)O
- InChI: InChI=1S/C14H21NO3/c1-14(2,3)13(17)18-11-7-5-6-10(8-11)12(16)9-15-4/h5-8,12,15-16H,9H2,1-4H3; Key:DQCAWJLMFJKICG-UHFFFAOYSA-N

Pivenfrine (INN), also known as pivalylphenylephrine or phenylephrine pivalate, is a sympathomimetic and mydriatic agent which was never marketed. It is the 3-pivalyl ester of phenylephrine. Pivenfrine has much greater lipophilicity than phenylephrine. Higher lipophilicity is known to greatly improve corneal permeability, as in dipivefrine (epinephrine dipivalate). Another related compound is etilefrine pivalate (ethylnorphenylephrine pivalate).
