= DA-Phen =

Synthetic dopamine prodrug

Clinical data
- Other names: DA-Phe; DA-PHEN; Dopamine–phenylalanine conjugate
- Drug class: Monoamine precursor; Dopamine receptor agonist

Identifiers
- IUPAC name: 2-amino-N-[2-(3,4-dihydroxyphenyl)ethyl]-3-phenylpropanamide
- CAS Number: 54653-55-3
- PubChem CID: 21426279
- ChemSpider: 9522051

Chemical and physical data
- Formula: C_{17}H_{20}N_{2}O_{3}
- Molar mass: 300.358 g·mol^{−1}
- 3D model (JSmol): Interactive image
- SMILES: C1=CC=C(C=C1)CC(C(=O)NCCC2=CC(=C(C=C2)O)O)N
- InChI: InChI=1S/C17H20N2O3/c18-14(10-12-4-2-1-3-5-12)17(22)19-9-8-13-6-7-15(20)16(21)11-13/h1-7,11,14,20-21H,8-10,18H2,(H,19,22); Key:NBYUYHYHFPOSLI-UHFFFAOYSA-N

DA-Phen, also known as dopamine–phenylalanine conjugate, is a synthetic dopamine prodrug which is under preclinical evaluation. Dopamine itself is hydrophilic and is unable to cross the blood–brain barrier, thus showing peripheral selectivity. DA-Phen was developed as a dopamine prodrug that would allow for entry into the central nervous system via passive diffusion and/or active transport.

DA-Phen is a conjugate of dopamine and the amino acid phenylalanine (Phe or Phen). It is slowly cleaved by brain enzymes (t_{½} = 460 minutes) to yield free dopamine but is also rapidly hydrolyzed in human blood plasma (t_{½} = 28 minutes). The drug was intended as a prodrug but may also directly interact with the dopamine D_{1}-like and/or D_{2}-like receptors. DA-Phen has shown centrally mediated effects in animals, including increased cognitive flexibility, improved spatial learning and memory, antidepressant- and anxiolytic-like effects, and decreased ethanol intake.

Other analogues, such as DA-Trp and DA-Leu, have also been developed and studied.

== See also ==
- Neurotransmitter prodrug
- Lisdexamfetamine (dextroamphetamine–lysine conjugate)
- DopAmide
- Docarpamine
