= Fosopamine =

Clinical data
- Other names: Fosfenamine; N-Methyldopamine 4-O-phosphate; Epinine 4-O-phosphate; SIM-2055; Z-2055
- Routes of administration: Oral
- Drug class: Dopamine receptor agonist

Identifiers
- IUPAC name: [2-hydroxy-4-[2-(methylamino)ethyl]phenyl] dihydrogen phosphate
- CAS Number: 103878-96-2
- PubChem CID: 65878
- ChemSpider: 59287
- UNII: 50Q2Q042YR
- ChEMBL: ChEMBL2104671
- CompTox Dashboard (EPA): DTXSID70869409

Chemical and physical data
- Formula: C_{9}H_{14}NO_{5}P
- Molar mass: 247.187 g·mol^{−1}
- 3D model (JSmol): Interactive image
- SMILES: CNCCC1=CC(=C(C=C1)OP(=O)(O)O)O
- InChI: InChI=1S/C9H14NO5P/c1-10-5-4-7-2-3-9(8(11)6-7)15-16(12,13)14/h2-3,6,10-11H,4-5H2,1H3,(H2,12,13,14); Key:WHEGQKBWPSOMHG-UHFFFAOYSA-N

Fosopamine (INN; developmental code names SIM-2055, Z-2055; also known as fosfenamine or N-methyldopamine 4-O-phosphate) is a dopamine receptor agonist of the phenethylamine and catecholamine families which was under development for the treatment of hypertension but was never marketed. It is taken orally. Fosopamine is a prodrug of epinine (N-methyldopaine) and is said to be selectively metabolized into epinine in the kidneys. The drug was being developed by AstraZeneca and Zambon Group SpA. It reached phase 2 clinical trials prior to the discontinuation of its development.

== See also ==
- Neurotransmitter prodrug
