= Cyclic 3-hydroxymelatonin =

Names
- IUPAC name 1-[(3aS,8bR)-8b-Hydroxy-7-methoxy-1,2,3a,4-tetrahydropyrrolo[2,3-b]indol-3-yl]ethanone

Identifiers
CAS Number	220890-80-2
3D model (JSmol)	Interactive image
ChemSpider	35031688
PubChem CID	100952227
UNII	YCG9VDC7QG
- InChI: InChI=1S/C13H16N2O3/c1-8(16)15-6-5-13(17)10-7-9(18-2)3-4-11(10)14-12(13)15/h3-4,7,12,14,17H,5-6H2,1-2H3/t12-,13+/m0/s1 Key: VADOSKJWFKUPQF-QWHCGFSZSA-N
- SMILES: CC(=O)N1CC[C@@]2([C@H]1NC3=C2C=C(C=C3)OC)O

Properties
Chemical formula	C_{13}H_{16}N_{2}O_{3}
Molar mass	248.282 g·mol^{−1}
- Except where otherwise noted, data are given for materials in their standard state (at 25 °C [77 °F], 100 kPa). Infobox references

Cyclic 3-hydroxymelatonin (3-OHM) is a metabolite of melatonin and an antioxidant more potent than melatonin. It is a non-radical species and does not further propagate the radical chain reaction

It is a footprint product of the reaction between melatonin and hydroxyl radical.

== See also ==
- Cyclized tryptamine
