= Α-Methyltryptophan =

Serotonergic drug

α-Methyltryptophan

Clinical data
- Other names: αMTP; α-MTP; AMTP; α-Methyl-L-tryptophan; alpha-Methyltryptophan; alpha-Methyl-L-tryptophan
- Drug class: Serotonin receptor agonist

Identifiers
- IUPAC name: (2S)-2-amino-3-(1H-indol-3-yl)-2-methylpropanoic acid
- CAS Number: 16709-25-4
- PubChem CID: 676155
- ChemSpider: 588899
- UNII: 1F33TJ4ZOP
- CompTox Dashboard (EPA): DTXSID60350250

Chemical and physical data
- Formula: C_{12}H_{14}N_{2}O_{2}
- Molar mass: 218.256 g·mol^{−1}
- 3D model (JSmol): Interactive image
- SMILES: C[C@](CC1=CNC2=CC=CC=C21)(C(=O)O)N
- InChI: InChI=1S/C12H14N2O2/c1-12(13,11(15)16)6-8-7-14-10-5-3-2-4-9(8)10/h2-5,7,14H,6,13H2,1H3,(H,15,16)/t12-/m0/s1; Key:ZTTWHZHBPDYSQB-LBPRGKRZSA-N

α-Methyltryptophan (αMTP or α-MTP) is a synthetic tryptamine derivative, an artificial amino acid, and a prodrug of α-methylserotonin (αMS). It is the α-methylated derivative of tryptophan, while αMS is the α-methylated analogue of serotonin. αMTP has been suggested for potential therapeutic use in the treatment of conditions thought by some authors to be related to serotonin deficiency, such as depression. In labeled forms, αMTP is also used as a radiotracer in positron emission tomography (PET) imaging to assess serotonin synthesis and certain other processes.

αMS is a non-selective serotonin receptor agonist, including of the serotonin 5-HT_{2} receptors, and has been described as a "substitute neurotransmitter" of serotonin. However, whereas αMS itself is too hydrophilic to efficiently cross the blood–brain barrier, thus being peripherally selective, αMTP is able to cross the blood–brain barrier and, following transformation, deliver αMS into the brain.

Besides αMS, αMTP is also metabolized into α-methyltryptamine (αMT). αMT is a serotonin–norepinephrine–dopamine releasing agent, a non-selective serotonin receptor agonist, and a serotonergic psychedelic. However, αMT levels are much lower than those of αMS with αMTP and αMT is described as a minor metabolite of αMTP. In accordance, the behavioral effects of αMTP and αMT in animals are described as strikingly different. α-Methylmelatonin can also be formed in small amounts from αMTP, but the formation of this compound with αMTP in vivo appears to be negligible.

αMTP and αMS remain in the body for long amounts of time following a single dose of αMTP, whereas tryptophan results in only a short-lasting increase in brain serotonin levels. This is attributed to the resistance to metabolism of these compounds afforded by their α-methyl group. As such, αMTP might be advantageous for therapeutic purposes relative to tryptophan. αMTP is useful over tryptophan in PET imaging because αMTP, unlike tryptophan, is not incorporated as an amino acid into brain proteins, and because, unlike serotonin, αMS is not a substrate for monoamine oxidase (MAO) and hence remains in the brain for a much longer amount of time. The preceding limitations of tryptophan make its use in PET imaging in humans impossible, whereas αMTP is a viable agent for such purposes.

αMTP is first converted by tryptophan hydroxylase into α-methyl-5-hydroxytryptophan (αM-5-HTP or α-methyl-5-HTP), the α-methylated analogue of 5-hydroxytryptophan (5-HTP), prior to being decarboxylated by aromatic L-amino acid decarboxylase (AAAD) into αMS. αM-5-HTP has also been suggested for potential therapeutic use. However, αM-5-HTP is also a tyrosine hydroxylase inhibitor similarly to α-methyltyrosine, as well as an AAAD inhibitor, and has been found to deplete levels of brain norepinephrine in animals, although not levels of brain dopamine.

== See also ==
- O-Acetylbufotenine (O-acetyl-N,N-dimethylserotonin)
- α-Methylphenylalanine
- Metirosine (α-methyltyrosine)
- Methyldopa (α-methyl-DOPA)
- Neurotransmitter prodrug
