= Docarpamine =

Dopamine prodrug

Clinical data
- Trade names: Tanadopa
- Other names: TA-870; TA870; N-(N-Acetyl-L-methionyl)-O,O-bis(ethoxycarbonyl)dopamine
- Routes of administration: Oral, intravenous
- Drug class: Dopamine prodrug; Dopamine receptor agonist

Identifiers
- IUPAC name: [4-[2-[[(2S)-2-acetamido-4-methylsulfanylbutanoyl]amino]ethyl]-2-ethoxycarbonyloxyphenyl] ethyl carbonate
- CAS Number: 74639-40-0
- PubChem CID: 71137
- DrugBank: DB18046
- ChemSpider: 64283
- UNII: RPQ57D8S72
- KEGG: D01903
- ChEBI: CHEBI:31513
- ChEMBL: ChEMBL2106351
- CompTox Dashboard (EPA): DTXSID1057820

Chemical and physical data
- Formula: C_{21}H_{30}N_{2}O_{8}S
- Molar mass: 470.54 g·mol^{−1}
- 3D model (JSmol): Interactive image
- SMILES: CCOC(=O)OC1=C(C=C(C=C1)CCNC(=O)[C@H](CCSC)NC(=O)C)OC(=O)OCC
- InChI: InChI=1S/C21H30N2O8S/c1-5-28-20(26)30-17-8-7-15(13-18(17)31-21(27)29-6-2)9-11-22-19(25)16(10-12-32-4)23-14(3)24/h7-8,13,16H,5-6,9-12H2,1-4H3,(H,22,25)(H,23,24)/t16-/m0/s1; Key:ZLVMAMIPILWYHQ-INIZCTEOSA-N

Docarpamine (INN, JAN), sold under the brand name Tanadopa, is an orally active dopamine prodrug which is marketed in Japan for the treatment of acute cardiac insufficiency and/or chronic heart failure. It is used orally and intravenously.

In terms of bioactivation, the hydroxyl groups of docarpamine are freed by esterases in the gut and liver and the amino group is freed by γ-glutamyltransferase in the kidney and liver. There is an intermediate, dideethoxycarbonyldocarpamine (DECD), in which the hydroxyl substitutions have been hydrolyzed. The N-substitution protects the drug from first-pass metabolism by monoamine oxidase (MAO) until it is cleaved into dopamine and allows it to be orally active. The drug does not cross the blood–brain barrier or affect the central nervous system even at high doses and hence is peripherally selective. The predicted log P (XLogP3) of docarpamine is 2.9. It is thought that the therapeutic effects of docarpamine are mediated by activation of peripheral dopamine D_{1} receptors.

Although docarpamine is orally active and can achieve therapeutic levels of dopamine in blood, relatively high doses and frequent administration of the drug (e.g., 600–750 mg every 8 hours) are required when it is used by this route. Its duration of action orally is described as greater than 4 hours.

The drug was first described in the scientific literature by 1980.

== See also ==
- Neurotransmitter prodrug
- DA-Phen
- Dopexamine
- Ibopamine
- O,O′-Diacetyldopamine
- O,O′-Dipivaloyldopamine
