= Richard Wurtman =

American neuroscientist (1936–2022)

- Born: March 9, 1936; Philadelphia, Pennsylvania, U.S.
- Died: December 13, 2022 (aged 86)
- Education: University of Pennsylvania (BA), Harvard Medical School (MD)
- Scientific career
- Fields: Neuroscience
- Workplaces: MIT, Harvard

Richard Wurtman (March 9, 1936 – December 13, 2022) was an American neuroscientist who spent his career doing basic and translational neuroscience research at Massachusetts Institute of Technology. Wurtman co-founded Interneuron Pharmaceuticals (later known as Indevus) and held the patent for dexfenfluramine and melatonin's use as a sleep aid.

== Early life and education ==
Richard Wurtman earned his undergraduate degree at University of Pennsylvania and then went to Harvard Medical School, where he earned his MD in 1960. He did a two year residency at Massachusetts General Hospital, and then joined Julius Axelrod's lab at the National Institutes of Health, which was pioneering studies of neurotransmitters and the ways that drugs affect them.

== Career ==
In 1967, Massachusetts Institute of Technology invited him to open a lab to continue the NIH work in the Department of Nutrition and Food Science, which was the only department doing in vivo work at the time. In the 1980s, MIT formed a new department of Brain and Cognitive Sciences, which pulled together people working on psychology, neuroscience, and neuroscience, and Wurtman joined it.

In 1994, he was appointed the first Cecil H. Green Distinguished Professor at MIT, and by that time was also a professor of neuroscience in MIT’s Department of Brain & Cognitive Sciences, and a professor of Neuropharmacology in the Harvard–MIT Division of Health Sciences & Technology.

Wurtman retired in 2011, and by that time he had published around 1,000 papers and trained around 300 students and post-docs.

== Notable findings ==
Much of Wurtman's work at MIT involved discovering a new function of an existing biolecule, like a hormone or neurotransmitter, figuring out how that discovery might be useful in medicine, and then trying to use that biomolecule as a drug itself, or using an existing drug to affect its function, a strategy called drug repurposing. His early affiliation with people in nutrition and food science also led him to consider ways that food and nutrient affect health.

Wurtman was involved in the evaluations of aspartame when it was first being introduced as an artificial sweetener; he initially testified on behalf of its manufacturer that it was safe, but subsequent research led him to call, in 1983, for further testing due to his concerns that consuming large amounts (not small amounts) could be harmful.

In 1994 his lab published work showing that melatonin is a hormone, secreted at night-time, needed for the induction & maintenance of normal sleep. The first patent for melatonin's use as a low-dose sleep aid was granted to Wurtman in 1995.

Along with Nicholas Zervas of Beth Israel Hospital and Harvard Medical School, another early area of Wurtman's research pertained to the neurotransmitter dopamine, and its role in stroke physiology. Wurtman's studies occurred at a time of significant growth in research and understanding of neurotransmitters, with optimistic expectations for practical outcomes.

In the 2000s his lab started exploring food components that could help maintain or improve the health of the brain, focusing on choline, uridine, and the omega-3 fatty acid DHA; this work became incorporated into the medical food product, Souvenaid.

Serotoninergic synapses are thus a useful target for drugs to treat obesity and other conditions which affect appetite and mood (e.g. premenstrual syndrome; seasonal depression). The patent for using fluoxetine to treat premenstrual dysphoric disorder was licensed to Wurtman's startup, Interneuron, which in turn sold them to Lilly. This became the product marketed as Sarafem.

== Commercial activities ==
Wurtman co-founded Interneuron Pharmaceuticals in 1988, which was renamed to Indevus in 2002. Indevus brought an in-licensed product, Trospium chloride, to market before being acquired by Endo Pharmaceuticals in 2009 for $370 million in cash and $267 million in milestones.

Wurtman's patent on using dexfenfluramine, an isomer of fenfluramine, to suppress appetite was also licensed to Interneuron, which licensed the patents to Wyeth; this drug was withdrawn from the market in 1997 after "Phen-fen" was found to be harmful.

Wurtman also founded Back Bay Scientific, Inc. along with his wife and daughter; the company sells dietary supplements.

== Publications ==
Among Wurtman's publications are the following:

- Scheltens, P.; Kamphuis, P.J.; Verhey, F.R.J.; Olde Rikkert, M.; Wurtman, R.J.; et al. (January 2010), "The Efficacy of a medical food in early Alzheimer's Disease: A randomized controlled trial", Alzheimer's & Dementia, 6 (1): 1–10, doi:10.1016/j.jalz.2009.10.003, PMID 20129316, S2CID 15011189
- Wurtman R.J.; Cansev M; Sakamoto T; Ulus I.H (2009), "Use of phosphatide precursors to promote synaptogenesis", Annual Review of Nutrition, 29: 59–87, doi:10.1146/annurev-nutr-080508-141059, PMID 19400698
- Wurtman, R.J.; Cansev, M.; Ulus, I. (2009), "Choline and its products acetylcholine and phosphatidylcholine" (PDF), in Lathja, A (ed.), Handbook of Neurochemistry, vol. 8, Berlin, Heidelberg: Springer-Verlag
- Wurtman, R.J. (April 2006), "Physiology and clinical use of melatonin", UpToDate: 1–24
- Wurtman, R.J.; Wurtman, J.J.; Regan, M.M.; McDermott, J.M.; Tsay, R.H.; Breu, J.J. (January 2003), "Effects of meals rich in carbohydrates or proteins on the plasma tryptophan ratio and brain serotonin", American Journal of Clinical Nutrition, 77 (1): 128–132, doi:10.1093/ajcn/77.1.128, PMID 12499331
- Zhdanova, I.V.; Wurtman, R.J.; Regan, M.M.; Taylor, J.A.; Shi, J.P.; LeClair, O.U. (2001), "Melatonin treatment for age-related insomnia", Journal of Clinical Endocrinology and Metabolism, 86 (10): 4727–4730, doi:10.1210/jcem.86.10.7901, PMID 11600532. Note: If webpage opens then reverts to error message, repeated use of return button should stabilise link, as was achieved for this citation.
- Wurtman, R.J.; Wurtman, J.J. (January 1989), "Carbohydrates and depression" (PDF), Scientific American, 260 (1): 68–75, Bibcode:1989SciAm.260a..68W, doi:10.1038/scientificamerican0189-68, PMID 2642626
- Wurtman, R.J.; Hefti, F.; Melamed, E (1981), "Precursor Control of Neurotransmitter Synthesis" (PDF), Pharmacological Reviews, 32 (4): 315–335, PMID 6115400
- Wurtman, R.J (April 1982), "Nutrients That Modify Brain Function", Scientific American, 246 (4): 50–59, Bibcode:1982SciAm.246d..50W, doi:10.1038/scientificamerican0482-50, PMID 6123150. Pagination may vary in editions published in different geographical regions. The article and number of pages is however the same.
- Cohen, Edith L; Wurtman, Richard J (Feb 13, 1976), "Brain Acetylcholine: Control by Dietary Choline" (PDF), Science, 191 (4227): 561–562, Bibcode:1976Sci...191..561C, doi:10.1126/science.1251187, PMID 1251187
