= Aaron B. Lerner =

American medical researcher and physician

Aaron Bunsen Lerner (September 21, 1920 – February 3, 2007) was an American physician, researcher and professor who is known for the discovery of melatonin. He was the first chair of the Department of Dermatology at Yale University.

== Life and career ==
Born in 1920 in Minneapolis, Lerner received his medical degree and a PhD in chemistry from the University of Minnesota in 1945. After teaching at the universities of Michigan and Oregon, he joined the Yale University School of Medicine as an associate professor of medicine in 1955. The following year he became director of the dermatology section within the Department of Internal Medicine, and when the Department of Dermatology was established in 1971 he was appointed its first chair. When Professor Lerner retired in 1991, he was named a Professor Emeritus of Dermatology. He was in 1973 elected to membership in the National Academy of Sciences (Medical physiology and metabolism).

Lerner is perhaps best known for leading the team of researchers who isolated and named, in 1958, the hormone melatonin. He was an expert in the metabolic basis of inherited diseases, particularly vitiligo for which he, in the 1980s, developed a skin transplantation therapy. Lerner also isolated the compound melanocyte-stimulating hormone (MSH).

Lerner was married to Marguerite Rush Lerner, an author of children's books and a book about admission to medical school (Medical School: The Interview and the Applicant). Their two sons are both dermatologists.
