= Irwin Kopin =

American biochemist

Irwin J. "Irv" Kopin (1929–2017) was an American biochemist, best known for his research on the function and metabolism of catecholamines.

== Early life ==
Kopin was born in New York, where his father ran a mirror factory. He first attended the City College of New York for two years, where he excelled in mathematics. Two years later he transferred to McGill University in Canada, there completing his B.Sc. in biochemistry in 1951 and then his M.D. in 1955. At McGill, outside of his academic work Kopin was a member of the swim team, as a member of which he became famous for a 16-meet winning streak in the 1949–1950 season which was only brought to an end by Olympian Joe Verdeur of La Salle University. It was also during his McGill years that Kopin met his wife Rita in an organic chemistry class they took together; they married on June 8, 1952. Rita went on to a career as a museum education consultant.

== Career ==
After his medical school graduation, Kopin did his residency at Boston City Hospital. When he was informed in his second year there that he was to be drafted, he found a government post with the United States Public Health Service, where he worked as a statistician on a tuberculosis research team, before transferring to the National Institute of Mental Health, where he worked under Seymour Kety. At the NIMH, Kopin began his research collaboration with Julius Axelrod. In 1968, Kety left NIMH for Harvard; Axelrod did not want to take on administrative responsibilities, and so Kopin took over the position of lab chief. Among his research assistants were William E. Bunney and Frederick K. Goodwin.

In 1984, Kopin moved from the NIMH to the National Institute of Neurological Disorders and Stroke (NINDS) to become scientific director of the Division of Intramural Research at the invitation of Murray Goldstein. He retired in 1994, naming Zach Hall as his successor.

== Research ==
By 2000, Kopin had published 710 papers, continuing his work with members of his former laboratory even after his formal retirement. At NIMH, he came up with the false neurotransmitter theory to explain the action of drugs such as monoamine oxidase inhibitors, and studied the relationship between the neurotoxin MPTP and Parkinson's disease.

Selected papers include:

- Burns, RS; Chiueh, CC; Markey, SP; Ebert, MH; Jacobowitz, DM; Kopin, IJ (1983-07-01). "A primate model of parkinsonism: selective destruction of dopaminergic neurons in the pars compacta of the substantia nigra by N-methyl-4-phenyl-1,2,3,6-tetrahydropyridine". Proceedings of the National Academy of Sciences of the United States of America. 80 (14): 4546–4550. Bibcode:1983PNAS...80.4546B. doi:10.1073/pnas.80.14.4546. PMC 384076. PMID 6192438.

== Death ==
Kopin died on August 1, 2017. His funeral service was held at Congregation Beth El in Bethesda, Maryland. NINDS and NIMH held a symposium in his memory the following year.
