= Α-Methylphenylalanine =

Monoamine metabolism inhibitor

α-Methylphenylalanine

Clinical data
- Other names: α-MePhe; α-Me-Phe; α-Methyl-Phe; AMPA; α-Methyl-L-Phenylalanine
- Drug class: Tyrosine hydroxylase inhibitor; Phenylalanine hydroxylase inhibitor; Catecholamine depleting agent; Catecholamine releasing agent

Identifiers
- IUPAC name: (2S)-2-amino-2-methyl-3-phenylpropanoic acid
- CAS Number: 23239-35-2
- PubChem CID: 2724754
- ChemSpider: 2006873
- UNII: W4V7K5BM5T
- ChEBI: CHEBI:141138
- ChEMBL: ChEMBL4249392

Chemical and physical data
- Formula: C_{10}H_{13}NO_{2}
- Molar mass: 179.219 g·mol^{−1}
- 3D model (JSmol): Interactive image
- SMILES: C[C@](CC1=CC=CC=C1)(C(=O)O)N
- InChI: InChI=1S/C10H13NO2/c1-10(11,9(12)13)7-8-5-3-2-4-6-8/h2-6H,7,11H2,1H3,(H,12,13)/t10-/m0/s1; Key:HYOWVAAEQCNGLE-JTQLQIEISA-N

α-Methylphenylalanine (α-MePhe or AMPA) is an artificial amino acid and a phenethylamine and amphetamine derivative. It is the α-methylated analogue of phenylalanine, the precursor of the catecholamine neurotransmitters, and the amino acid analogue of amphetamine (α-methylphenethylamine), a psychostimulant and monoamine releasing agent.

α-MePhe is a tyrosine hydroxylase inhibitor, thereby preventing the transformation of tyrosine into L-DOPA, and results in depletion of the catecholamine neurotransmitters. It is also an inhibitor of phenylalanine hydroxylase, and in conjunction with phenylalanine administration, induces hyperphenylalaninemia analogous to that in phenylketonuria in animals. The drug is known to produce metaraminol (3,β-dihydroxyamphetamine), a catecholamine releasing agent, as an active metabolite in animals, and this metabolite contributes to its effects.

α-MePhe is a substrate of the L-type amino acid transporter 1 (LAT1), which transports it across the blood–brain barrier into the central nervous system.

== See also ==
- Fenclonine (para-chlorophenylalanine)
- Metirosine (α-methyl-para-tyrosine)
- Methyldopa (α-methyl-DOPA)
- α-Methyltryptophan
- 3,4-Dihydroxystyrene
