= Kopin Liu =

Kopin Liu (Chinese: 劉國平; born 25 January 1949) is a Taiwanese physical chemist.

== Education and career ==
Liu graduated from National Tsing Hua University in 1971 and subsequently pursued his doctorate at Ohio State University in the United States. He initiated his research career at the Georgia Institute of Technology, then moved to Argonne National Laboratory, where he spent over a decade until 1993. Upon returning to Taiwan, Liu has held various positions at Academia Sinica. In 2000, he mentioned that working at Academia Sinica meant a large pay cut, but he was driven to educate and mentor future Taiwanese scientists while conducting research. Liu received two consecutive five-year grants as a fellow of the Foundation for the Advancement of Outstanding Scholarship, an organization founded by Yuan T. Lee in 1994. In 1998, Liu was granted fellowship by the American Physical Society. Equivalent honors were bestowed by The World Academy of Sciences in 2005, and the Royal Society of Chemistry in 2013. He became a member of the Academia Sinica in 2004 and the European Academy of Sciences in 2018. Liu has served as distinguished research chair professor within the department of physics at National Taiwan University since 2010. From 2010 to 2012, Liu was honorary chair professor at National Tsing Hua University. He is a 2011 recipient of the Humboldt Research Award.
