= False neurotransmitter =

A false neurotransmitter is a chemical compound which closely imitates the action of a neurotransmitter in the nervous system. Examples include 5-MeO-αMT (mimicking serotonin) and α-methyldopa. Another compound that has been discussed as a possible false neurotransmitter is octopamine.

These chemicals can be accumulated by a neuron or secretory cell, are then packaged in secretory / synaptic vesicles, and then released with other neurotransmitters when an action potential provides the necessary stimulus for release.

The concept of a false transmitter is credited to Irwin Kopin of the National Institute of Neurological Disorders and Stroke who determined that the drug tyramine increased blood pressure by being loaded and then released from secretory vesicles of the adrenal chromaffin cells. Tyramine can also be converted into octopamine by dopamine β-hydroxylase (DBH) which itself acts as a false transmitter by displacing noradrenaline from its vesicle but not activating the postsynaptic α-adrenergic receptor.

There is growing evidence that a large number of well known exogenous chemicals work as substitute neurotransmitters, though the distinction between the classical model and the substitute neurotransmitter model only becomes apparent with neurotransmitters central to the signaling in the conscious brain, like dopamine and serotonin (as mentioned above). By extension, drugs that affect the uptake affinity of neurotransmitter transporters directly affect the efficacy of these substitute neurotransmitters, as shown by the interference that selective serotonin reuptake inhibitors have on serotonergic psychedelic drugs.

A family of fluorescent false neurotransmitters have been developed by Dalibor Sames and David Sulzer at Columbia University that act as analogs for dopamine and other monoamines and enable an optical means for video analysis of neurotransmitter uptake and release.

== See also ==
- α-Methyltryptophan
- α-Methylserotonin
