= N1-Acetyl-N2-formyl-5-methoxykynuramine =

N^{1}-Acetyl-N^{2}-formyl-5-methoxykynuramine

Names
- IUPAC name N-[3-(2-formamido-5-methoxyphenyl)-3-oxopropyl]acetamide

Identifiers
CAS Number	52450-38-1
3D model (JSmol)	Interactive image
ChEBI	CHEBI:194285
ChEMBL	ChEMBL1882218
ChemSpider	149637
EC Number	637-059-2
KEGG	C05642
PubChem CID	171161
UNII	S82P8JZ4YJ
CompTox Dashboard (EPA)	DTXSID90200451
- InChI: InChI=1S/C13H16N2O4/c1-9(17)14-6-5-13(18)11-7-10(19-2)3-4-12(11)15-8-16/h3-4,7-8H,5-6H2,1-2H3,(H,14,17)(H,15,16) Key: JYWNYMJKURVPFH-UHFFFAOYSA-N
- SMILES: CC(=O)NCCC(=O)C1=C(C=CC(=C1)OC)NC=O

Properties
Chemical formula	C_{13}H_{16}N_{2}O_{4}
Molar mass	264.281 g·mol^{−1}

Hazards
- GHS labelling
Pictograms	(GHS06: Toxic)
Signal word	Danger
Hazard statements	H301
Precautionary statements	P264, P270, P301+P316, P321, P330, P405, P501
- Except where otherwise noted, data are given for materials in their standard state (at 25 °C [77 °F], 100 kPa). Infobox references

N^{1}-Acetyl-N^{2}-formyl-5-methoxykynuramine (AMFK) is a metabolite of melatonin and an antioxidant.
