= O,O′-Diacetyldopamine =

Experimental dopamine prodrug

Clinical data
- Other names: 3,4-O-Diacetyldopamine; 3,4-Diacetoxyphenethylamine; 3,4-Diacetoxy-2-phenylethylamine

Identifiers
- IUPAC name: [2-acetyloxy-4-(2-aminoethyl)phenyl] acetate
- CAS Number: 48167-07-3
- PubChem CID: 70377349
- ChemSpider: 26491686

Chemical and physical data
- Formula: C_{12}H_{15}NO_{4}
- Molar mass: 237.255 g·mol^{−1}
- 3D model (JSmol): Interactive image
- SMILES: CC(=O)OC1=C(C=C(C=C1)CCN)OC(=O)C
- InChI: InChI=1S/C12H15NO4/c1-8(14)16-11-4-3-10(5-6-13)7-12(11)17-9(2)15/h3-4,7H,5-6,13H2,1-2H3; Key:JEDOTSDAIMLSND-UHFFFAOYSA-N

O,O′-Diacetyldopamine, or 3,4-O-diacetyldopamine, also known as 3,4-diacetoxyphenethylamine, is a synthetic derivative of dopamine in which both of the hydroxyl groups have been acetylated.

== Description ==
The drug was an attempt at creating a more lipophilic analogue and prodrug of dopamine which could potentially be used medically for central nervous system indications like treatment of Parkinson's disease.

Dopamine itself is too hydrophilic to cross the blood–brain barrier and hence is peripherally selective. This, in part, prevents dopamine itself from being employed pharmaceutically for such uses. Whereas the experimental log P of dopamine is -0.98, the predicted log P (XLogP3) of O,O′-diacetyldopamine is 0.3. The optimal log P for brain permeation and central activity is about 2.1 (range 1.5–2.7).

O,O′-Diacetyldopamine proved to be inactive in animal behavioral tests. This suggests that dopamine O-acetylation alone is insufficient to allow for brain permeability. However, synthetic dopamine derivatives that were both O-acetylated and N-alkylated, with further increased lipophilicity, for instance N,N-dimethyl-O,O′-acetyldopamine (XLogP3 = 1.3), were robustly active in behavioral tests, including reversal of behavioral depression induced by the dopamine depleting agent tetrabenazine.

Other dopamine analogues and prodrugs have also been developed and studied.

== See also ==
- Neurotransmitter prodrug
- O,O′-Dipivaloyldopamine
- Docarpamine
- O-Acetylbufotenine
