= O,O′-Dipivaloyldopamine =

Synthetic dopamine prodrug

Clinical data
- Other names: Dipivaloyldopamine; Dipivaloyl dopamine; Dipivalyldopamine; Dipivalyl dopamine; Dopamine dipivalate; 3,4-Dipivaloyloxyphenethylamine; 3,4-Dipivaloyloxy-2-phenylethylamine

Identifiers
- IUPAC name: [4-(2-aminoethyl)-2-(2,2-dimethylpropanoyloxy)phenyl] 2,2-dimethylpropanoate
- CAS Number: 48198-89-6
- PubChem CID: 14280486
- ChemSpider: 14331814

Chemical and physical data
- Formula: C_{18}H_{27}NO_{4}
- Molar mass: 321.417 g·mol^{−1}
- 3D model (JSmol): Interactive image
- SMILES: CC(C)(C)C(=O)OC1=C(C=C(C=C1)CCN)OC(=O)C(C)(C)C
- InChI: InChI=1S/C18H27NO4/c1-17(2,3)15(20)22-13-8-7-12(9-10-19)11-14(13)23-16(21)18(4,5)6/h7-8,11H,9-10,19H2,1-6H3; Key:YERQWGUWIPSYAS-UHFFFAOYSA-N

O,O′-Dipivaloyldopamine, or simply dipivaloyldopamine, also known as 3,4-dipivaloyloxyphenethylamine, is a synthetic derivative of dopamine in which both of the hydroxyl groups have been acetylated. It was developed as a lipophilic prodrug of dopamine that would allow for entry of dopamine into the central nervous system.

Dopamine itself is too hydrophilic to cross the blood–brain barrier and hence is peripherally selective. This, in part, prevents dopamine itself from being employed medically for central nervous system uses. Whereas the experimental log P of dopamine is -0.98, the predicted log P (XLogP3) of O,O'-dipivaloyldopamine is 3.1. The optimal log P for brain permeation and central activity is at least 1.5.

O,O′-Dipivaloyldopamine produced hypothermia in animals, thought to be a centrally mediated dopaminergic effect, but failed to reverse behavioral depression induced by the monoamine depleting agent reserpine. On the other hand, another analogue, N,N-dimethyl-O,O′-dipivaloyldopamine (XLogP3 = 4.1), produced both hypothermia and reversed reserpine-induced behavioral depression.

== See also ==
- Neurotransmitter prodrug
- O,O′-Diacetyldopamine
- Docarpamine
- Dipivefrin (O,O′-dipivalylepinephrine)
- O-Pivalylbufotenine
