= Α-Methylserotonin =

Chemical compound

α-Methylserotonin

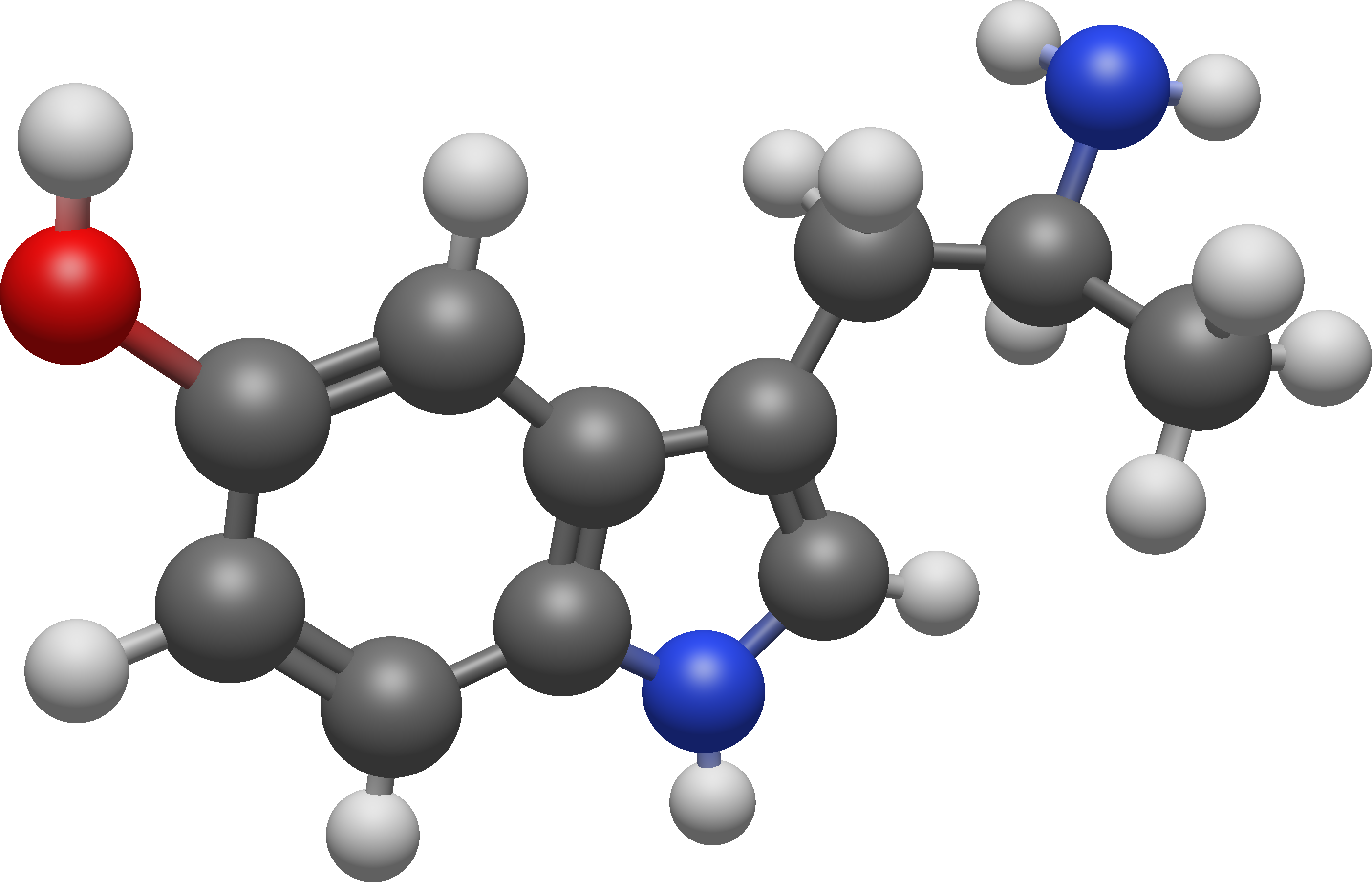

Clinical data
- Routes of administration: Oral
- Drug class: Non-selective serotonin receptor agonist
- ATC code: None

Legal status
- Legal status: Uncontrolled (but may be covered under the Federal Analogue Act in the United States and under similar bills in other countries)

Identifiers
- IUPAC name: 3-(2-aminopropyl)-1H-indol-5-ol
- CAS Number: 304-52-9
- PubChem CID: 2107
- IUPHAR/BPS: 152
- ChemSpider: 2023
- UNII: 5Y83TBC5NM
- ChEBI: CHEBI:48295
- ChEMBL: ChEMBL275854
- CompTox Dashboard (EPA): DTXSID10657549

Chemical and physical data
- Formula: C_{11}H_{14}N_{2}O
- Molar mass: 190.246 g·mol^{−1}
- 3D model (JSmol): Interactive image
- SMILES: c2cc(O)cc1c2[nH]cc1CC(N)C
- InChI: InChI=1S/C11H14N2O/c1-7(12)4-8-6-13-11-3-2-9(14)5-10(8)11/h2-3,5-7,13-14H,4,12H2,1H3; Key:LYPCGXKCQDYTFV-UHFFFAOYSA-N

α-Methylserotonin (αMS), also known as α-methyl-5-hydroxytryptamine (α-methyl-5-HT) or as 5-hydroxy-α-methyltryptamine (5-HO-αMT), is a tryptamine derivative closely related to the neurotransmitter serotonin (5-HT). It acts as a non-selective serotonin receptor agonist and has been used extensively in scientific research to study the function of the serotonin system.

== Use and effects ==
According to Alexander Shulgin in his book TiHKAL (Tryptamines I Have Known and Loved), αMS is well-studied in preclinical research but has not been tested in humans.

== Pharmacology ==
=== Pharmacodynamics ===
αMS is a non-selective and near-full agonist of the serotonin 5-HT_{2} receptors. It has similar affinity for the 5-HT_{2A}, 5-HT_{2B}, and 5-HT_{2C} receptors. The drug is also a ligand of the serotonin 5-HT_{1} receptors with high affinity, including of the serotonin 5-HT_{1A}, 5-HT_{1B}, and 5-HT_{1D} receptors (K_{i} = 40–150 nM), but not of the serotonin 5-HT_{1E} receptor (K_{i} > 10,000 nM). In addition to its actions at the serotonin receptors, αMS has been found to act as a norepinephrine releasing agent similarly to α-methylphenylalanine and to other α-alkylated tryptamines.

In contrast to DOI, and in spite of its potent serotonin 5-HT_{2A} receptor agonism, αMS did not produce the head-twitch response, a behavioral proxy of psychedelic effects, in rats. However, it was only assessed at a dose of up to 1 mg/kg, which is around the maximally effective dose of DOI.

=== Pharmacokinetics ===
Unlike serotonin, αMS is not metabolized by monoamine oxidase on account of the α-methyl substituent blocking the enzyme's access to the amine. Similarly to serotonin however, αMS poorly crosses the blood–brain barrier due to its free hydroxyl group and poor lipophilicity, and thus may have weak or no central effects when administered peripherally.

== Chemistry ==
αMS, also known as α-methyl-5-hydroxytryptamine (α-methyl-5-HT), is a substituted tryptamine derivative and the α-methylated analogue of serotonin (5-hydroxytryptamine or 5-HT).

=== Properties ===
The predicted log P (XLogP3) of αMS is 0.6.

=== Analogues ===
α-Methyltryptophan (αMTP) and α-methyl-5-hydroxytryptophan (α-Me-5-HTP) are prodrugs of αMS which cross the blood–brain barrier and thus efficiently deliver αMS into the central nervous system. As a result, these compounds act as orally bioavailable false or substitute neurotransmitters for serotonin, and have been suggested as possible therapeutic agents in the treatment of disorders where serotonin is deficient. The O-methylated analogue of αMS, 5-MeO-αMT (α,O-dimethylserotonin; α,O-DMS), also readily enters the brain, and could be used for such purposes as well.

== Society and culture ==
=== Legal status ===
==== Canada ====
αMS is not an explicitly nor implicitly controlled substance in Canada as of 2025.

==== United States ====
αMS is not scheduled at the federal level in the United States, but it could be considered an analogue of α-methyltryptamine (AMT), in which case, purchase, sales, or possession could be prosecuted under the Federal Analog Act.

===== Florida =====
αMS is a Schedule I controlled substance in the state of Florida making it illegal to buy, sell, or possess in Florida.

== See also ==
- Substituted α-alkyltryptamine
- 2-Methyl-5-hydroxytryptamine
- 5-Carboxamidotryptamine
- 5-Methoxytryptamine
- α-Methyldopamine
