= Melatonin =

Amine hormone

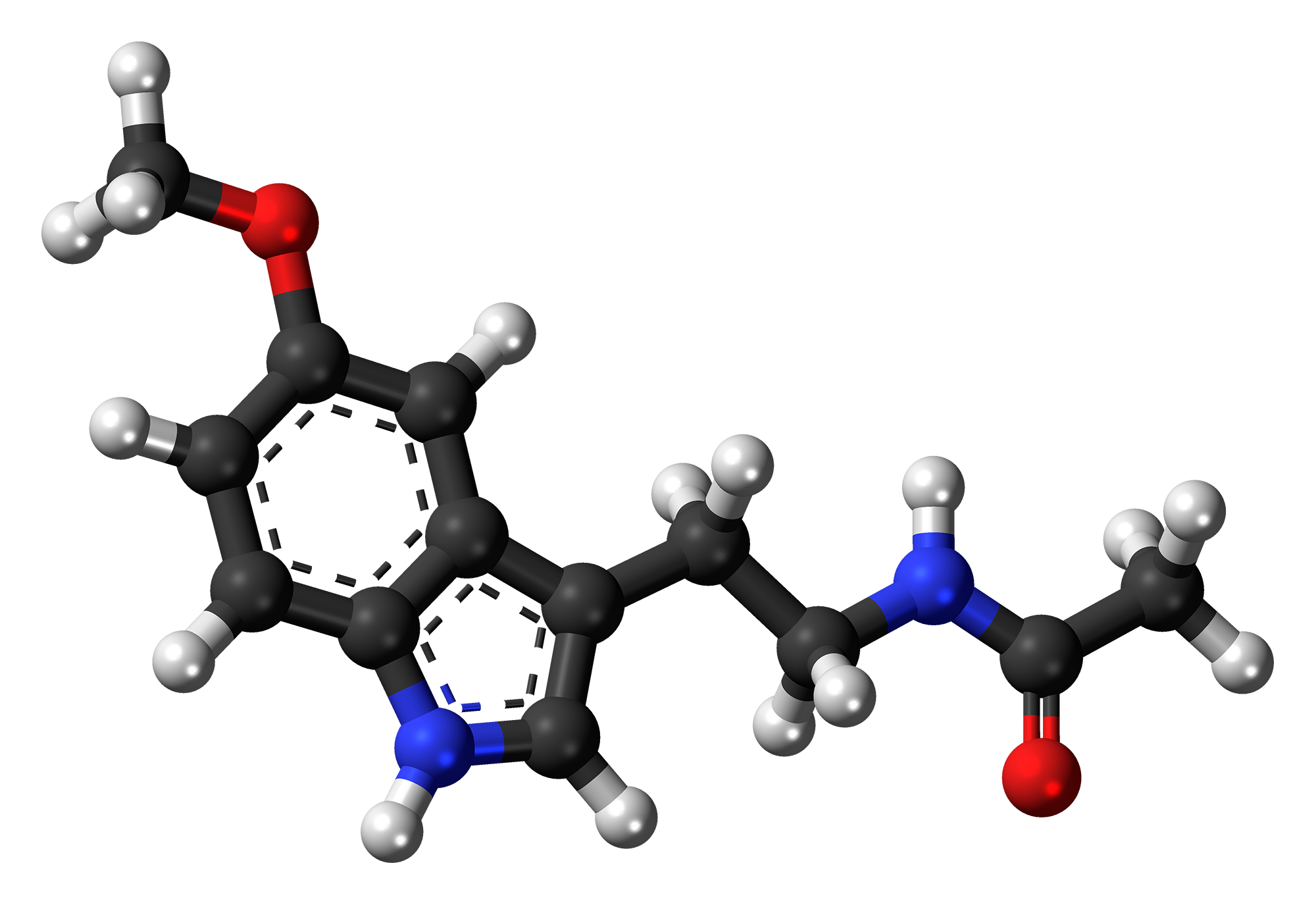

Names
- IUPAC name N-[2-(5-Methoxy-1H-indol-3-yl)ethyl]acetamide
- Other names 5-Methoxy-N-acetyltryptamine; 5-MeO-NAcT; N-Acetyl-5-methoxytryptamine; NSC-113928

Identifiers
CAS Number	73-31-4
3D model (JSmol)	Interactive image
ChEBI	CHEBI:16796
ChEMBL	ChEMBL45
ChemSpider	872
DrugBank	DB01065
ECHA InfoCard	100.000.725
EC Number	200-797-7200-797-7
KEGG	C01598
MeSH	Melatonin
PubChem CID	896
UNII	JL5DK93RCL
CompTox Dashboard (EPA)	DTXSID1022421
- InChI: InChI=1S/C13H16N2O2/c1-9(16)14-6-5-10-8-15-13-4-3-11(17-2)7-12(10)13/h3-4,7-8,15H,5-6H2,1-2H3,(H,14,16) Key: DRLFMBDRBRZALE-UHFFFAOYSA-N
- SMILES: CC(=O)NCCC1=CNC2=C1C=C(C=C2)OC

Properties
Chemical formula	C_{13}H_{16}N_{2}O_{2}
Molar mass	232.283 g·mol^{−1}
Melting point	117 °C (243 °F; 390 K)
- Except where otherwise noted, data are given for materials in their standard state (at 25 °C [77 °F], 100 kPa). Infobox references

Melatonin is an indoleamine compound produced by various organisms, including bacteria and eukaryotes. It was discovered in 1958 by Aaron B. Lerner and colleagues in substance from the pineal gland of cows that could induce skin lightening in common frogs. The secretion of melatonin is influenced by the circadian rhythm, and it plays a role in regulating the sleep-wake cycle in vertebrates.

In vertebrates, melatonin functions to affect the timing of sleep-wake cycles, encompassing sleep-wake timing and blood pressure regulation, as well as controlling seasonal rhythmicity (circannual cycle), which includes reproduction, fattening, molting, and hibernation. Its effects are mediated through the activation of melatonin receptors and its activity as an antioxidant. In vertebrates, circulating melatonin is primary secreted from the pineal gland in response to darkness. In plants and bacteria, it serves as a defense mechanism against oxidative stress. Melatonin is also synthesized in mitochondria, where it may play a role in neutralizing reactive oxygen species.

Melatonin is sometimes administered exogenously as a dietary supplement and medication. It is used in the treatment of sleep-related disorders such as insomnia and various circadian rhythm sleep disorders.

It has been suggested that light-induced disruptions to melatonin production may underlie the association between light exposure before and during sleep and impaired sleep quality. It has also been suggested that melatonin disruption may be involved in negative cognitive, emotional, cardiovascular, and metabolic effects associated with nighttime artificial light exposure.

== Biological activity ==
In humans, melatonin acts as an agonist of its two cognate receptors: melatonin receptor 1 (MT_{1}) and melatonin receptor 2 (MT2), exhibiting picomolar binding affinity at both sites, though with a modestly higher affinity for MT_{1}. Both are G-protein coupled receptors and are typically coupled to G_{i/o}-type proteins. MT_{1} can also couple to G_{q}-type proteins.

In vitro, melatonin functions as a high-capacity antioxidant or free radical scavenger within mitochondria, playing a dual role in combating cellular oxidative stress. First, it directly neutralizes free radicals, and second, it promotes the gene expression of essential antioxidant enzymes, such as superoxide dismutase, glutathione peroxidase, glutathione reductase, and catalase. This increase in antioxidant enzyme expression is mediated through signal transduction pathways activated by the binding of melatonin to its receptors. Through these mechanisms, melatonin is presumed to protect cells against oxidative stress in ways beyond regulating the sleep-wake cycle.

== Biological functions ==
Visible light entering the eye and the cascading positive and negative signalling pathways to neuronal structures in the mammalian brain that may follow: When the eyes are exposed to sunlight, the pineal gland's melatonin production is suppressed, resulting in the secretion of hormones that promote wakefulness. Conversely, in the absence of light, the pineal gland synthesizes melatonin unabated, leading to feelings of drowsiness and facilitating the onset of sleep.

=== Circadian rhythm ===
Melatonin is involved in the regulation of sleep–wake cycles in humans. The establishment of regular melatonin levels in human infants occurs around the third month after birth, with peak concentrations observed between midnight and 8:00 am. It has been documented that melatonin production diminishes as a person ages. A shift in the timing of melatonin secretion is observed during adolescence. In adults, approximately 30 μg of melatonin is synthesized per day, nearly 80% of which occurs at night.

The antioxidant properties of melatonin were first established in 1993. In vitro studies have demonstrated that melatonin directly neutralizes various reactive oxygen species, including hydroxyl (OH•), and reactive nitrogen species such as nitric oxide (NO•). In plants, melatonin works synergistically with other antioxidants, enhancing the overall effectiveness of each antioxidant. It is about twice as potent as vitamin E at scavenging peroxyl radicals in vitro. The promotion of antioxidant enzyme expression, such as superoxide dismutase, glutathione peroxidase, glutathione reductase, and catalase, is mediated through melatonin receptor-triggered signal transduction pathways.

Melatonin's concentration in the mitochondrial matrix is significantly higher than that found in the blood plasma, where it may play a role in neutralizing reactive oxygen species.

The interaction of melatonin with reactive oxygen and nitrogen species results in the formation of metabolites also possessing anti-oxidant properties. These metabolites include cyclic 3-hydroxymelatonin, N1-acetyl-N2-formyl-5-methoxykynuramine (AFMK), and N1-acetyl-5-methoxykynuramine (AMK).

=== Immune system ===
Melatonin's interaction with the immune system is recognized, though the specifics of these interactions are not clear. An anti-inflammatory effect appears to be the most significant. The efficacy of melatonin in disease treatment has been the subject of limited trials, with most available data deriving from small-scale, preliminary studies. It is posited that any beneficial immunological impact is attributable to melatonin's action on high-affinity receptors (MT1 and MT2), which are present on immunocompetent cells. Preclinical investigations suggest that melatonin may augment cytokine production and promote the expansion of T cells, thereby potentially mitigating acquired immunodeficiencies.

=== Weight regulation ===
Melatonin's potential to regulate weight gain is posited to involve its inhibitory effect on leptin, a hormone that serves as a long-term indicator of the body's energy status.

== Biochemistry ==
=== Biosynthesis ===
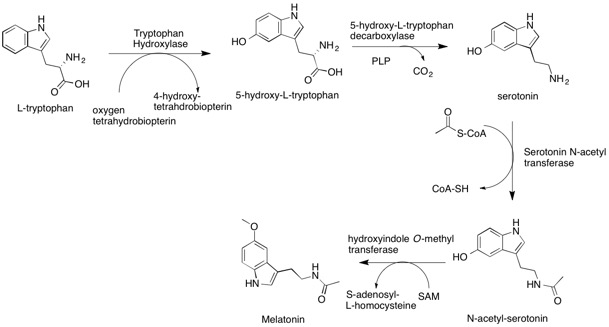
Melatonin biosynthesis

The biosynthesis of melatonin in animals involves a sequence of enzymatic reactions starting with L-tryptophan, which can be synthesized through the shikimate pathway from chorismate, found in plants, or obtained from protein catabolism. The initial step in the melatonin biosynthesis pathway is the hydroxylation of L-tryptophan's indole ring by the enzyme tryptophan hydroxylase, resulting in the formation of 5-hydroxytryptophan (5-HTP). Subsequently, 5-HTP undergoes decarboxylation, facilitated by pyridoxal phosphate and the enzyme 5-hydroxytryptophan decarboxylase, yielding serotonin.

Serotonin, an essential neurotransmitter, is further converted into N-acetylserotonin by the action of serotonin N-acetyltransferase, using acetyl-CoA. The final step in the pathway involves the methylation of N-acetylserotonin's hydroxyl group by hydroxyindole O-methyltransferase, with S-adenosyl methionine as the methyl donor, to produce melatonin.

In bacteria, protists, fungi, and plants, the synthesis of melatonin also involves tryptophan as an intermediate but originates indirectly from the shikimate pathway. The pathway commences with D-erythrose 4-phosphate and phosphoenolpyruvate, and in photosynthetic cells, additionally involves carbon dioxide. While the subsequent biosynthetic reactions share similarities with those in animals, there are slight variations in the enzymes involved in the final stages.

The hypothesis that melatonin synthesis occurs within mitochondria and chloroplasts suggests an evolutionary and functional significance of melatonin in cellular energy metabolism and defense mechanisms against oxidative stress, reflecting the molecule's ancient origins and its multifaceted roles across different domains of life.

=== Mechanism ===
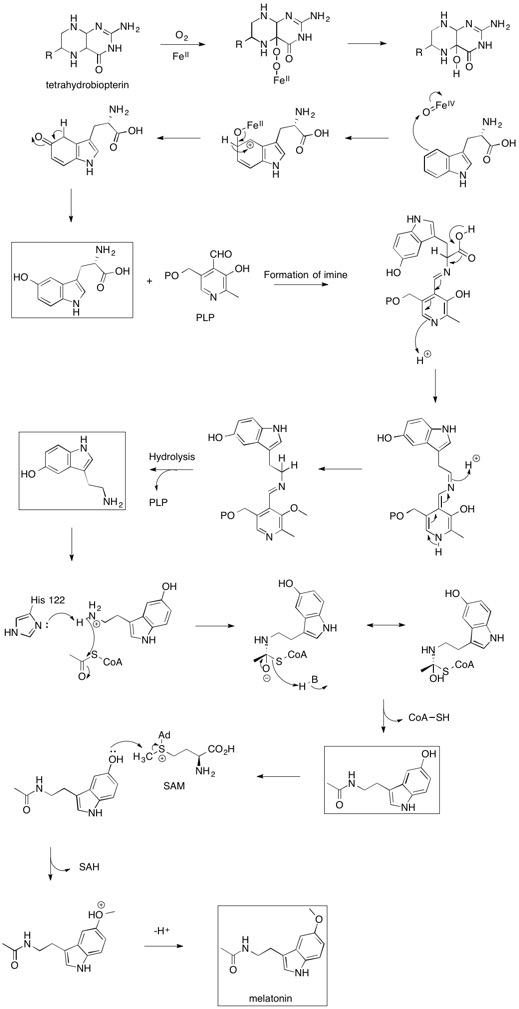
Mechanism of melatonin biosynthesis

The mechanism of melatonin biosynthesis initiates with the hydroxylation of L-tryptophan, a process that requires the cofactor tetrahydrobiopterin (THB) to react with oxygen and the active site iron of tryptophan hydroxylase. Although the complete mechanism is not entirely understood, two main mechanisms have been proposed:

The first mechanism involves a slow transfer of one electron from THB to molecular oxygen (O_{2}), potentially producing a superoxide (O^{−}_{2}). This superoxide could then recombine with the THB radical to form 4a-peroxypterin. 4a-peroxypterin may either react with the active site iron (II) to create an iron-peroxypterin intermediate or directly transfer an oxygen atom to the iron, facilitating the hydroxylation of L-tryptophan.

Alternatively, the second mechanism proposes that oxygen interacts with the active site iron (II) first, forming iron (III) superoxide. This molecule could then react with THB to form an iron-peroxypterin intermediate.

Following the formation of iron (IV) oxide from the iron-peroxypterin intermediate, this oxide selectively attacks a double bond to yield a carbocation at the C5 position of the indole ring. A subsequent 1,2-shift of the hydrogen and the loss of one of the two hydrogen atoms on C5 would restore aromaticity, producing 5-hydroxy-L-tryptophan.

The decarboxylation of 5-hydroxy-L-tryptophan to produce 5-hydroxytryptamine is then facilitated by a decarboxylase enzyme with pyridoxal phosphate (PLP) as a cofactor. PLP forms an imine with the amino acid derivative, facilitating the breaking of the carbon–carbon bond and release of carbon dioxide. The protonation of the amine derived from tryptophan restores the aromaticity of the pyridine ring, leading to the production of 5-hydroxytryptamine and PLP.

Serotonin N-acetyltransferase, with histidine residue His122, is hypothesized to deprotonate the primary amine of 5-hydroxytryptamine. This deprotonation allows the lone pair on the amine to attack acetyl-CoA, forming a tetrahedral intermediate. The thiol from coenzyme A then acts as a leaving group when attacked by a general base, producing N-acetylserotonin.

The final step in the biosynthesis of melatonin involves the methylation of N-acetylserotonin at the hydroxyl position by SAM, resulting in the production of S-adenosyl homocysteine (SAH) and melatonin.

=== Regulation ===
In vertebrates, the secretion of melatonin is regulated through the activation of the beta-1 adrenergic receptor by the hormone norepinephrine. Norepinephrine increases the concentration of intracellular cAMP via beta-adrenergic receptors, which in turn activates the cAMP-dependent protein kinase A (PKA). PKA then phosphorylates arylalkylamine N-acetyltransferase (AANAT), the penultimate enzyme in the melatonin synthesis pathway. When exposed to daylight, noradrenergic stimulation ceases, so AANAT is not phosphorylated. In the absence of phosphorylation, AANAT is immediately degraded by proteasomal proteolysis.

Blue light, especially within the 460–480 nm range, inhibits the biosynthesis of melatonin, with the degree of suppression being directly proportional to the intensity and duration of light exposure. Historically, humans in temperate climates experienced limited exposure to blue daylight during winter months, primarily receiving light from sources that emitted predominantly yellow light, such as fires. The incandescent light bulbs used extensively throughout the 20th century emitted relatively low levels of blue light. It has been found that light containing only wavelengths greater than 530 nm does not suppress melatonin under bright-light conditions. The use of glasses that block blue light in the hours preceding bedtime can mitigate melatonin suppression. Additionally, wearing blue-blocking goggles during the last hours before bedtime is recommended for individuals needing to adjust to an earlier bedtime since melatonin facilitates the onset of sleep.

=== Metabolism ===
Melatonin is metabolized with an elimination half-life ranging from 20 to 50 minutes. The primary metabolic pathway transforms melatonin into 6-hydroxymelatonin, which is then conjugated with sulfate and excreted in urine as a waste product. It is primarily metabolized by the liver enzyme CYP1A2 and to a lesser extent by CYP1A1, CYP2C19, and CYP1B1.

=== Measurement ===
For both research and clinical purposes, melatonin levels in humans can be determined through saliva or blood plasma analysis.

== Applications ==
=== Insomnia ===
An extended-release pharmaceutical formulation of melatonin is approved under the brand name Circadin for the treatment of insomnia in certain settings, such as in people aged 55 years of age or older. It is approved in the European Union, Israel, Australia, and countries in Asia and elsewhere in the world, but not in the United States (where it reached phase III clinical trials but was not approved). The medication has been licensed since 2007.

The 2023, European Insomnia Guideline recommended use of prolonged-release melatonin for treatment of insomnia in people age 55 year of age or older for up to three months. It recommended against fast-release or over-the-counter melatonin for treatment of insomnia. These recommendations were based on several meta-analyses published in 2022 and 2023.

The American Academy of Sleep Medicine's 2017 clinical practice guidelines recommended against the use of melatonin in the treatment of insomnia due to poor effectiveness and very low quality of evidence.

=== Circadian rhythm sleep disorders ===
Melatonin may be useful in the treatment of delayed sleep phase syndrome.

Melatonin is known to reduce jet lag, especially in eastward travel. However, if it is not taken at the correct time, it can instead delay adaptation.

Melatonin appears to have limited use against the sleep problems of people who work shift work. Tentative evidence suggests that it increases the length of time people are able to sleep.

Meta-analyses, published between 2005 and 2017, appear to show different results as to whether melatonin is effective for circadian rhythm sleep disorders or not. Some found that it was effective, while others found no evidence of effectiveness. Meta-analyses of melatonin for delayed sleep phase syndrome that found it effective have reported that it improves time to sleep onset by about 40 minutes (0.67 hours) and advances onset of endogenous melatonin secretion by about 1.2 hours (72 minutes). One meta-analysis found that melatonin was notably more effective in improving sleep onset latency in people with delayed sleep phase syndrome than in people with insomnia (improvement of 39 minutes vs. 7 minutes, respectively). One meta-analysis found that melatonin was probably effective for jet lag syndrome.

=== REM sleep behavior disorder ===
Melatonin is a safer alternative than clonazepam in the treatment of REM sleep behavior disorder – a condition associated with the synucleinopathies like Parkinson's disease and dementia with Lewy bodies. However, clonazepam may be more effective. In any case, the quality of evidence for both treatments is very low and it is unclear whether either is definitely effective.

== Research ==
=== Dementia ===
A 2020 Cochrane review found no evidence that melatonin helped sleep problems in people with moderate to severe dementia due to Alzheimer's disease. A 2019 review found that while melatonin may improve sleep in minimal cognitive impairment, after the onset of Alzheimer's disease it had little to no effect. Melatonin may, however, help with sundowning (increased confusion and restlessness at night) in people with dementia.

=== Pain ===
A 2026 meta-analysis concluded that people taking melatonin supplements may experience relief from musculoskeletal pain similar in magnitude to the effects of typical analgesics. Although melatonin may be considered as an adjunct option for pain relief, it had only modest effects, and the quality of evidence for efficacy was low to moderate.

== Available forms ==
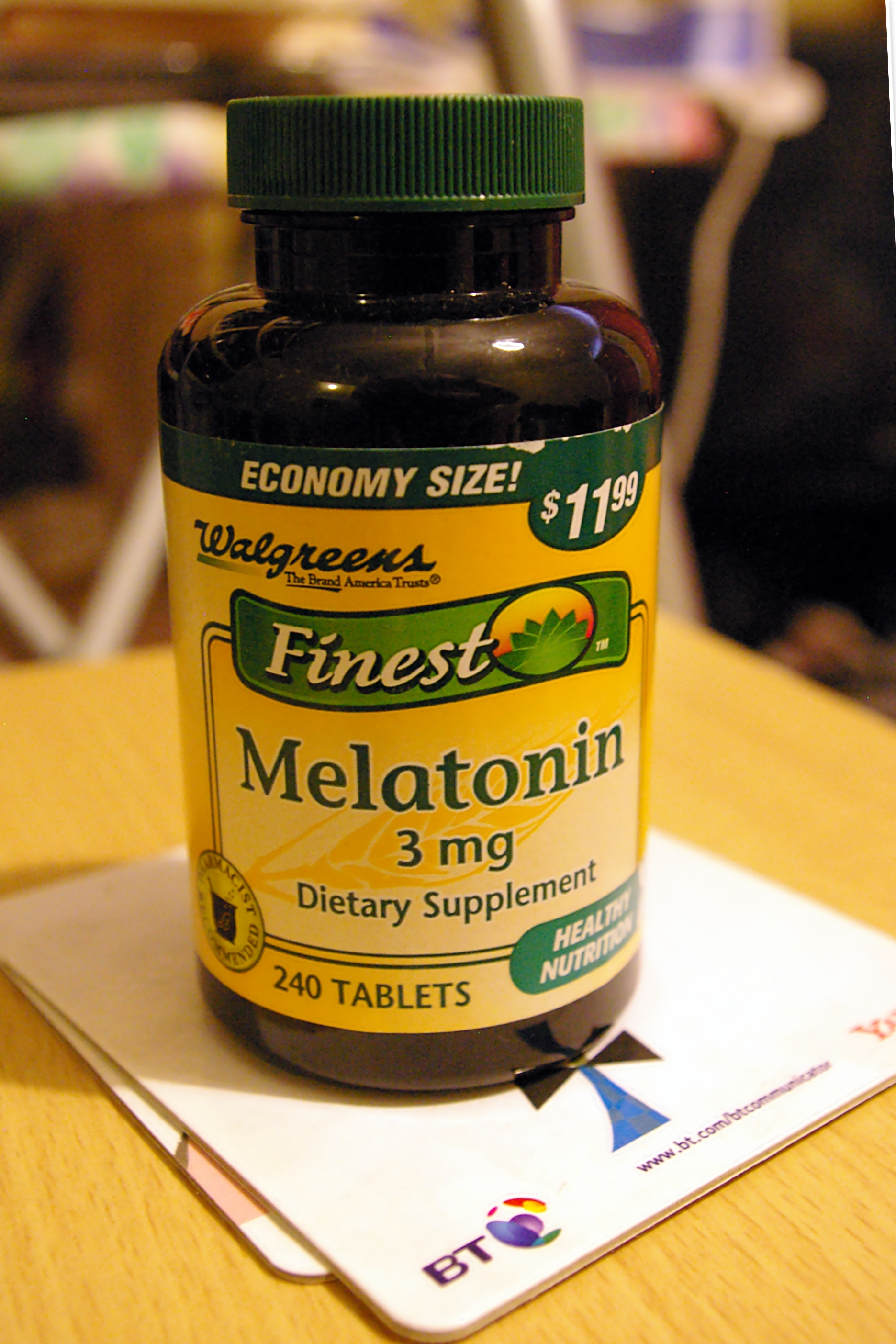
A bottle of melatonin tablets. Melatonin is also available in timed-release and in liquid forms.

A prolonged-release 2 mg oral formulation of melatonin sold under the brand name Circadin is approved for use in the European Union in the short-term treatment of insomnia in people aged 55 years of age or older.

Melatonin is also available as an over-the-counter dietary supplement in many countries. It is available in both immediate-release and less commonly prolonged-release forms. The compound is available in supplements at doses ranging from 0.3 mg to 10 mg or more. It is also possible to buy raw melatonin powder by weight. Immediate-release formulations of melatonin cause blood levels of melatonin to reach their peak in about an hour. The hormone may be administered orally, as capsules, gummies, tablets, oral films, or as a liquid. It is also available for use sublingually, or as transdermal patches. Several inhalation-based melatonin products with a wide range of doses are available but their safety remains to be evaluated.

== History ==
=== Discovery ===
Melatonin's discovery is linked to the study of color changes in some amphibians and reptiles, a phenomenon initially observed through the administration of pineal gland extracts. In 1917, Carey Pratt McCord and Floyd P. Allen found that feeding extracts from the pineal glands of cows caused the skin of tadpoles to lighten by contracting the dark epidermal melanophores.

The hormone melatonin was isolated in 1958 by Aaron B. Lerner, a dermatology professor, and his team at Yale University. Motivated by the possibility that a substance from the pineal gland could be beneficial in treating skin diseases, they extracted and identified melatonin from bovine pineal gland extracts. Subsequent research in the mid-1970s by Lynch and others demonstrated that melatonin production follows a circadian rhythm in human pineal glands.

The first patent for the therapeutic use of melatonin as a low-dose sleep aid was awarded to Richard Wurtman at the Massachusetts Institute of Technology in 1995.

=== Etymology ===
The etymology of melatonin stems from its skin-lightening properties. As detailed in their publication in the Journal of the American Chemical Society, Lerner and his colleagues proposed the name melatonin, derived from the Greek words melas, meaning 'black' or 'dark', and tonos, meaning 'labour', 'colour' or 'suppress'. This naming convention follows that of serotonin, another agent affecting skin color, discovered in 1948 as a modulator of vascular tone, which influenced its name based on its serum vasoconstrictor effect. Melatonin was thus aptly named to reflect its role in preventing the darkening of the skin, highlighting the intersection of biochemistry and linguistics in scientific discovery.

== Occurrence ==
=== Animals and Humans ===
In vertebrates, melatonin is produced in darkness, thus usually at night, by the pineal gland, a small endocrine gland located in the center of the brain but outside the blood–brain barrier. Light/dark information reaches the suprachiasmatic nuclei from retinal photosensitive ganglion cells of the eyes rather than the melatonin signal (as was once postulated). Known as "the hormone of darkness", the onset of melatonin at dusk promotes activity in nocturnal (night-active) animals and sleep in diurnal ones including humans.

In humans, ~30 μg of melatonin is produced daily and 80% of the total amount is produced in the night. The plasma maximum concentration of melatonin at night are 80–120 pg/mL and the concentrations during the day are between 10–20 pg/mL.

Many animals and humans use the variation in duration of melatonin production each day as a seasonal clock. In animals including humans, the profile of melatonin synthesis and secretion is affected by the variable duration of night in summer as compared to winter. The change in duration of secretion thus serves as a biological signal for the organization of daylength-dependent (photoperiodic) seasonal functions such as reproduction, behavior, coat growth, and camouflage coloring in seasonal animals. In seasonal breeders that do not have long gestation periods and that mate during longer daylight hours, the melatonin signal controls the seasonal variation in their sexual physiology, and similar physiological effects can be induced by exogenous melatonin in animals including mynah birds and hamsters. Melatonin can suppress libido by inhibiting secretion of luteinizing hormone and follicle-stimulating hormone from the anterior pituitary gland, especially in mammals that have a breeding season when daylight hours are long. The reproduction of long-day breeders is repressed by melatonin and the reproduction of short-day breeders is stimulated by melatonin. In sheep, melatonin administration has also shown antioxidant and immune-modulatory regime in prenatally stressed offspring helping them survive the crucial first days of their lives.

Cetaceans have lost all the genes for melatonin synthesis as well as those for melatonin receptors. This is thought to be related to their unihemispheric sleep pattern (one brain hemisphere at a time). Similar trends have been found in sirenians.

=== Plants ===
Until its identification in plants in 1987, melatonin was for decades thought to be primarily an animal neurohormone. When melatonin was identified in coffee extracts in the 1970s, it was believed to be a byproduct of the extraction process. Subsequently, however, melatonin has been found in all plants that have been investigated. It is present in all the different parts of plants, including leaves, stems, roots, fruits, and seeds, in varying proportions. Melatonin concentrations differ not only among plant species, but also between varieties of the same species depending on the agronomic growing conditions, varying from picograms to several micrograms per gram. Notably high melatonin concentrations have been measured in popular beverages such as coffee, tea, wine, and beer, and crops including corn, rice, wheat, barley, and oats. In some common foods and beverages, including coffee and walnuts,

Although a role for melatonin as a plant hormone has not been clearly established, its involvement in processes such as growth and photosynthesis is well established. Only limited evidence of endogenous circadian rhythms in melatonin levels has been demonstrated in some plant species and no membrane-bound receptors analogous to those known in animals have been described. Rather, melatonin performs important roles in plants as a growth regulator, as well as environmental stress protector. It is synthesized in plants when they are exposed to both biological stresses, for example, fungal infection, and nonbiological stresses such as extremes of temperature, toxins, increased soil salinity, drought, etc.

Herbicide-induced oxidative stress has been experimentally mitigated in vivo in a high-melatonin transgenic rice. Studies conducted on lettuce grown in saline soil conditions have shown that the application of melatonin significantly mitigates the harmful effects of salinity. Foliar application increases the number of leaves, their surface area, increases fresh weight and the content of chlorophyll a and chlorophyll b, and the content of carotenoids compared to plants not treated with melatonin.

Fungal disease resistance is another role. Added melatonin increases resistance in Malus prunifolia against Diplocarpon mali. Also acts as a growth inhibitor on fungal pathogens including Alternaria, Botrytis, and Fusarium spp. Decreases the speed of infection. As a seed treatment, protects Lupinus albus from fungi. Dramatically slows Pseudomonas syringae tomato DC3000 infecting Arabidopsis thaliana and infecting Nicotiana benthamiana.

=== Fungi ===
Melatonin has been observed to reduce stress tolerance in Phytophthora infestans in plant-pathogen systems. Danish pharmaceutical company Novo have used genetically modified yeast (Saccharomyces cerevisiae) to produce melatonin.

=== Bacteria ===
Melatonin is produced by α-proteobacteria and photosynthetic cyanobacteria. There is no report of its occurrence in archaea which indicates that melatonin originated in bacteria most likely to prevent the first cells from the damaging effects of oxygen in the primitive Earth's atmosphere.

Novo have used genetically modified Escherichia coli to produce melatonin.

=== Archaea ===
In 2022, the discovery of serotonin N-acetyltransferase (SNAT)—the penultimate, rate-limiting enzyme in the melatonin biosynthetic pathway—in the archaeon Thermoplasma volcanium firmly places melatonin biosynthesis in all three major domains of life, dating back to ~4 Gya.

=== Food products ===
Naturally occurring melatonin has been reported in foods including tart cherries to about 0.17–13.46 ng/g, bananas, plums, grapes, rice, cereals, herbs, olive oil, wine, and beer. The consumption of milk and sour cherries may improve sleep quality. When birds ingest melatonin-rich plant feed, such as rice, the melatonin binds to melatonin receptors in their brains. When humans consume foods rich in melatonin, such as banana, pineapple, and orange, the blood levels of melatonin increase significantly.
