= C12H14N2O =

The molecular formula C_{12}H_{14}N_{2}O (molar mass: 202.25 g/mol, exact mass: 202.1106 u) may refer to:

- Acetryptine, also known as 5-acetyltryptamine (5-AT)
- N-Acetyltryptamine
- BK-NM-AMT
- Coerulescine
- Dehydrobufotenine
- O-Methylnordehydrobufotenine
- Pinoline
- Tetrahydroharmol
- 1Z2MAP1O
- Shepherdine
