= Temgicoluril =

Anxiolytic medication

Clinical data
- Trade names: Adaptol, Mebicar
- Other names: Adaptol; Mebicar; Mebicarum; Mebikar; Tetramethylglycoluril; 1,3,4,6-Tetramethylglycoluril
- ATC code: N06BX21 (WHO)

Legal status
- Legal status: US: Unscheduled; not FDA approved

Pharmacokinetic data
- Metabolism: Gastrointestinal tract: 77–80%
- Elimination half-life: 3 hours
- Excretion: Urine: 55–70%

Identifiers
- IUPAC name: 1,3,4,6-Tetramethyltetrahydroimidazo[4,5-d]imidazole-2,5(1H,3H)-dione
- CAS Number: 10095-06-4
- PubChem CID: 122282
- DrugBank: DB13522
- ChemSpider: 109042
- UNII: 55FE6NPG89
- KEGG: D10508
- CompTox Dashboard (EPA): DTXSID60143588

Chemical and physical data
- Formula: C_{8}H_{14}N_{4}O_{2}
- Molar mass: 198.226 g·mol^{−1}
- 3D model (JSmol): Interactive image
- SMILES: CN1C2C(N(C1=O)C)N(C(=O)N2C)C
- InChI: InChI=1S/C8H14N4O2/c1-9-5-6(11(3)7(9)13)12(4)8(14)10(5)2/h5-6H,1-4H3; Key:XIUUSFJTJXFNGH-UHFFFAOYSA-N

Temgicoluril (INN), also known as tetramethylglycoluril and sold under the brand names Adaptol and Mebicar, is an anxiolytic medication produced by Latvian pharmaceutical company Olainfarm and sold in Latvia and Russia.

The chemical structure of temgicoluril is somewhat similar to uric acid and it doesn't interact with acids, alkali, oxidants and reducing agents. It seems to affect all major neurotransmitter systems.

Temgicoluril has an effect on the structure of limbic–reticular activity, particularly on hypothalamus emotional zone, as well as on all several basic neuromediator systems – γ-aminobutyric acid (GABA), choline, serotonin, and adrenergic activity. It decreases brain norepinephrine levels and increases brain serotonin levels without modulating dopaminergic systems or cholinergic systems.

Temgicoluril purportedly has anti-anxiety (anxiolytic) properties. It is also used to aid smoking cessation. In addition, temgicoluril may be useful in the treatment of ADHD symptoms. In contrast with typical anxiolytic medications such as benzodiazepines, temgicoluril is non-habit forming, non-sedating, and does not impair motor function.

As of 2021, temgicoluril has not been evaluated outside of Latvia and Russia.

== Synthesis ==
I: 1,3-dimethylurea, II: glyoxal, III: temgicoluril

It can be prepared by acid-catalysed condensation of 1,3-dimethylurea with glyoxal. One publication described such a procedure. They combined dimethylurea and glyoxal with a catalytic amount of phosphoric acid anhydride in an aqueous solution at room temperature and after sufficient time temgicoluril was conveniently isolated by filtration. The filtrate can be re-used by adding more dimethylurea and glyoxal (no additional catalyst is needed) and obtaining respectable yields, although this requires a longer reaction time.

== Medical uses ==
Temgicoluril is used in Latvia and Russia, as a pharmaceutical drug to treat anxiety and to prevent or reduce anxiety, unrest, fear, internal emotional tension and irritability, reduce neuroses and neurotic disorders, heartburns of non-coronary heart disease origin. These effects are not accompanied with relaxation of muscle tone and impaired coordination of movement, suppression of mental and physical activity, so the drug can be used without interruption of work or school.

Temgicoluril does not have a direct effect on sleep, however, it enhances the effectiveness of sleep medicines and normalizes the course of disturbed sleep. Temgicoluril alleviates or eliminates the manifestations of nicotine dependence that occur after smoking cessation. Although temgicoluril does not cause mood swings or euphoria, habituation, nor addiction, withdrawal syndrome has been observed.

== Side effects ==
Possible and rare side effects may include dizziness, hypotension, indigestion, allergic reactions (itchy skin) after high doses, hypothermia, fatigue. And lowered blood pressure and/or body temperature decreased by 1 to 1.5 °C. Blood pressure and body temperature return to normal after completion of treatment.

== See also ==
- Fabomotizole
- Phenibut
- Selank
- Validol
- Bemethyl
- List of Russian drugs
