= Fabomotizole =

Anxiolytic drug

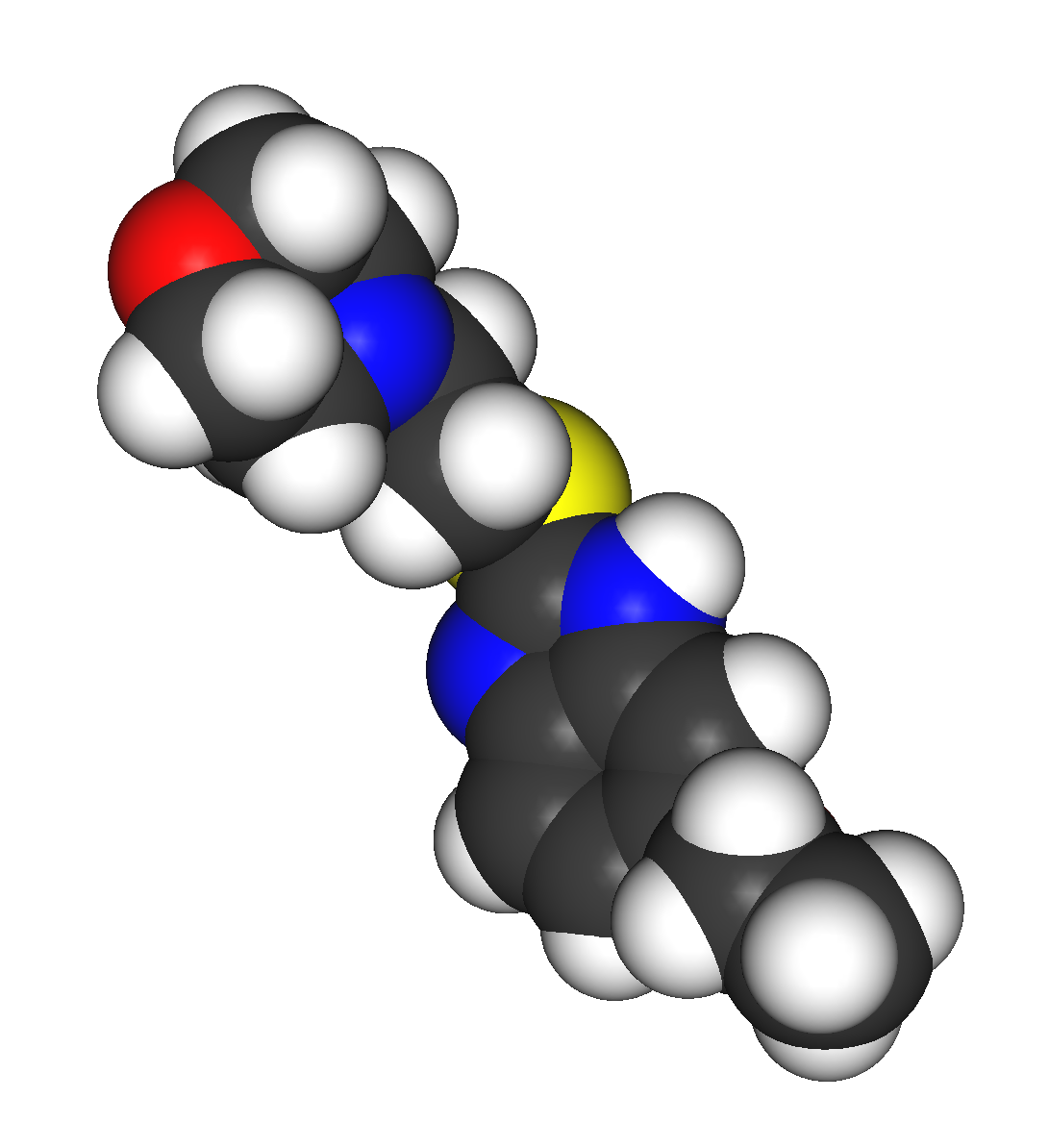

Clinical data
- Trade names: Afobazole
- Other names: Obenoxazine
- Routes of administration: Oral

Legal status
- Legal status: US: Unscheduled Not FDA approved

Pharmacokinetic data
- Bioavailability: 43.64%, pronounced first-pass effect
- Metabolism: extensive hepatic
- Onset of action: 0.85±0.13 hours
- Elimination half-life: 0.82±0.54 hours

Identifiers
- IUPAC name: 4-[2-[(6-ethoxy-1H-benzimidazol-2-yl)sulfanyl]ethyl]morpholine
- CAS Number: 173352-21-1
- PubChem CID: 9862937
- DrugBank: DB13623
- ChemSpider: 8038633
- UNII: 0F8K1X115C
- KEGG: D10561
- ChEBI: CHEBI:135309
- ChEMBL: ChEMBL3707307
- CompTox Dashboard (EPA): DTXSID00169606

Chemical and physical data
- Formula: C_{15}H_{21}N_{3}O_{2}S
- Molar mass: 307.41 g·mol^{−1}
- 3D model (JSmol): Interactive image
- SMILES: CCOc3ccc2nc(SCCN1CCOCC1)[nH]c2c3
- InChI: InChI=1S/C15H21N3O2S/c1-2-20-12-3-4-13-14(11-12)17-15(16-13)21-10-7-18-5-8-19-9-6-18/h3-4,11H,2,5-10H2,1H3,(H,16,17); Key:WWNUCVSRRUDYPP-UHFFFAOYSA-N

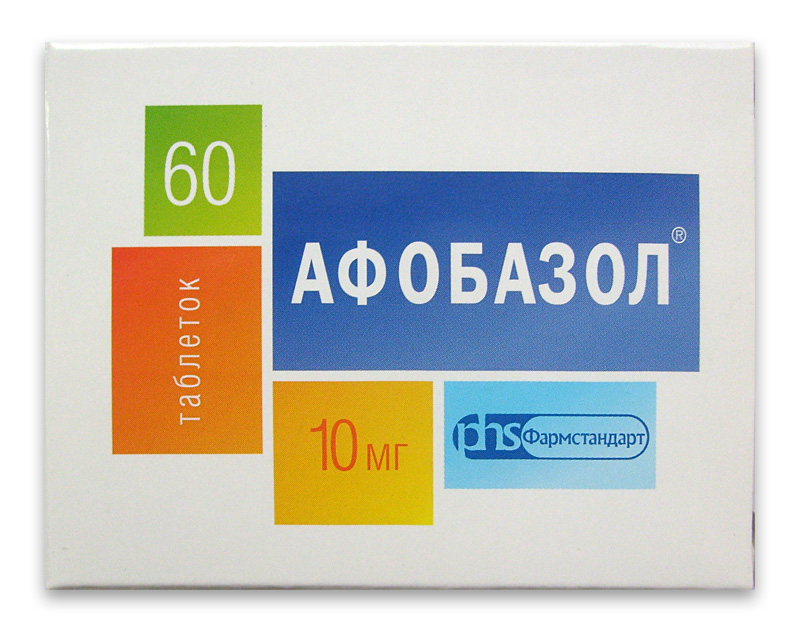
Afobazole from Russia

Fabomotizole (INN), sold under the brand name Afobazole, is an anxiolytic drug launched in Russia in the early 2000s. It produces anxiolytic and neuroprotective effects without any sedative or muscle relaxant actions. Its mechanism of action remains poorly defined however, with GABAergic, NGF- and BDNF-release-promoting, MT_{1} receptor agonism, MT_{3} receptor antagonism, and sigma agonism suggested as potential mechanisms. Fabomotizole was shown to inhibit MAO-A reversibly and may potentially have some involvement with serotonin receptors. Clinical trials have shown fabomotizole to be well tolerated and reasonably effective for the treatment of anxiety.

Experiments in mice have shown antimutagenic and antiteratogenic properties.

Experiments in rats have shown beneficial effect in the model of ischemic stroke.

Fabomotizole has found little clinical use outside Russia and has not been evaluated by the FDA.

== See also ==
- Mebicar
- Phenibut
- Selank
- Validol
- Bemethyl
- List of Russian drugs
