= Performance-enhancing substance =

Substance used to improve any form of activity performance in humans

Performance-enhancing substances (PESs), also known as performance-enhancing drugs (PEDs), are substances that are used to improve any form of activity performance in humans.

Many substances, such as anabolic steroids, can be used to improve athletic performance and build muscle, which in most cases is considered cheating by organized athletic organizations. This usage is often referred to as doping. Athletic performance-enhancing substances are sometimes referred to as ergogenic aids. Cognitive performance-enhancing drugs, commonly called nootropics, are sometimes used by students to improve academic performance. Performance-enhancing substances are also used by military personnel to enhance combat performance.

== Definition ==
The classifications of substances as performance-enhancing substances are not entirely clear-cut and objective. As in other types of categorization, certain prototype performance enhancers are universally classified as such (like anabolic steroids), whereas other substances (like vitamins and protein supplements) are virtually never classified as performance enhancers despite their effects on performance. As is usual with categorization, there are borderline cases; caffeine, for example, is considered a performance enhancer by some but not others.

== Types ==
The phrase has been used to refer to several distinct classes of drugs:

=== Anabolic steroids ===
Anabolic steroids are synthetically derived from testosterone and modified to have greater anabolic effects. They work by increasing the concentration of nitrogen in the muscle which inhibits catabolic glucocorticoid binding to muscle. This ultimately prohibits the breakdown of muscle and preserves muscle mass. Examples of anabolic steroids include oxandrolone, stanozolol and nandrolone. Anabolic steroids can be taken through a transdermal method, orally, or through injection. Injectable forms of the steroid can be (and often are) made longer-lasting than oral forms by esterifying them. In general, potential side effects can include muscle hypertrophy, acne, hypertension, elevated cholesterol, thrombosis, decreased high-density lipoproteins, altered libido, hepatic carcinoma, cholestasis, peliosis hepatitis, septic arthritis, Wilm's tumor, psychosis, aggression, addiction, and depression. Potential side effects specifically in males can include male pattern baldness, oligospermia, prostate hypertrophy, testicular atrophy, and prostate cancer. Potential side effects specifically in females can include hirsutism, uterine atrophy, amenorrhea, breast atrophy, and thickening of vocal cords (voice deepening). Urine samples are tested to determine the ratio of testosterone glucuronide to epitestosterone glucuronide, which should be 3:1. Any ratio of 4:1 or greater is considered a positive test. The Anti-Drug Abuse Act of 1988 and the Anabolic Steroid Act of 1990 both deemed anabolic steroids as an illegal substance when not used for disease treatment.

=== Stimulants ===
Stimulants improve focus and alertness. Low (therapeutic) doses of dopaminergic stimulants (e.g., reuptake inhibitors and releasing agents) also promote mental and athletic performance, as cognitive enhancers and ergogenic aids respectively, by improving muscle strength and endurance while decreasing reaction time and fatigue. Stimulants are commonly used in lengthy exercises that require short bursts (e.g., tennis, team sports, etc.). Stimulants work by increasing catecholamine levels and agonistic activity at the adrenergic receptors. Examples of stimulants include caffeine, ephedrine, methylphenidate and amphetamine. Potential side effects include hypertension, insomnia, headaches, weight loss, arrhythmia, tremors, anxiety, addiction, and strokes. Some stimulants are allowed in competitive sports and are widely accessible, though may also be monitored by the World Anti-Doping Agency (WADA), such as caffeine. Others are banned as per the WADA (e.g., cocaine, amphetamines, ephedrine, etc.).

=== Ergogenic aids ===
Ergogenic aids, or athletic performance-enhancing substances, include a number of drugs with various effects on physical performance. Drugs such as amphetamine and methylphenidate increase power output at constant levels of perceived exertion and delay the onset of fatigue, among other athletic-performance-enhancing effects; bupropion also increases power output at constant levels of perceived exertion, but only during short-term use.

==== Examples ====
- Creatine: one of the most popular nutritional supplements, it contributes to 400 million dollars in sales globally every year. It is a nonessential amino acid that helps to improve an athlete's performance during short-term, high intensity exercises such as weightlifting. Supplementation of creatine increases skeletal muscle creatine levels, boosting performance by increasing the rate at which adenosine triphosphate can be replenished from adenosine diphosphate, thereby increasing maximal power output. Potential side effects include gastrointestinal cramps, weight gain, fatigue, and diarrhea. Creatine is currently not recognized as a prohibited substance and can be purchased as a legal dietary supplement.
- β-hydroxy β-methylbutyrate, a metabolite of leucine also used as a supplement, has positive effects on lean muscle mass, possibly through a decrease in muscle catabolism.
- Human growth hormone (hGH): endogenous hormone that can help decrease fat mass while increasing lean body mass. hGH is one of the most commonly used substances among professional athletes because it has a small window for detection. It works by promoting the release of IGF-1, insulin-like growth factor, the release of which has anabolic effects on the body. Potential side effects include: cardiomyopathy, diabetes, renal failure, and hepatitis. If not prescribed by a professional, it is a banned substance in competition per WADA. Despite its small window for detection, two primary methods of testing have been developed for hGH, one being an isoform test which detects changes in growth hormone structure in the blood, and the markers test, which detects changes in serum protein ratios.

=== Adaptogens ===
Adaptogens are plants that support health through nonspecific effects, neutralize various environmental and physical stressors while being relatively safe and free of side effects. As of 2008, the position of the European Medicines Agency was that "The principle of an adaptogenic action needs further clarification and studies in the pre-clinical and clinical area." As such, the term is not accepted in pharmacological and clinical terminology that is commonly used in the EU."

=== Actoprotectors ===
Actoprotectors, or synthetic adaptogens, are compounds that enhance an organism's resilience to physical stress without increasing heat output. Actoprotectors are distinct from other doping compounds in that they increase physical and psychological resilience via non-exhaustive action. Actoprotectors such as bemethyl and bromantane have been used to prepare athletes and enhance performance in Olympic competition. However, only bromantane has been placed on the World Anti-Doping Agency's banned list.

=== Nootropics ===
Nootropics, or "cognition enhancers", are substances that are claimed to benefit overall cognition by improving memory (e.g., increasing working memory capacity or updating) or other aspects of cognitive control (e.g., inhibitory control, attentional control, attention span, etc.).

=== CNS agents ===
Central nervous system agents are medicines that affect the central nervous system (CNS).

==== Painkillers ====
Allows performance beyond the usual pain threshold. Some painkillers raise blood pressure, increasing oxygen supply to muscle cells. Painkillers used by athletes range from common over-the-counter medicines which include NSAIDs (ibuprofen) to powerful prescription narcotics.

==== Sedatives and anxiolytics ====
Sedatives and anxiolytics are used in sports like archery which require steady hands and accurate aim, and also to overcome excessive nervousness or discomfort for more dangerous sports. Diazepam, nicotine, and propranolol are common examples. Ethanol, the most commonly used substance by athletes, can be used for cardiovascular improvements though it has significant detrimental effects. Ethanol was formerly banned by WADA during performance for athletes performing in aeronautics, archery, automobile, karate, motorcycling, and powerboating but was taken off the ban list in 2017. It is detected by breath or blood testing. Cannabis is banned at all times for an athlete by WADA, though performance-enhancing effects have yet to be studied. Cannabis and nicotine are detected through urine analysis.

=== Blood boosters ===
Blood doping agents increase the oxygen-carrying capacity of blood beyond the individual's natural capacity. They are used in endurance sports like long-distance running, cycling, and Nordic skiing. Recombinant human erythropoietin (rhEPO) is one of the most widely known drugs in this class. The Athlete Biological Passport is the only indirect testing method for detection of blood doping.

==== Erythropoietin ====
Erythropoietin, or EPO, is a hormone that helps increase the production of red blood cells which increases the delivery of oxygen to muscles. It is commonly used among endurance athletes such as cyclists. It functions by protecting red blood cells against destruction whilst simultaneously stimulating bone marrow cells to produce more red blood cells. Potential side effects include: dehydration and an increase in blood viscosity which could result in a pulmonary embolism or stroke. Per the WADA, it is a banned substance. Urine samples can be tested via electrophoresis, and blood samples via indirect markers.

=== Gene doping ===
Gene doping agents are a relatively recently described class of athletic performance-enhancing substances. These drug therapies, which involve viral vector-mediated gene transfer, are not known to currently be in use as of 2020.

=== Prohormones ===
Also known as anabolic steroid precursors, they promote lean body mass. Once in the body, these precursors are converted to testosterone and increase endogenous testosterone. The desired effects of steroid precursors however, are often not seen as they do not bind well to androgen receptors. Examples of prohormones include norandrostendione, androstenediol, and dehydroepiandrosterone (DHEA). These steroids have little desired effect compared to anabolic steroids, but have the same side effects. Androstenedione in 2005 became classified as a controlled substance by WADA, however DHEA can still be obtained legally as an over-the-counter nutritional supplement.

== History ==
While the use of PEDs has expanded in recent times, the practice of using substances to improve performance has been around since the Ancient Olympic Games. In the Olympic Games of 668 BC, Charmis had consumed a diet consisting of dried figs which was thought, at the time, to be a significant factor in winning the 200-yard stade race. Ancient Greek athletes at the time also incorporated substances such as wine and brandy into their training routines. Stimulants derived from plants (e.g., Cola nitida, Bufotenin, etc.) were used by the Roman gladiators to overcome injuries and fatigue.

In the late 19th century as modern medicine and pharmacology were developing, PEDs saw an increase in use. Supplements were now exclusively being used to enhance muscular work capacity. The main substances being used included alcoholic drinks, caffeine, and mixtures created by the athletic trainers (e.g., strychnine tablets made of cocaine and brandy).

In the 20th century, testosterone was isolated and characterized by scientists. In 1941, the first record of synthesized testosterone use occurred when a horse was given testosterone which successfully improved its race performance. Sports trainers soon after began advocating for testosterone use. Images of bodybuilders with massive muscles began circulating which further perpetuated a desire among athletes to use testosterone. In 1967, the first prohibited substance list and anti-doping measures were implemented at the 1968 Olympics.

In the 1980s, the main PEDs were cortisone and anabolic steroids. The United States Congress established the Anti-Drug Abuse Act of 1988 to criminalize the distribution and possession of non-medical anabolic steroids. In 1999, WADA was formed to address the escalating use of substances in sports, particularly after the 1998 doping scandal in cycling.

== Risk factors ==
Adolescents are the most vulnerable group when it comes to taking performance-enhancing substances. This is in part due to the significance placed on physical appearance by this age group as well as feelings of invincibility combined with a lack of knowledge surrounding long-term consequences. Studies have shown that the most common gendered risk factors include being an adolescent female dissatisfied with their body weight or an adolescent male who perceives larger body sizes as the ideal. Having a negative body image or a history of depression can also be a significant risk factor. These are further exacerbated by parental pressures surrounding appearance, media influence, and peer pressure.

Studies show that adolescent males who engage with fitness magazines are twice as likely to use performance-enhancing substances. Adolescents who partake in competitive sports are at a particularly high risk, with those involved in gridiron football, basketball, wrestling, baseball, and gymnastics at the top.

== Usage in sport ==
In sports, the term performance-enhancing drugs is popularly used in reference to anabolic steroids or their precursors (hence the colloquial term steroids); anti-doping organizations apply the term broadly. Agencies such as the WADA and the United States Anti-Doping Agency try to prevent athletes from using these drugs by performing drug tests. When medical exemptions are granted they are called therapeutic use exemptions.

== See also ==
- Cosmetic pharmacology
- Ergogenic use of anabolic steroids
- List of doping cases in sport
- List of drugs used by militaries
- Natural bodybuilding
- Neuroenhancement
- Steroid use in American football
