= C14H18N2O2 =

The molecular formula C_{14}H_{18}N_{2}O_{2} may refer to:

- O-Acetylpsilocin
- O-Acetylbufotenine
- GR-196,429
- Nefiracetam
- Quinprenaline
- Sunifiram
