= C19H20N2O =

The molecular formula C_{19}H_{20}N_{2}O (molar mass: 292.382 g/mol) may refer to:

- Luzindole
- 1-Benzoyl-DMT
