= Bufothionine =

Names
- Preferred IUPAC name (7,7-dimethyl-2-aza-7-azoniatricyclo[6.3.1.0^{4,12}]dodeca-1(12),3,8,10-tetraen-9-yl) sulfate

Identifiers
CAS Number	475-39-8
3D model (JSmol)	Interactive image
PubChem CID	12302124
CompTox Dashboard (EPA)	DTXSID501317956
- InChI: InChI=1S/C12H14N2O4S/c1-14(2)6-5-8-7-13-9-3-4-10(12(14)11(8)9)18-19(15,16)17/h3-4,7,13H,5-6H2,1-2H3 Key: VANPWLVSXXJWMF-UHFFFAOYSA-N
- SMILES: C[N+]1(CCC2=CNC3=C2C1=C(C=C3)OS(=O)(=O)[O-])C

Properties
Chemical formula	C_{12}H_{14}N_{2}O_{4}S
Molar mass	282.31 g·mol^{−1}
- Except where otherwise noted, data are given for materials in their standard state (at 25 °C [77 °F], 100 kPa). Infobox references

Bufothionine is a sulfur-containing compound which is present in the parotoid gland of certain toads of the genera Bufo and Chaunus. The structure has been shown by X-ray crystallography to be (1,3,4,5-tetrahydro-5,5-dimethylpyrrolo-[4,3,2-de]quinolinio)-6-sulfate. This specific compound can be found in the skin of certain species of toad such as the Asiatic Toad, Chaunus arunco, Chaunus crucifer, Chaunus spinulosus, and Chaunus arenarum.

== Research ==
In ancient times, cinobufacini, which is extracted from the skin and the parotid venom glands of toad of the bufo genus was used to treat symptoms like swelling and pain. In the present time, cinobufacinin injections are used to achieve satisfactory effect on Hepatocellular carcinoma (HCC) in China. Bufothionine is a major active component of cinobufacini. Bufothionine has been shown to suppress growth of cancerous liver cells in vitro . In vivo, bufothionine has also been showing relieved symptoms and anti inflammatory activities in tumor bearing mice. Experiments were conducted in which cultured cancer cells were shown to have an increase in G2-M damage checkpoint, ensuring that growth of the cell will not continue until the damage to the DNA is corrected while also showing a drop in the G0 and G1 activity, which pertains to phase where there is cell growth and RNA production.

Bufothionine is shown to induce autophagy in hepatocellular carcinomas by inhibiting JAK2/STAT3 pathways, which may present possibilities of anti cancer mechanism in bufothionine through cinobufacini injections. Similarly, bufothionine has also been shown to increase the chances of cell death and decrease cell growth of gastric cancer related cells by inhibiting the PIM3 gene, which, in cancerous cells, increases the resistance of chemotherapeutic treatments.

== See also ==
- O-Methylnordehydrobufotenine
- Dehydrobufotenine
- Bufoviridine
