= MT3 =

MT3 may refer to:

- Melatonin receptor 1C
- Metallothionein-3
- Montana Highway 3
