= N-Acetylserotonin =

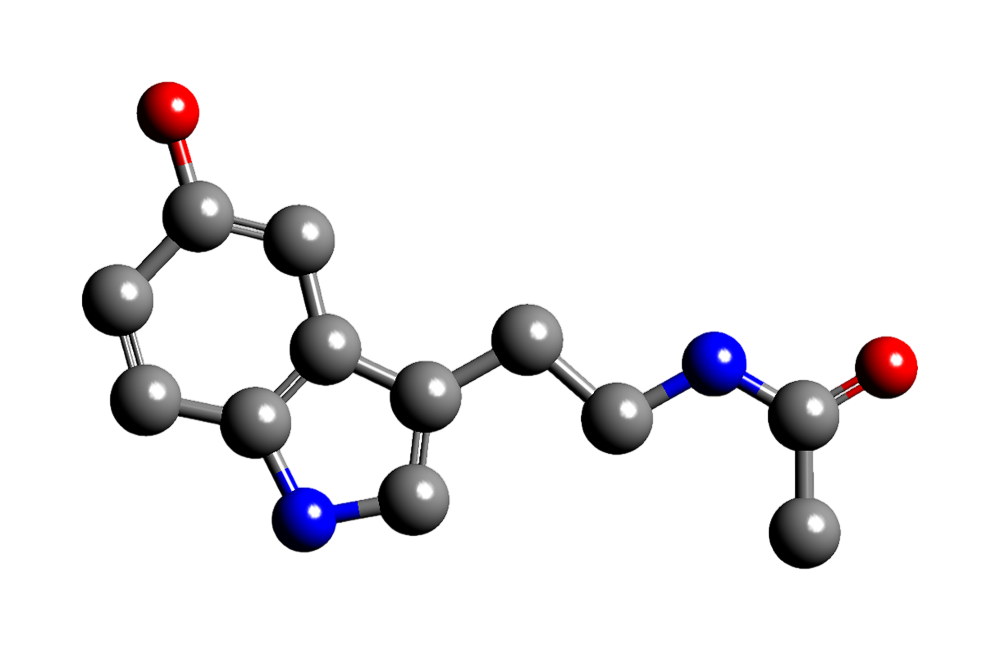

Names
- Preferred IUPAC name N-[2-(5-Hydroxy-1H-indol-3-yl)ethyl]acetamide
- Other names NAS; N-Acetyl-5-hydroxytryptamine; 5-Hydroxy-N-acetyltryptamine; N-Acetyl-5-HT; 5-HO-NAcT; 5-OH-NAcT

Identifiers
CAS Number	1210-83-9
3D model (JSmol)	Interactive image
ChEBI	CHEBI:17697
ChEMBL	ChEMBL33103
ChemSpider	879
DrugBank	DB04275
ECHA InfoCard	100.013.560
IUPHAR/BPS	5451
MeSH	N-Acetylserotonin N-Acetylserotonin
PubChem CID	903
UNII	P4TO3C82WV
CompTox Dashboard (EPA)	DTXSID00153106
- InChI: InChI=1S/C12H14N2O2/c1-8(15)13-5-4-9-7-14-12-3-2-10(16)6-11(9)12/h2-3,6-7,14,16H,4-5H2,1H3,(H,13,15) Key: MVAWJSIDNICKHF-UHFFFAOYSA-N; InChI=1/C12H14N2O2/c1-8(15)13-5-4-9-7-14-12-3-2-10(16)6-11(9)12/h2-3,6-7,14,16H,4-5H2,1H3,(H,13,15) Key: MVAWJSIDNICKHF-UHFFFAOYAX
- SMILES: CC(=O)NCCC1=CNC2=C1C=C(C=C2)O

Properties
Chemical formula	C_{12}H_{14}N_{2}O_{2}
Molar mass	218.256 g·mol^{−1}
Density	1.268 g/mL
- Except where otherwise noted, data are given for materials in their standard state (at 25 °C [77 °F], 100 kPa). verify (what is ?) Infobox references

N-Acetylserotonin (NAS), also known as normelatonin, is a naturally occurring chemical intermediate in the endogenous production of melatonin from serotonin. It also has biological activity in its own right, including acting as a melatonin receptor agonist, an agonist of the TrkB, and having antioxidant effects.

== Biological function ==
NAS binds to the melatonin receptors MT_{1}, MT_{2}, and MT_{3}, and may be a partial agonist. In addition, NAS is distributed in some areas of the brain where serotonin and melatonin are not, suggesting that it may have unique central duties of its own instead of merely functioning as a precursor in the synthesis of melatonin. NAS is known to have anti-depressant, neurotrophic and cognition-enhancing effects and has been proposed to be a target for the treatment of aging-associated cognitive decline and depression

=== TrkB receptor ===
NAS has been shown to act as a potent TrkB receptor agonist, while serotonin and melatonin do not. Subchronic and chronic administration of NAS to adult mice induces proliferation of neural progenitor cells (NPC)s, blockage of TrkB abolished this effect suggesting that it is TrkB-dependent. NAS was also found to significantly enhance NPC proliferation in sleep-deprived mice. It is thought that the anti-depressant and neurotrophic effects of NAS are in part due to its role as a TrkB agonist.

=== Antioxidant properties ===
NAS acts as a potent antioxidant, NAS effectiveness as an anti-oxidant has been found to be different depending on the experimental model used, it has been described as being between 5 and 20 times more effective than melatonin at protecting against oxidant damage. NAS has been shown to protect against lipid peroxidation in microsomes and mitochondria. NAS has also been reported to lower resting levels of ROS in peripheral blood lymphocytes and to exhibit anti-oxidant effects against t-butylated hydroperoxide- and diamide-induced ROS. NAS has also been observed to inhibit nitric oxide synthase.

=== Anti-inflammatory effects ===
NAS has been reported to have anti-inflammatory effects. NAS has been shown to inhibit LPS-stimulated production of the proinflammatory cytokine TNF-alpha in differentiated THP-1-derived human monocytes.

=== Miscellaneous ===
NAS may play a role in the antidepressant effects of selective serotonin reuptake inhibitors (SSRIs) and monoamine oxidase inhibitors (MAOIs). The SSRI fluoxetine and the MAO-A inhibitor clorgyline upregulate AANAT indirectly through serotonergic mechanisms and thereby increase NAS levels after chronic administration, and this correlates with the onset of their antidepressant effects. Furthermore, light exposure inhibits the synthesis of NAS and reduces the antidepressant effects of MAOIs. In addition, AANAT knockout mice display significantly greater immobility times versus control mice in animal models of depression. These data support a potential role for NAS in mood regulation and in antidepressant-induced therapeutic benefits.

Through a currently unidentified mechanism, NAS may be the cause of the orthostatic hypotension seen with clinical treatment of MAOIs. It reduces blood pressure in rodents, and pinealectomy (the pineal gland being a major site of NAS and melatonin synthesis) abolishes the hypotensive effects of clorgyline.

== Biochemistry ==
NAS is produced from serotonin by the enzyme aralkylamine N-acetyltransferase (AANAT) and is converted to melatonin by acetylserotonin O-methyltransferase (ASMT).

NAS is able to penetrate the blood–brain barrier, unlike serotonin.

== See also ==
- Substituted tryptamine
- Tropomyosin receptor kinase B § Agonists
- N-Acetyltryptamine
- N-Acetyldopamine
- 5-Methoxytryptamine
