= NAD(P)H quinone dehydrogenase 2 =

Protein-coding gene in the species Homo sapiens

An Error has occurred retrieving Wikidata item for infobox NAD(P)H dehydrogenase, quinone 2, also known as QR2, is a protein that in humans is encoded by the NQO2 gene. It is a phase II detoxification enzyme which can carry out two or four electron reductions of quinones. Its mechanism of reduction is through a ping-pong mechanism involving its FAD cofactor. Initially in a reductive phase NQO2 binds to reduced dihydronicotinamide riboside (NRH) electron donor, and mediates a hydride transfer from NRH to FAD. Then, in an oxidative phase, NQO2 binds to its quinone substrate and reduces the quinone to a dihydroquinone. Besides the two catalytic FAD, NQO2 also has two zinc ions. It is not clear whether the metal has a catalytic role. NQO2 is a paralog of NQO1.

NQO2 is a homodimer. NQO2 can be inhibited by resveratrol. One of QR2's binding sites responds to 2-iodomelatonin, and has been referred to as MT_{3}.
