= Emoxypine =

Chemical compound

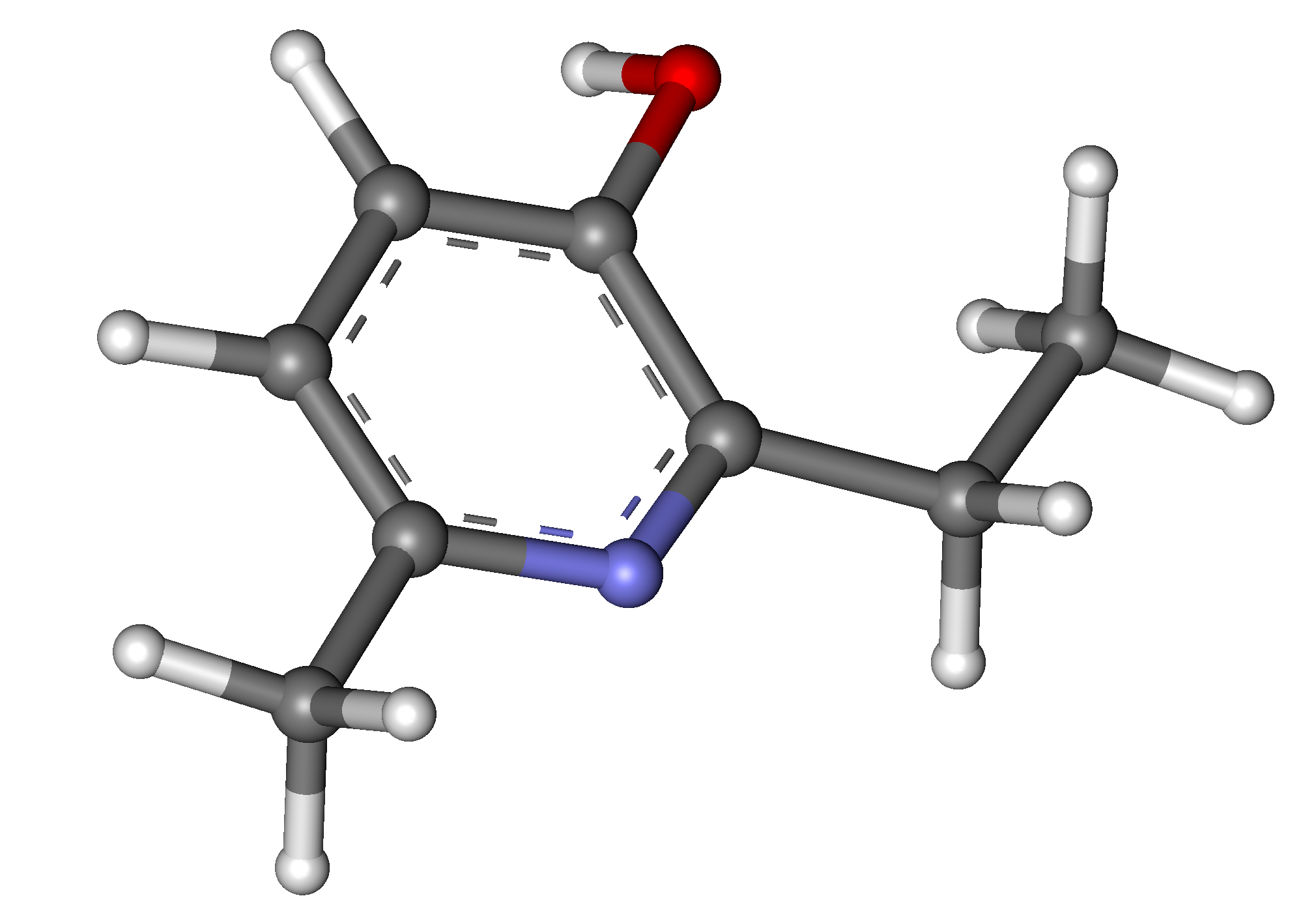

Clinical data
- Trade names: Mexidol
- Other names: Emoxipine, Emoxypin, Epigid, 6-Methyl-2-ethyl-3-hydroxypyridine
- Routes of administration: Oral, intravenous
- ATC code: none

Legal status
- Legal status: US: Unscheduled; not FDA approved; RU: Rx only

Pharmacokinetic data
- Elimination half-life: 2–2.6 hours

Identifiers
- IUPAC name: 2-Ethyl-6-methyl-3-hydroxypyridine
- CAS Number: 2364-75-2
- PubChem CID: 114681
- ChemSpider: 102688
- UNII: V247P5H4E1
- CompTox Dashboard (EPA): DTXSID40178313
- ECHA InfoCard: 100.205.098

Chemical and physical data
- Formula: C_{8}H_{11}NO
- Molar mass: 137.182 g·mol^{−1}
- 3D model (JSmol): Interactive image; Interactive image
- Melting point: 170 to 172 °C (338 to 342 °F)
- SMILES: CCc1c(ccc(n1)C)O; Oc1ccc(nc1CC)C
- InChI: InChI=1S/C8H11NO/c1-3-7-8(10)5-4-6(2)9-7/h4-5,10H,3H2,1-2H3; Key:JPGDYIGSCHWQCC-UHFFFAOYSA-N

Emoxypine (2-ethyl-6-methyl-3-hydroxypyridine), also known as Mexidol or Mexifin, a succinate salt, is chemical compound which is claimed by its manufacturer, the Russian company Pharmasoft Pharmaceuticals, to have antioxidant and actoprotector properties, but these purported properties of emoxypine have not been proven. Its chemical structure resembles that of pyridoxine (a type of vitamin B_{6}).

== Uses ==
Emoxypine is widely used in Russia, primarily for its anti-oxidant properties claimed by the manufacturer. It purportedly exercises anxiolytic, anti-stress, anti-alcohol, anticonvulsant, nootropic, neuroprotective and anti-inflammatory action. Emoxypine presumably improves cerebral blood circulation, inhibits thrombocyte aggregation, lowers cholesterol levels, has cardioprotective and antiatherosclerotic action. The compound's in vitro iron chelating property shows potential in the management of neurodegenerative conditions such as Alzheimer's disease (AD), as well as hematologic disorders.

== Mechanism of action ==
Emoxypine's mechanism of action is purported to be its antioxidant and membrane-protective effects with the following key components:

- Emoxypine inhibits oxidation of biomembrane lipids.
- Increases the activity of antioxidant enzymes, specifically that of superoxide dismutase, responsible for the formation and consumption of lipid peroxides and active oxygen forms.
- Inhibits free radicals during the synthesis of prostaglandin catalyzed cyclooxygenase and lipoxygenase, increases the correlation prostacyclin/ thromboxane A2 and blocks the leukotriene formation.
- Increases the content of polar fraction of lipids (phosphatidyl serine and phosphatidyl inositol) and reduces the cholesterol/phospholipids ratio which proves its lipid-regulatory properties; shifts structure transition into the low temperature zones, that is provokes the reduction of membrane viscosity and the increase of its fluidity, increases lipid-protein ratio.
- Modulates the activity of membrane-bound enzymes: phosphodiesterase, cyclic nucleotides, adenylate cyclase, aldoreductase, acetylcholinesterase.
- Modulates the receptor complexes of the brain membranes, i.e. benzodiazepine, GABA, acetylcholine receptors by increasing their binding ability.
- Stabilizes biomembranes, i.e. membrane structures of blood cells - erythrocytes and thrombocytes during their haemolysis or mechanical injury accompanied by the formation of free radicals.
- Changes the monoamine level and increases the dopamine content in the brain.

Still, the antioxidant and membrane-protective effects have not been proven in reviews and meta-analyses.

== History ==
Emoxypine was first synthesized by L.D. Smirnov and K.M. Dumayev, then studied and developed in the Russian Institute of Pharmacology, Russian Academy of Medical Sciences and Russian Scientific Center of Bioactive Substances Safety. Its research and use has been largely isolated to former Soviet states, with little interest from other countries.

== Clinical study ==
One non-blinded non-randomized study determined the effectiveness of emoxypine in 205 patients with clinical manifestations of lumbosacral radiculopathy (LSR). Patients were divided into two groups, and further were divided into subgroups depending on the presence of motor disturbances. All patients received a course of conventional medical treatment and physiotherapy; main group additionally received emoxypine. Thereafter, clinical-neurological control of long-term results of treatment in subgroups of patients was performed. The results showed that the use of emoxypine in the combined therapy of patients with LSR led to significant and persistent reduction of severity of pain syndrome and rapid recovery of function of spinal roots and peripheral nerves compared with conventional therapy. However, these studies are primary research, and the effectiveness or purported pharmaceutical efficiency of emoxypine has not yet been validated through a meta analysis or systematic review.

== See also ==
- List of Russian drugs
