= N-Acetyltryptamine =

Names
- IUPAC name N-[2-(1H-indol-3-yl)ethyl]acetamide
- Other names NAcT; Acetotryptamide

Identifiers
| CAS Number | 1016-47-3 |
| 3D model (JSmol) | Interactive image |
| ChEBI | CHEBI:55515 |
| ChEMBL | ChEMBL33171 |
| ChemSpider | 63717 |
| PubChem CID | 70547 |
| CompTox Dashboard (EPA) | DTXSID30144042 |
- InChI: InChI=1S/C12H14N2O/c1-9(15)13-7-6-10-8-14-12-5-3-2-4-11(10)12/h2-5,8,14H,6-7H2,1H3,(H,13,15) Key: NVUGEQAEQJTCIX-UHFFFAOYSA-N
- SMILES: CC(=O)NCCC1=CNC2=CC=CC=C21

Properties
| Chemical formula | C_{12}H_{14}N_{2}O |
| Molar mass | 202.257 g·mol^{−1} |
- Except where otherwise noted, data are given for materials in their standard state (at 25 °C [77 °F], 100 kPa). Infobox references

N-Acetyltryptamine (NAcT) is an organic compound with the molecular formula C_{12}H_{14}N_{2}O. It is a partial agonist for the melatonin receptors. N-Acetyltryptamine is produced by Streptomyces djakartensis and other Streptomyces and Fusarium species.

== See also ==
- Substituted tryptamine
- N-Acetylserotonin
- 5-Methoxytryptamine
- Melatonin
