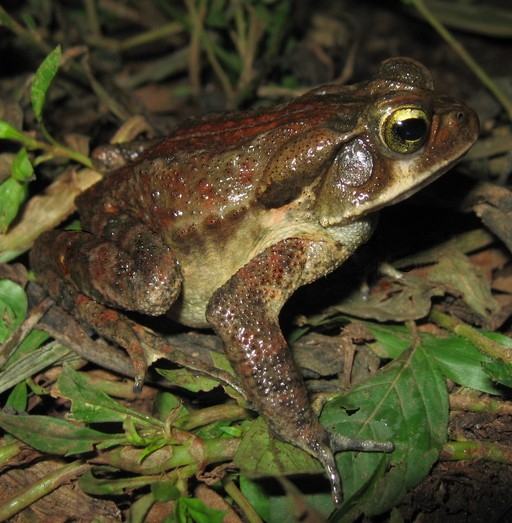

Conservation status
- Least Concern (IUCN 3.1)

Scientific classification
- Kingdom: Animalia
- Phylum: Chordata
- Class: Amphibia
- Order: Anura
- Family: Bufonidae
- Genus: Rhinella
- Species: R. ornata × R. crucifer

Synonyms
- Bufo pombali Baldissera, Caramaschi, and Haddad, 2004; Rhinella pombali (Baldissera, Caramaschi, and Haddad, 2004)

= Rhinella pombali =

Species of amphibian

Rhinella pombali is a hybrid species of toad from south-eastern Brazil, named after José Perez Pombal Jr., a Brazilian herpetologist. It was originally described in 2004 as a distinct species, but a genetic study published in 2012 found it to be a hybrid of Rhinella ornata and Rhinella crucifer; it is also morphologically intermediate between these species. It is therefore no longer considered a valid species, although it is still present in some listings.
