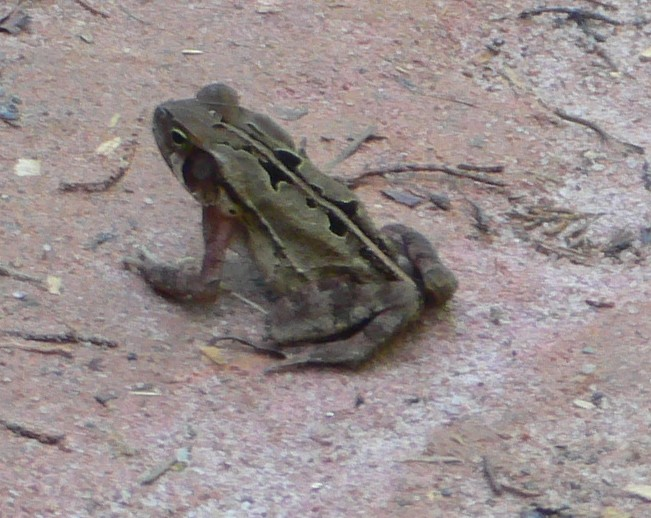

Conservation status
- Least Concern (IUCN 3.1)

Scientific classification
- Kingdom: Animalia
- Phylum: Chordata
- Class: Amphibia
- Order: Anura
- Family: Bufonidae
- Genus: Rhinella
- Species: R. crucifer

Binomial name
- Rhinella crucifer (Wied-Neuwied, 1821)

Synonyms
- Bufo crucifer Wied-Neuwied, 1821; Chaunus crucifer (Wied-Neuwied, 1821); Bufo cinctus Schinz, 1822; Bufo stellatus Spix, 1824; Bufo (Oxyrhynchus) semilineatus Spix, 1824; Bufo melanotis Duméril and Bibron, 1841; Bufo pombali Baldissera, Caramaschi, and Haddad, 2004

= Rhinella crucifer =

Species of amphibian

Rhinella crucifer is a species of toad in the family Bufonidae. It endemic to Brazil and known from the Atlantic Forest of eastern Brazil between the states of Ceará in the north and Rio de Janeiro in the south. Common name striped toad has been coined for it. "Rhinella pombali" is a hybrid between Rhinella ornata and this species.

== Description ==
Adult males measure 56–104 mm (2.2–4.1 in) and adult females 78–114 mm (3.1–4.5 in) in snout–vent length. The head is wide and the snout is rounded to mucronate in dorsal view and rounded in lateral view. The tympanum is distinct. The body is robust. The parotoid glands are elliptical to triangular and overhanging the lateral edges of body. The forelimbs are long and comparatively more robust than the hind limbs. The fingers have no webbing but are slightly fringed. The toes are long and webbed. Dorsal coloration is uniformly ochre, olive, brownish, or silvery. A thin, light vertebral line may be present.

== Habitat and conservation ==
This species occurs in rainforests and disturbed habitats at elevations up to 900 m (3,000 ft) above sea level. Reproduction takes place in backwaters of rapidly flowing streams and in temporary pools. It is a locally abundant species, but habitat loss caused by agricultural crops and timber extraction threaten its habitats. It is present in several protected areas.
