= Streptomyces djakartensis =

Scientific classification
- Domain: Bacteria
- Kingdom: Bacillati
- Phylum: Actinomycetota
- Class: Actinomycetes
- Order: Streptomycetales
- Family: Streptomycetaceae
- Genus: Streptomyces
- Species: S. djakartensis

Binomial name
- Streptomyces djakartensis Huber et al. 1962

Type strain
- AS 4.1674, ATCC 13441, CGMCC 4.1674, DSM 40743, F3463, FH 1279, IFO 15409, JCM 4957, KCC S-0957, KCTC 9722, NBRC 15409, NRRL B-12103

Species of bacterium

Streptomyces djakartensis is a bacterium species from the genus of Streptomyces which has been isolated from soil from Djakarta on Java in Indonesia. Streptomyces djakartensis produces niddamycins and N-acetyltryptamine.

== See also ==
- List of Streptomyces species
