= 2-Iodomelatonin =

Chemical compound

Identifiers
- IUPAC name: N-[2-(2-iodo-5-methoxy-1H-indol-3-yl)ethyl]acetamide
- CAS Number: 93515-00-5
- PubChem CID: 115348
- IUPHAR/BPS: 1343
- DrugBank: DB08190
- ChemSpider: 103191
- UNII: 2Q5TZ5754A
- ChEBI: CHEBI:109558
- ChEMBL: ChEMBL289233
- CompTox Dashboard (EPA): DTXSID30239462

Chemical and physical data
- Formula: C_{13}H_{15}IN_{2}O_{2}
- Molar mass: 358.179 g·mol^{−1}
- 3D model (JSmol): Interactive image
- SMILES: CC(=O)NCCC1=C(NC2=C1C=C(C=C2)OC)I
- InChI: InChI=1S/C13H15IN2O2/c1-8(17)15-6-5-10-11-7-9(18-2)3-4-12(11)16-13(10)14/h3-4,7,16H,5-6H2,1-2H3,(H,15,17); Key:FJDDSMSDZHURBJ-UHFFFAOYSA-N

2-Iodomelatonin is a melatonin analog used as a radiolabelled ligand for the melatonin receptors, MT_{1}, MT_{2}, and MT_{3}. It acts as a full agonist at both MT_{1} and MT_{2} receptors.
