= Actoprotector =

Class of chemical compounds with similar pharmacology

Actoprotectors or synthetic adaptogens are compounds that enhance an organism's resilience to physical stress without increasing heat output. Actoprotectors are distinct from other performance-enhancing substances in that they increase physical and psychological resilience via non-exhaustive action. The term "actoprotector" is used to describe synthetic and isolated compounds possessing adaptogenic properties. By contrast, the term "adaptogen" is most often use to describe a natural herb as a whole, which can contain hundreds if not thousands of biologically active components.

== Distinction from psychostimulants ==
The term actoprotector was coined to distinguish between the pharmacologically distinct mechanism of action of psychostimulant drugs (especially substituted phenethylamines) and actoprotectors. Drugs of both classes can improve resilience to stress, but actoprotectors are presumed to do so via non-exhaustive action.

For example, at least part of the action of bromantane on improving physical resiliency is mediated by upregulation of tyrosine hydroxylase, thereby indirectly increasing dopaminergic signaling in the brain. The action of amphetamine (a phenethylamine psychostimulant) on improving physical resiliency is primarily mediated by induction of dopamine and norepinephrine release from the neuronal vesicles. Clinically, it appears that the anti-asthenic effects of amphetamine quickly disappear within 24 hours of a prior dose, whereas the anti-asthenic effects of bromantane have been found to persist for at least one month after treatment cessation.

== Criteria ==
In a similar fashion to the term nootropic, the term actoprotector maintains various criteria:

1. Have minimal [direct] pharmacological activity on biological receptors.
2. Facilitate rapid recovery (by reducing central nervous system fatigue).
3. Most effective in individuals with low to moderate baseline resilience to stress.
4. Involve a complexity of biochemical processes.
5. Decrease entropy of an organism (lowering oxygen consumption, body temperature, heart rate, etc).
6. Possess efficacy that is independent of extreme conditions.
7. Possess the ability to modify the pathology of pathogenic therapy agents.

== Chemical structure ==
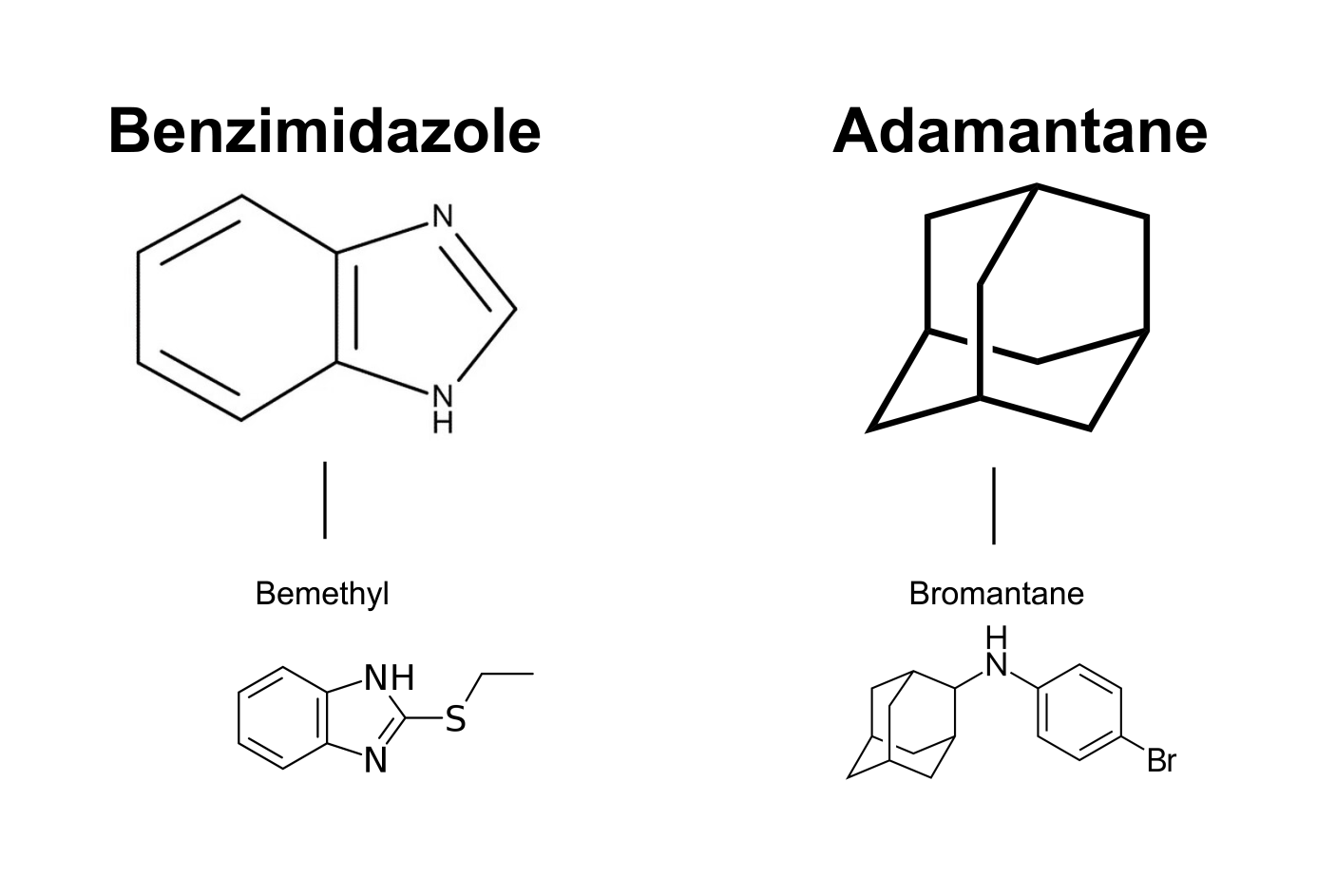

Most actoprotectors fall into several groups depending on their chemical structure:

- Benzimidazole derivatives such as bemitil
- Adamantane derivatives such as bromantane
- Thiazoloindole derivatives
- Succinic acid and 3-hydroxypridine derivatives such as mexidol

== List of actoprotectors ==
- Bromantane
- Memantine
- Bemitil

== See also ==
- List of Russian drugs
