= Bufoviridine =

Names
- IUPAC name [3-[2-(dimethylamino)ethyl]-1H-indol-5-yl] hydrogen sulfate
- Other names Bufotenine O-sulfate; Dihydrobufothionine; 5-Sulfooxy-N,N-dimethyltryptamine; 5-Sulfooxy-DMT; 5-SO-DMT

Identifiers
CAS Number	16369-08-7
3D model (JSmol)	Interactive image
ChemSpider	103872590
PubChem CID	155770250
UNII	VG86FV7HXK
CompTox Dashboard (EPA)	DTXSID701171926
- InChI: InChI=1S/C12H16N2O4S/c1-14(2)6-5-9-8-13-12-4-3-10(7-11(9)12)18-19(15,16)17/h3-4,7-8,13H,5-6H2,1-2H3,(H,15,16,17) Key: OYOOWLVMRZQOMJ-UHFFFAOYSA-N
- SMILES: CN(C)CCC1=CNC2=C1C=C(C=C2)OS(=O)(=O)O

Properties
Chemical formula	C_{12}H_{16}N_{2}O_{4}S
Molar mass	284.33 g/mol
- Except where otherwise noted, data are given for materials in their standard state (at 25 °C [77 °F], 100 kPa). Infobox references

Bufoviridine, also known as bufotenine O-sulfate, dihydrobufothionine, or 5-sulfooxy-N,N-dimethyltryptamine (5-sulfooxy-DMT or 5-SO-DMT), is a naturally occurring tryptamine found in Bufo species such as Bufo viridis and Bufo calamita. It is the O-sulfate ester of bufotenin (5-HO-DMT). The compound shows very weak serotonergic activity. Bufoviridine is not known to have been evaluated in humans, but is suggested to be inactive based on animal studies. The 4-O-acetate, 4-O-phosphate, and 4-O-benzoate esters of psilocin (4-HO-DMT) are all active, but the 4-O-sulfate ester is inactive, suggesting that bufoviridine may be inactive as well. It was first described in the 1950s.

== See also ==
- Substituted tryptamine
- Bufotenin
- Bufotenidine
- Bufothionine
- O-Acetylbufotenine
- O-Pivalylbufotenine
