= Dehydrobufotenine =

Clinical data
- Other names: Dehydrobufotenin
- ATC code: None

Identifiers
- IUPAC name: 7,7-dimethyl-2-aza-7-azoniatricyclo[6.3.1.0^{4,12}]dodeca-1(12),3,8,10-tetraen-9-olate
- CAS Number: 17232-69-8
- PubChem CID: 5316436
- ChemSpider: 4475493

Chemical and physical data
- Formula: C_{12}H_{14}N_{2}O
- Molar mass: 202.257 g·mol^{−1}
- 3D model (JSmol): Interactive image
- SMILES: C[N+]1(CCC2=CNC3=C2C1=C(C=C3)[O-])C
- InChI: InChI=1S/C12H14N2O/c1-14(2)6-5-8-7-13-9-3-4-10(15)12(14)11(8)9/h3-4,7,13H,5-6H2,1-2H3; Key:XRZDSPVDZKCARG-UHFFFAOYSA-N

Dehydrobufotenine is a cyclized tryptamine alkaloid related to bufotenin which is found in several toads and plants. It was first described in the scientific literature in the 1940s.

== See also ==
- Cyclized tryptamine
- O-Methylnordehydrobufotenine
- Bufothionine (the sulfated version)
