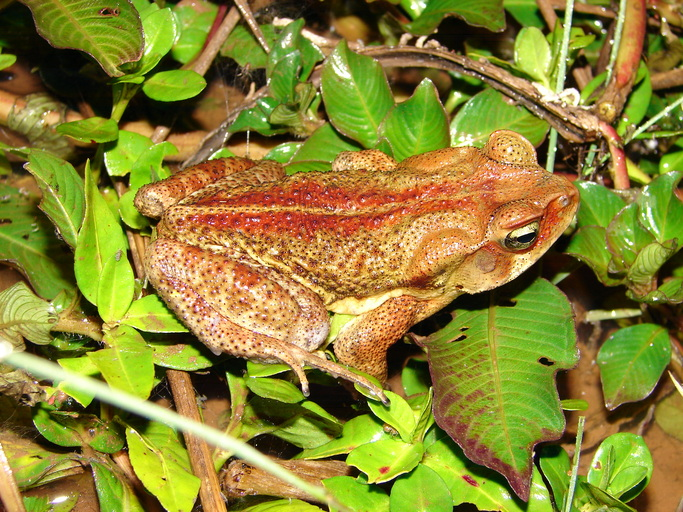

Conservation status
- Least Concern (IUCN 3.1)

Scientific classification
- Kingdom: Animalia
- Phylum: Chordata
- Class: Amphibia
- Order: Anura
- Family: Bufonidae
- Genus: Rhinella
- Species: R. ornata

Binomial name
- Rhinella ornata (Spix, 1824)

Synonyms
- Bufo ornatus; Rhinella ornatus

= Rhinella ornata =

Species of Amphibia

Rhinella ornata is a species of toad in the family Bufonidae that is found in Brazil and possibly Argentina. Its natural habitats are subtropical or tropical moist lowland forests, rivers, and intermittent freshwater lakes. It is threatened by habitat loss.

Rhinella ornata will mate with a sister species, Rhinella crucifer, to form the hybrid species Rhinella pombali.
