= GR-196,429 =

Chemical compound

Identifiers
- IUPAC name: N-[2-(2,3,7,8-tetrahydrofuro[2,3-g]indol-1-yl)ethyl]acetamide
- CAS Number: 170729-12-1
- PubChem CID: 5311134
- IUPHAR/BPS: 1349
- ChemSpider: 4470661
- CompTox Dashboard (EPA): DTXSID401030521

Chemical and physical data
- Formula: C_{14}H_{18}N_{2}O_{2}
- Molar mass: 246.310 g·mol^{−1}
- 3D model (JSmol): Interactive image
- SMILES: c23c1CCOc1ccc2CCN3CCNC(=O)C
- InChI: InChI=1S/C14H18N2O2/c1-10(17)15-6-8-16-7-4-11-2-3-13-12(14(11)16)5-9-18-13/h2-3H,4-9H2,1H3,(H,15,17); Key:LTYWTNUOUBBVNZ-UHFFFAOYSA-N

GR-196,429 is a melatonin receptor agonist with some selectivity for the MT_{1} subtype. It was one of the first synthetic melatonin agonists developed and continues to be used in scientific research, though it has never been developed for medical use. Studies in mice have shown GR-196,429 to produce both sleep-promoting effects and alterations of circadian rhythm, as well as stimulating melatonin release.
