= O-Methylnordehydrobufotenine =

Clinical data
- Other names: O-Methyldehydrobufotenidine; 6-Methoxy-5-methyl-1,2,3,4,5-tetrahydropyrrolo[4,3,2-d,e]-quinoline
- ATC code: None

Identifiers
- IUPAC name: 9-methoxy-7-methyl-2,7-diazatricyclo[6.3.1.04,12]dodeca-1(12),3,8,10-tetraene
- PubChem CID: 11074453
- ChemSpider: 9249602

Chemical and physical data
- Formula: C_{12}H_{14}N_{2}O
- Molar mass: 202.257 g·mol^{−1}
- 3D model (JSmol): Interactive image
- SMILES: CN1CCC2=CNC3=C2C1=C(C=C3)OC
- InChI: InChI=1S/C12H14N2O/c1-14-6-5-8-7-13-9-3-4-10(15-2)12(14)11(8)9/h3-4,7,13H,5-6H2,1-2H3; Key:PRPCWBYVLURNKE-UHFFFAOYSA-N

O-Methylnordehydrobufotenine, also known as O-methyldehydrobufotenidine or as 6-methoxy-5-methyl-1,2,3,4,5-tetrahydropyrrolo[4,3,2-d,e]-quinoline, is a tricyclic cyclized tryptamine and analogue of 5-MeO-DMT and bufotenine. It produces hallucinogen-like effects in monkeys and rodents. However, although more potent than mescaline, O-methylnordehydrobufotenine was far less active than its open-chain analogue 5-MeO-DMT. The drug is not known to have been tested in humans. O-Methylnordehydrobufotenine was first described in the scientific literature by 1969.

== See also ==
- Substituted tryptamine § Cyclized tryptamines
- Bufothionine
- Dehydrobufotenine
- FHATHBIN
