= Acetylserotonin O-methyltransferase =

Mammalian protein found in humans

ASMT
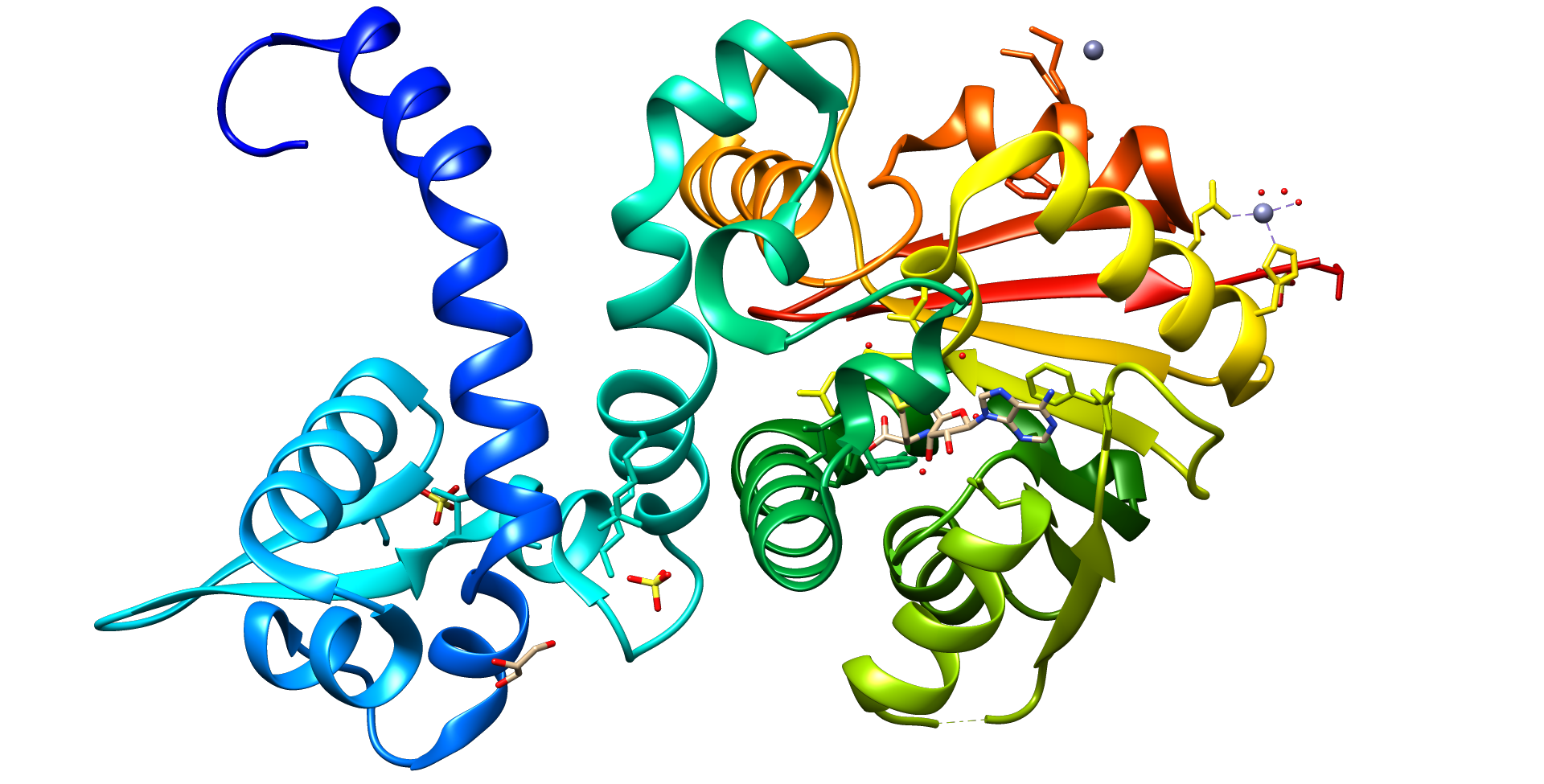

Identifiers
- Aliases: ASMT, ASMTY, HIOMT, HIOMTY, acetylserotonin O-methyltransferase
- External IDs: OMIM: 402500, 300015; MGI: 96090; GeneCards: ASMT
Available structures
PDB	Ortholog search: PDBe RCSB
PDB	List of PDB id codes 4A6D, 4A6E
Enzyme activity
EC #	BRENDA	ExPASy	KEGG	MetaCyc
2.1.1.4	↗	↗	↗	↗

Gene location (Human)
Chr.	X chromosome (human)
Band	X;Y	Start	1,615,059 bp
Band	X;Y	End	1,643,081 bp

Gene location (Mouse)
Chr.	X chromosome (mouse)
Band	X F5|X	Start	169,106,356 bp
Band	X F5|X	End	169,111,844 bp
RNA expression pattern
Bgee	Human / Mouse (ortholog); Top expressed in: testicle; anterior pituitary; oocyte; bone marrow; sural nerve; olfactory zone of nasal mucosa; canal of the cervix; ectocervix; left uterine tube; body of uterus / n/a; More reference expression data
BioGPS	n/a
Gene ontology
Molecular function	methyltransferase activity; transferase activity; protein homodimerization activity; O-methyltransferase activity; acetylserotonin O-methyltransferase activity; identical protein binding; S-methyltransferase activity; S-adenosylmethionine-dependent methyltransferase activity
Cellular component	cytosol
Biological process	melatonin biosynthetic process; methylation; protein biosynthesis; indolalkylamine biosynthetic process; aromatic compound biosynthetic process
Sources:Amigo / QuickGO
Orthologs
Databases	NCBI: entry; OMA: entry
Species	Human	Mouse
Entrez	438	107626
Ensembl	ENSG00000196433	ENSMUSG00000093806
UniProt	P46597	D3KU66
RefSeq (mRNA)	NM_004043; NM_001171038; NM_001171039	NM_001199212; NM_001308488
RefSeq (protein)	NP_001164509; NP_001164510; NP_004034	NP_001186141; NP_001295417
Location (UCSC)	Chr X: 1.62 – 1.64 Mb	Chr X: 169.11 – 169.11 Mb
PubMed search
- Wikidata
View/Edit Human	View/Edit Mouse

acetylserotonin O-methyltransferase

Identifiers
- EC no.: 2.1.1.4
- CAS no.: 9029-77-0

Databases
- BRENDA: enzyme data
- ExPASy: NiceZyme view
- KEGG: enzyme entry
- MetaCyc: metabolic pathway
- Rhea: reactions
- PDB structures: RCSB PDB PDBe PDBsum
- Gene Ontology: AmiGO / QuickGO
Search
- PMC: articles
- PubMed: articles
- NCBI: proteins

N-Acetylserotonin O-methyltransferase, also known as ASMT, is an enzyme which catalyzes the final reaction in melatonin biosynthesis: converting Normelatonin to melatonin. This reaction is embedded in the more general tryptophan metabolism pathway. The enzyme also catalyzes a second reaction in tryptophan metabolism: the conversion of 5-hydroxy-indoleacetate to 5-methoxy-indoleacetate. The other enzyme which catalyzes this reaction is N-acetylserotonin-o-methyltransferase-like-protein.

== Synonyms ==
Synonyms of N- Acetylserotonin O-methyltransferase are Hydroxyindole O-methyltransferase (HIOMT), Acetylserotonin O-methyltransferase (ASMT), Acetylserotonin N-methyltransferase, Acetylserotonin methyltransferase (Y chromosome). The most commonly used synonym is Hydroxyindole O-methyltransferase (HIOMT).

== Species distribution ==
N- Acetylserotonin O-methyltransferase is found in both prokaryotes and eukaryotes. It is found in the bacteria Rhodopirellula baltica and Chromobacterium violaceum. It is also found in the following eukaryotes: Gallus gallus (chicken), Bos taurus (cow), Homo sapiens (human), Macaca mulatta (rhesus monkey), and Rattus norvegicus (rat).

== Tissue distribution ==
Recent studies found messenger RNA (mRNA) transcripts of the HOIMT gene in B lymphocytes, T helper lymphocytes, cytoxic T lymphocytes, and natural killer lymphocytes in humans. This finding, in conjunction with research on alternative splicing of the HOIMT hnRNA, suggests that Hydroxyindole O-methyltransferase (synonym for N- Acetylserotonin O-methyltransferase) plays a role in the human immune system, in addition to its endocrine and nervous system functions. In other words, the gene may be expressed in various isoforms in different cells of the body.

== Gene ==
N-Acetylserotonin O-methyltransferase is an enzyme that is coded for by genes located on the pseudoautosomal region of the X and Y chromosome, and is most abundantly found in the pineal gland and retina of humans.

The human HOIMT gene is approximately 35 kb in length and contains 9-10 exons. The gene can be alternatively spliced to form at least three possible isoforms, although each of these isoforms has the same role in the biosynthesis of melatonin. It has also been found that the gene contains multiple promoter regions, an indication that multiple mechanisms of regulation exist.

In humans the ASMT enzyme is encoded by the pseudoautosomal ASMT gene. A copy exists near the endcaps of the short arms of both the X chromosome and the Y chromosome.

== Structure ==
N-Acetylserotonin O-methyltransferase (ASMT) adopts the canonical SAM-dependent methyltransferase architecture in its C-terminal catalytic domain, where a seven-stranded β-sheet flanked by α-helices forms the S-adenosyl-L-methionine (SAM) binding pocket and catalytic site characteristic of class I (Rossmann-like) methyltransferases. ASMT functions as a homodimer, with the predominantly helical N-terminal domains of two monomers intertwining to stabilize the quaternary structure and contribute to proper active-site geometry. In the human X-ray structure, the substrate-binding pocket positions the 5-hydroxy group of N-acetylserotonin for nucleophilic attack on the SAM-derived methyl group, while conserved residues coordinate SAM or S-adenosyl-L-homocysteine (SAH) and interact with the indole ring to enforce regioselective O-methyl transfer.

The structure of N- Acetylserotonin O-methyltransferase has been determined by X-ray diffraction.

== Function ==
N-Acetylserotonin O-methyltransferase can be classified under three types of enzyme functional groups: transferases, one-carbon group transferrers, and methyltransferases.

It catalyzes two reactions in the tryptophan metabolism pathway, and both can be traced back to serotonin. Serotonin has many fates in this pathway, and N- Acetylserotonin O-methyltransferase catalyzes reactions in two of these fates. The enzyme has been studied most for its catalysis of the final step of the pathway from serotonin to melatonin, but it also catalyzes one of the reactions in the many step process of serotonin → 5-Methoxy-indolacetate.

== Reactions catalyzed ==
In one metabolic pathway from tryptophan, N-Acetylserotonin O-methyltransferase catalyzes two separate reactions. The first is the reaction of N-acetylserotonin to melatonin. S-adenosyl-L-methionine (SAM) is used as the source of the methyl group and is converted to S-adenosyl-L-homocysteine (SAH).

N-Acetylserotonin
+ SAM
Melatonin
+ SAH

The second reaction catalyzed by the enzyme is later in the pathway, after serotonin has been metabolised to 5-hydroxyindoleacetic acid. This is further converted to 5-methoxyindoleacetate, with the same SAM cofactor.

5-Hydroxyindoleacetic acid
+ SAM
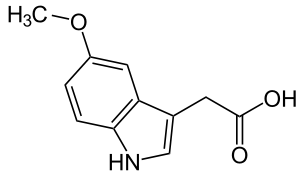
5-Methoxyindoleacetic acid
+ SAH

== Clinical significance ==
=== Cancer ===
There is evidence of high HIOMT gene expression in pineal parenchymal tumors (PPTs). This finding has led to the study of varying gene expression as a diagnostic marker for such tumors. Abnormally high levels of HIOMT in these glands could serve as an indication of the existence of PPTs in the brain.

=== Psychiatric disorders ===
Melatonin levels are used as a trait marker for mood disorders, meaning that abnormal levels of melatonin can be used in conjunction with other diagnostic criteria to determine whether a mood disorder (e.g. Seasonal affective disorder, bipolar disorder, or major depressive disorder) exists. Melatonin levels can also be used as a state marker, contributing to conclusions on the severity of a patient's illness at a given point in time. Because studies have shown a direct correlation between the amount of hydroxyindole-O-methyltransferase in the pineal gland and the melatonin level, additional knowledge of HIOMT could provide valuable insight on the nature and onset of these impairing disorders.

=== Developmental disorders ===
Subjects with autism were found to have significantly lower levels of melatonin and acetylserotonin O-methyltransferase (ASMT) than controls.

=== Linkage analysis ===
High frequency polymorphism exists on the PAR region of the sex chromosomes, where the HIOMT gene is located. Linkage analysis of a diseased locus with high frequency polymorphism of this region could lead to vital information about the role of this gene in genetic disorders.

== Research ==
HIOMT as the limiting reagent in the melatonin biosynthetic pathway

There has been some controversy over the regulatory power of hydroxyindole-O-methyltransferase in the production of melatonin. In 2001, it was argued that another enzyme in the pathway, N-acetyl transferase (NAT) was the limiting reagent in the production of melatonin. Recent findings, however, have suggested that HIOMT, not NAT, is the limiting reagent, and a direct correlation between HIOMT expression and melatonin levels has been shown to exist.

== See also ==
- Methyltransferase
