= Luzindole =

Chemical compound

Clinical data
- Other names: N-0774, N-acetyl-2-benzyltryptamine
- ATC code: None

Legal status
- Legal status: In general: uncontrolled

Identifiers
- IUPAC name: N-[2-(2-benzyl-1H-indol-3-yl)ethyl]acetamide
- CAS Number: 117946-91-5
- PubChem CID: 122162
- ChemSpider: 108959
- UNII: B31Y10A9UR
- ChEBI: CHEBI:131788
- CompTox Dashboard (EPA): DTXSID40151969

Chemical and physical data
- Formula: C_{19}H_{20}N_{2}O
- Molar mass: 292.382 g·mol^{−1}
- 3D model (JSmol): Interactive image
- SMILES: O=C(NCCc2c1ccccc1[nH]c2Cc3ccccc3)C
- InChI: InChI=1S/C19H20N2O/c1-14(22)20-12-11-17-16-9-5-6-10-18(16)21-19(17)13-15-7-3-2-4-8-15/h2-10,21H,11-13H2,1H3,(H,20,22); Key:WVVXBPKOIZGVNS-UHFFFAOYSA-N

Luzindole (N-0774; N-acetyl-2-benzyltryptamine), is a drug used in scientific research to study the role of melatonin in the body. Luzindole acts as a selective melatonin receptor antagonist, with approximately 11- to 25-fold greater affinity for the MT_{2} over the MT_{1} receptor. In animal studies, it has been observed to disrupt the circadian rhythm as well as produce antidepressant effects.

== Synthesis ==
Although the "hydrogen bomb" method was reported as 54% yield by Dubococvich, Boehringer Sohn achieved 96% for this step. The difference is that B.I. conducted their hydrogenation under normal pressure at 50°C for 5 hours, whereas Dubocovich conducted theirs at 100 lbs/in2 hydrogen heated to 35°C. This proves that the hydrogenation step proceeds favorably under milder conditions.

Patents:

The Pictet–Spengler reaction between tryptamine [61-54-1] (1) and benzaldehyde gives 1-Phenyl-tetrahydrocarboline [3790-45-2] (2). Catalytic hydrogenation leads to 2-Benzyltryptamine [22294-23-1] (3). Acylation with acetic anhydride only gave 21% yield of Luzindole (4).

Luzindole synthesis 2:

2-iodoaniline [615-43-0] (1) Propargylbenzene [10147-11-2] (2) 2-(3-phenylprop-1-ynyl)aniline, PC85868179 (3) 2-benzylindole [3377-72-8] (4) 1-Dimethylamino-2-nitroethylene [1190-92-7] (5) (6)

One pot Luzindole synthesis:
