= Glucosamine-phosphate N-acetyltransferase =

Glucosamine 6-phosphate N-acetyltransferase
- Glucosamine 6-phosphate N-acetyltransferase 1, homodimer, Human

Identifiers
- EC no.: 2.3.1.4
- CAS no.: 9031-91-8

Databases
- IntEnz: IntEnz view
- BRENDA: BRENDA entry
- ExPASy: NiceZyme view
- KEGG: KEGG entry
- MetaCyc: metabolic pathway
- PRIAM: profile
- PDB structures: RCSB PDB PDBe PDBsum
- Gene Ontology: AmiGO / QuickGO
Search
- PMC: articles
- PubMed: articles
- NCBI: proteins

Glucosamine-phosphate N-acetyltransferase (GNA) (EC 2.3.1.4) is an enzyme that catalyzes the transfer of an acetyl group from acetyl-CoA to the primary amine in glucosamide-6-phosphate:

glucosamine 6-phosphate
+
acetyl-CoA
N-acetyl-glucosamine 6-phosphate
+ coenzyme A

The enzyme belongs to the family of transferases, a group of enzymes that transfers a specific functional group, in this case acetyl, from a donor to a receptor. It is an acyltransferase, since it involves the transfer of a general acyl group with a methyl as the substituent.

== Nomenclature ==
The systematic name of this enzyme class is acetyl-CoA:D-glucosamine-6-phosphate N-acetyltransferase. Other names in common use include phosphoglucosamine transacetylase, phosphoglucosamine acetylase, glucosamine-6-phosphate acetylase, D-glucosamine-6-P N-acetyltransferase, aminodeoxyglucosephosphate acetyltransferase, glucosamine 6-phosphate acetylase, glucosamine 6-phosphate N-acetyltransferase, N-acetylglucosamine-6-phosphate synthase, phosphoglucosamine N-acetylase, glucosamine-phosphate N-acetyltransferase, and glucosamine-6-phosphate N-acetyltransferase.

== Function ==
This enzyme is part of the hexosamine biosynthesis pathway (HBP), which is one of the glucose processing pathways in the general metabolism. This pathway shares the initial two steps with glycolysis and diverges only a small portion of glucose flux from this more traditional glycolytic pathway. Therefore, it is favored when there is negative feedback regulation on glycolysis, as in the case of large amounts of free fatty acids. The end product of this pathway is UDP-N-Acetylglucosamine, which is involved in the modification of complex molecules such as glycolipids, proteoglycans and glycoproteins. This end product acts as a carrier of N-Acetylglucosamine, which is the monomeric unit of chitin, a structural polymer that composes the shells of crustaceans and insects, as well as the cell wall of fungi. Furthermore, N-Acetylglucosamine is also a unit of the peptidoglycan polymer that composes the bacteria cell wall along with N-acetylmuramic disaccharide.

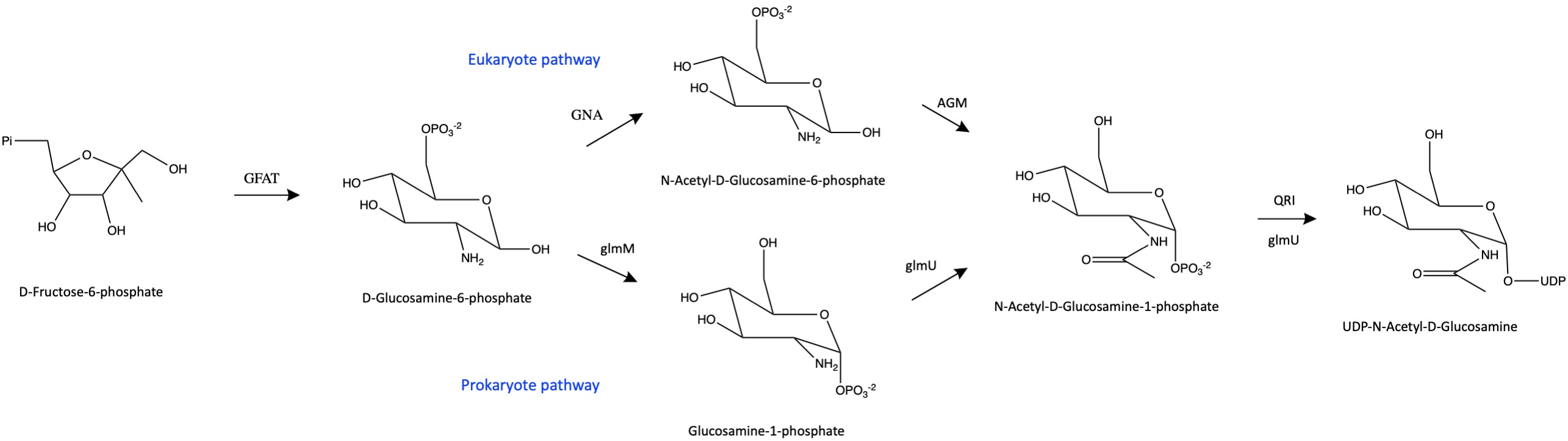
Figure 1: As shown in the picture, there are two possible pathways to produce UDP-N-Acetyl-D-Glucosamide from D-Fructose-6-phosphate. In eukaryotes, GNA is present and the acetylation occurs before the phosphate transfer from the 6-carbon to the 1-carbon. In prokaryotes, the order is inverted, and the acylation substrate is rather D-Glucosamide-1-phosphate, and a single enzyme catalyzes both the carbon transfer as well as the UTP binding, generating directly UDP-GlcNAc (UDP-N-Acetyl-D-Glucosamide). Picture reproduced from.

More specifically, the GNA enzyme catalyzes the fourth step of the HBP pathway in eukaryotes, promoting a carbon transfer from Acetyl-CoA to the other substrate, D-Glucosamine-6-phosphate which will finally yield UDP-N-Acetylglucosamine. This is a small, but an important chemical step that is crucial to the properties of the sub-products of this metabolic pathway. The acetylation is carried out until the very end product of the hexamine pathway, and is very characteristic of the polymers formed with N-Acetylglucosamine. For instance, it constitutes one of the main difference in the molecular structure of chitin and cellulose, and explains many of the physical and chemical properties of these polymers. In the case of chitin, for example, computational studies have found that the acylation contributes to the formation of hydrogen bonds that stabilize the crystalline structure of this polymer, providing greater resistance to fracture.

Nevertheless, in prokaryotic metabolism, the hexosamine biosynthesis pathway follows a different reaction step, in which a different enzyme acts upon the same characteristic substrates (Figure 1). In prokaryotes, the phosphate transfer from the 6-carbon to the 1-carbon takes place before the acylation, such that the substrate of carbon-adding reaction is Glucosamine-1-phosphate rather than D-glucosamine-6-phosphate. This time, the enzyme responsible for the acetylation is the bifunctional protein glmU (N-Acetylglucosamine-1-phosphate uridyltransferase), that also catalyzes the addition of UDP to the phosphate group on N-Acetyl-D-Glucosamine-1-Phosphate.

In humans, glucosamine-phosphate N-acetyltransferase is a dimer with two identical subunits, and is encoded in the gene GNPNAT (HGNC Symbol). More specifically, the enzyme is strongly expressed in the liver, stomach and gastrointestinal tract tissues, and within the cell, it is located in endosomes and in the Golgi apparatus (by manual annotation).

== Mechanism ==
Scheme showing the reaction catalyzed by Glucosamine-6-phosphate N-acetyltransferase, showing acyl group in blue transferred from Acetyl CoA to the hexosamine Glucosamine-6-phosphate.

The molecular structure of the reaction catalyzed by GNA is shown below, with the transferred acetyl group in blue.

The general reaction mechanism postulated for protein N-end acetylation (inspired by lysine acetylation mechanism) with Acetyl-CoA involves a nucleophilic attack of the amino group (in this case from D-Glucosamine-6-phosphate) on the terminal carbonyl in the carbon transfer, leading to the formation of a carbon tetrahedral intermediate. The reaction proceeds with the restoration of the carbonyl by removing the CoA as a leaving group, such that now the acetyl group is connected to the amino group in the other substrate.

Specifically for this N-acetyltransferase catalysts, studies with S. cerevisiae GNA enzyme have shown that some specific amino acids contribute to substrate binding, increased nucleophilicity of the amino group and finally catalysis, which supports the postulated mechanism described above. Glu98, Asp99, and Ile100 polarize the carbonyl bond in the Acetyl-CoA, increasing the carbon electrophilicity as well as stabilizing the carbon tetrahedral intermediate. Tyr143 is responsible for stabilizing the thiolate anion, favoring the S-CoA as a leaving group from the tetrahedral carbon. Finally, Asp134 enhances the nucleophilicity of the amino group in D-Glucosamide-6-phosphate by donating electron density to the nitrogen atom. In a different organism, C. albicans, a similar set of amino acids were found to be essential to the catalytic activity, respectively the Glu88-Asp-89-Ile90 system, Asp125 and Tyr133.

== Structure ==
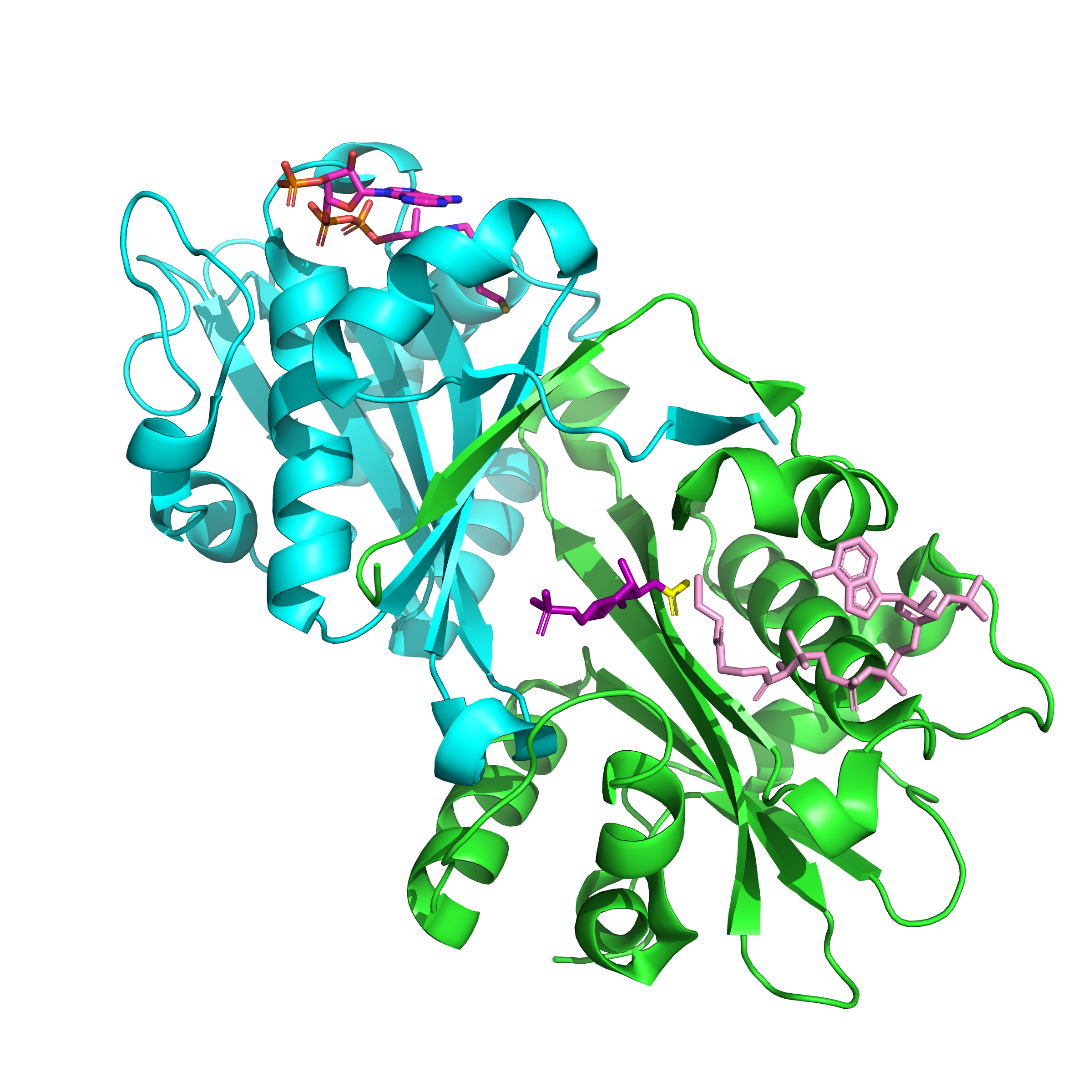
Figure 3: Crystal Structure of GNA attached to substrates. Structure from Protein Data Base

As of late 2019, 13 structures have been solved for this class of enzymes in different species, with PDB access codes 1I12 (Saccharomyces cerevisiae), 1I1D (Saccharomyces cerevisiae), 1I21 (Saccharomyces cerevisiae), 2HUZ (Homo sapiens), 2O28 (Homo sapiens), 4AG7 (Caenorhabditis elegans), among others.

Figure 3 shows the proposed crystal structure of GNA in humans, with each catalytic subunit in a different color. The Acetyl-CoA bounded to the enzyme is shown in light pink, and the product still bound to the catalytic site is shown in purple. The transferred acetyl group in the N-acetyl-D-glucosamine-6-phosphate product in purple is shown in yellow. This proposed 3d structure of the protein shows that the specific parts of the substrates involved in this reaction - the terminal end of the linear portion of Acetyl-CoA and the nitrogen group attached to the glucosamine ring - are in great proximity.
