= Menthyl isovalerate =

Names
- IUPAC name (1R,3R,4S)-p-Menthan-3-yl 3-methylbutanoate
- Systematic IUPAC name (1R,2S,5R)-5-Methyl-2-(propan-2-yl)cyclohexyl 3-methylbutanoate
- Other names Validolum; Valofin; Validol; Menthoval

Identifiers
CAS Number	28221-20-7
3D model (JSmol)	Interactive image
ChemSpider	107053
ECHA InfoCard	100.036.766
PubChem CID	119900
UNII	P5M0O284O6
CompTox Dashboard (EPA)	DTXSID00861678
- InChI: InChI=1S/C15H28O2/c1-10(2)8-15(16)17-14-9-12(5)6-7-13(14)11(3)4/h10-14H,6-9H2,1-5H3/t12-,13+,14-/m1/s1 Key: VYQSSWZYPCCBRN-HZSPNIEDSA-N; InChI=1/C15H28O2/c1-10(2)8-15(16)17-14-9-12(5)6-7-13(14)11(3)4/h10-14H,6-9H2,1-5H3/t12-,13+,14-/m1/s1 Key: VYQSSWZYPCCBRN-HZSPNIEDBT
- SMILES: C[C@@H]1CC[C@H]([C@@H](C1)OC(=O)CC(C)C)C(C)C

Properties
Chemical formula	C_{15}H_{28}O_{2}
Molar mass	240.387 g·mol^{−1}
- Except where otherwise noted, data are given for materials in their standard state (at 25 °C [77 °F], 100 kPa). Infobox references

Menthyl isovalerate, also known as validolum, is the menthyl ester of isovaleric acid. It is a transparent oily, colorless liquid with a smell of menthol. It is very slightly soluble in ethanol, while practically insoluble in water. It is used as a food additive for flavor and fragrance.

== Medical use ==
In Poland, Bulgaria, Romania and the former Soviet Union states including Russia, menthyl isovalerate mixed with roughly 25% menthol is sold as an anxiolytic under various trade names including Extravalerianic, Validol, Valofin, and Menthoval.

Validol, the anxiety medication containing a roughly 25% solution of menthol in menthyl isovalerate is prepared essentially in one step, in which the amount of menthol added before conducting the acid catalysed esterification is in an excess such that the resulting solution of the yielded ester has around 25% menthol, simplifying the procedure. Work up might consist of several washings, including one with aqueous sodium bicarbonate to neutralize traces of acid catalyst and unreacted isovaleric acid, and distillation.

== See also ==
- Methyl pentanoate
- Hopantenic acid
- Isovaleramide
- List of Russian drugs
