= Melatonin receptor =

Type of cell surface receptor

Melatonin receptor 1A

Identifiers
- Symbol: MTNR1A
- NCBI gene: 4543
- HGNC: 7463
- OMIM: 600665
- RefSeq: NM_005958
- UniProt: P48039

Other data
- Locus: Chr. 4 q35.1
Search for
- Structures: Swiss-model
- Domains: InterPro

Melatonin receptor 1B

Identifiers
- Symbol: MTNR1B
- NCBI gene: 4544
- HGNC: 7464
- OMIM: 600804
- RefSeq: NM_005959
- UniProt: P49286

Other data
- Locus: Chr. 11 q21-q22
Search for
- Structures: Swiss-model
- Domains: InterPro

Melatonin receptors are G protein-coupled receptors (GPCR) which bind melatonin. Three types of melatonin receptors have been cloned. The MT_{1} (or Mel_{1A} or MTNR1A) and MT_{2} (or Mel_{1B} or MTNR1B) receptor subtypes are present in humans and other mammals, while an additional melatonin receptor subtype MT_{3} (or Mel_{1C} or MTNR1C) has been identified in amphibia and birds. The receptors are crucial in the signal cascade of melatonin. In the field of chronobiology, melatonin has been found to be a key player in the synchrony of biological clocks. Melatonin secretion by the pineal gland has circadian rhythmicity regulated by the suprachiasmatic nucleus (SCN) found in the brain. The SCN functions as the timing regulator for melatonin; melatonin then follows a feedback loop to decrease SCN neuronal firing. The receptors MT_{1} and MT_{2} control this process. Melatonin receptors are found throughout the body in places such as the brain, the retina of the eye, the cardiovascular system, the liver and gallbladder, the colon, the skin, the kidneys, and many others. In 2019, X-ray crystal and cryo-EM structures of MT_{1} and MT_{2} were reported.

== History ==
Melatonin has been known about since the beginning of the 20th century with experiments led by Carey P. McCord and Floyd P. Allen. The two scientists obtained extracts of the pineal gland from bovines and noticed its blanching effects on the skin of tadpoles. The melatonin chemical was found and isolated in the pineal gland in 1958 by physician Aaron B. Lerner. Due to its ability to lighten skin, Lerner named the compound melatonin. Discovery of high affinity binding sites for melatonin were found near the end of the 20th century. The experiment to find these binding sites utilized an expression cloning strategy to isolate the site. The receptor was first cloned from the melanophores of Xenopus laevis. In recent years, research with melatonin has shown to improve neurological disorders such as Parkinson's, Alzheimer's disease, brain edema, and traumatic brain injury, alcoholism, and depression. Also, regulation of addictive behavior has been associated with the increase of melatonin receptor-related cAMP in the mesolimbic dopaminergic system. Melatonin treatment has also been studied as a remedy of disturbed circadian rhythms found in conditions such as jet lag, shift work, and types of insomnia.

== Function and regulation ==
=== General ===
Melatonin serves a variety of functions throughout the body. While its role in sleep promotion is its most well known, melatonin has its hands in a wide range of biological processes. In addition to sleep promotion, melatonin also regulates hormone secretion, rhythms in reproductive activity, immune functionality, and circadian rhythms. Further, melatonin functions as a neuroprotective, pain-reducer, tumor suppressor, reproduction stimulant, and antioxidant. Melatonin has an anti-excitatory effect on brain activity which is exemplified by its reduction of epileptic activity in children which is to say that it is an inhibitory transmitter. The functional diversity of the melatonin receptors contribute to the range of influence that melatonin has over various biological processes. Some of the functions/effects of melatonin binding to its receptor have been linked to one of the specific versions of the receptor that has been discriminated (MT_{1}, MT_{2}, MT_{3}). The expression patterns in melatonin receptors are unique and brain area specific. In mammals, melatonin receptors are found in the brain and some peripheral organs. However, there is considerable variation in the density and location of MT receptor expression between species, and the receptors show different affinities for different ligands.

=== MT_{1} ===
The sleep promoting effects of melatonin has been tied to the activation of the MT_{1} receptor in the suprachiasmatic nucleus (SCN) which has an inhibitory effect on brain activity. While the phase shifting activity of melatonin has largely been linked to the MT_{2} receptor, there is evidence to suggest that the MT_{1} receptor plays a role in the process of entrainment to light-dark cycles. This evidence comes from an experiment in which wild-type (WT) mice and MT_{1} knock-out (KO) mice were given melatonin and their rates of entrainment were observed. Entrainment was observed to accelerate in WT mice upon melatonin dosage but not in MT_{1} KO mice which lead to the conclusion that MT_{1} plays a role in phase-shifting activity.

Expression Patterns
The MT_{1} melatonin receptor sits on the cell membrane. In humans it consists of 351 amino acids that are encoded in chromosome 4. Its main function here is as an adenylate cyclase inhibitor, which works when MT_{1} binds to other G-proteins. In humans, The MT_{1} subtype is expressed in the pars tuberalis of the pituitary gland, the retina, and the suprachiasmatic nuclei of the hypothalamus, and are most likely found in human skin. As humans age, the expression of MT_{1} and the SCN decreases because MT_{1} reaction rate decreases and prolactin secretion decreases.

=== MT_{2} ===
The MT_{2} receptor has been shown to serve several functions in the body. In humans, the MT_{2} subtype's expression in the retina is suggestive of melatonin's effect on the mammalian retina occurring through this receptor. Research suggests that melatonin acts to inhibit the Ca2+-dependent release of dopamine. Melatonin's action in the retina is believed to affect several light-dependent functions, including phagocytosis and photopigment disc shedding. In addition to retina this receptor is expressed on the osteoblasts and is increased upon their differentiation. MT_{2} regulates proliferation and differentiation of osteoblasts and regulates their function in depositing bone. MT_{2} signaling seems also involved in the pathogenesis of type 2 diabetes. Activation of the MT_{2} receptor promotes vasodilation which lowers body temperature in the extremities upon daytime administration. The most notable of the functions that are largely mediated by the MT_{2} receptor is that of phase shifting the internal circadian clock to entrain to the Earth's natural light-dark cycle. As noted above, the MT_{1} receptor has been shown to have a hand in phase shifting but this role is secondary to that of the MT_{2} receptor. In experiments involving MT_{1} KO mice (and WT as a control) both WT and MT_{1} KO groups exhibited phase shifting activity. On the flip side, MT_{2} KO mice were not able to phase shift suggesting that the MT_{2} receptor is necessary for phase shifting the internal circadian clock.

Expression Patterns
The MT_{2} (cell membrane) subtype is expressed in the retina, and are also found in skin; MT_{2} receptor mRNA has not been detected by in situ hybridization in the rat suprachiasmatic nucleus or pars tuberalis. The MT_{2} receptor is found in chromosome four, of humans, and consists of 351 amino acids. Recently, scientists have been studying the relationship between the MT_{2} receptor and sleep disorders, anxiety, depression, and pain. Since it was found that MT_{2} receptors contribute to sleep regulation, through NREMS, and has anxiety reducing effects, scientists have begun to consider MT_{2} as a treatment target for the aforementioned afflictions.

=== MT_{3} ===
While MT_{3} has been briefly described in its potential role of regulating fluid pressure inside the eye, it does not carry the same relevance to critical biological process such as sleep promotion, locomotor activity, and circadian rhythm regulation that MT_{1} and MT_{2} do. MT3 also serves a detoxification role in liver, heart, intestine, kidney, muscle and fat.

Expression Patterns
The MT_{3} subtype of many non-mammalian vertebrates is expressed in various brain areas. MT_{3} is also known as a reductase detoxification enzyme (quinone reductase 2). The enzyme finds its home largely in the "liver, kidney, heart, lung, intestine, muscle and brown fat tissue".... and there is significant research that supports the claim that MT_{3} helps regulate the pressure that develops on the inside of the eye.

=== Melatonin binding ===
The melatonin receptors MT_{1} and MT_{2} are G-protein coupled receptors (GPCRs) that typically adhere to the cell's surface so that they can receive external melatonin signals. Binding of melatonin to the MT_{1} receptor leads to inhibition of cAMP production and Protein Kinase A (PKA). While activation of the MT2 receptor is also shown to inhibit the production of cAMP, it additionally inhibits cGMP production. Melatonin binding to the MT_{1} and MT_{2} receptors is only one of the paths through which it shows its influence. In addition to binding to membrane bound GPCRs (MT_{1} and MT_{2}) melatonin also binds to intracellular and nuclear receptors.

=== Regulation of melatonin receptors ===
The different types of melatonin receptors are regulated in different ways. When the MT_{1} receptor is exposed to typical levels of melatonin, there is no change in cell membrane receptor density, affinity for substrate, or functional sensitivity. However, the same trend is not shown in MT_{2} receptors. Administration of typical levels of melatonin resulted in the removal of MT_{2} receptors from the membrane (internalization) and a decrease in the sensitivity of the receptor to melatonin. These responses help the MT_{2} receptor accomplish its role in phase shifting the circadian clock by adjusting the sensitivity and availability of the population of MT_{2} to melatonin. This desensitization and/or internalization is characteristic of many GPCRs. Often, binding of melatonin to MT_{2} and subsequent desensitization can lead to the internalization of that receptor which decreases the availability of membrane bound melatonin receptor which will prevent additional melatonin from having as robust of an effect as the initial application. Since there are regular rhythms in both of these receptor subtypes, the internalization and resulting decrease in receptor availability following administration of typical levels of melatonin will effectively shift the phase of this rhythm in MT_{2}. The behavior of each of these receptors under prolonged exposure to their chief agonist - melatonin - is indicative of the functions that they are each crucial to.

=== Role in circadian rhythms ===
Since the SCN is responsible for mediating the production of melatonin by the pineal gland, it creates a feedback loop that regulates the production of melatonin according to the master circadian clock. As was discussed previously, the MT_{1} receptor is largely thought of as the major player in sleep-promotion and the MT_{2} receptor is most strongly linked to phase shifting activity. Both major subtypes of the melatonin receptor are expressed in relatively large amounts in the SCN which allow it to both regulate sleep-wake cycles and induce phase shifting in response to natural light-dark cycles. This functional diversity of melatonin receptors helps give the SCN the ability to not only keep near 24-hour time and entrain to an exactly 24-hour period, but also regulate, among other factors, wakefulness and activity throughout this cycle.

=== Dysfunction and supplemental melatonin ===
Melatonin's role as a hormone in the body is its most widely known and the primary target of supplemental melatonin. Many people who struggle with falling asleep utilize melatonin supplements to help induce the onset of their sleep. However, melatonin's influence on the body extends much further than simple sleep promotion. Melatonin has also been described as a "cellular protector". Studies have found that higher circadian levels of melatonin correspond to lower rates of breast cancer while abnormally low serum melatonin levels can increase a woman's chance of developing breast cancer. Irregular/arrhythmic melatonin levels has, in addition to cancer, been linked to development of cardiovascular disease.

== Selective ligands ==
=== Agonists ===
- 6-Hydroxymelatonin
- Agomelatine
- GR-196,429
- Melatonin
- N-Acetylserotonin
- Piromelatine
- Ramelteon
- Tasimelteon

=== Antagonists ===
- Afobazole
- Luzindole
- Prazosin

== See also ==
- Discovery and development of melatonin receptor agonists
