= Bemethyl =

Chemical compound

Clinical data
- Trade names: Metaprot, Antihot, Bemitil, Bemithylum, Bemactor
- Other names: bemetil, bemithil, bemithyl, bemythyl, Metaproth, Metaprote, 2-benzilidazol-thioethyl, 2-ethylthiobenzimidazole hydrobromide, 2-ethylsulfanyl-1H-benzimidazole;hydrobromide
- Routes of administration: Oral as (tablets or capsules)

Legal status
- Legal status: US: Unscheduled Not FDA approved; Rx-only (RU)

Identifiers
- IUPAC name: 2-Ethylsulfanyl-1H-benzimidazole
- CAS Number: 14610-11-8; hydrobromide: 109628-14-0
- PubChem CID: 720878
- ChemSpider: 629280
- UNII: 2S44TEQ96E; hydrobromide: TG4SAK8A5M
- CompTox Dashboard (EPA): DTXSID20352179 DTXSID00212924, DTXSID20352179

Chemical and physical data
- Formula: C_{9}H_{10}N_{2}S
- Molar mass: 178.25 g·mol^{−1}
- 3D model (JSmol): Interactive image
- SMILES: CCSC1=NC2=CC=CC=C2N1
- InChI: InChI=1S/C9H10N2S/c1-2-12-9-10-7-5-3-4-6-8(7)11-9/h3-6H,2H2,1H3,(H,10,11); Key:UGCOPUIBNABIEP-UHFFFAOYSA-N

Bemethyl, also commonly referred to in literature as bemitil, is an actoprotector drug which is also antihypoxant (combating conditions of hypoxia), antioxidant, and antimutagenic. Bemethyl is primarily classified as an actoprotector: a synthetic adaptogen with significant capacity to increase physical performance.

It is approved for use in Ukraine as a dietary supplement. Bemethyl is commonly used in preparing for international competitions by Ukrainian national sport teams.

Bemethyl is formulated as a hydrobromide salt. Its parent compound is 2-ethylsulfanyl-1H-benzimidazole.

== Research ==
=== Metabolic modulation ===
Bemethyl also has a positive effect on metabolic processes, allowing adaptation to conditions causing frequent hypoxia, and the obtained effect is long-lasting and also occurs after the end of dosage.

=== Anti-hypoxant ===
Bemethyl has been shown to preserve both physical and mental capacity in high-altitude, low-oxygen environments, particularly by its effect in helping control excess serum levels of cholesterol and bilirubin, which are known to have negative effects especially during adjustment to high-altitude environments.

=== Recovery from trauma ===
Bemethyl has also been shown to prevent permanent hearing loss and facilitate recovery of hearing after mine-explosion trauma, when treatment is initiated immediately after injury.

=== Anti-mutagenic ===
In one study, bemethyl was shown to prevent the mutagenic effect of white asbestos in mice and in cultured human whole blood.

A study using mice showed bemethyl to reduce mutation induced by certain mutagenic drugs.

Another study using cells from human donors showed Bemethyl to be anticlastogenic (able to minimize chromosome breakages).

=== Anti-asthenic ===
A study using mice established that both single and continuous dosing of bemethyl increases work capacity and accelerates rehabilitation after exhaustive exertion.

== Pharmacology ==
=== Pharmacodynamics ===
The mechanistic underpinnings of bemethyl's effects are not well understood, but some evidence implicate alterations in protein synthesis and glucose metabolism, in addition to antioxidant activity, as relevant mechanisms of action.

=== Pharmacokinetics ===
Bemethyl resists metabolization and is long-lived, accumulating in tissues over course of treatment. In one study involving rats, long-term administration of Bemethyl was accompanied by a 1.38-fold increase in drug concentration in the brain, and a 1.68-fold increase in its concentration in skeletal muscles.

== History ==
Bemethyl was developed in the 1970s by the Department of Pharmacology of the St. Petersburg State Military Medical Academy under the direction of Professor Vasily Mikhailovich Vinogradov. Professor Vinogradov and his research team earned the USSR State Prize for this accomplishment.

First used with Soviet cosmonauts, bemethyl was also used to prepare athletes of the USSR national team for the Moscow 1980 Olympic Games. In the 1990s, bemethyl saw use as a basic medicinal agent in many of the corps of the Soviet and Russian armies, including Soviet troops in Afghanistan, as bemethyl facilitated increased endurance for soldiers over long marches, as well as an enhanced work capacity and stability to hypoxia and high temperatures. Bemethyl was also used to enhance the physical and mental capacities of workers deployed in the wake of the 1986 Chernobyl disaster.

== Legal status ==
In 2018, bemitil was added to the World Anti-Doping Agency (WADA) Monitoring Program for both in-competition and out-of-competition use, in order to evaluate patterns of misuse in sport.

Bemitil remained on the Monitoring Program through 2021. Its monitoring was discontinued in 2022 after WADA stated that the required prevalence data had been obtained.

The WADA Monitoring Program covers substances that are not on the Prohibited List but that WADA wishes to monitor in order to detect patterns of misuse in sport.

== See also ==
- List of Russian drugs
