= Melatonin receptor 1C =

Protein

Identifiers
- Symbol: Mtnr1c
- NCBI gene: 30661
- RefSeq: AY166825
- UniProt: Q804I9
Search for
- Structures: Swiss-model
- Domains: InterPro

Melatonin receptor 1C, also known as MTNR1C, is a protein that is encoded by the Mtnr1c gene. This receptor has been identified in fish, amphibia, and birds, but not in humans.

== See also ==
- Melatonin receptor
