= Pharmahuasca =

Pharmaceutical version of the traditional Ayahuasca entheogen

Pharmahuasca is a pharmaceutical version of ayahuasca, a psychoactive decoction used by indigenous cultures in South America as part of traditional medicine and shamanism. Traditional ayahuasca is made by brewing the monoamine oxidase inhibitor (MAOI)-containing Banisteriopsis caapi vine with a dimethyltryptamine (DMT)-containing plant, such as Psychotria viridis. Pharmahuasca refers to a similar combination that uses a synthetically produced or pharmaceutical MAOI, such as moclobemide, instead of a plant.

== Use and effects ==
DMT and harmaline or harmine are typically used as components of pharmahuasca. One study tested a formulation of 100 mg buccal harmine with 100 mg intranasal DMT, which produced an effect lasting 2 to 3 hours. As a rule, the fewer the β-carbolines, the less nausea; the more DMT, the more spectacular the visions. The constituents are put into separate gelatin capsules. The capsules with harmaline/harmine are swallowed first and the capsules containing DMT are taken 15 to 20 minutes later. A synthetic MAOI can be used in place of harmaline and harmine, although caution must be taken when choosing an MAOI. The use of moclobemide, a reversible inhibitor of monoamine oxidase-A (RIMA), has been recorded and is safer than older irreversible MAOIs (such as isocarboxazid) due to its significantly shorter and more selective effects (although it still exhibits a wide range of dangerous drug-drug interactions).

Oral doses and durations of β-carbolines or harmala alkaloids
Compound	Chemical name	Dose (hallucinogen)	Potency	Dose (MAOI)	Duration
Harman	1-Methyl-β-carboline	>250 mg	Unknown	>250 mg	Unknown
Harmine	7-Methoxyharman	>300 mg	≤50%	140–250 mg	6–8 hours
Harmaline	7-Methoxy-3,4-dihydroharman	150–400 mg	100%	70–150 mg	5–8 hours
Tetrahydroharmine	7-Methoxy-1,2,3,4-tetrahydroharman	≥300 mg	~33%	Unknown	Unknown
6-Methoxyharmalan	6-Methoxy-3,4-dihydroharman	~100 mg	~150%	Unknown	Unknown
6-MeO-THH	6-Methoxy-1,2,3,4-tetrahydroharman	≥100 mg	~50%	Unknown	Unknown
P. harmala seeds	–	≥5–28 g^{a}	–	3–5 g^{a}	Unknown
Footnotes: ^{a} = P. harmala seeds in ground form. They contain 2–7% harmala alkaloids, with 1 teaspoon ≈ 3 g ≈ 60–180 mg alkaloids; 1 tablespoon ≈ 9 g ≈ 200–600 mg alkaloids; and 1 large (OO) gelatin capsule ≈ 0.7 g ≈ 15–45 mg alkaloids. For comparison, B. caapi contains 0.05–1.95% (average 0.45%) harmala alkaloids. Note: Harmine and other β-carbolines have also been tested by non-oral routes such as sublingual, subcutaneous injection, intramuscular injection, and intravenous injection. Refs: See template page.

== See also ==
- Ayahuasca
- Dimethyltryptamine/harmine
- Dimethyltryptamine/β-carbolines
