= Richard Manske =

- Born: 14 September 1901; Berlin, Germany
- Died: 1977
- Other name: Richard Helmuth Fredrick Manske
- Education: University of Manchester, Queen's University
- Occupation: Chemist
- Years active: 1924–
- Organization(s): General Motors, Yale University, National Research Council
- Known for: Synthesizing dimethyltryptamine (DMT), identifying and synthesizing harmine and harmaline, others

Richard Manske (1901–1977), also known by his full name Richard Helmuth Fredrick Manske, was a German–Canadian chemist who worked in the area of alkaloid chemistry.

Manske was born in Germany in 1901 and emigrated with his parents to Canada in 1906. He received his bachelor's degree in 1923, his master's degree in 1924, and his Ph.D. in 1926. Manske married his first wife, Jean Gray, in 1924. He worked at Uniroyal from 1943 to 1966. Manske also worked for the Canadian National Research Council and was an adjunct professor at the University of Waterloo. He died in Ontario, Canada following injuries sustained in an automobile accident in 1977. Manske received many honors and awards throughout his career. He was an editor of the book series The Alkaloids.

Manske was the first to synthesize the psychedelic drug dimethyltryptamine (DMT). He synthesized and described DMT in 1931. However, DMT was not subsequently found naturally in plants until 1946 and its hallucinogenic effects were not discovered until 1956 by Stephen Szara.

In addition to synthesizing DMT, Manske is known for identifying the chemical structures of and synthesizing the harmala alkaloids and hallucinogens harmine and harmaline in 1927 as well as for many other scientific contributions to alkaloid chemistry.

== See also ==
- List of psychedelic chemists
- Oswaldo Gonçalves de Lima
