= C12H12N2O2 =

The molecular formula C_{12}H_{12}N_{2}O_{2} (molar mass : 216.24 g/mol) may refer to:

- Cyclazodone
- Harmalacidine
