= Harmalacidine =

Clinical data
- Other names: Ketotetrahydronorharmine; Oxotetrahydronorharmine; 7-Methoxy-2,3,4,9-tetrahydro-1H-β-carbolin-1-one; 1-Keto-7-methoxytryptoline
- Drug class: Monoamine oxidase inhibitor (MAOI); Reversible inhibitor of MAO-A (RIMA)
- ATC code: None

Identifiers
- IUPAC name: 7-methoxy-2,3,4,9-tetrahydropyrido[3,4-b]indol-1-one
- CAS Number: 26579-69-1
- PubChem CID: 179484
- ChemSpider: 156232
- ChEMBL: ChEMBL4059776
- CompTox Dashboard (EPA): DTXSID20181148

Chemical and physical data
- Formula: C_{12}H_{12}N_{2}O_{2}
- Molar mass: 216.240 g·mol^{−1}
- 3D model (JSmol): Interactive image
- SMILES: COC1=CC2=C(C=C1)C3=C(N2)C(=O)NCC3
- InChI: InChI=1S/C12H12N2O2/c1-16-7-2-3-8-9-4-5-13-12(15)11(9)14-10(8)6-7/h2-3,6,14H,4-5H2,1H3,(H,13,15); Key:MWEGNYFSTKOOSD-UHFFFAOYSA-N

Harmalacidine, also known as 7-methoxy-2,3,4,9-tetrahydro-1H-β-carbolin-1-one or as 1-keto-7-methoxytryptoline, is a harmala alkaloid and β-carboline found in Peganum harmala (Syrian rue) and Banisteriopsis caapi. It is a reversible inhibitor of monoamine oxidase A (RIMA), with similar potency as harmine (IC_{50} = 457 nM and 506 nM, respectively). The alkaloid was isolated from Banisteriopsis caapi in 1976 and from Peganum harmala in 1988. The amounts of harmalacidine in Peganum harmala seeds vary widely, ranging from milligram to gram quantities.

== See also ==
- Substituted β-carboline
- Harmala alkaloid
