= Dimethyltryptamine/β-carbolines =

- Dimethyltryptamine

- Harmine

Harmaline (left) and tetrahydroharmine (right)

Combination of
- Dimethyltryptamine: Serotonergic psychedelic; Serotonin receptor agonist
- Harmine: RIMA
- Harmaline: RIMA
- Tetrahydroharmine: RIMA

Clinical data
- Other names: DMT/β-carboline; DMT/beta-carbolines; DMT/beta-carboline; DMT/harmine/harmaline/THH

Dimethyltryptamine/β-carbolines, also known as DMT/harmine/harmaline/THH, is a combination of dimethyltryptamine (DMT), a tryptamine serotonin receptor agonist and serotonergic psychedelic, and the β-carbolines and reversible inhibitors of MAO-A (RIMAs) harmine, harmaline, and tetrahydroharmine (THH), which is under development for potential medical use.

It is a form of pharmahuasca (pharmaceutical ayahuasca), in which DMT is combined with synthetically produced monoamine oxidase inhibitors (MAOIs) as opposed to a plant-derived form such as Banisteriopsis caapi as in ayahuasca. The β-carbolines, acting as RIMAs, inhibit the metabolism of DMT, in turn greatly potentiating DMT and allowing it to become orally active.

The combination is being developed by Psychae Therapeutics. As of 2025, it is in phase 1 clinical trials.

== See also ==
- List of investigational hallucinogens and entactogens
- Dimethyltryptamine/harmine
