= Oswaldo Gonçalves de Lima =

Brazilian chemist and microbiologist

- Born: 7 November 1908
- Died: 21 September 1989 (aged 80)
- Occupations: Chemist and microbiologist
- Known for: Isolation of dimethyltryptamine (DMT), other contributions

Oswaldo Gonçalves de Lima (7 November 1908 – 21 September 1989) was a Brazilian chemist and microbiologist. He is notable in having been the first to isolate the psychedelic drug dimethyltryptamine (DMT) from natural sources, specifically Mimosa tenuiflora, in 1946, after having observed entheogenic use of vinho de jurema by locals in Brazil. de Lima isolated the compound in an impure form and was unaware of its chemical identity, naming it nigerina (nigerine) at the time. He also tested and observed its effects in rodents, but did not test it in humans. Subsequently, DMT was isolated unequivocally for the first time by M. S. Fish and colleagues in 1955 and its hallucinogenic effects were discovered by Stephen Szara in 1956. Then, in 1959, using the same plant that de Lima had employed, nigerine was shown to be identical to DMT by Irwin Pachter and colleagues. Besides the initial isolation of DMT, de Lima also made many other scientific contributions.

== See also ==
- List of psychedelic chemists
- Richard Manske
