= Dimethyltryptamine/harmine =

- Dimethyltryptamine

- Harmine

Combination of
- Dimethyltryptamine: Serotonergic psychedelic; Serotonin receptor agonist
- Harmine: Reversible inhibitor of monoamine oxidase A

Clinical data
- Other names: DMT/harmine; Harmine/dimethyltryptamine; Harmine/DMT; Dimethyltryptamine/telepathine; DMT/telepathine; Telepathine/dimethyltryptamine; telepathine/DMT; RE01
- Routes of administration: Unspecified

Dimethyltryptamine/harmine (developmental code name RE01 or RE-01) is a combination of dimethyltryptamine (DMT), a tryptamine serotonin receptor agonist and serotonergic psychedelic, and harmine, a β-carboline reversible inhibitor of monoamine oxidase A (RIMA), which is under development for the treatment of mood disorders.

It is a form of pharmahuasca (pharmaceutical ayahuasca), in which DMT is combined with a synthetically produced monoamine oxidase inhibitor (MAOI) as opposed to a plant-derived form such as Banisteriopsis caapi as in ayahuasca. Harmine, acting as a RIMA, inhibits the metabolism of DMT, in turn greatly potentiating DMT and allowing it to become orally active.

The combination is being developed by Reconnect Labs. As of August 2023, it is in phase 1 clinical trials.

== See also ==
- List of investigational hallucinogens and entactogens
- Dimethyltryptamine/β-carbolines
