= Ayahuasca =

South American psychoactive decoction

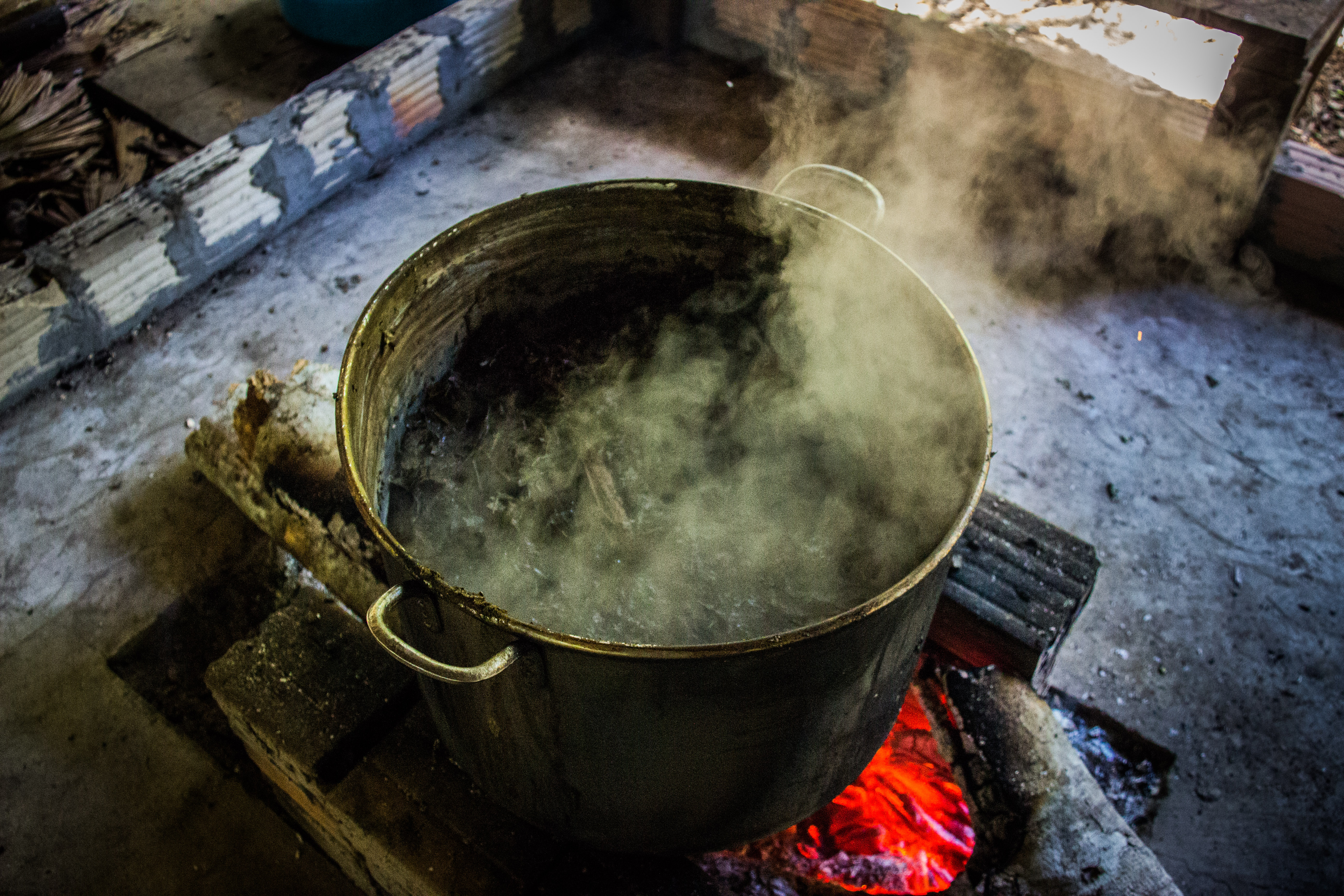
- Ayahuasca being brewed in Iquitos, Peru
- Source plant(s): Liana; Banisteriopsis caapi
- Part(s) of plant: Stems of the Banisteriopsis caapi; Leaves of the Psychotria viridis
- Geographic origin: South America
- Active ingredients: Dimethyltryptamine (DMT); Harmala alkaloids like harmine and harmaline as MAOI
- Uses: Polysubstance indigenous drink

Ayahuasca (Note: Pronounced as /ˌaɪ(j)əˈwæskə/ in the UK and /ˌaɪ(j)əˈwɑːskə/ in the US. Also occasionally known in English as ayaguasca (Spanish-derived), aioasca (Brazilian Portuguese–derived), or as yagé, pronounced /jɑːˈheɪ/ or /jæˈheɪ/. Etymologically, all forms but yagé descend from the compound Quechua word ayawaska, from aya (transl. soul) and waska (transl. vine). For more names for ayahuasca, see § Etymology.) is a South American psychoactive decoction prepared from Banisteriopsis caapi vine and a dimethyltryptamine (DMT)-containing plant, used by Indigenous cultures in the Amazon and Orinoco basins as part of traditional medicine and shamanism. The word ayahuasca, originating from Quechuan languages spoken in the Andes, refers both to the B. caapi vine and the psychoactive brew made from it, with its name meaning 'spirit rope' or 'liana of the soul'.

Although often portrayed as ancient, ayahuasca likely spread across the western Amazon only within the past few centuries; the first clear written accounts appear in the 17th century. The specific ritual use of ayahuasca was widespread among Indigenous groups by the 19th century. Ayahuasca is traditionally prepared by macerating and boiling B. caapi with other plants like Psychotria viridis during a ritualistic, multi-day process. Ayahuasca has been used in diverse South American cultures for spiritual, social, and medicinal purposes, often guided by shamans in ceremonial contexts involving specific dietary and ritual practices, with the Shipibo-Konibo people playing a significant historical and cultural role in its use. Originally confined to regions of Peru, Brazil, Colombia, and Ecuador, ayahuasca became widespread in Brazil, expanding widely by the mid-20th century through syncretic religions in Brazil. In the late 20th century, ayahuasca use expanded beyond South America to Europe, North America, and elsewhere, leading to legal cases, non-religious adaptations, and the development of ayahuasca analogues (i.e., variants) using local or synthetic ingredients.

While DMT is internationally classified as a controlled substance, the plants containing it—including those used to make ayahuasca—are not regulated under international law, leading to varied national policies that range from permitting religious use to imposing bans or decriminalization. The United States patent office controversially granted, challenged, revoked, reinstated, and ultimately allowed to expire a patent on the ayahuasca vine, sparking disputes over intellectual property rights and the cultural and religious significance of traditional Indigenous knowledge.

Ayahuasca produces intense psychological and spiritual experiences. Ayahuasca's psychoactive effects primarily result from DMT, rendered orally active by harmala alkaloids in B. caapi, which act as reversible inhibitors of monoamine oxidase; B. caapi and its β-carbolines also exhibit independent contributions to ayahuasca's effects, acting on serotonin and benzodiazepine receptors. Higher doses of ayahuasca or harmala alkaloids may increase risks.

== Preparation ==
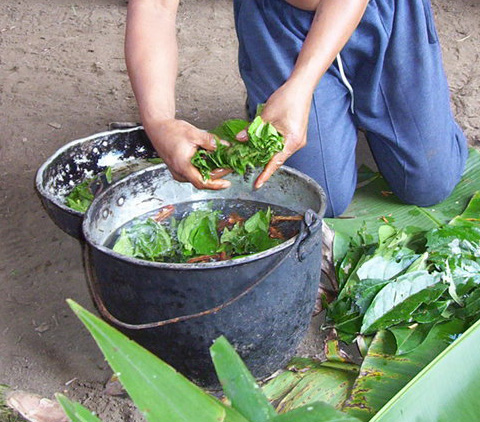
Ayahuasca being prepared in the Napo region of Ecuador

Sections of Banisteriopsis caapi vine are macerated and boiled alone or with leaves from any of a number of other plants, including Psychotria viridis (chacruna), Diplopterys cabrerana (also known as chaliponga and chacropanga), and Mimosa tenuiflora, among other ingredients which can vary greatly from one shaman to the next. The resulting brew may contain the powerful psychedelic drug dimethyltryptamine and monoamine oxidase inhibiting harmala alkaloids, which are necessary to make the DMT orally active by allowing it (DMT) to be processed by the liver. The traditional making of ayahuasca follows a ritual process that requires the user to pick the lower Chacruna leaf at sunrise, then say a prayer. The vine must be "cleaned meticulously with wooden spoons" and pounded "with wooden mallets until it's fibre."

Brews can also be made with plants that do not contain DMT, Psychotria viridis being replaced by plants such as Justicia pectoralis, Brugmansia, or sacred tobacco, also known as mapacho (Nicotiana rustica), or sometimes left out with no replacement. This brew varies radically from one batch to the next, both in potency and psychoactive effect, based mainly on the skill of the shaman or brewer, as well as other admixtures sometimes added and the intent of the ceremony. Natural variations in plant alkaloid content and profiles also affect the final concentration of alkaloids in the brew, and the physical act of cooking may also serve to modify the alkaloid profile of harmala alkaloids.

The actual preparation of the brew takes several hours, often taking place over the course of more than one day. After adding the plant material, each separately at this stage, to a large pot of water, it is boiled until the water is reduced by half in volume. The individual brews are then combined and brewed until reduced significantly, producing the form taken by participants in ayahuasca ceremonies.

== Traditional use ==
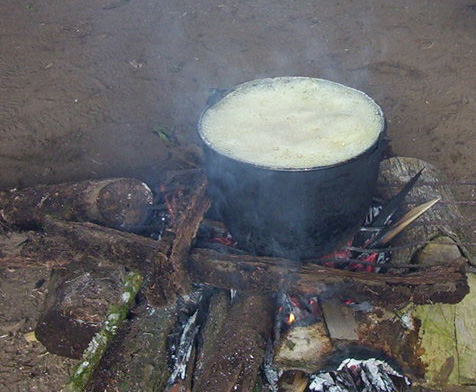
Ayahuasca cooking in the Loreto region of Peru

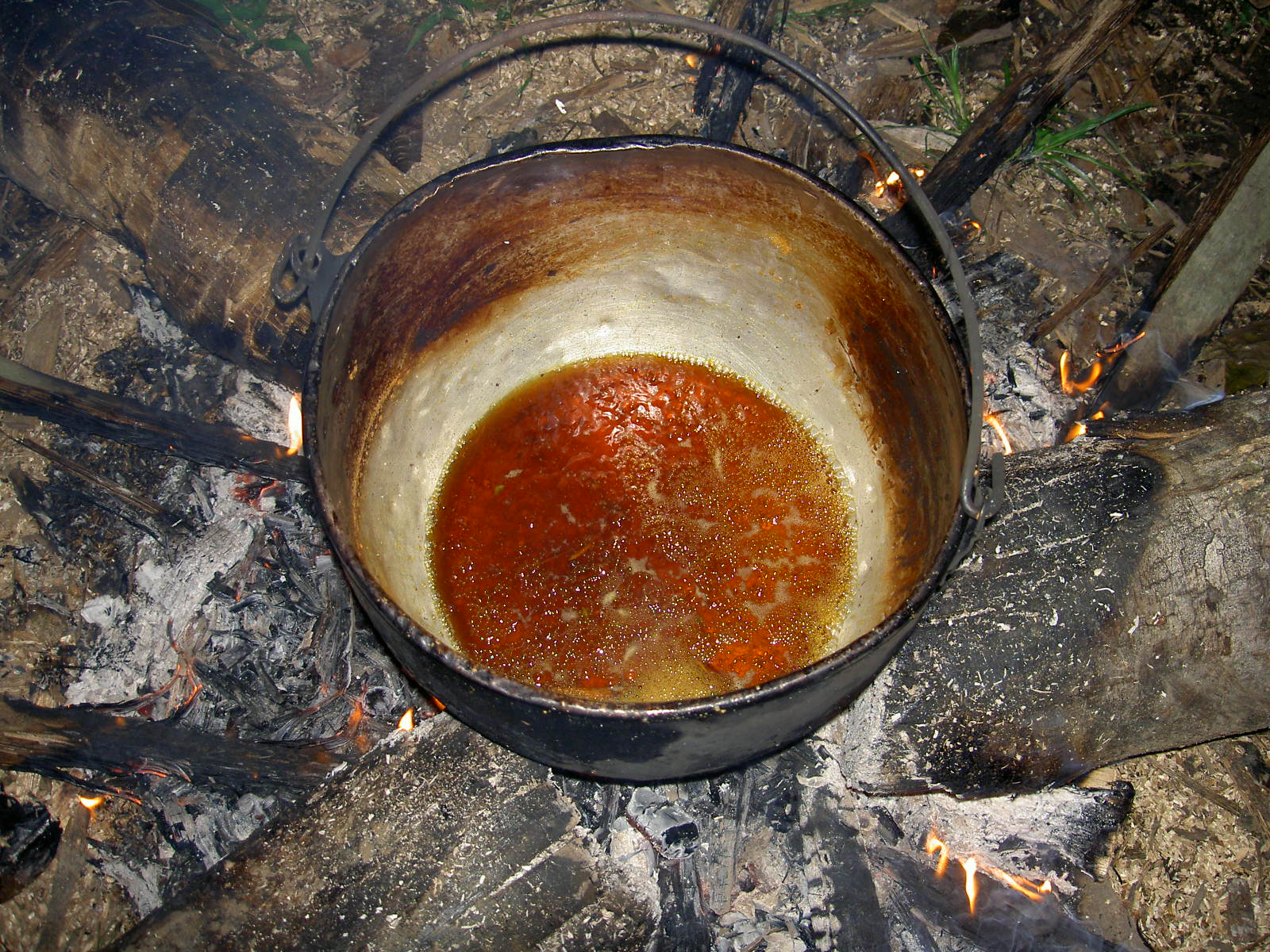
Ayahuasca being prepared in Ecuador

The uses of ayahuasca in traditional societies in South America vary greatly. Some cultures do use it for shamanic purposes, but in other cases, it is consumed socially among friends, in order to learn more about the natural environment.

Nonetheless, people who work with ayahuasca in non-traditional contexts often align themselves with the philosophies and cosmologies associated with ayahuasca shamanism, as practiced among Indigenous peoples like the Urarina of the Peruvian Amazon. Dietary taboos are often associated with the use of ayahuasca, although these seem to be specific to the culture around Iquitos, Peru, a major center of ayahuasca tourism. Ayahuasca retreats or healing centers can also be found in the Sacred Valley of Peru, in areas such as Cusco and Urubamba, where similar dietary preparations can be observed. These retreats often employ members of the Shipibo-Konibo tribe, an indigenous community native to the Peruvian Amazon.

In the rainforest, these taboos tend towards the purification of one's self—abstaining from spicy and heavily seasoned foods, excess fat, salt, caffeine, acidic foods (such as citrus) and sex before, after, or during a ceremony. A diet low in foods containing tyramine has been recommended, as the speculative interaction of tyramine and MAOIs could lead to a hypertensive crisis; however, evidence indicates that harmala alkaloids act only on MAO-A, in a reversible way similar to moclobemide (an antidepressant that does not require dietary restrictions). Dietary restrictions are not used by the highly urban Brazilian ayahuasca church União do Vegetal, suggesting the risk is much lower than perceived and probably non-existent.

The ritual use of ayahuasca by the Achuar people is featured in the Bruce Parry 2008 documentary series Amazon, in which Parry participates in the rite.

=== Ceremony and the role of shamans ===
Shamans, curanderos and experienced users of ayahuasca advise against consuming ayahuasca when not in the presence of one or several well-trained shamans.

In some areas, there are purported brujos (Spanish for "witches") who masquerade as real shamans and who entice tourists to drink ayahuasca in their presence. Shamans believe one of the purposes for this is to steal one's energy and/or power, of which they believe every person has a limited stockpile.

The shamans lead the ceremonial consumption of the ayahuasca beverage, in a rite that typically takes place over the entire night. During the ceremony, the effect of the drink lasts for hours. Prior to the ceremony, participants are instructed to abstain from spicy foods, red meat and sex. The ceremony is usually accompanied with purging which include vomiting and diarrhea, which is believed to release built-up emotions and negative energy.

=== Shipibo-Konibo and their relation to Ayahuasca ===
It is believed that the Shipibo-Konibo are among the earliest practitioners of Ayahuasca ceremonies, with their connection to the brew and ceremonies surrounding it dating back centuries, perhaps a millennium.

Some members of the Shipibo community have taken to the media to express their views on Ayahuasca entering the mainstream, with some calling it "the commercialization of ayahuasca." Some of them have even expressed their worry regarding the increased popularity, saying "the contemporary 'ayahuasca ceremony' may be understood as a substitute for former cosmogonical rituals that are nowadays not performed anymore."

=== Icaros ===
The Shipibo language, a Panoan language spoken by approximately 26,000 Shipibo people in Peru and Brazil, is commonly sung by the shaman in the form of a chant, called an Icaro, during the Ayahuasca ritual as a way to establish a "balance of energy" during the ritual to help protect and guide the user during their experience.

=== Traditional brew ===
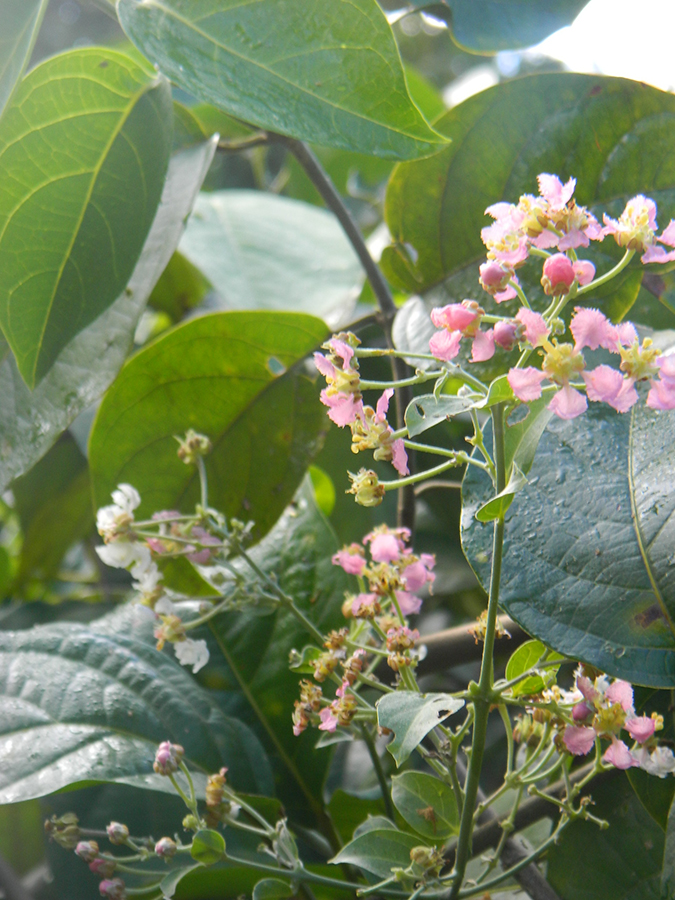
B. caapi inflorescence

Traditional ayahuasca brews are usually made with Banisteriopsis caapi as an MAOI, while dimethyltryptamine sources and other admixtures vary from region to region. There are several varieties of caapi, often known as different "colors", with varying effects, potencies, and uses.

DMT admixtures:

- Psychotria viridis (Chacruna) – leaves
- Psychotria carthagenensis (Amyruca) – leaves
- Diplopterys cabrerana (Chaliponga, Chagropanga, Banisteriopsis rusbyana) – leaves
- Mimosa tenuiflora (M. hostilis) - root bark

Other common admixtures:

- Justicia pectoralis
- Brugmansia sp. (Toé)
- Opuntia sp.
- Epiphyllum sp.
- Cyperus sp.
- Nicotiana rustica (Mapacho, variety of tobacco)
- Ilex guayusa, a relative of yerba mate
- Lygodium venustum, (Tchai del monte)
- Phrygilanthus eugenioides and Clusia sp (both called Miya)
- Lomariopsis japurensis (Shoka)

Common admixtures with their associated ceremonial values and spirits:

- Ayahuma bark: Cannon Ball tree. Provides protection and is used in healing susto (soul loss from spiritual fright or trauma).
- Capirona bark: Provides cleansing, balance and protection. It is noted for its smooth bark, white flowers, and hard wood.
- Chullachaki caspi bark (Byrsonima christianeae): Provides cleansing to the physical body. Used to transcend physical body ailments.
- Lopuna blanca bark: Provides protection.
- Punga amarilla bark: Yellow Punga. Provides protection. Used to pull or draw out negative spirits or energies.
- Remo caspi bark: Oar Tree. Used to move dense or dark energies.
- Wyra (huaira) caspi bark (Cedrelinga catanaeformis): Air Tree. Used to create purging, transcend gastro/intestinal ailments, calm the mind, and bring tranquility.
- Shiwawaku bark: Brings purple medicine to the ceremony.
- Uchu sanango: Head of the sanango plants.
- Huacapurana: Giant tree of the Amazon with very hard bark.
- Bobinsana (Calliandra angustifolia): Mermaid Spirit. Provides major heart chakra opening, healing of emotions and relationships.

== Non-traditional use ==
In the late 20th century, the practice of ayahuasca drinking began spreading to Europe, North America and elsewhere. The first ayahuasca churches, affiliated with the Brazilian Santo Daime, were established in the Netherlands. A legal case was filed against two of the Church's leaders, Hans Bogers (one of the original founders of the Dutch Santo Daime community) and Geraldine Fijneman (the head of the Amsterdam Santo Daime community). Bogers and Fijneman were charged with distributing a controlled substance (DMT); however, the prosecution was unable to prove that the use of ayahuasca by members of the Santo Daime constituted a sufficient threat to public health and order such that it warranted denying their rights to religious freedom under ECHR Article 9. The 2001 verdict of the Amsterdam district court is an important precedent. Since then groups that are not affiliated to the Santo Daime have used ayahuasca, and a number of different "styles" have been developed, including non-religious approaches.

In Peru, retreat centers such as Blue Morpho, founded by Hamilton Souther, in Iquitos began offering ayahuasca ceremonies to foreign visitors around 2004. International media coverage brought wider attention to the practice and coincided with the growth of ayahuasca tourism.

=== Ayahuasca variants ===
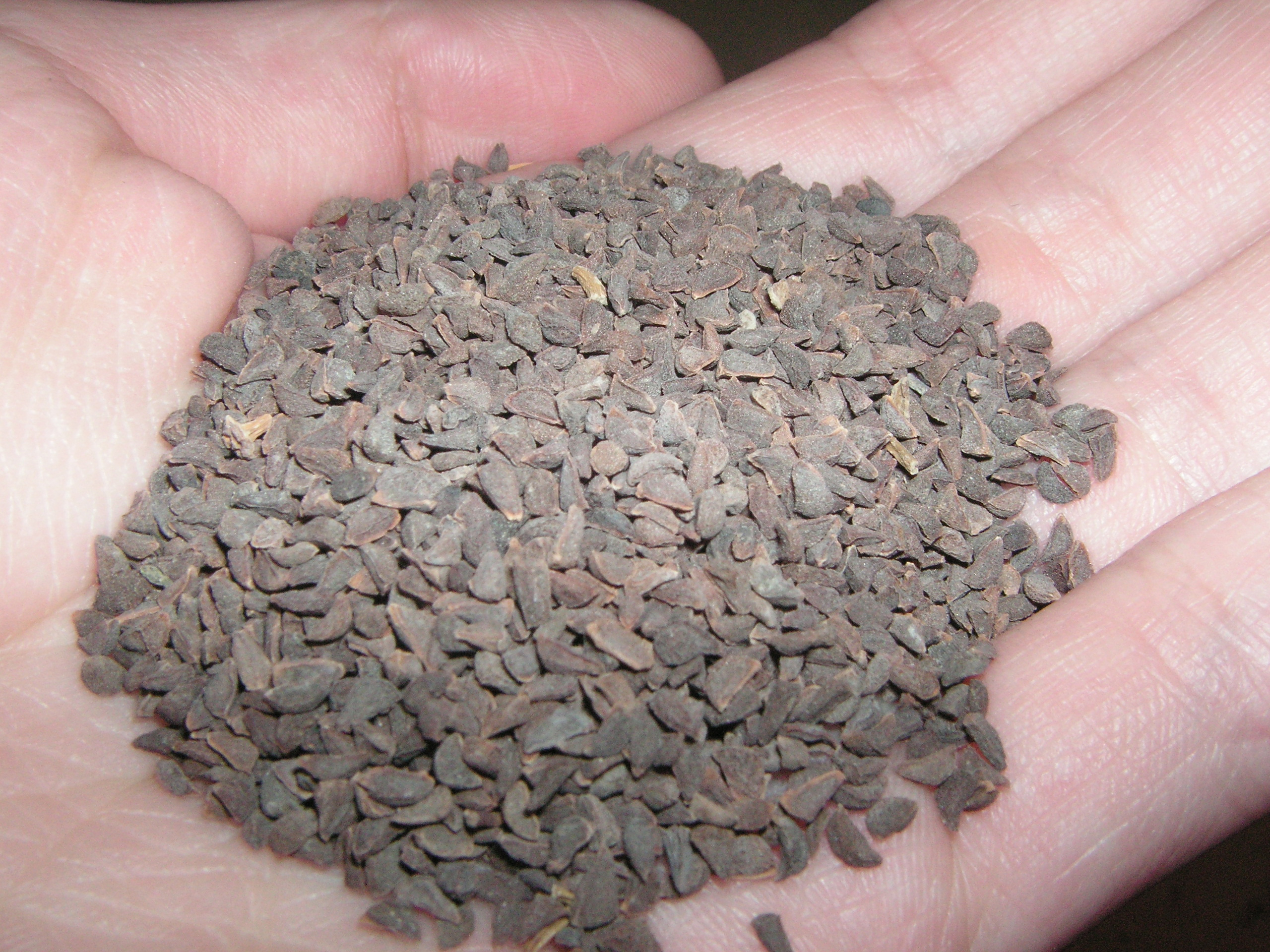
Syrian rue seeds can be used to provide an MAOI.

In modern Europe and North America, ayahuasca analogues (i.e., variants) are often prepared using non-traditional plants which contain the same alkaloids. For example, seeds of the Syrian rue plant can be used as a substitute for the ayahuasca vine, and the DMT-rich Mimosa hostilis is used in place of chacruna. Australia has several indigenous plants which are popular among modern ayahuasqueros there, such as various DMT-rich species of Acacia.

The name "ayahuasca" specifically refers to a decoction that contains Banisteriopsis caapi.

Brews similar to ayahuasca may be prepared using several plants not traditionally used in South America:

DMT admixtures:

- Acacia maidenii (Maiden's wattle) – bark *not all plants are "active strains", meaning some plants will have very little DMT and others larger amounts
- Acacia phlebophylla, and other Acacias, most commonly employed in Australia – bark
- Anadenanthera peregrina, A. colubrina, A. excelsa, A. macrocarpa
- Desmanthus illinoensis (Illinois bundleflower) – root bark is mixed with a native source of carbolines (e.g., passion flower in North America) to produce a hallucinogenic drink called prairiehuasca.

MAOI admixtures:

- Harmal (Peganum harmala, Syrian rue) – seeds
- Passion flower
- Synthetic MAOIs, especially RIMAs (due to the dangers presented by irreversible MAOIs)

== Effects ==
People who have consumed ayahuasca report having mystical experiences and spiritual revelations regarding their purpose on earth, the true nature of the universe, and deep insight into how to be the best person they possibly can. Many people also report therapeutic effects, especially around depression and personal traumas.

This is viewed by many as a spiritual awakening and what is often described as a near-death experience or rebirth. It is often reported that individuals feel they gain access to higher spiritual dimensions and make contact with various spiritual or extra-dimensional beings who can act as guides or healers.

The experiences that people have while under the influence of ayahuasca are also culturally influenced. Westerners typically describe experiences with psychological terms like "ego death" and understand the hallucinations as repressed memories or metaphors of mental states. However, at least in Iquitos, Peru (a center of ayahuasca ceremonies), those from the area describe the experiences more in terms of the actions in the body and understand the visions as reflections of their environment, sometimes including the person who they believe caused their illness, as well as interactions with spirits.

== Contraindications ==
Ayahuasca has a number of major contraindications due to its action as a monoamine oxidase inhibitor (MAOI) and the potential for serious drug interactions. These include concomitant use with serotonergic agents like selective serotonin reuptake inhibitors (SSRIs), MDMA, and dextromethorphan (DXM) due to risk of serotonin syndrome, sympathomimetics like amphetamines and cocaine due to risk of hypertensive crisis, and certain other drugs. Little information is available on ayahuasca in people with cardiovascular disease and whether there may be contraindications in this area. In any case, it has been said that cardiovascular problems, as well as endocrine problems, abnormal lipid metabolism, glaucoma, fever, and pregnancy are all contraindications of ayahuasca. Certain psychiatric disorders such as psychosis or bipolar mania or family history of such conditions may also be contraindications of ayahuasca.

== Adverse effects ==
Although ayahuasca is generally safe in traditional use, adverse effects can occur. In the short term, ingesting ayahuasca can cause nausea, vomiting, and diarrhea. These three effects, known as purging, are traditionally recognized to be a part of the spiritual experience of ayahuasca. Physiologically, vomiting may be related to increased serotonergic signaling in the gut, which directly stimulates the vagus nerve. Other short-term side effects include increased blood pressure and tachycardia. Additionally, increased secretion of hormones like prolactin, cortisone, and growth hormone has been correlated with ayahuasca consumption. Rarer side effects include shortness of breath, seizures and serotonin syndrome. Ayahuasca is suspected of triggering psychosis and schizophrenia in people with a predisposition to the condition, and there is a lack of safety information for ayahuasca's possible effects on pregnancy and breastfeeding. A 2024 review found that traditional ayahuasca use is generally safe, but higher doses of ayahuasca or higher doses of isolated harmala alkaloids like harmaline may pose risks.

== Overdose ==
There have been cases of death with dimethyltryptamine (DMT). In terms of extrapolated human lethal dose based on animal studies and human case reports, the lethal dose of ayahuasca relative to a typical recreational or entheogenic dose is estimated to be 50-fold.

== Interactions ==
Due to the monoamine oxidase inhibitor (MAOI) activity of ayahuasca, it has a prominent risk of drug interactions with other monoaminergic agents. As an example, combination of ayahuasca with a selective serotonin reuptake inhibitor (SSRI) can result in potentially life-threatening serotonin syndrome.

== Pharmacology ==
=== Pharmacodynamics ===
Most psychological effects can be accredited to the influx of serotonin caused by the psychoactive combination of DMT with beta-carbolines. Serotonin stimulates a group of G-protein coupled receptors known as 5-HT receptors. Specifically, stimulation of the 5-HT2A receptor type is correlated with hallucinogenic effects.

==== Dimethyltryptamine ====
Dimethyltryptamine (DMT) is a naturally occurring, serotonergic hallucinogen found in plants and mammals, classified as a DEA Schedule I substance with no accepted medical use, and under investigation for clinical applications.

Ayahuasca's psychoactive effects stem mainly from DMT, made orally active by MAOIs in the B. caapi vine, and its activation of serotonin receptors, particularly 5-HT2A, with additional contributions from harmine and harmaline.

==== Harmala alkaloids ====
While many studies focus on DMT and serotonin agonists, recent research and traditional use highlight the central role of the B. caapi vine and its β-carbolines in ayahuasca, noting their potential psychotropic effects through serotonin and benzodiazepine receptor interactions.

Harmala alkaloids like harmaline and harmine are believed to cause hallucinations, vomiting, confusion, and ataxia through central nervous system stimulation and 5-HT receptor binding, similar to DMT.

Oral doses and durations of β-carbolines or harmala alkaloids
Compound	Chemical name	Dose (hallucinogen)	Potency	Dose (MAOI)	Duration
Harman	1-Methyl-β-carboline	>250 mg	Unknown	>250 mg	Unknown
Harmine	7-Methoxyharman	>300 mg	≤50%	140–250 mg	6–8 hours
Harmaline	7-Methoxy-3,4-dihydroharman	150–400 mg	100%	70–150 mg	5–8 hours
Tetrahydroharmine	7-Methoxy-1,2,3,4-tetrahydroharman	≥300 mg	~33%	Unknown	Unknown
6-Methoxyharmalan	6-Methoxy-3,4-dihydroharman	~100 mg	~150%	Unknown	Unknown
6-MeO-THH	6-Methoxy-1,2,3,4-tetrahydroharman	≥100 mg	~50%	Unknown	Unknown
P. harmala seeds	–	≥5–28 g^{a}	–	3–5 g^{a}	Unknown
Footnotes: ^{a} = P. harmala seeds in ground form. They contain 2–7% harmala alkaloids, with 1 teaspoon ≈ 3 g ≈ 60–180 mg alkaloids; 1 tablespoon ≈ 9 g ≈ 200–600 mg alkaloids; and 1 large (OO) gelatin capsule ≈ 0.7 g ≈ 15–45 mg alkaloids. For comparison, B. caapi contains 0.05–1.95% (average 0.45%) harmala alkaloids. Note: Harmine and other β-carbolines have also been tested by non-oral routes such as sublingual, subcutaneous injection, intramuscular injection, and intravenous injection. Refs: See template page.

===== Harmine =====
Chemical structure of harmine.

Harmine is a naturally occurring harmala alkaloid with monoamine oxidase-inhibiting under preliminary research for potential anti-HIV properties. It is found in various plants such as Peganum harmala and B. caapi, historically studied for Parkinson's disease and currently in early-phase clinical trials.

Harmine is the primary β-carboline alkaloid in ayahuasca and has been studied for potential therapeutic effects including modulation of astrocytic function, anti-inflammatory properties, influence on neural progenitor proliferation, and possible roles in addiction and depression treatment through mechanisms involving glutamate regulation and BDNF signaling.

===== Harmaline =====
Chemical structure of harmaline.

Harmaline is a β-carboline alkaloid derived from the harman skeleton, found in various organisms including Peganum seeds, and acts as a oneirogen.

Harmaline, a harmala alkaloid, has been reported to exhibit a range of pharmacological effects, including hypothermic, vasorelaxant, antimicrobial, antitumoral, antiplatelet, antileishmanial, and antiplasmodial activities, as well as anxiolytic, antidepressant, and hallucinogenic properties at certain doses.

===== Tetrahydroharmine =====
Chemical structure of tetrahydroharmine.

Tetrahydroharmine is a harmala alkaloid found in organisms such as Daphnia pulex and Euglena gracilis.

Tetrahydroharmine, a component of ayahuasca with weak SSRI properties, has been associated with increased serotonin uptake sites and variable psychoactive effects, with preferences for higher tetrahydroharmine content reported in some ayahuasca-using churches, potentially due to differences in plant composition and preparation methods.

=== Pharmacokinetics ===
The pharmacokinetics of ayahuasca and its components have been studied and described.

=== Pharmacogenomics ===
Individual polymorphisms of the cytochrome P450-2D6 enzyme, and more over the isolated indocine metabolite from the inhabitation of CPY134a, with a varied rate of gustation due to physiological factors affect the ability of individuals to metabolize harmine.

== History ==
=== Origins ===
Ayahuasca is often portrayed as an ancient Amazonian tradition, but some anthropological and linguistic evidence suggests the brew likely spread through the western Amazon relatively recently (within the past few centuries). It may have diffused along missionary routes and the rubber trade rather than existing there for millennia.

Although several botanical specimens (like tobacco, coca and Anadenanthera spp.) were identified among the pre-Columbian objects, there is no unequivocal evidence of this date referring directly to ayahuasca. Banisteriopsis caapi use is suggested from a pouch containing carved snuffing trays, bone spatulas and other paraphernalia with traces of harmine and DMT, discovered in a cave in southwestern Bolivia in 2008, and chemical traces of harmine in the hair of two mummies found in northern Chile. Both cases are linked to Tiwanaku people, circa 900 CE. There are several reports of oral and nasal use of Anadenanthera spp. (rich in bufotenin) ritualistically and therapeutically during labor and infancy, and researchers suggest that addition of Banisteriopsis spp. to catalyze its psychoactivity emerged later, due to contact between different groups of Amazon and Altiplano.

Despite claims by numerous anthropologists and ethnologists, such as Plutarco Naranjo, regarding the millennial usage of ayahuasca, compelling evidence substantiating its pre-Columbian consumption is yet to be firmly established. As articulated by Dennis McKenna:

"No one can say for certain where the practice may have originated, and about all that can be stated with certainty is that it was already spread among numerous indigenous tribes throughout the Amazon Basin by the time Ayahuasca came to the attention of Western ethnographers in the mid-nineteenth century"

The first western references of the ayahuasca beverage dates back to seventeenth century, during the European colonization of the Americas. The earlier report is a letter from Vincente de Valverde to the Holy Office of the Inquisition. Jose Chantre y Herrera still in the seventeenth century, provided the first detailed description of a "devilish potion" cooked from bitter herbs and lianas (called ayaguasca) and its rituals:

"[...] In other nations, they set aside an entire night for divination. For this purpose, they select the most capable house in the vicinity because many people are expected to attend the event. The diviner hangs his bed in the middle and places an infernal potion, known as ayahuasca, by his side, which is particularly effective at altering one's senses. They prepare a brew from bitter vines or herbs, which, when boiled sufficiently, must become quite potent. Since it's so strong at altering one's judgment in small quantities, the precaution is not excessive, and it fits into two small pots. The witch doctor drinks a very small amount each time and knows well how many times he can sample the brew without losing his senses to properly conduct the ritual and lead the choir".

Another report produced in 1737 by the missionary Pablo Maroni, describes the use of a psychoactive liana called ayahuasca for divination in the Napo River, Ecuador:

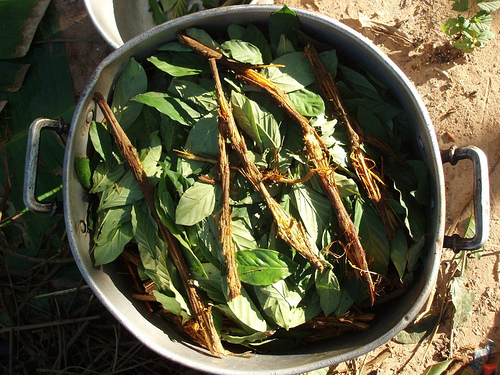
Ayahuasca cooking

"For divination, they use a beverage, some of white datura flowers, which they also call Campana due to its shape, and others from a vine commonly known as Ayahuasca, both highly effective at numbing the senses and even at taking one's life if taken in excess. They also occasionally use these substances for the treatment of common illnesses, especially headaches. So, the person who wants to divine drinks the chosen substance with certain rituals, and while deprived of their senses from the mouth downwards, to prevent the strength of the plant from harming them, they remain in this state for many hours and sometimes even two or three days until the effects run their course, and the intoxication subsides. After this, they reflect on what their imagination revealed, which occasionally remains with them for delirium. This is what they consider accomplished and propagate as an oracle."

Latter reports were produced by Juan Magnin in 1740, describing ayahuasca use as a medicinal plant by the "Jivaroan" peoples (called ayahuessa) and by Franz Xaver Veigl in 1768, that reports about several "dangerous plants", including a bitter liana used for precognition and sorcery. All these reports were written in context of Jesuit missions in South America, specially the Mainas missions, in Latin and sent only to Rome, so their audience was not very large and they were promptly lost in the archives. For this reason, ayahuasca did not receive attention for the entire subsequent century.

=== Early academic research ===
In academic discourse, the initial mention of ayahuasca dates back to Manuel Villavicencio's 1858 book, "Geografía de la República del Ecuador." This work vividly delineates the employment and rituals involving ayahuasca by the Jivaro people. Concurrently, Richard Spruce embarked on an Amazonian expedition in 1852 to collect and classify previously unidentified botanical specimens. During this journey, Spruce encountered and documented Banisteriopsis caapi (at time named Banisteria caapi) and observed an ayahuasca ceremony among the Tucano community situated along the Vaupés River. Subsequently, Spruce uncovered the usage and cultivation of B. caapi among various indigenous groups dispersed across the Amazon and Orinoco basins, like the Guahibo and Sápara. These multifarious encounters, together with Spruce's personal accounts of subjective ayahuasca experiences, were collated in his work, "Notes of a Botanist On The Amazon and Andes.". By the end of the century, other explorers and anthropologists contributed more extensive documentation concerning ayahuasca, notably the Theodor Koch-Grünberg's documents about Tucano and Arecuna's rituals and ceremonies, Stradelli's first-hand reports of ayahuasca rituals and mythology along the Jurupari and Vaupés and Alfred Simson's first description of admixture of several ingredients in the making of ayahuasca in Putumayo region, published in 1886.

In 1905, Rafael Zerda Bayón named the active extract of ayahuasca as telepathine, a name latter used by the Colombian chemist Guillermo Fischer Cárdenas when he isolated the substance in 1932. Contemporaneously, Lewin and Gunn were independently studying the properties of the banisterine, extracted of the B. caapi, and its effects on animal models. Further clinical trials were being conducted, exploring the effects of banisterine on Parkinson's disease. Later it was found that both telepathine and banisterine are the same substance, identical to a chemical already isolated from Peganum harmala and given the name Harmine.

=== Shamanism, mestizos, and vegetalistas ===
Researchers like Peter Gow and Brabec de Mori argue that ayahuasca use indeed developed alongside the Jesuit missions after the 17th century. By examining the ícaros (ayahuasca-related healing chants), they found that the chants are always sung in Quechua (a lingua franca along the Jesuit and Franciscan missions in the region), no matter the linguistic background of the group, with similar language structures between different ícaros that are markedly different from other indigenous songs. Moreover, often the cosmology of ayahuasca often mirrors the Catholicism, with particular similarities in the belief that ayahuasca is thought to be the body of ayahuascamama that is imbibed as part of the ritual, like wine and bread are taken as being the body and blood of Jesus Christ during Christian Eucharist. Brabec de Mori called this "Christian camouflage" and suggested that rather than being a way for disguising the ayahuasca ritual, it suggests that practice evolved entirely within these contexts.

Indeed, the colonial processes in Western Amazon are intrinsically related with the development of ayahuasca use in the last three centuries, as it promoted a deep reshape in traditional ways of life in the region. Many indigenous groups moved into the Missions, seeking protection from death and slavery promoted by the Bandeiras, inter-tribal violence, starvation and disease (smallpox). This movement resulted in an intense cultural exchange and resulted in the formation of mestizos (in Spanish) or caboclos (in Portuguese), a social category formed by people with mixture of European and native ancestry, who were an important part of the economy and culture of the region. According to Peter Gow, the ayahuasca shamanism (the use of ayahuasca by a trained shaman to diagnose and cure illnesses) was developed by these mestizos in the processes of colonial transformation. The Amazon rubber cycles (1879–1912 and 1942–1945) sped up these transformations, due to slavery, genocide and brutality against indigenous populations and large migratory movements, specially from the Brazilian Northeast Region as a workforce for the rubber plantations. The mestizo practices became deeply intertwined with the culture of rubber workers, called caucheros (in Spanish) or seringueiros (in Portuguese). Ayahuasca use with therapeutic goals is the main result of this Trans-cultural diffusion, with some practitioners pointing the caucheros as the main responsible for using ayahuasca to cure all sort of ailments of the body, mind and soul, with even some regions using the term Yerba de Cauchero ("rubber-worker herb"). As a result, the ayahuasca shamans in urban areas and mestizo settlements, specially in the regions of Iquitos and Pucallpa (in Peru), became the vegetalistas, folk healers who are said to gain all their knowledge from the plants and the spirits bound to it.

So the vegetalist movement was a heterogeneous mixture of Western Amazon (mestizo shamanic practices and cauchero culture) and Andean elements (shaped by other migratory movements, like those originated from Cuzco through Urubamba Valley and from western Ecuador), influenced by Christian aspects derived from the Jesuit missions, as reflected by the mythology, rituals and moral codes related to vegetalista ayahuasca use.

=== Ayahuasca religions ===
Although mestizo, vegetalista and indigenous ayahuasca use was part of a longer tradition, these several configurations of mestizo vegetalismo were not isolated phenomena. In the end of the nineteenth century, several messianic/millennialist cults sparkled across semi-urban areas across the entire Amazon region, merging different elements of indigenous and mestizo folk culture with Catholicism, Spiritism and Protestantism. In this context, the use of ayahuasca will take form of urban, organized non-indigenous religions in outskirts of main cities of northwest of Brazil, (along the basins of Madeira, Juruá and Purus River) within the cauchero/seringueiro cultural complex, resignifying and adapting both the vegetalista and mestizo shamanism to new urban formations, unifying essential elements to building a cosmology for the new emerging cult/faith, merging with elements of folk Catholicism, African-Brazilian religions and Kardecist spiritism. These new cults arise from charismatic leaderships, often messianic and prophetic, who came from rural areas after migration movements, sometimes called ayahuasqueiros, in semi-urban communities across the borders of Brazil, Bolívia and Peru (a region that will later form the state of Acre). This new configuration of these belief systems is referred by Goulart as tradição religiosa ayahuasqueira urbana amazônica ("urban-amazonian ayahuasqueiro religious tradition") or campo ayahuasqueiro brasileiro ("brazilian ayahuasqueiro field") by Labate, emerging as three main structured religions, the Santo Daime and Barquinha, in Rio Branco and the União do Vegetal (UDV) in Porto Velho, three denominations that, notwithstanding shared characteristics besides ayahuasca utilization, have several particularities regarding its practices, conceptions and processes building social legitimacy and relationships with Brazilian government, media, science and other society stances. Since the latter half of twentieth century, the ayahuasca religious expanded to other parts of Brazil and several countries in the world, notably in the West.

=== Modern use ===
Beat writer William S. Burroughs read a paper by Richard Evans Schultes on the subject and while traveling through South America in the early 1950s sought out ayahuasca in the hopes that it could relieve or cure opiate addiction (see The Yage Letters). Ayahuasca became more widely known when the McKenna brothers published their experience in the Amazon in True Hallucinations. Dennis McKenna later studied pharmacology, botany, and chemistry of ayahuasca and oo-koo-he, which became the subject of his master's thesis.

Richard Evans Schultes allowed Claudio Naranjo to make a special journey by canoe up the Amazon River to study ayahuasca with the South American Indigenous peoples. He brought back samples of the beverage and published the first scientific description of the effects of its active alkaloids.

In recent years, the brew has been popularized by Wade Davis (One River), English novelist Martin Goodman in I Was Carlos Castaneda, Chilean novelist Isabel Allende, writer Kira Salak, shaman Hamilton Souther, author Jeremy Narby (The Cosmic Serpent), author Jay Griffiths (Wild: An Elemental Journey), American novelist Steven Peck, radio personality Robin Quivers, writer Paul Theroux (Figures in a Landscape: People and Places), and NFL quarterback Aaron Rodgers.

== Society and culture ==
=== Etymology ===
Ayahuasca is the hispanicized spelling (i.e., spelled according to Spanish orthography) of a word that originates from the Quechuan languages, which are spoken in the Andean states of Ecuador, Bolivia, Peru, and Colombia. Speakers of Quechuan languages who use modern Quechuan orthography spell it ayawaska. The word refers both to the liana Banisteriopsis caapi, and to the brew prepared from it. In the Quechuan languages, aya means 'spirit, soul', or 'corpse, dead body', and waska means 'rope' or 'woody vine, liana'. The word ayahuasca has been variously translated as 'liana of the soul', 'liana of the dead', and 'spirit liana'. In the cosmovision of its users, the ayahuasca is the vine that allows the spirit to wander detached from the body, entering the spiritual world, otherwise forbidden for the alive.

==== Common names ====
Although ayahuasca is the most widely used term in Peru, Bolivia, Ecuador and Brazil, the brew is known by many names throughout northern South America:

- hoasca or oasca in Brazil
- yagé (or yajé, from the Cofán language or iagê in Portuguese). Relatively widespread use in Andean and Amazonian regions throughout the border areas of Colombia, Peru, Ecuador and Brazil. The Cofán people also use the word oofa.
- caapi (or kahpi/gahpi in Tupi–Guarani language or *kaapi in proto-Arawak language), used to address both the brew and the B. caapi itself. Meaning "weed" or "thin leaf", it was the word utilized by Spruce for naming the liana.
- pinde (or pindê/pilde), used by the Colorado people
- patem (or nátema), from the Chicham languages
- shori, mii (or miiyagi) and uni, from the Yaminawa language
- nishi cobin, from the Shipibo language
- nixi pae, shuri, ondi, rambi and rame, from the Kashinawa language
- kaji, kadana and kadanapira, used by the Tucano people
- kamarampi (or kamalampi) and hananeroca, from the Arawakan languages
- bakko, from Bora-Muinane languages
- jono pase, used by Ese'Ejja people
- uipa, from Guahibo language
- napa (or nepe/nepi), used by Tsáchila people
- Biaxije, from Kamëntšá language
- Cipó ("liana") or Vegetal, in Portuguese language, used by União do Vegetal church members
- Daime or Santo Daime, meaning "give me" in Portuguese, the term was coined by Santo Daime's founder Mestre Irineu in the 1940s, from a prayer dai-me alegria, dai-me resistência ("give me happiness, give me strength"). Daime members also uses the words Luz ("light") or Santa Luz ("holy light")
- Some nomenclature are created by the cultural and symbolic signification of ayahuasca, with names like planta professora ("plant teacher"), professor dos professores ("teacher of the teachers"), sagrada medicina ("holy medicine") or la purga ("the purge").

===== Other names in the Western world =====
In the last decades, two new important terminologies emerged. Both are commonly used in the Western world in neoshamanic, recreative or pharmaceutical contexts to address ayahuasca-like substances created without the traditional botanical species, due to it being expensive and/or hard to find in these countries. These concepts are surrounded by some controversies involving ethnobotany, patents, commodification and biopiracy:

- Anahuasca (ayahuasca analogue or variants). A term usually used to refer to the ayahuasca produced with other plant species as sources of DMT (e.g., Mimosa hostilis) or β-carbolines (e.g., Peganum harmala).
- Pharmahuasca (pharmaceutical ayahuasca). This indicates the pills produced from freebase DMT, synthetic harmaline, MAOI medications (such as moclobemide) and other isolated or purified compounds or extracts.

=== Legal status ===
Internationally, DMT is a Schedule I drug under the Convention on Psychotropic Substances. The Commentary on the Convention on Psychotropic Substances notes, however, that the plants containing it are not subject to international control:

The cultivation of plants from which psychotropic substances are obtained is not controlled by the Vienna Convention... Neither the crown (fruit, mescal button) of the Peyote cactus nor the roots of the plant Mimosa hostilis nor Psilocybe mushrooms themselves are included in Schedule I, but only their respective principals, mescaline, DMT, and psilocin.

In Peru, ayahuasca is legal and formally protected as part of the country's cultural heritage. When ratifying the 1971 Convention on Psychotropic Substances, Peru entered a reservation to exclude Ayahuasca and San Pedro from international control, citing their traditional ritual use by Amazonian peoples (United Nations Treaty Collection, 1971). This position was reinforced on 24 June 2008, when the Instituto Nacional de Cultura declared the traditional knowledge and ceremonial use of Ayahuasca by Indigenous communities as Patrimonio Cultural de la Nación (Cultural Heritage of the Nation).

A fax from the Secretary of the International Narcotics Control Board (INCB) to the Netherlands Ministry of Public Health sent in 2001 goes on to state that "Consequently, preparations (e.g. decoctions) made of these plants, including ayahuasca, are not under international control and, therefore, not subject to any of the articles of the 1971 Convention."

Despite the INCB's 2001 affirmation that ayahuasca is not subject to drug control by international convention, in its 2010 Annual Report the Board recommended that governments consider controlling (i.e. criminalizing) ayahuasca at the national level. This recommendation by the INCB has been criticized as an attempt by the Board to overstep its legitimate mandate and as establishing a reason for governments to violate the human rights (i.e., religious freedom) of ceremonial ayahuasca drinkers.

Under American federal law, DMT is a Schedule I drug that is illegal to possess or consume; however, certain religious groups have been legally permitted to consume ayahuasca. A court case allowing the União do Vegetal to import and use the tea for religious purposes in the United States, Gonzales v. O Centro Espírita Beneficente União do Vegetal, was heard by the U.S. Supreme Court on November 1, 2005; the decision, released February 21, 2006, allows the UDV to use the tea in its ceremonies pursuant to the Religious Freedom Restoration Act. In a similar case in Ashland, Oregon-based Santo Daime church sued for their right to import and consume ayahuasca tea. In March 2009, U.S. District Court Judge Panner ruled in favor of the Santo Daime, acknowledging its protection from prosecution under the Religious Freedom Restoration Act.

In 2017 the Santo Daime Church Céu do Montréal in Canada received religious exemption to use ayahuasca as a sacrament in their rituals.

Religious use in Brazil was legalized after two official inquiries into the tea in the mid-1980s, which concluded that ayahuasca is not a recreational drug and has valid spiritual uses.

In France, Santo Daime won a court case allowing them to use the tea in early 2005; however, they were not allowed an exception for religious purposes, but rather for the simple reason that they did not perform chemical extractions to end up with pure DMT and harmala and the plants used were not scheduled. Four months after the court victory, the common ingredients of ayahuasca as well as harmala were declared stupéfiants, or narcotic schedule I substances, making the tea and its ingredients illegal to use or possess.

In June 2019, Oakland, California, decriminalized natural entheogens. The City Council passed the resolution in a unanimous vote, ending the investigation and imposition of criminal penalties for use and possession of entheogens derived from plants or fungi. The resolution states: "Practices with Entheogenic Plants have long existed and have been considered to be sacred to human cultures and human interrelationships with nature for thousands of years, and continue to be enhanced and improved to this day by religious and spiritual leaders, practicing professionals, mentors, and healers throughout the world, many of whom have been forced underground." In January 2020, Santa Cruz, California, and in September 2020, Ann Arbor, Michigan, decriminalized natural entheogens.

=== Intellectual property issues ===
Ayahuasca has stirred debate regarding intellectual property protection of traditional knowledge. In 1986 the US Patent and Trademarks Office (PTO) allowed the granting of a patent on the ayahuasca vine B. caapi. It allowed this patent based on the assumption that ayahuasca's properties had not been previously described in writing. Several public interest groups, including the Coordinating Body of Indigenous Organizations of the Amazon Basin (COICA) and the Coalition for Amazonian Peoples and Their Environment (Amazon Coalition) objected. In 1999 they brought a legal challenge to this patent which had granted a private US citizen "ownership" of the knowledge of a plant that is well-known and sacred to many Indigenous peoples of the Amazon, and used by them in religious and healing ceremonies.

Later that year the PTO issued a decision rejecting the patent, on the basis that the petitioners' arguments that the plant was not "distinctive or novel" were valid; however, the decision did not acknowledge the argument that the plant's religious or cultural values prohibited a patent. In 2001, after an appeal by the patent holder, the US Patent Office reinstated the patent, albeit to only a specific plant and its asexually reproduced offspring. The law at the time did not allow a third party such as COICA to participate in that part of the reexamination process. The patent, held by American entrepreneur Loren Miller, expired in 2003.

== Research ==
Ayahuasca may have significant therapeutic effects for mood disorders (Hedges' g of -1.34 in 7 articles covering heterogenous indications); it generally causes few lasting adverse effects.

== See also ==
- Legal status of ayahuasca by country
- List of substances used in rituals
- Andrew Gallimore
- Changa
- Dimethyltryptamine/harmine
- Dimethyltryptamine/β-carbolines
- German Amazon-Jary-Expedition (1935–1937)
- Ibogaine
- Icaro
- Kambo (drug)
- Yachay
