= Harmala alkaloid =

Group of chemical compounds

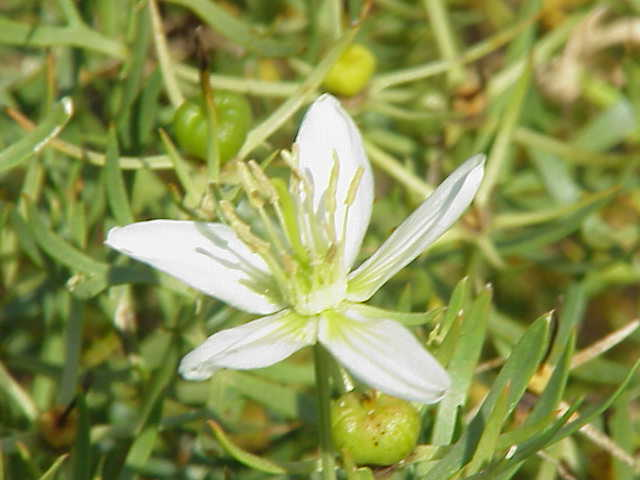
Peganum harmala, commonly known as Syrian rue

Harmala alkaloids are several alkaloids that act as monoamine oxidase inhibitors (MAOIs). These alkaloids are found in the seeds of Peganum harmala (also known as harmal or Syrian rue), as well as Banisteriopsis caapi (ayahuasca), leaves of tobacco and coffee beans.

The alkaloids include harmine, harmaline, harmalol, and their derivatives, which have similar chemical structures, hence the name "harmala alkaloids". These alkaloids are of interest for their use in Amazonian shamanism, where they are derived from other plants. Harmine, once known as telepathine and banisterine, is a naturally occurring β-carboline alkaloid that is structurally related to harmaline, and also found in the vine Banisteriopsis caapi. Tetrahydroharmine is also found in B. caapi and P. harmala. Alexander Shulgin has suggested that harmine may be a breakdown product of harmaline. Harmine and harmaline are reversible inhibitors of monoamine oxidase A (RIMAs). They can stimulate the central nervous system by inhibiting the metabolism of monoamine compounds such as serotonin and norepinephrine in the case of MAO-As and dopamine in the case of MAO-Bs.

The harmala alkaloids occur in Peganum harmala in concentrations of roughly 3%, though tests have documented anywhere from 2–7% or even higher, as natural sources tend to vary widely in chemical makeup. Harmala alkaloids are also found in the Banisteriopsis caapi vine, the key plant ingredient in the sacramental beverage ayahuasca, in concentrations that range between 0.31 and 8.43% for harmine, 0.03–0.83% for harmaline and 0.05–2.94% for tetrahydroharmine. Although other psychoactive plants are occasionally added to ayahuasca to achieve visionary states of consciousness, the recipes vary greatly and no single combination is common. Peganum harmala, normally consumed as a tea or used as an incense, is mentioned in classical Persian literature both as a sacred sacrament and as a medicine. The harmala alkaloids are not especially psychedelic, even at higher dosages, when hypnagogic visions, alongside vomiting and diarrhea, become the main effect.

Harmala alkaloids are also found in many other plants, such as Passiflora. The leaves of P. incarnata have been reported variously to give 0.005%, 0.12%, and 0% harmala alkaloids.

== Telepathine ==
Telepathine was originally thought to be the active chemical constituent of Banisteriopsis caapi, a key plant ingredient in the preparation of ayahuasca; a sacramental beverage from the Amazon. This isolated chemical was so named because of the reported effects of ayahuasca among the indigenous users, including: collective contact with and/or visions of jaguars, snakes, and jeweled birds, and ancestral spirits; the ability to see future events; and as the name suggests, telepathic communication among tribal members. It was assumed to be a newly discovered chemical at the time, however, it was soon realized that telepathine was already more widely known as "harmine" from its previous discovery in Peganum harmala (Syrian rue).

== Use and effects ==
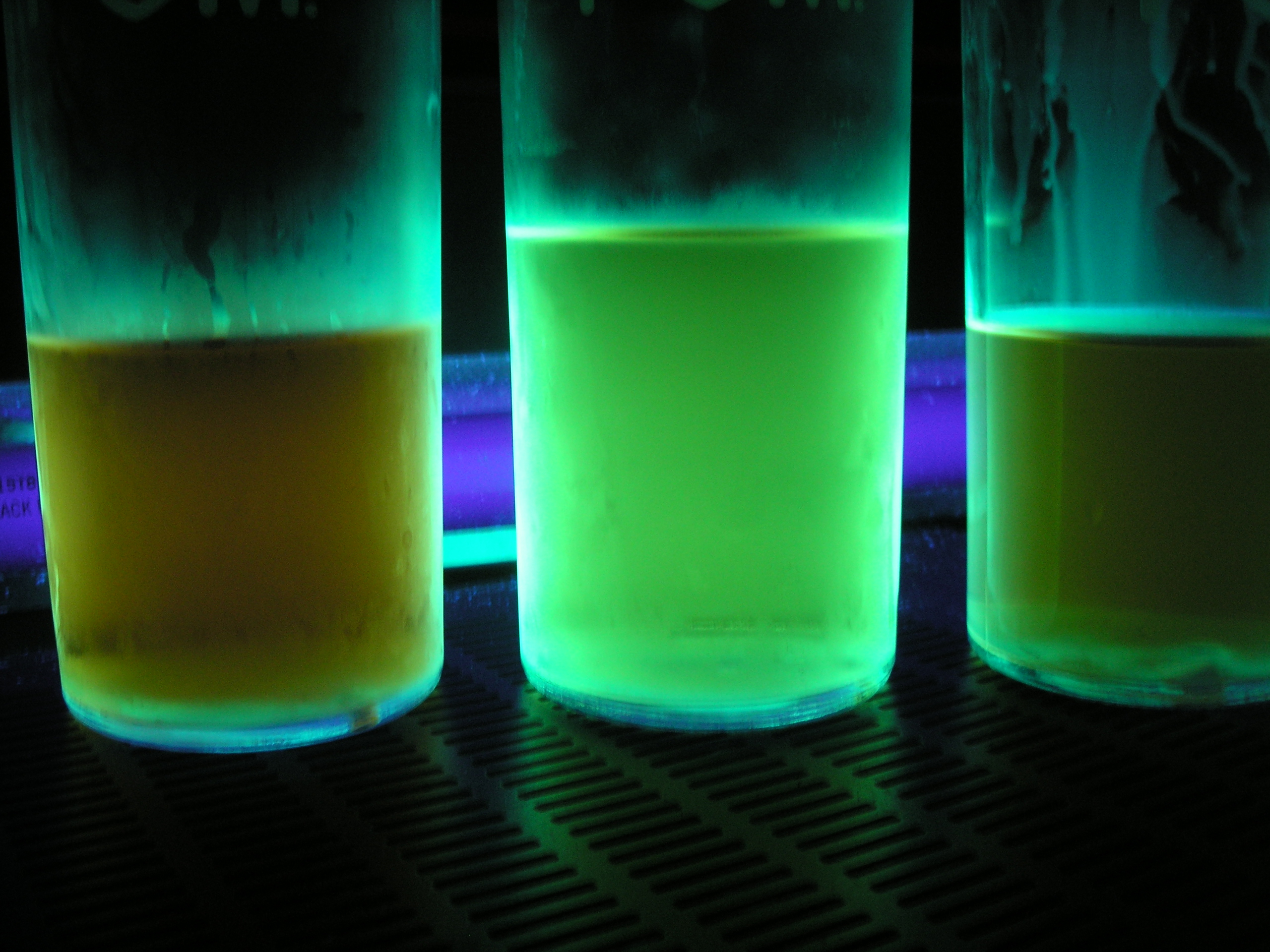
Harmaline and harmine fluorescence under ultraviolet light. These three extractions indicate that the middle one has a higher concentration of the two compounds.

Various harmala alkaloids such as harmaline have hallucinogenic effects and have been referred to as oneirogens.

As mentioned above, some harmala alkaloids can be used as a monoamine oxidase inhibitor (MAOI) to facilitate the ingestion of dimethyltryptamine (DMT) and other tryptamines; while not generally used as a hallucinogen alone, there are reports of such use. In high doses, it acts as purgative. Harmala alkaloids from Banisteriopsis caapi have been used to treat Parkinson's disease. As a benzodiazepine site inverse agonist, harmala alkaloids are used as a model for essential tremor (ET) when injected to animals. Rats being treated with harmaline exhibit severe tremors after 5–7 minutes. Individuals diagnosed with essential tremor have been found to have elevated blood levels of harmala alkaloids.

Harmala alkaloids interact with smoked cannabis when either smoked/vaporized, or taken orally as an extract or as a tea. Reports are scarce, but generally users experience more intense cannabis-like effects, as well as mild psychedelic effects such as hallucinations, ego dissolution, and increased emotions, especially in large doses.

Unlike MAOIs such as phenelzine, harmine and harmaline are reversible and selective meaning they do not have nearly as high a risk for "cheese syndrome" caused by consuming tyramine-containing foods, which is a risk associated with monoamine oxidase A inhibitors, but not monoamine oxidase B inhibitors. Both MAO-A and MAO-B break down tyramine, but large doses of harmala alkaloids begin to affect MAO-B as well.

Oral doses and durations of β-carbolines or harmala alkaloids
Compound	Chemical name	Dose (hallucinogen)	Potency	Dose (MAOI)	Duration
Harman	1-Methyl-β-carboline	>250 mg	Unknown	>250 mg	Unknown
Harmine	7-Methoxyharman	>300 mg	≤50%	140–250 mg	6–8 hours
Harmaline	7-Methoxy-3,4-dihydroharman	150–400 mg	100%	70–150 mg	5–8 hours
Tetrahydroharmine	7-Methoxy-1,2,3,4-tetrahydroharman	≥300 mg	~33%	Unknown	Unknown
6-Methoxyharmalan	6-Methoxy-3,4-dihydroharman	~100 mg	~150%	Unknown	Unknown
6-MeO-THH	6-Methoxy-1,2,3,4-tetrahydroharman	≥100 mg	~50%	Unknown	Unknown
P. harmala seeds	–	≥5–28 g^{a}	–	3–5 g^{a}	Unknown
Footnotes: ^{a} = P. harmala seeds in ground form. They contain 2–7% harmala alkaloids, with 1 teaspoon ≈ 3 g ≈ 60–180 mg alkaloids; 1 tablespoon ≈ 9 g ≈ 200–600 mg alkaloids; and 1 large (OO) gelatin capsule ≈ 0.7 g ≈ 15–45 mg alkaloids. For comparison, B. caapi contains 0.05–1.95% (average 0.45%) harmala alkaloids. Note: Harmine and other β-carbolines have also been tested by non-oral routes such as sublingual, subcutaneous injection, intramuscular injection, and intravenous injection. Refs: See template page.

== Pharmacology ==
Harmala alkaloids act as reversible monoamine oxidase inhibitors (MAOIs), specifically of monoamine oxidase A (MAO-A). They also have other activities, such as interactions with serotonin 5-HT_{2} receptors. Harmaline and the serotonergic psychedelic DOM substitute for one another in rodent drug discrimination tests. However, harmala alkaloids are inactive as serotonin 5-HT_{2A} receptor agonists.

Isolated harmine was found to exhibit a cytotoxic effect on HL60 and K562 leukemic cell lines. This action might explain the previously observed cytotoxic effect of P. harmala on these cancer cells."

== Society and culture ==
=== Legal status ===
==== Australia ====
Harmala alkaloids are considered Schedule 9 prohibited substances under the Poisons Standard (October 2015). A Schedule 9 substance is a substance which may be abused or misused, the manufacture, possession, sale or use of which should be prohibited by law except when required for medical or scientific research, or for analytical, teaching or training purposes with approval of Commonwealth and/or State or Territory Health Authorities.

Exceptions are made when in herbs, or preparations, for therapeutic use such as: (a) containing 0.1 per cent or less of harmala alkaloids; or (b) in divided preparations containing 2 mg or less of harmala alkaloids per recommended daily dose.

== List of harmala alkaloids ==
Name	Chemical Formula	Chemical Name	Structure
Harmine	C_{13}H_{12}N_{2}O	7-Methoxy-1-methyl-9H-pyrido[3,4-b]indole	
Harmaline	C_{13}H_{14}N_{2}O	4,9-Dihydro-7-methoxy-1-methyl-3H-pyrido[3,4-b]indole	
Harmalol	C_{12}H_{12}N_{2}O	1-Methyl-4,9-dihydro-3H-pyrido[3,4-b]indol-7-ol	
Tetrahydroharmine	C_{13}H_{16}N_{2}O	1,2,3,4-Tetrahydroharmine	
Harmalan	C_{12}H_{10}N_{2}	1-Methyl-3,4-dihydro-β-carboline	
6-Methoxyharman (isoharmine)	C_{13}H_{12}N_{2}O	6-Methoxy-1-methyl-β-carboline	
Harmine acid methyl ester	C_{15}H_{18}N_{2}O_{3}	Methyl 7-methoxy-β-carboline-1-carboxylate	
Harmilinic acid	?	7-Methoxy-3,4-dihydro-β-carboline-1-carboxylic acid	
Harmanamide	?	1-Carbamoyl-7-methoxy-β-carboline	
Acetylnorharmine	?	1-Acetyl-7-methoxy-β-carboline	
Harmalacidine	?	7-Methoxy-2,3,4,9-tetrahydro-1H-β-carbolin-1-one	
Brevicolline	C17H19N3	1-methyl-4-[(2S)-1-methylpyrrolidin-2-yl]-9H-pyrido[3,4-b]indole	

== See also ==
- Substituted β-carboline
- Harmane
- Monoamine oxidase inhibitor
- Reversible inhibitor of monoamine oxidase A (RIMA)
- Nicotiana rustica (Aztec tobacco)
- Iboga-type alkaloid and ibogalog
- Substituted tetrahydroisoquinoline
- Dimethyltryptamine/harmine
- Dimethyltryptamine/β-carbolines
