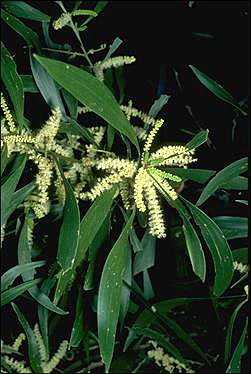

Conservation status
- Least Concern (IUCN 3.1)

Scientific classification
- Kingdom: Plantae
- Clade: Tracheophytes
- Clade: Angiosperms
- Clade: Eudicots
- Clade: Rosids
- Order: Fabales
- Family: Fabaceae
- Subfamily: Caesalpinioideae
- Clade: Mimosoid clade
- Genus: Acacia
- Species: A. maidenii

Binomial name
- Acacia maidenii F.Muell.
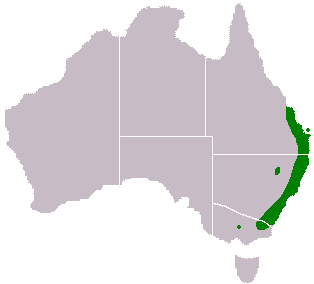
- Native range of Acacia maidenii

Synonyms
- Acacia maidenii F.Muell. isonym; Racosperma maidenii (F.Muell.) Pedley

= Acacia maidenii =

Species of legume

Acacia maidenii, commonly known as Maiden's wattle, is a species of flowering plant in the family Fabaceae and is endemic to eastern Australia. It is a tree with smooth bark, glabrous or sparsely hairy branchlets, very narrowly elliptic, elliptic or oblong, usually sickle-shaped phyllodes, spikes of white to cream or pale yellow flowers, and twisted or curled, leathery to crusty pods.

== Description ==
Acacia maidenii is a tree that typically grows to a height of 5–20 m (16–66 ft) and has smooth bark, grey or grey-brown on older stems. Its branchlets are glabrous, sometimes with a few soft hairs pressed against the surface, the new shoots glabrous with a few white or golden hairs. The phyllodes are very narrowly elliptic, elliptic or oblong, sickle-shaped or sometimes straight, 100–200 mm (3.9–7.9 in) long, mostly 6–25 mm (0.24–0.98 in) wide and papery to thinly leathery with one to five prominent longitudinal veins and an inconspicuous gland 6–10 mm (0.24–0.39 in) above the pulvinus. The flowers are borne in racemes of spikes 25–60 mm (0.98–2.36 in) long on hairy peduncles 1–4 mm (0.039–0.157 in) long, the flowers loosely arranged and white to cream or pale yellow. Flowering mostly occurs from January to June, and the pods are variably twisted, or curled into loose spirals, more or less terete, 50–140 mm (2.0–5.5 in) long, 2.5–4 mm (0.098–0.157 in) wide, and leathery or crusty. The seeds are oblong to broadly elliptic, 4–5.5 mm (0.16–0.22 in) long and dark brown with an orange aril.

== Taxonomy ==
Acacia maidenii was first formally described in 1892 by Ferdinand von Mueller in the journal Botanisches Centralblatt. The specific epithet (maidenii) honours Joseph Henry Maiden.

== Distribution and habitat ==
Maiden's wattle usually grows in more fertile soils, sometimes in soils derived from basalt, and often on the edges of littoral rainforest, from Prosperpine in Queensland through eastern New South Wales to Orbost in Victoria. In New South Wales it is found on the coast and ranges and as far west as Jenolan Caves and Murrurundi. In Victoria, the species is restricted to roadsides and near-coastal rises near Orbost.

== Use in horticulture ==
This species of wattle makes an attractive ornamental tree. It prefers full sun to partial shade with an ample supply of water. Propagation is from scarified seed.

== Gallery ==
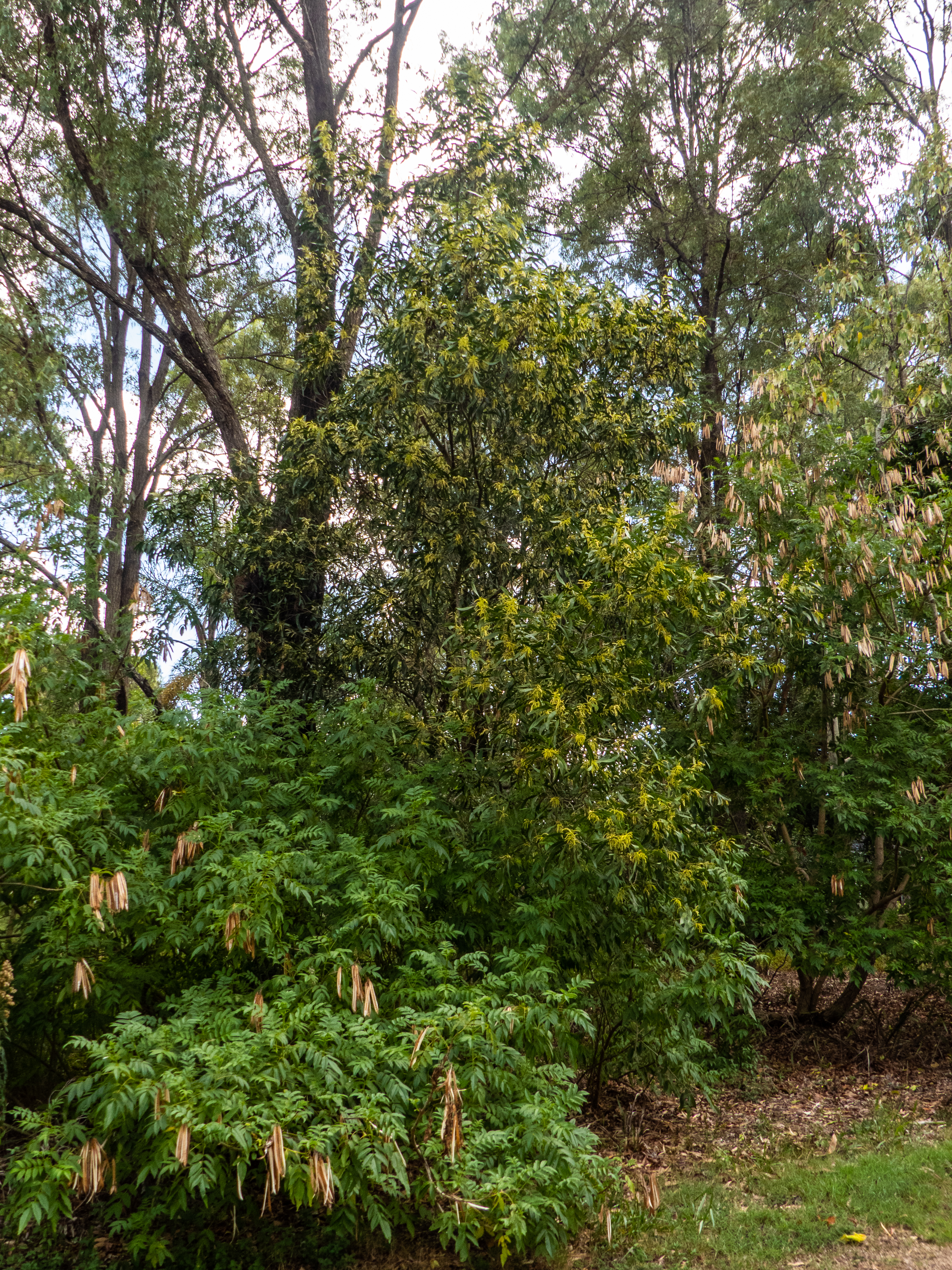
Habit.

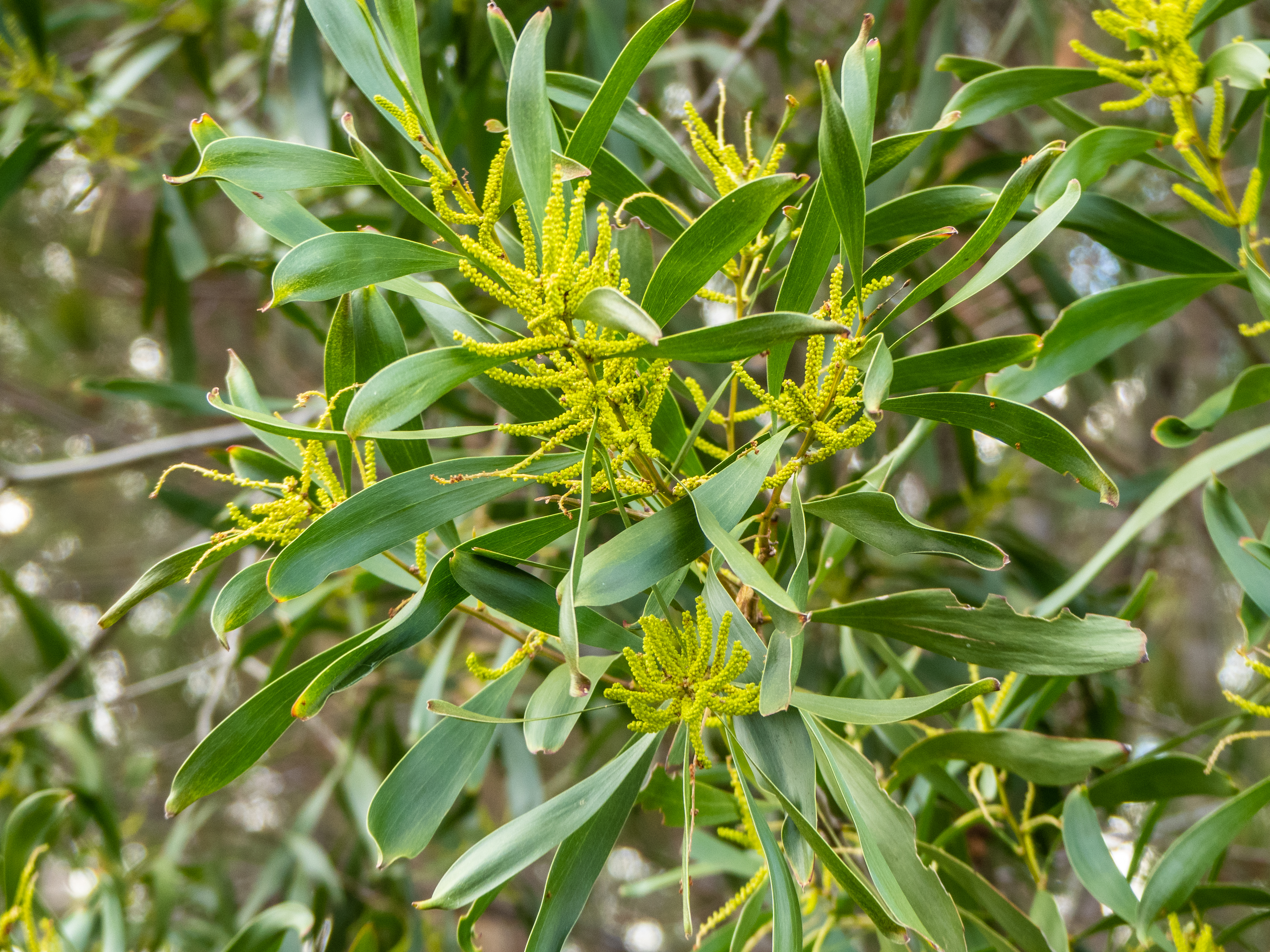
Flower buds.

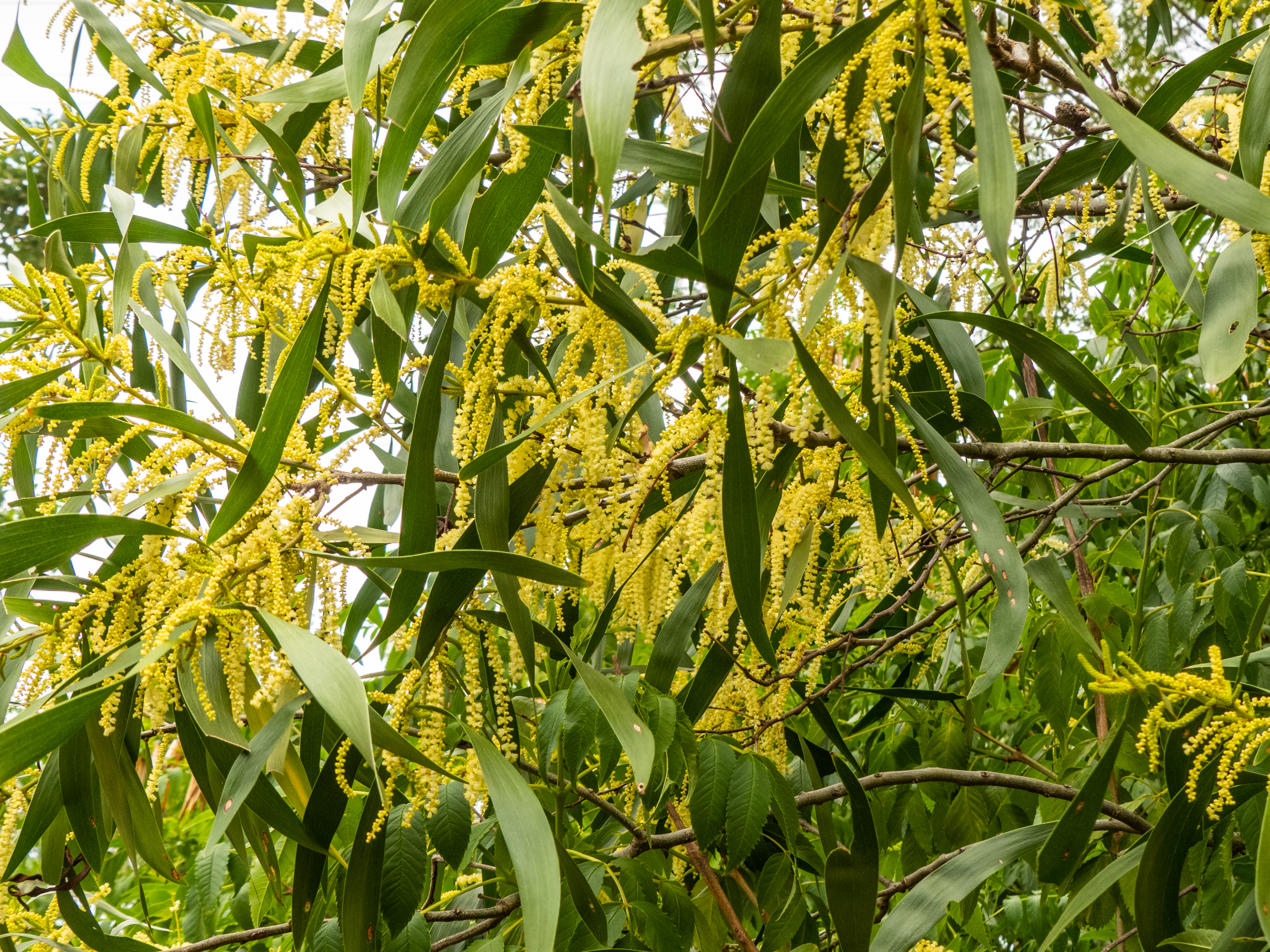
Flowers

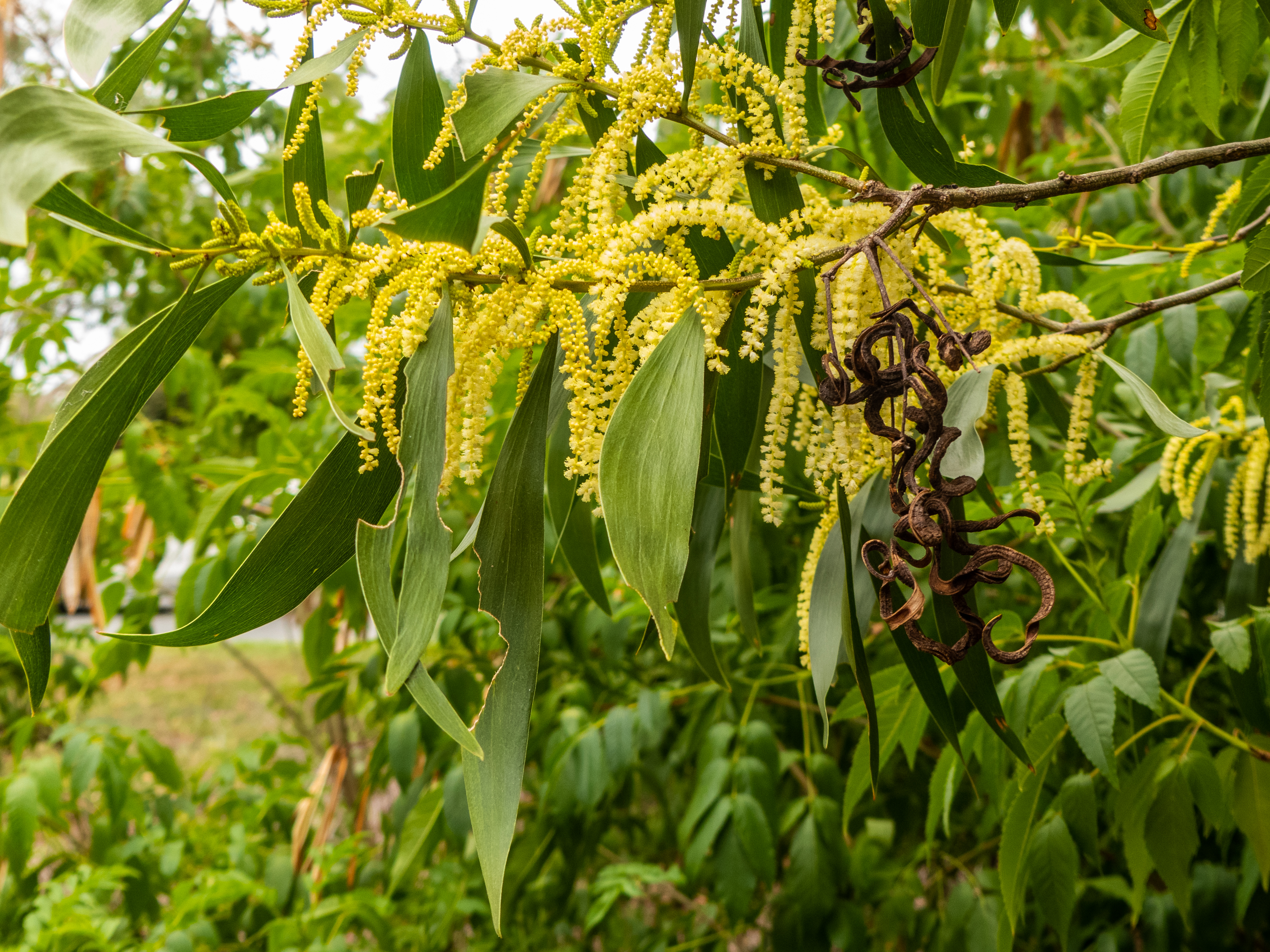
Pods
