= Harmaline =

Chemical compound

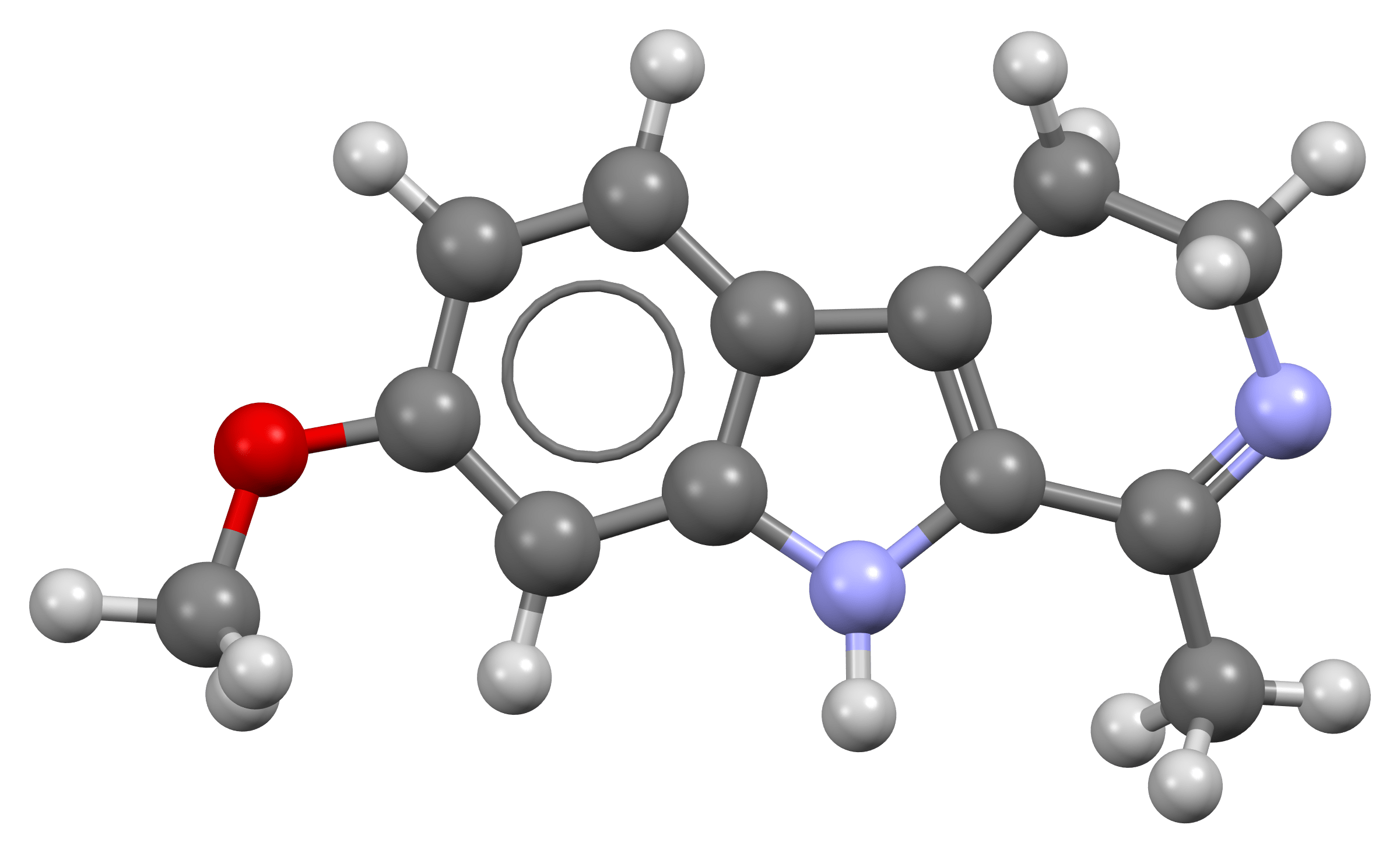

Clinical data
- Other names: 7-Methoxyharmalan; 7-MeO-harmalan; 7-OMe-harmalan; 7-Methoxy-3,4-dihydroharman; 3,4-Dihydroharmine; 3,4-Dihydro-7-methoxy-1-methyl-β-carboline; Harmadine
- Routes of administration: Oral, intravenous
- Drug class: Hallucinogen; Oneirogen; Monoamine oxidase inhibitor; Reversible inhibitor of MAO-A
- ATC code: None

Legal status
- Legal status: AU: S9 (Prohibited substance); CA: Schedule III

Pharmacokinetic data
- Onset of action: Oral: 1–2 hours IV: Seconds
- Elimination half-life: 2 hours
- Duration of action: Oral: 5–8 hours IV: "Much shorter" (than oral)

Identifiers
- IUPAC name: 7-methoxy-1-methyl-4,9-dihydro-3H-pyrido[3,4-b]indole
- CAS Number: 304-21-2
- PubChem CID: 5280951
- ChemSpider: 10211258
- UNII: CN58I4TOET
- KEGG: C06536
- ChEBI: CHEBI:28172
- ChEMBL: ChEMBL340807
- CompTox Dashboard (EPA): DTXSID8041038
- ECHA InfoCard: 100.005.594

Chemical and physical data
- Formula: C_{13}H_{14}N_{2}O
- Molar mass: 214.268 g·mol^{−1}
- 3D model (JSmol): Interactive image
- Melting point: 232 to 234 °C (450 to 453 °F)
- SMILES: COc3ccc2c1CCN=C(C)c1[nH]c2c3
- InChI: InChI=1S/C13H14N2O/c1-8-13-11(5-6-14-8)10-4-3-9(16-2)7-12(10)15-13/h3-4,7,15H,5-6H2,1-2H3; Key:RERZNCLIYCABFS-UHFFFAOYSA-N

Harmaline, also known as 7-methoxyharmalan or as 3,4-dihydro-7-methoxy-1-methyl-β-carboline, is a harmala alkaloid and β-carboline which has hallucinogenic effects and monoamine oxidase inhibitor (MAOI) activity. It is the partly hydrogenated form of harmine.

Plants containing harmaline are combined in ayahuasca to inhibit monoamine oxidase (MAO), allowing orally consumed dimethyltryptamine (DMT) to become orally active and produce psychoactive effects. Harmala alkaloids, including harmaline, are psychoactive on their own in humans, with harmaline being particularly hallucinogenic, although other compounds such as harmine and tetrahydroharmine (THH) have also been reported to produce hallucinogenic effects as well.

Harmaline is present in Peganum harmala (Syrian rue). Syrian rue seeds contain about 3% harmala alkaloids by dry weight. Harmaline was first isolated from plants in 1841, its chemical structure identified in 1919, and it was first synthesized in 1927.

== Use and effects ==
=== As a hallucinogen ===
The harmala alkaloids are psychoactive in humans. According to Alexander Shulgin, harmaline is the only harmala alkaloid that has a reputation of being hallucinogenic. However, other harmala alkaloids and β-carbolines, like harmine, THH, 6-methoxyharmalan, and 6-methoxytetrahydroharman, have also been reported to be hallucinogenic. Harmaline produces vivid dream-like visual effects and physical discomfort at doses of 150 to 400 mg orally or 70 to 100 mg intravenously, often leading users to seek solitude in a quiet, dark environment. The hallucinogenic effects of harmaline and other β-carbolines are said to be qualitatively distinct from and unlike those of serotonergic psychedelics like LSD but similar to those of ibogaine. Taken orally, the onset of harmaline is 1 to 2 hours, peak effects occur after around 2 hours, and its duration is 5 to 8 hours. Conversely, its onset by intravenous injection is within seconds and its duration is much shorter by this route than with oral administration.

=== As a MAOI ===
Harmaline is a MAOI, or more specifically a reversible inhibitor of monoamine oxidase A (RIMA). The effective doses for this activity are 70 to 150 mg orally.

Harmaline-containing plants and tryptamine-containing plants are used in ayahuasca brews. The inhibitory effects on monoamine oxidase A (MAO-A) allows DMT, the psychoactively prominent chemical in the mixture, to bypass the extensive first-pass metabolism it undergoes upon ingestion, allowing a psychologically active quantity of the chemical to exist in the brain for a perceivable period of time.

Besides DMT, harmaline has also been used to inhibit the metabolism of and thereby potentiate 5-MeO-DMT, which like DMT is otherwise orally inactive and has a very short duration. However, unlike with DMT, combination of 5-MeO-DMT with MAOIs can also result in accidental overdose, including instances of serotonin syndrome and death.

== Interactions ==
Harmaline is a RIMA. This means that the risk of a hypertensive crisis, a dangerous high blood pressure crisis from eating tyramine-rich foods such as cheese, is likely lower with harmaline than with irreversible MAOIs such as phenelzine. Since harmaline is a RIMA, it could, in theory, induce both serotonin syndrome and hypertensive crises in combination with tyramine, serotonergics, catecholaminergics drugs or prodrugs.

== Pharmacology ==
=== Pharmacodynamics ===
Harmaline activities
| Target | Affinity (K_{i}, nM) |
|---|---|
| 5-HT_{1A} | >10,000 (rat/human) |
| 5-HT_{1B} | >10,000 |
| 5-HT_{1D} | >10,000 |
| 5-HT_{1E} | ND |
| 5-HT_{1F} | ND |
| 5-HT_{2A} | 5,010–7,790 (K_{i}) (rat) >20,000–100,000 (EC_{50}) >10,000 (IC_{50}) |
| 5-HT_{2B} | ND |
| 5-HT_{2C} | 9,430 (rat) |
| 5-HT_{3} | >10,000 |
| 5-HT_{4} | ND |
| 5-HT_{5A} | >10,000 |
| 5-HT_{6} | 1,480 |
| 5-HT_{7} | 5,500 |
| α_{1A} | >10,000 |
| α_{1B} | >10,000 |
| α_{1D} | ND |
| α_{2A} | 2,540 |
| α_{2B} | 1,130 |
| α_{2C} | 810 |
| β_{1}, β_{2} | >10,000 |
| β_{3} | ND |
| D_{1}–D_{5} | >10,000 (human/rat) |
| H_{1}–H_{4} | ND |
| M_{1}–M_{5} | >10,000 |
| I_{1} | 13,800 |
| I_{2} | 22 |
| σ | 510–3,850 (mouse) |
| σ_{1} | 5,447 (guinea pig) |
| σ_{2} | 19,816 (rat) |
| MOR | >100,000 (bovine) |
| DOR | >100,000 (bovine) |
| DOR | >100,000 (bovine) |
| TAAR1 | ND |
| BDZ | >10,000 (rat) |
| PCP | >10,000 (rat) |
| SERT | >10,000 (K_{i}); 15,000 (IC_{50}) (mouse) |
| NET | 3,260 (K_{i}) |
| DAT | >10,000 (K_{i}) (bovine) |
| MAO-A | 2.5–33 (IC_{50}) |
| MAO-B | 100,000 (IC_{50}) |
| DYRK1A | 4,600 (IC_{50}) |
Notes: The smaller the value, the more avidly the drug binds to the site. All proteins are human unless otherwise specified. Refs:

Harmaline shows weak but significant affinity for the serotonin 5-HT_{2A} and 5-HT_{2C} receptors in the low micromolar range. However, in contrast to serotonergic psychedelics, harmaline and other β-carbolines do not activate the serotonin 5-HT_{2A} receptor even at very high concentrations in vitro (20,000–100,000 nM). Harmaline shows high affinity for the imidazoline I_{2} receptor (K_{i} = 22 nM). Unlike ibogaine and noribogaine, harmaline does not bind to the κ-opioid receptor or other opioid receptors.

Harmaline and the psychedelic DOM partially substitute for each other in rodent drug discrimination tests. Harmaline was much more effective in substituting for DOM than harman and harmine, which did not achieve significant generalization and produced behavioral disruption at higher doses. On the other hand, harmaline and 6-methoxyharman were comparable in terms of DOM substitution. Unlike serotonergic psychedelics, ibogaine and harmala alkaloids like harmaline do not cause pupil dilation or increase blood pressure in humans.

Harmaline and ibogaine have both been found to produce neurotoxicity against Purkinje cells in the cerebellum in rats that is mediated by upstream olivocerebellar pathway activation. This may explain long-lasting motor deficits induced by ibogaine in these rats. However, this phenomenon involves high doses of ibogaine and has not been observed with ibogaine in primates or humans. In any case, the rodent findings are notable in that they further suggest that harmaline and ibogaine share a common mechanism of action. Harmaline-induced tremors in rodents have been linked to upregulation of the serotonin transporter (SERT) in the cerebellum and consequent reduced serotonin levels in this area and increased Purkinje cell excitability.

=== Pharmacokinetics ===
The elimination half-life of harmaline has been reported to be about 2 hours.

== Chemistry ==
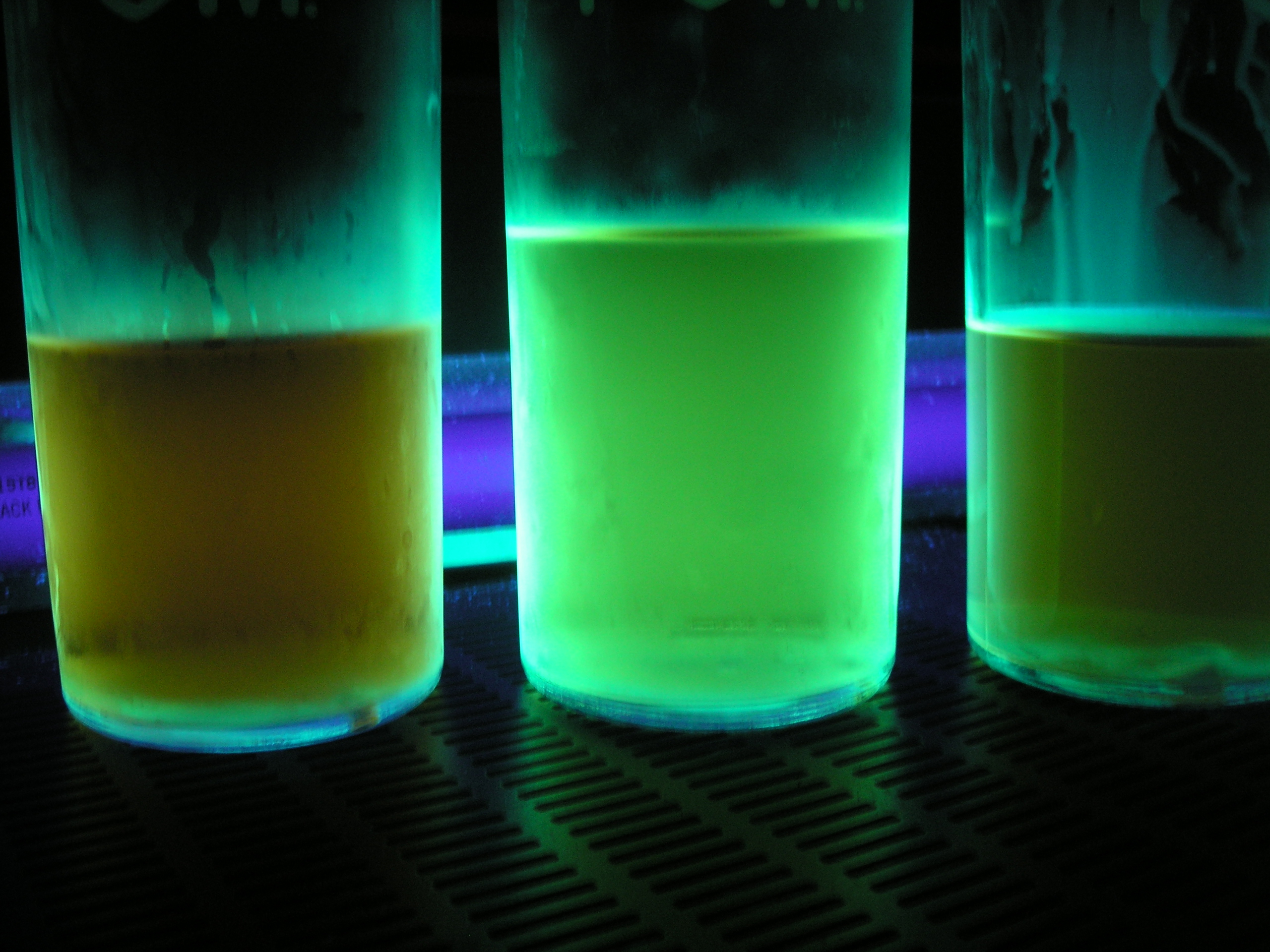
Harmaline and harmine fluoresce under ultraviolet light. These three extractions indicate that the middle one has a higher concentration of the two compounds.

Harmaline, also known as 7-methoxyharmalan or 3,4-dihydro-7-methoxy-1-methyl-β-carboline, is a β-carboline and a cyclized tryptamine analogue of 6-methoxy-DMT.

=== Properties ===
It is fluorescent under ultraviolet light.

=== Synthesis ===
The chemical synthesis of harmaline has been described.

=== Analogues ===
Analogues of harmaline include harmine, tetrahydroharmine, harmalol, 5-methoxyharmalan, 6-methoxyharmalan, and ibogamine, among others.

== Natural occurrence ==
Various plants contain harmaline including Peganum harmala (Syrian rue) as well as the hallucinogenic beverage ayahuasca, which is traditionally brewed using Banisteriopsis caapi. Present at 3% by dry weight, the harmala alkaloids may be extracted from the Syrian rue seeds.

== History ==
Harmaline was first isolated from plants in 1841. The chemical structure of harmaline was not correctly identified until either 1919 or 1927. Harmaline was first synthesized by Richard Manske in 1927.

== Society and culture ==
=== Legal status ===
==== Australia ====
Harmala alkaloids are considered Schedule 9 prohibited substances under the Poisons Standard (October 2015). A Schedule 9 substance is a substance which may be abused or misused, the manufacture, possession, sale or use of which should be prohibited by law except when required for medical or scientific research, or for analytical, teaching or training purposes with approval of Commonwealth and/or State or Territory Health Authorities.

==== Canada ====
Harmaline and Harmalol are considered Schedule III controlled substances by the Controlled Drugs and Substances Act. Every person found to be in possession of a Schedule III drug is guilty of an indictable offence and liable to imprisonment for a term not exceeding three years; or for a first offence, guilty on summary conviction, to a fine not exceeding one thousand dollars or to imprisonment for a term not exceeding six months, or to both. Every person found to be trafficking a Schedule III drug is guilty of an indictable offence and liable to imprisonment for a term not exceeding ten years, or is guilty on summary conviction (first-time offenders) and liable to imprisonment for a term not exceeding eighteen months.

== See also ==
- Substituted β-carboline
- Harmala alkaloid
