= Harmine =

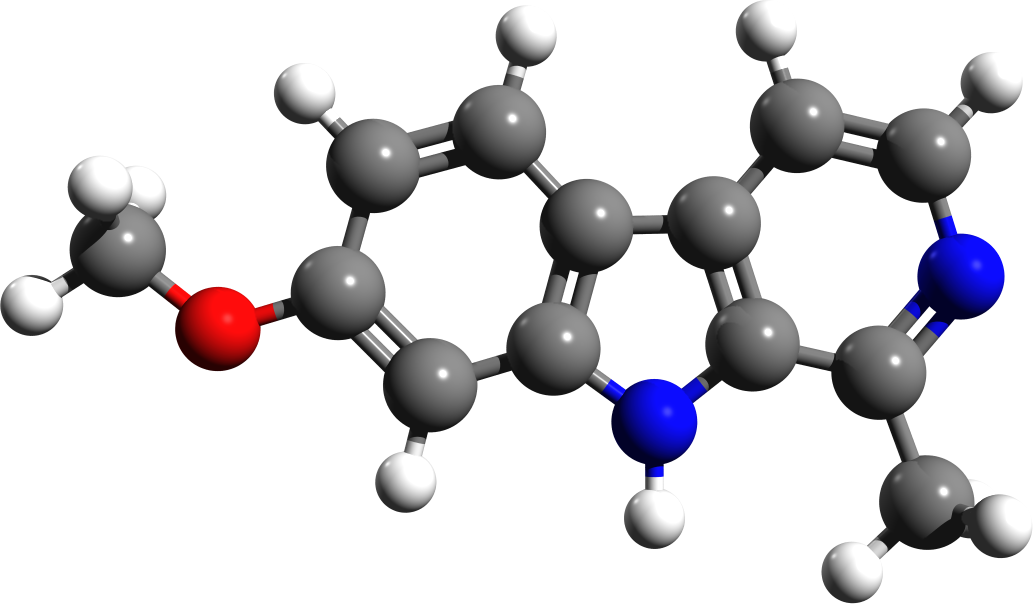

Clinical data
- Other names: Banisterine; Leucoharmine; Telepathine; Yageine; 7-Methoxyharman; 7-Methoxy-1-methyl-β-carboline
- Routes of administration: Oral, sublingual, subcutaneous injection, intramuscular injection, intravenous injection
- Drug class: Hallucinogen; Oneirogen; Reversible inhibitor of monoamine oxidase A
- ATC code: None

Pharmacokinetic data
- Onset of action: Unknown
- Elimination half-life: 1.3–1.9 hours (1–3 hours)
- Duration of action: Oral: 6–8 hours IM: 3–5 hours IV: 30–45 minutes

Identifiers
- IUPAC name: 7-methoxy-1-methyl-9H-pyrido[3,4-b]indole
- CAS Number: 442-51-3
- PubChem CID: 5280953
- DrugBank: DB07919
- ChemSpider: 4444445
- UNII: 4FHH5G48T7
- KEGG: C06538
- ChEBI: CHEBI:28121
- ChEMBL: ChEMBL269538
- CompTox Dashboard (EPA): DTXSID30196066
- ECHA InfoCard: 100.006.485

Chemical and physical data
- Formula: C_{13}H_{12}N_{2}O
- Molar mass: 212.252 g·mol^{−1}
- 3D model (JSmol): Interactive image
- Density: 1.326 g/cm^{3} g/cm^{3}
- Melting point: 321 °C (610 °F) (·HCl); 262 °C (·HCl·2H_{2}O)
- Solubility in water: insoluble mg/mL (20 °C)
- SMILES: COc1ccc2c(c1)[nH]c3c(C)nccc23
- InChI: InChI=1S/C13H12N2O/c1-8-13-11(5-6-14-8)10-4-3-9(16-2)7-12(10)15-13/h3-7,15H,1-2H3; Key:BXNJHAXVSOCGBA-UHFFFAOYSA-N

Harmine, also known as banisterine or telepathine, as well as 7-methoxyharman or 7-methoxy-1-methyl-β-carboline, is a β-carboline and a harmala alkaloid which has hallucinogenic effects and monoamine oxidase inhibitor (MAOI) activity. It occurs in a number of different plants, most notably Peganum harmala and Banisteriopsis caapi. Harmine reversibly inhibits monoamine oxidase A (MAO-A), an enzyme which breaks down monoamines, making it a reversible inhibitor of monoamine oxidase A (RIMA). Harmine does not inhibit MAO-B.

Harmine is found in various plants—including tobacco, Passiflora species, lemon balm, and several Banisteriopsis species—as well as in some butterflies of the Nymphalidae family. It was first isolated and named by German chemist Julius Fritzsche in 1847 from Peganum harmala seeds, later identified in Banisteriopsis caapi under various names, with its structure determined in 1927.

The biosynthesis of harmine likely begins with L-tryptophan, which is decarboxylated to tryptamine—an intermediate also used in serotonin synthesis—before undergoing a series of reactions to form harmine, with feeding experiments supporting tryptamine’s role as an intermediate rather than a primary precursor. It is essential for enabling the oral activity of DMT in ayahuasca and is also used as a fluorescent pH indicator and in PET imaging to study MAO-A-related brain disorders.

Pharmaceutical-grade harmine hydrochloride is safe and well-tolerated at oral doses below 2.7 mg/kg in healthy adults, with higher doses causing mild to moderate gastrointestinal and neurological side effects and limited psychoactive effects. Recent patents focus on creating harmine derivatives with reduced toxicity.

== Use and effects ==
=== Hallucinogen ===
Harmine is a hallucinogen at reported doses of 25 to 75 mg subcutaneously, 150 to 200 mg intravenously, and 300 mg or more orally. However, in other reports, hallucinogenic effects were minimal at doses of up to 960 mg orally and 750 mg sublingually. In a modern clinical trial, harmine given orally did not produce hallucinogenic effects in humans at doses of up to 300 mg. The effects of harmine include euphoria, hallucinogenic effects, confusion, drowsiness, sleepiness, perceptual disturbances, closed-eye visuals, vertigo, lightheadedness, ataxia, speech impairment, and unpleasantness. The hallucinogenic effects of harmine and other β-carbolines are said to be qualitatively distinct from and unlike those of serotonergic psychedelics like LSD but similar to those of ibogaine. Along with harmaline and tetrahydroharmine, harmine is one of the psychoactive constituents of Banisteriopsis caapi. These other constituents, particularly harmaline, may be the more relevant hallucinogenic constituents of this plant. The onset of harmine is not described, whereas its duration by oral administration is 6 to 8 hours, by intramuscular injection is 3 to 5 hours, and by intravenous injection is 30 to 45 minutes.

=== Monoamine oxidase inhibitor ===
Harmine is a reversible inhibitor of monoamine oxidase A (RIMA), a type of monoamine oxidase inhibitor (MAOI) as it reversibly inhibits monoamine oxidase A (MAO-A), but not monoamine oxidase B (MAO-B). Doses of harmine that are active as a RIMA in combination with dimethyltryptamine (DMT) are in the range of 140 to 190 mg orally, whereas smaller doses in the range of 120 to 140 mg were ineffective. However, its RIMA activity at the preceding effective doses was described as significant but modest. Oral or intravenous harmine doses ranging from 30 to 300 mg may cause agitation, bradycardia or tachycardia, blurred vision, hypotension, and paresthesias.

Medically significant amounts of harmine occur in the plants Syrian rue and Banisteriopsis caapi. These plants also contain notable amounts of harmaline, which is also a RIMA. The psychoactive ayahuasca brew is made from B. caapi stem bark usually in combination with dimethyltryptamine (DMT) containing Psychotria viridis leaves. DMT is a psychedelic drug, but it is not orally active unless it is ingested with MAOIs. This makes harmine a vital component of the ayahuasca brew with regard to its ability to induce a psychedelic experience. Syrian rue or synthetic harmine is sometimes used to substitute B. caapi in the oral use of DMT.

Harmine was used or investigated as an antiparkinsonian medication since the late 1920s until the early 1950s. It was replaced by other medications.

=== Other uses ===
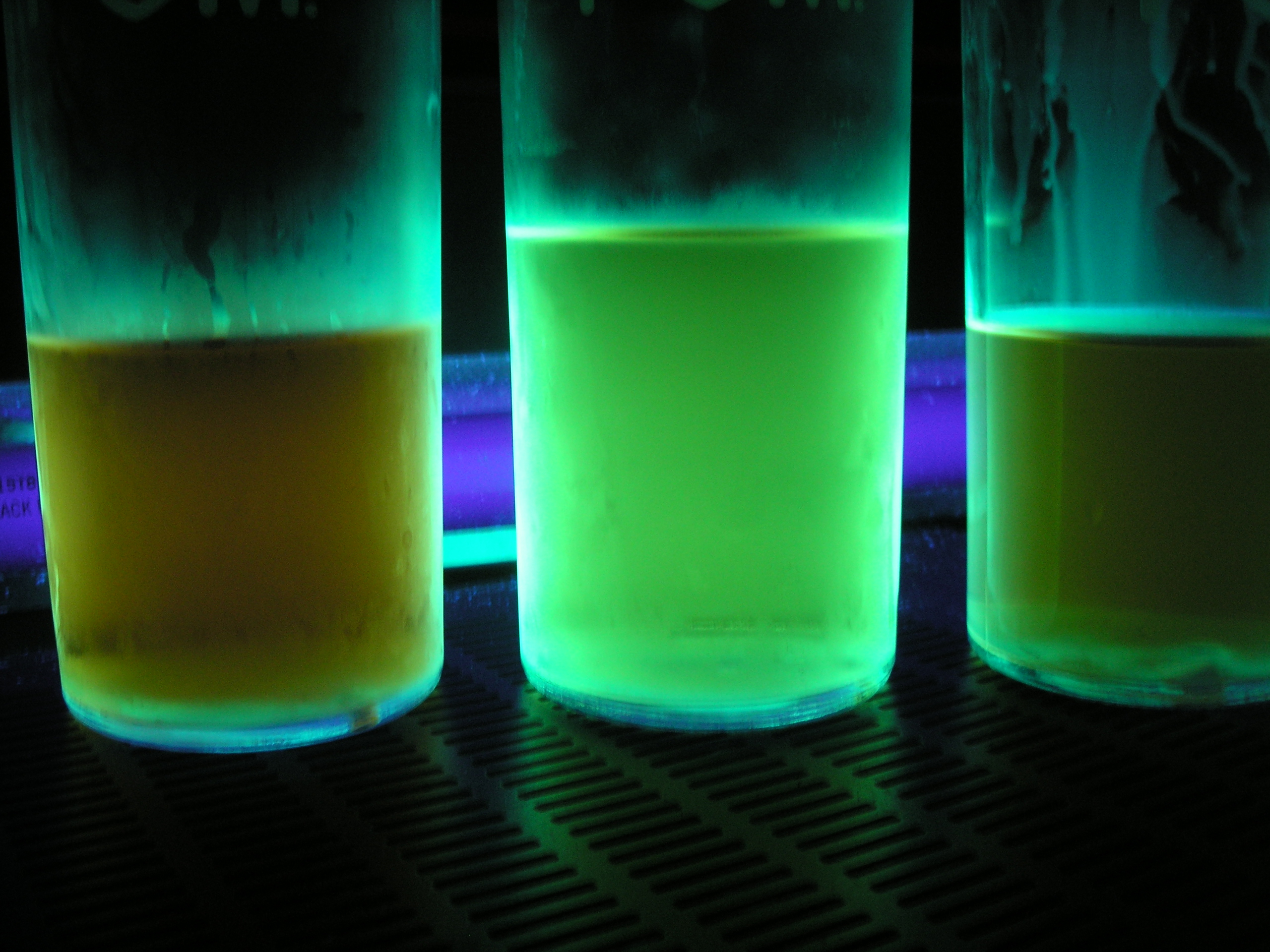
Harmaline and harmine fluoresce under ultraviolet light. These three extractions indicate that the middle one has a higher concentration of the two compounds.

Harmine is a useful fluorescent pH indicator. As the pH of its local environment increases, the fluorescence emission of harmine decreases.

Due to its MAO-A specific binding, carbon-11 labeled harmine can be used in positron emission tomography to study MAO-A dysregulation in several psychiatric and neurologic illnesses.

== Adverse effects ==
A 2024 Phase 1 clinical trial investigating pharmaceutical-grade harmine hydrochloride in healthy adults found that the maximum tolerated dose (MTD) is approximately 2.7 mg/kg body weight.

Below this threshold, harmine is generally well-tolerated with minimal adverse effects. Above 2.7 mg/kg, common adverse effects include nausea and vomiting, which typically occur 60–90 minutes after ingestion. Other reported effects include drowsiness, dizziness, and impaired concentration. These effects are generally mild to moderate in severity and resolve within several hours.

No serious adverse cardiovascular effects were observed at any dose tested (up to 500 mg), though rare instances of transient hypotension occurred during episodes of vomiting. Unlike some traditional preparations containing harmine (such as Ayahuasca), pure harmine did not cause diarrhea in study participants.

The study found that adverse effects were more common in participants with lower body weight when given fixed doses, leading the researchers to conclude that 2.7 mg/kg represents a more useful threshold than fixed dosing.

== Pharmacology ==
=== Pharmacodynamics ===
Harmine activities
Target	Affinity (K_{i}, nM)
5-HT_{1A}	>10,000
5-HT_{1B}	ND
5-HT_{1D}	>10,000 (calf/pig)
5-HT_{1E}	ND
5-HT_{1F}	ND
5-HT_{2A}	230–397 (rat)
5-HT_{2B}	ND
5-HT_{2C}	5,340 (rat)
5-HT_{3}	ND
5-HT_{4}	ND
5-HT_{5A}	ND
5-HT_{6}	ND
5-HT_{7}	ND
α_{1A}–α_{1D}	ND
α_{2}	>10,000 (rat)
α_{2A}–α_{2C}	ND
β_{1}–β_{3}	ND
D_{1}	ND
D_{2}	>10,000
D_{3}–D_{5}	ND
H_{1}–H_{4}	ND
M_{1}–M_{5}	ND
I_{1}	629 (IC_{50})
I_{2}	10
σ_{1}, σ_{2}	ND
MOR	>100,000 (bovine)
DOR	>100,000 (bovine)
DOR	>100,000 (bovine)
TAAR1	ND
BDZ	>10,000 (rat)
PCP	ND
SERT	11,000–41,000 (IC_{50}) (mouse)
NET	22,000 (IC_{50}) (mouse)
DAT	12,000 (IC_{50})
MAO-A	1.0–16.9 (K_{i}); 1.0–380 (IC_{50})
MAO-B	120,800 (K_{i}); ND (IC_{50})
DYRK1A	12–700 (IC_{50})
Notes: The smaller the value, the more avidly the drug binds to the site. All proteins are human unless otherwise specified. Refs:

The pharmacology of harmine has been studied. It showed affinity (K_{i}) for the serotonin 5-HT_{2A} receptor (K_{i} = 230–397 nM) and for the serotonin 5-HT_{2C} receptor (K_{i} = 5,340 nM), but not for the serotonin 5-HT_{1A} receptor, the dopamine D_{2} receptor, or the benzodiazepine site of the GABA_{A} receptor (all K_{i} = >10,000 nM). The drug showed among the highest affinity for the serotonin 5-HT_{2A} receptor of any other β-carboline, with a few exceptions. However, in contrast to serotonergic psychedelics, harmine has been found to be inactive as an agonist of the serotonin 5-HT_{2A} receptor. In addition, other β-carbolines like harmaline did not activate the serotonin 5-HT_{2A} receptor in terms of PI hydrolysis even at very high concentrations in vitro. Harmine has been found to be antagonistic to serotonin in certain tissues similarly to LSD. Harmine has been found to increase dopamine release in the nucleus accumbens in a serotonin 5-HT_{2A} receptor-dependent manner as evidenced by reversal by ketanserin, but this may instead be via indirect serotonin 5-HT_{2A} receptor activation.

Harmine has also shown affinity for the imidazoline I_{2} receptor (K_{i} = 10 nM). It has been suggested that this action might be involved in or responsible for its hallucinogenic effects. The drug is a potent inhibitor of DYRK1A (K_{i} or IC_{50} = 33–700 nM) and a very weak dopamine reuptake inhibitor (IC_{50} = 12,000 nM). Conversely, it is not a dopamine transporter (DAT) substrate or dopamine releasing agent. Harmine is a highly potent inhibitor of monoamine oxidase A (MAO-A) (K_{i} = 16.9 nM, IC_{50} = 2.0–380 nM). It shows 10,000-fold selectivity for MAO-A over monoamine oxidase B (MAO-B). Unlike ibogaine and noribogaine, harmine does not bind to the κ-opioid receptor or other opioid receptors.

In contrast to harmaline and 6-methoxyharmalan, which fully substituted for the psychedelic drug DOM in rodent drug discrimination tests, but similarly to harmane, harmine failed to significantly substitute for DOM and produced behavioral disruption at higher doses. Similarly, harmine did not produce the head-twitch response, a behavioral proxy of psychedelic effects, in rodents. However, in a subsequent study, harmine did produce the head-twitch response. In addition, as with other MAOIs, harmine can potentiate the head-twitch response induced by 5-hydroxytryptophan (5-HTP).

=== Pharmacokinetics ===
The pharmacokinetics of harmine have been studied and described. The plasma elimination half-life of harmine is about 1.3 to 1.9 hours or with a range of 1 to 3 hours.

== Chemistry ==
Harmine, also known as 7-methoxy-1-methyl-β-carboline, is a substituted β-carboline and cyclized tryptamine derivative. Analogues of harmine include harmaline and tetrahydroharmine, among others. A positional isomer of harmine is 6-methoxyharman and analogues of that isomer include 6-methoxyharmalan and 6-methoxytetrahydroharmine (6-MeO-THH).

=== Synthesis ===
The chemical synthesis of harmine has been described.

== Natural occurrence ==
Harmine is found in a wide variety of different organisms, most of which are plants.

Alexander Shulgin lists about thirty different species known to contain harmine, including seven species of butterfly in the family Nymphalidae.

The harmine-containing plants include tobacco, Peganum harmala, two species of passiflora, and numerous others. Lemon balm (Melissa officinalis) contains harmine.

In addition to B. caapi, at least three members of the Malpighiaceae contain harmine, including two more Banisteriopsis species and the plant Callaeum antifebrile. Callaway, Brito and Neves (2005) found harmine levels of 0.31–8.43% in B. caapi samples.

The family Zygophyllaceae, which P. harmala belongs to, contains at least two other harmine-bearing plants: Peganum nigellastrum and Zygophyllum fabago.

=== Biosynthesis ===
The coincident occurrence of β-carboline alkaloids and serotonin in Peganum harmala indicates the presence of two very similar, interrelated biosynthetic pathways, which makes it difficult to definitively identify whether free tryptamine or L-tryptophan is the precursor in the biosynthesis of harmine. However, it is postulated that L-tryptophan is the most likely precursor, with tryptamine existing as an intermediate in the pathway.

The following figure shows the proposed biosynthetic scheme for harmine. The Shikimate acid pathway yields the aromatic amino acid, L-tryptophan. Decarboxylation of L-tryptophan by aromatic L-amino acid decarboxylase (AADC) produces tryptamine (I), which contains a nucleophilic center at the C-2 carbon of the indole ring due to the adjacent nitrogen atom that enables the participation in a Mannich-type reaction. Rearrangements enable the formation of a Schiff base from tryptamine, which then reacts with pyruvate in II to form a β-carboline carboxylic acid. The β-carboline carboxylic acid subsequently undergoes decarboxylation to produce 1-methyl β-carboline III. Hydroxylation followed by methylation in IV yields harmaline. The order of O-methylation and hydroxylation have been shown to be inconsequential to the formation of the harmaline intermediate. In the last step V, the oxidation of harmaline is accompanied by the loss of water and effectively generates harmine.

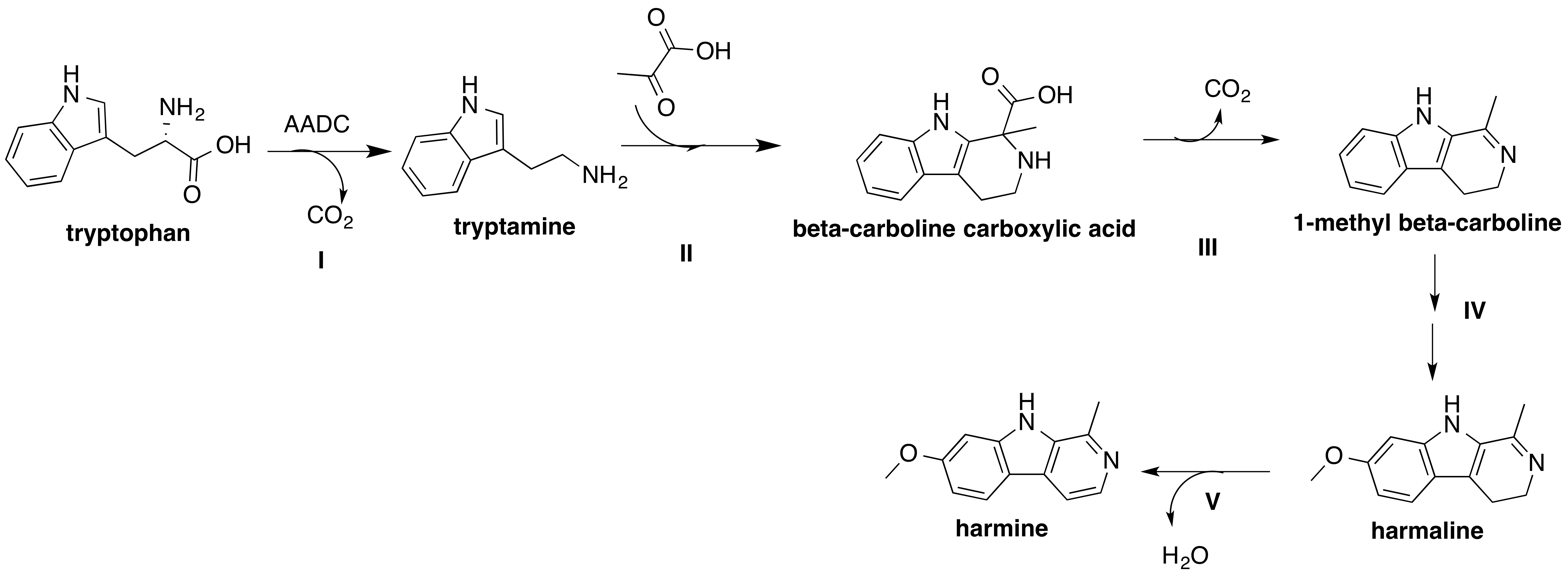
Proposed biosynthesis of harmine from L-tryptophan

The difficulty distinguishing between L-tryptophan and free tryptamine as the precursor of harmine biosynthesis originates from the presence of the serotonin biosynthetic pathway, which closely resembles that of harmine, yet necessitates the availability of free tryptamine as its precursor. As such, it is unclear if the decarboxylation of L-tryptophan, or the incorporation of pyruvate into the basic tryptamine structure is the first step of harmine biosynthesis. However, feeding experiments involving the feeding of one of tryptamine to hairy root cultures of P. harmala showed that the feeding of tryptamine yielded a great increase in serotonin levels with little to no effect on β-carboline levels, confirming that tryptamine is the precursor for serotonin, and indicating that it is likely only an intermediate in the biosynthesis of harmine; otherwise, comparable increases in harmine levels would have been observed.

== History ==
J. Fritzsche was the first to isolate and name harmine. He isolated it from the husks of Peganum harmala seeds in 1848. The related harmaline was already isolated and named by Fr. Göbel in 1837 from the same plant. The pharmacology of harmine was not studied in detail until 1895. The structures of harmine and harmaline were determined in 1927 by Richard Manske and colleagues.

In 1905, the Colombian naturalist and chemist, Rafael Zerda-Bayón suggested the name telepathine to the then unknown hallucinogenic ingredient in ayahuasca brew. "Telepathine" comes from "telepathy", as Zerda-Bayón believed that ayahuasca induced telepathic visions. In 1923, the Colombian chemist, Guillermo Fischer-Cárdenas was the first to isolate harmine from Banisteriopsis caapi, which is an important herbal component of ayahuasca brew. He called the isolated harmine "telepathine". This was solely to honor Zerda-Bayón, as Fischer-Cárdenas found that telepathine had only mild non-hallucinogenic effects in humans. In 1925, Barriga Villalba, professor of chemistry at the University of Bogotá, isolated harmine from B. caapi, but named it "yajéine", which in some texts is written as "yageine". In 1927, F. Elger, who was a chemist working at Hoffmann-La Roche, isolated harmine from B. caapi. With the assistance of Professor Robert Robinson in Manchester, Elger showed that harmine (which was already isolated in 1848) was identical with telepathine and yajéine. In 1928, Louis Lewin isolated harmine from B. caapi, and named it "banisterine", but this supposedly novel compound was soon also shown to be harmine. Lewin, in 1928, was the first to describe the subjective effects of harmine in the literature.

Harmine was first patented by Jialin Wu and others who invented ways to produce new harmine derivatives with enhanced antitumor activity and lower toxicity to human nervous cells.

== Society and culture ==
=== Names ===
Harmine is the most common name of the compound. It is also known by other names including banisterine, banisterin, telepathine, telopathin, leucoharmine, yagin, and yageine, among others.

=== Legal status ===
==== Australia ====
Harmala alkaloids are considered Schedule 9 prohibited substances under the Poisons Standard (October 2015). A Schedule 9 substance is a substance which may be abused or misused, the manufacture, possession, sale or use of which should be prohibited by law except when required for medical or scientific research, or for analytical, teaching or training purposes with approval of Commonwealth and/or State or Territory Health Authorities.

Exceptions are made when in herbs, or preparations, for therapeutic use such as: (a) containing 0.1 per cent or less of harmala alkaloids; or (b) in divided preparations containing 2 mg or less of harmala alkaloids per recommended daily dose.

==== Canada ====
Harmine is not a controlled substance in Canada as of 2025.

== Research ==
=== Pancreatic islet cell proliferation ===
Harmine is currently the only known drug that induces proliferation (rapid mitosis and subsequent mass growth) of pancreatic alpha (α) and beta (β) cells in adult humans. These islet sub-cells are normally resistant to growth stimulation in the adult stage of a human's life, as the cell mass plateaus at around age 10 and remains virtually unchanged.

== See also ==
- Substituted β-carboline
- Harmala alkaloid
- Dimethyltryptamine/harmine
- Dimethyltryptamine/β-carbolines
