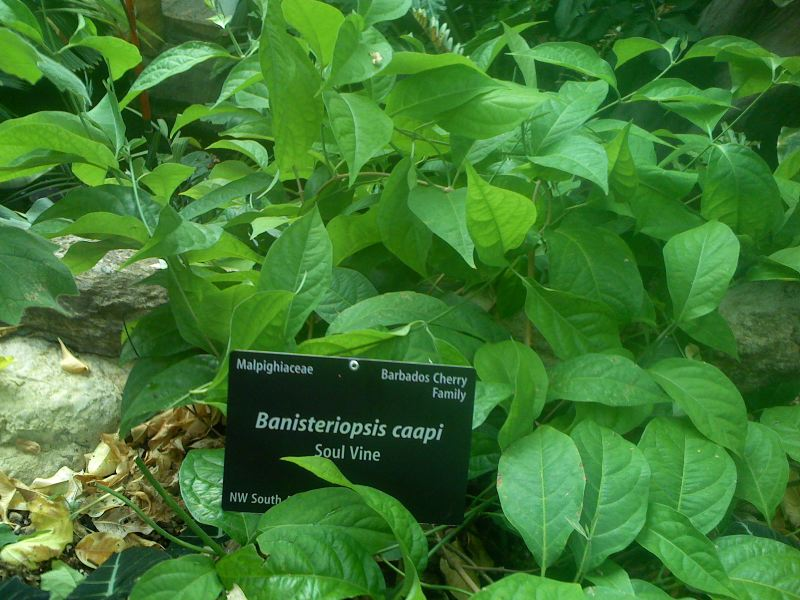
- Young B. caapi

Scientific classification
- Kingdom: Plantae
- Clade: Tracheophytes
- Clade: Angiosperms
- Clade: Eudicots
- Clade: Rosids
- Order: Malpighiales
- Family: Malpighiaceae
- Genus: Banisteriopsis
- Species: B. caapi

Binomial name
- Banisteriopsis caapi (Spruce ex Griseb.) C.V.Morton

Synonyms
- List: Banisteria caapi Spruce ex Griseb.; Banisteria inebrians (C.V.Morton) J.F.Macbr.; Banisteria quitensis Nied.; Banisteriopsis inebrians Morton; Banisteriopsis quitensis (Nied.) Morton

= Banisteriopsis caapi =

Species of plant

Banisteriopsis caapi, also known as caapi, soul vine, yagé (yage), or ayahuasca (the latter of which also refers to the psychedelic decoction made with the vine and a plant source of dimethyltryptamine), is a South American liana of the family Malpighiaceae. It is commonly used as an ingredient of ayahuasca, a decoction with a long history of its entheogenic use and holds status as a "plant teacher" among the Indigenous peoples of the Amazon rainforest.

It was used by Indigenous peoples of South America for centuries, but it was first documented by Europeans in the 16th century and formally identified by botanist Richard Spruce in 1851. According to The CRC World Dictionary of Plant Names by Umberto Quattrocchi, the naming of the genus Banisteriopsis was dedicated to John Banister, a 17th-century English clergyman and naturalist. An earlier name for the genus was Banisteria, and the plant is sometimes referred to as Banisteria caapi. Its other names include Banisteria quitensis, Banisteriopsis inebrians, and Banisteriopsis quitensis.

It is a giant vine that can grow up to 30 m (98 ft) long, with pale flowers that bloom infrequently and resemble related species like Banisteriopsis membranifolia and B. muricata. It contains beta-carboline alkaloids and polyphenols.

Its legal status varies by country; it is largely unregulated in the United States (with specific religious exemptions for use of the ayahuasca decoction), ambiguously legal in Canada and parts of Australia, and effectively illegal in France, despite past religious use rulings.

== Description ==
Caapi is a giant vine with characteristic 12–14 mm (0.5–0.6 in) white or pale pink flowers, which most commonly appear in January, but are known to bloom infrequently. It resembles B. membranifolia and B. muricata, both of which are related to caapi.

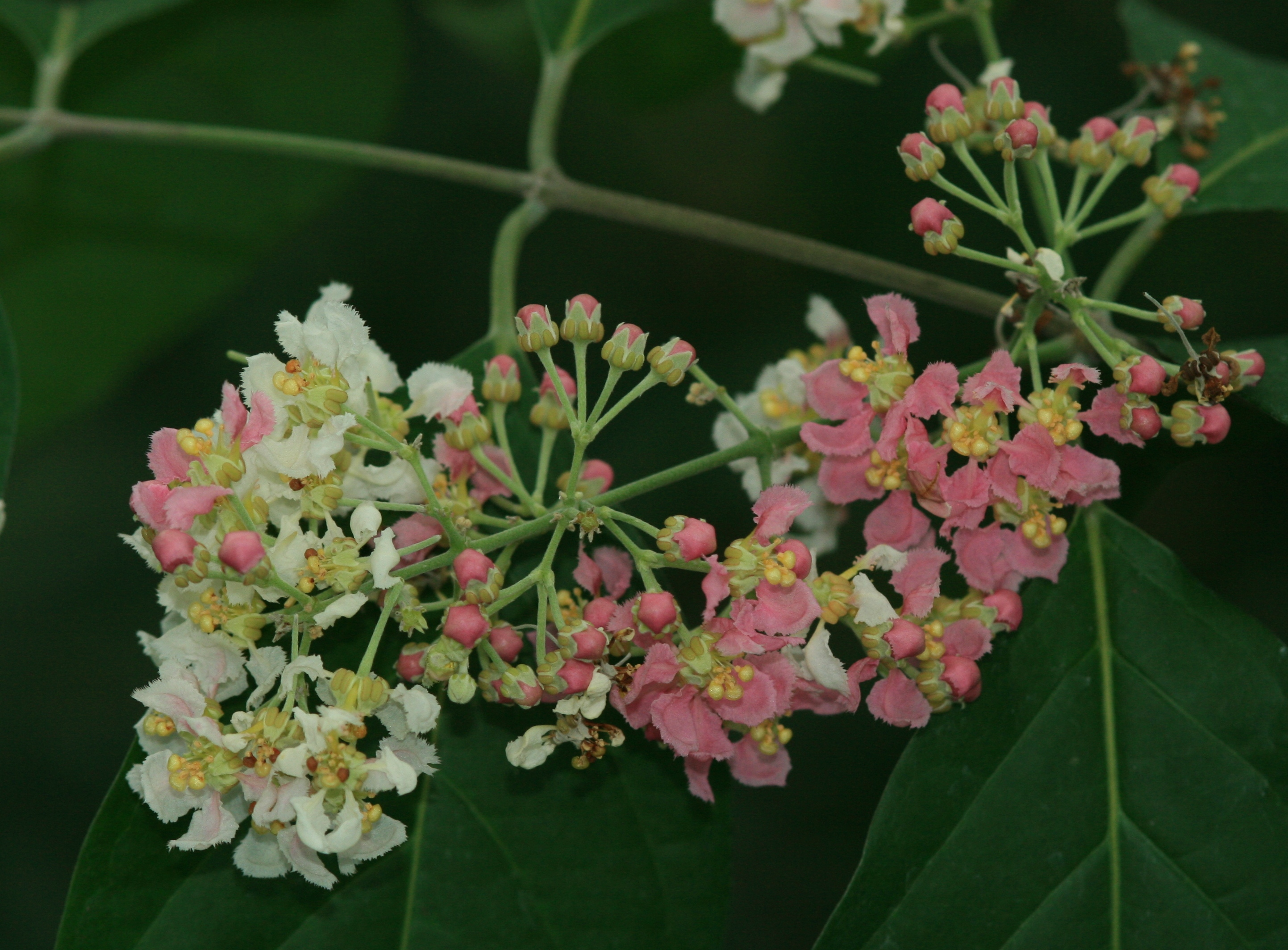
Caapi flowering

The vine can grow up to 30 m (98 ft) in length, twining on other plants for support.

== Phytochemicals ==
=== Alkaloids ===
Caapi contains these harmala alkaloids:

- Harmine, 0.31–8.43%
- Harmaline, 0.03–0.83%
- Tetrahydroharmine, 0.05–2.94%

These alkaloids of the beta-carboline class act as monoamine oxidase inhibitors. The MAOIs allow the primary psychoactive compound, DMT, which is introduced from the other common ingredient in ayahuasca Psychotria viridis, to be orally active. The constituents that may be responsible for the hallucinogenic activity of B. caapi include harmaline, tetrahydroharmine, and to a lesser extent, harmine. The stems contain 0.11–0.83% beta-carbolines, with harmine and tetrahydroharmine as the major components. Alkaloids are present in all parts of the plant.

=== Polyphenols ===
In addition to beta-carbolines, caapi is known to contain proanthocyanidins, epicatechin, and procyanidin B2.

== History ==
The first mentions of caapi come from early Spanish and Portuguese explorers and missionaries who visited South America in the 16th century, describing ayahuasca brews as "diabolic" and dangerous decoctions.

Although used among the indigenous tribes of South America for hundreds and perhaps even thousands of years, caapi was not identified by westerners until 1851, when Richard Spruce, an English botanist, described it as a new species. He observed how Guahibos, the indigenous people of Llanos (Venezuela), chewed the bark of caapi instead of brewing it as a drink.

== Legality ==
=== United States ===
In the United States, caapi is not specifically regulated. A 2006 Supreme Court decision involving caapi-containing ayahuasca, which also contains other plants containing the controlled substance DMT, introduced from the Psychotria viridis component, Gonzales v. O Centro Espirita Beneficente Uniao do Vegetal, was found in favor of the União do Vegetal, a Brazilian religious sect using the tea in their ceremonies and having around 130 members in the United States.

=== Australia ===
In Australia, the harmala alkaloids are scheduled substances, including harmine and harmaline; however, the living vine, or other source plants are not scheduled in most states. In the State of Queensland as of March 2008, this distinction is now uncertain. In all states, the dried herb may or may not be considered a scheduled substance, dependent on court rulings.

=== Canada ===
In Canada, harmala is listed under the Controlled Drugs and Substances Act as a schedule III substance. The vine and the ayahuasca brew are legal ambiguities, since nowhere in the Controlled Drugs and Substances Act is it stated that natural material containing a scheduled substance is illegal, a position supported by the United Nations International Narcotics Control Board.

=== France ===
Caapi, as well as a range of harmala alkaloids, is scheduled in France following a court victory by the Santo Daime religious sect allowing use of the tea due to it not being a chemical extraction and the fact that the plants used were not scheduled. Religious exceptions to narcotics laws are not allowed under French law, effectively making any use or possession of the tea illegal.

== Patent ==
The caapi vine itself was the subject of a dispute between U.S. entrepreneur Loren Miller and the Coordinating Body of Indigenous Organizations of the Amazon Basin (COICA). In 1986, Miller obtained a U.S. patent on a variety of B. caapi. COICA argued the patent was invalid because Miller's variety had been previously described in the University of Michigan Herbarium and was therefore neither new nor distinct. The patent was overturned in 1999; however, in 2001, the United States Patent Office reinstated the patent because the law at the time the patent was granted did not allow a third party such as COICA standing to object. The Miller patent expired in 2003. B. caapi is now being cultivated commercially in Hawaii.

== See also ==
- Entheogen
- List of psychoactive plants
- Ethnobotany
