= 6-Hydroxytryptamine =

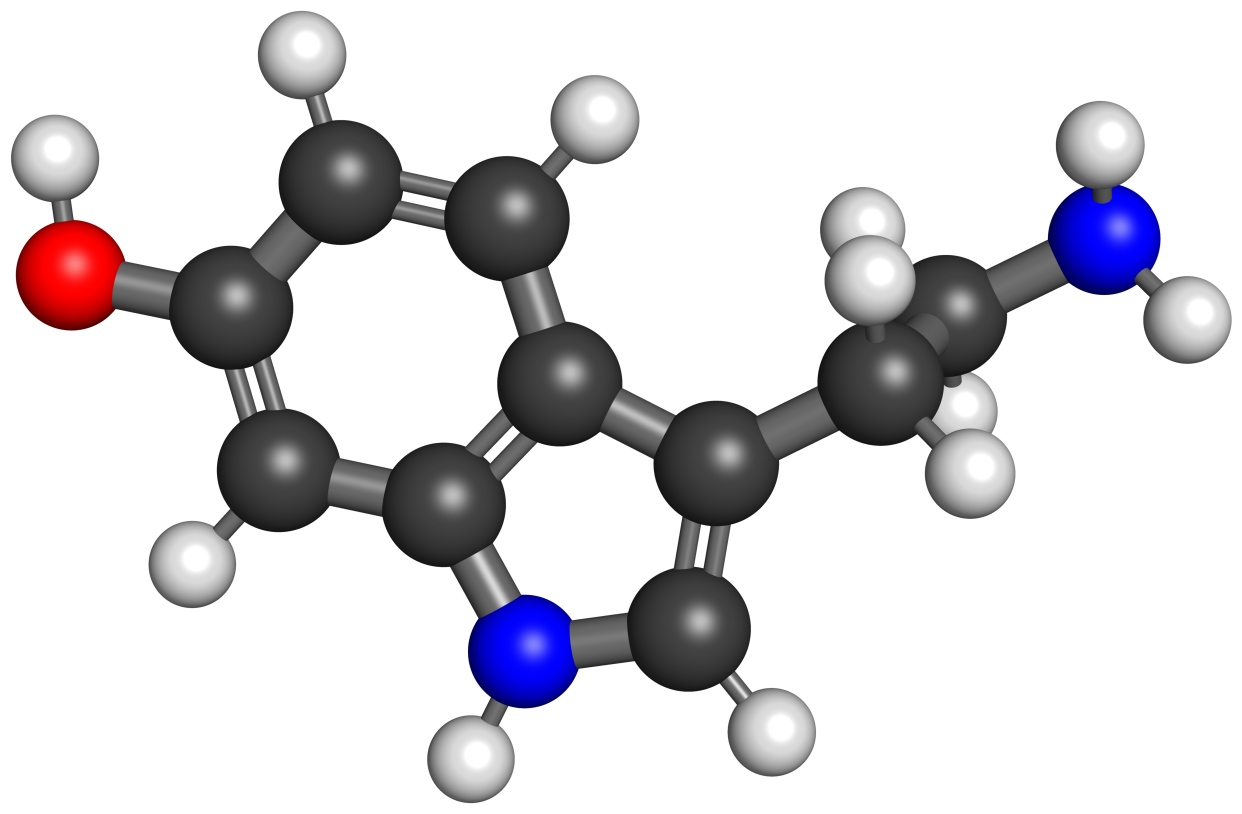

Clinical data
- Other names: 6-Hydroxy-T; 6-HT; 6-HO-T; 6-OH-T
- Drug class: Serotonin receptor modulator
- ATC code: None

Identifiers
- IUPAC name: 3-(2-aminoethyl)-1H-indol-6-ol
- CAS Number: 443-31-2
- PubChem CID: 160463
- ChemSpider: 141007
- ChEMBL: ChEMBL19264
- CompTox Dashboard (EPA): DTXSID10196105

Chemical and physical data
- Formula: C_{10}H_{12}N_{2}O
- Molar mass: 176.219 g·mol^{−1}
- 3D model (JSmol): Interactive image
- SMILES: C1=CC2=C(C=C1O)NC=C2CCN
- InChI: InChI=1S/C10H12N2O/c11-4-3-7-6-12-10-5-8(13)1-2-9(7)10/h1-2,5-6,12-13H,3-4,11H2; Key:WZTKTNRVJAMKAS-UHFFFAOYSA-N

6-Hydroxytryptamine (6-HT or 6-HO-T) is a serotonin receptor modulator of the tryptamine family related to serotonin. It is a positional isomer of serotonin (5-hydroxytryptamine; 5-HT) and of 4-hydroxytryptamine (4-HT).

== Pharmacology ==
6-Hydroxytryptamine shows dramatically reduced affinity for serotonin receptors, including the serotonin 5-HT_{1A}, 5-HT_{1B}, 5-HT_{2A}, and 5-HT_{2C} receptors (K_{i} = 1,590 nM, 5,890 nM, 11,500 nM, and 5,500 nM, respectively), compared to serotonin, 4-hydroxytryptamine, 5-methoxytryptamine, and certain other tryptamines. It did not produce hyperlocomotion in rodents but did partially reverse reserpine-induced hypoactivity. 6-Hydroxytryptamine appears to be less susceptible to metabolism by monoamine oxidase (MAO) than serotonin.

== History ==
6-Hydroxytryptamine was first described in the scientific literature by the 1950s.

== Derivatives ==
Certain β-carbolines and harmala alkaloids, such as harmol, harmalol, and tetrahydroharmol, as well as their O-methyl (methoxy) analogues including harmine, harmaline, and tetrahydroharmine, are notable in being naturally occurring cyclized tryptamine derivatives of 6-hydroxytryptamine. The same is true of certain iboga alkaloids, such as tabernanthine and ibogaline. Tabernanthalog (DLX-007) is a synthetic simplified ibogalog analogue of tabernanthine that is under development for use as a potential pharmaceutical drug in the treatment of neuropsychiatric disorders.

== See also ==
- Substituted tryptamine
- 4-Hydroxytryptamine
- 7-Hydroxytryptamine
- 6-Methoxytryptamine
- 6-Methyltryptamine
- 6-Hydroxy-DMT
- 6-MeO-DMT
- 5-MeO-isoDMT
- Zalsupindole (DLX-001, AAZ-A-154)
