= 1-Ethyl-β-carboline =

Clinical data
- Other names: 1-Ethyl-BC; 1-Ethyl-βC; 1-Et-BC; 1-Et-βC; 1-Ethylnorharman; 1-Ethyl-norharmane; 1-Ethyl-9H-β-carboline
- Drug class: Monoamine oxidase inhibitor (MAOI); Reversible inhibitor of MAO-A (RIMA); Dopamine reuptake inhibitor; Dopamine releasing agent
- ATC code: None

Identifiers
- IUPAC name: 1-ethyl-9H-pyrido[3,4-b]indole
- CAS Number: 20127-61-1
- PubChem CID: 5324325
- ChemSpider: 4481858
- UNII: K98LP3Z6TC
- ChEBI: CHEBI:182548
- ChEMBL: ChEMBL441986

Chemical and physical data
- Formula: C_{13}H_{12}N_{2}
- Molar mass: 196.253 g·mol^{−1}
- 3D model (JSmol): Interactive image
- SMILES: CCC1=NC=CC2=C1NC3=CC=CC=C23
- InChI: InChI=1S/C13H12N2/c1-2-11-13-10(7-8-14-11)9-5-3-4-6-12(9)15-13/h3-8,15H,2H2,1H3; Key:YTQRHYCHEIXUIU-UHFFFAOYSA-N

1-Ethyl-β-carboline is an alkaloid of the β-carboline family found in tobacco smoke. It is the 1-ethyl derivative of β-carboline (norharmane).

The drug is an antagonist of serotonin, histamine, acetylcholine, and barium chloride in guinea pig ileum tissue. In addition, it is an antagonist of the effects of catecholamines. 1-Ethyl-β-carboline produces central depression or hypolocomotion and hypotension in rodents. It is a weak reversible inhibitor of monoamine oxidase A (RIMA) (IC_{50} = 1,690 nM), with similar potency as β-carboline but 28- to 85-fold lower potency than harmaline and harmane (1-methyl-β-carboline). In addition, the drug is a lower-potency dopamine reuptake inhibitor (DRI), with an IC_{50} at the dopamine transporter (DAT) of 660 nM. It has also been found to induce dopamine release in rat striatal synaptosomes. It has been hypothesized that 1-ethyl-β-carboline might contribute to the rewarding effects of tobacco smoking.

The chemical synthesis of 1-ethyl-β-carboline has been described.

1-Ethyl-β-carboline was first described in the scientific literature by 1968.

== See also ==
- Substituted β-carboline
- 1-Ethyl-6-hydroxytryptoline
