= C13H16N2O =

The molecular formula C_{13}H_{16}N_{2}O (molar mass : 216.27 g/mol) may refer to:

- AZD0328
- Cirazoline
- Dianicline
- Efaroxan
- 1-Ethyl-6-hydroxytryptoline
- 4-HO-NALT
- 6-MeO-THH
- Oxantel
- Pharm-136
- Proxyfan
- Tetrahydroharmine
- Noribogainalog
