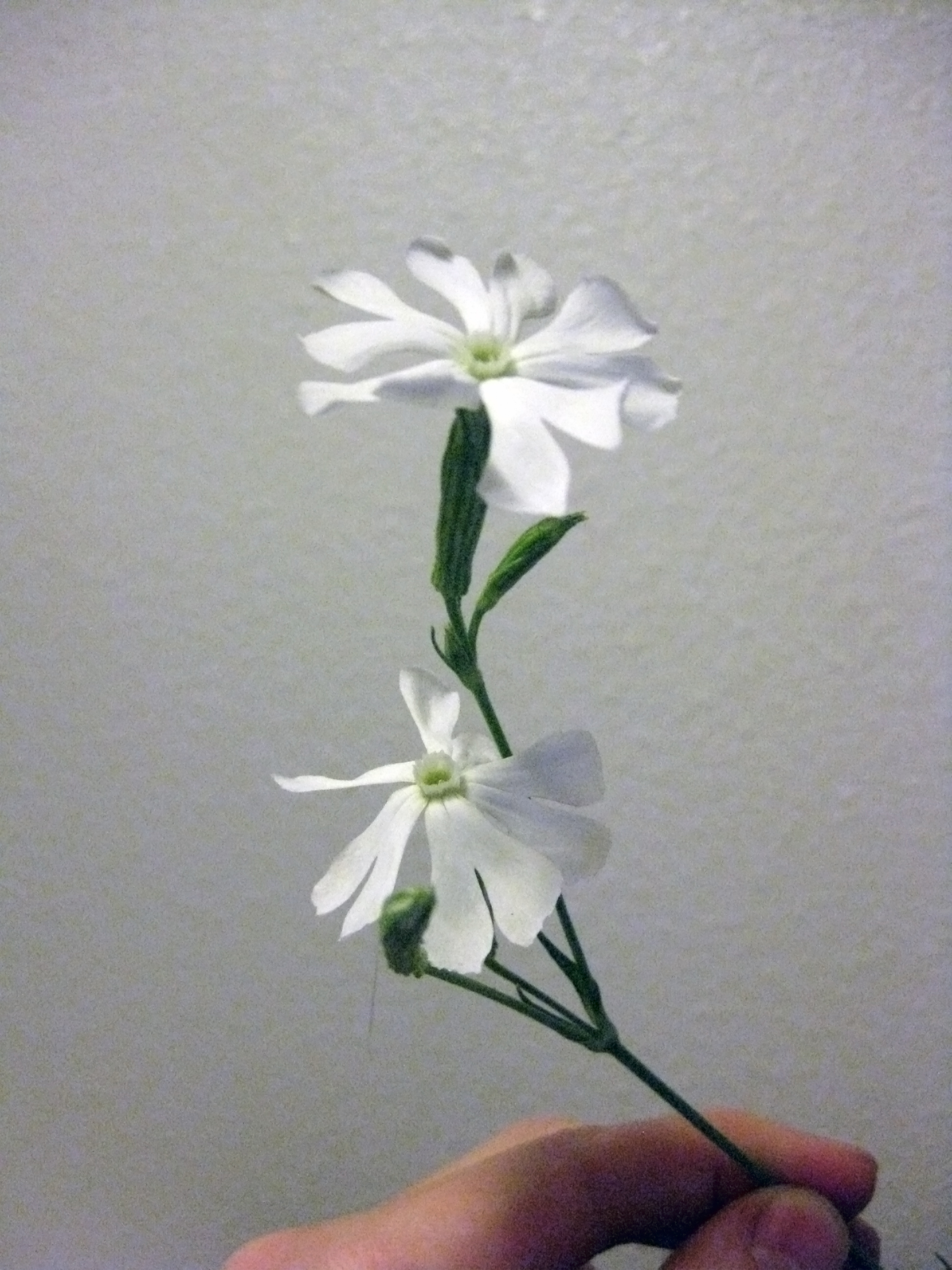

Scientific classification
- Kingdom: Plantae
- Clade: Tracheophytes
- Clade: Angiosperms
- Clade: Eudicots
- Order: Caryophyllales
- Family: Caryophyllaceae
- Genus: Silene
- Species: S. undulata

Binomial name
- Silene undulata Aiton

Synonyms
- Silene capensis Otth; Melandrium undulatum (Ait.) Rohrb.

= Silene undulata =

Species of plant

Silene undulata (Xhosa: iindlela zimhlophe—"white ways/paths", also known as Silene capensis, and African dream root) is a plant native to the Eastern Cape of South Africa.

== Cultivation ==
In cultivation, S. undulata is an easily grown, but moisture hungry herb. It is tolerant of extreme heat, >40 °C (104 °F), and moderate cold, −5 °C (23 °F). A moisture retentive seedbed is essential. The fragrant flowers open at night and close in the day. It is a biennial to short lived perennial and the root can be harvested after the second year.

== Uses ==
Silene undulata is regarded by the Xhosa people as a sacred plant. Its root is traditionally used to induce vivid (and according to the Xhosa, prophetic) lucid dreams during the initiation process of traditional healers, classifying it a naturally occurring oneirogen similar to the more well-known dream herb Calea zacatechichi.

== Constituents ==
Silene undulata has been found to contain β-carbolines such as norharman, harmalol, and harmaline, and harmine, as well as ibogaine. In addition, these constituents were predicted to act as serotonin 5-HT_{2A} receptor agonists. These components, and in turn serotonin 5-HT_{2A} receptor activation, may be involved in the psychoactive effects of Silene undulata.

== See also ==
- Oneirogen
