= C13H14N2O =

The molecular formula C_{13}H_{14}N_{2}O (molar mass: 214.26 g/mol, exact mass: 214.1106 u) may refer to:

- 9-Oxaergoline
- Velnacrine, or 1-hydroxytacrine
- Fenyramidol, or phenyramidol
- Fadolmidine
- Methoxyharmalan
  - 5-Methoxyharmalan
  - 6-Methoxyharmalan
  - Harmaline (7-Methoxyharmalan)
