= C12H10N2O =

The molecular formula C_{12}H_{10}N_{2}O (molar mass: 198.22 g/mol) may refer to:

- Azoxybenzene
- Harmol
- N-Nitrosodiphenylamine
- Norharmine
- Solvent Yellow 7
