= 6-Methoxyharman =

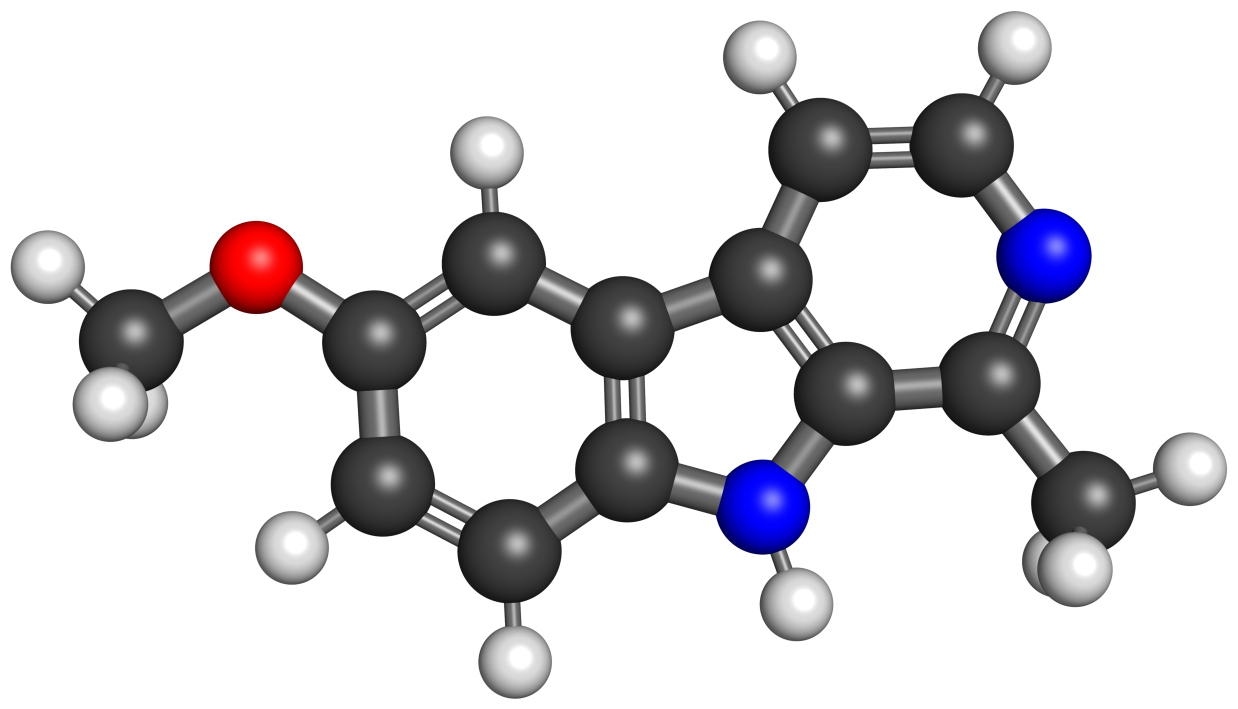

Clinical data
- Other names: Coharmine; Isoharmine; 6-Methoxyharmane; 6-MeO-harman; 6-OMe-harman; 6-Methoxy-1-methyl-β-carboline; 1-Methyl-6-methoxy-2-carboline
- ATC code: None

Identifiers
- IUPAC name: 6-methoxy-1-methyl-9H-pyrido[3,4-b]indole
- CAS Number: 3589-72-8
- PubChem CID: 5376026
- ChemSpider: 4525389
- UNII: 48GQI7H930
- ChEMBL: ChEMBL278193
- CompTox Dashboard (EPA): DTXSID40189449

Chemical and physical data
- Formula: C_{13}H_{12}N_{2}O
- Molar mass: 212.252 g·mol^{−1}
- 3D model (JSmol): Interactive image
- SMILES: CC1=NC=CC2=C1NC3=C2C=C(C=C3)OC
- InChI: InChI=1S/C13H12N2O/c1-8-13-10(5-6-14-8)11-7-9(16-2)3-4-12(11)15-13/h3-7,15H,1-2H3; Key:XYYVPBBISSKKQB-UHFFFAOYSA-N

6-Methoxyharman, also known as isoharmine, is a β-carboline and harmala alkaloid. It is an analogue of other β-carbolines like harman and 6-methoxyharmalan. The compound has been found to be naturally occurring in Peganum harmala and Virola species such as Virola cuspidata and Virola elongata. It is a potent monoamine oxidase inhibitor (MAOI). In addition, 6-methoxyharman has been found to bind to serotonin receptors, including the serotonin 5-HT_{2C} receptor (K_{i} = 3,700 nM), but notably not to the serotonin 5-HT_{2A} or 5-HT_{1A} receptors (K_{i} = >10,000). It may potentiate the effects of psychedelic tryptamines like dimethyltryptamine (DMT) via its MAOI activity, for instance when they are used as Virola-containing hallucinogenic snuffs. According to Alexander Shulgin, Claudio Naranjo might have tested the effects 6-methoxyharman in humans, but this is unclear.

== See also ==
- Substituted β-carboline
- Harmala alkaloid
