= C12H10N2 =

The molecular formula C_{12}H_{10}N_{2} (molar mass: 182.22 g/mol) may refer to:

- Azobenzene, a chemical compound composed of two phenyl rings linked by a N=N double bond
- Harmane, a heterocyclic amine found in a variety of foods
- 9-Me-BC, a heterocyclic amine of the beta-carboline family
