= Oneirogen =

Drug that produces a dream-like state of consciousness

- Drug class
- Chemical structure of ibogaine, the main active constituent of Tabernanthe iboga and among the most well-known oneirogens.

Class identifiers
- Synonyms: Oneirophrenic; Oneiric; Ibogaine-type hallucinogen; Harmaline-type hallucinogen
- Use: Recreational, spiritual, medical
- Mechanism of action: Unknown
- Biological target: Unknown
- Chemical class: Azepinoindoles (e.g., ibogaine), β-carbolines (e.g., harmaline)

Legal status
- Legal status: Variable

An oneirogen (from the Greek ὄνειρος óneiros meaning "dream" and gen "to create") is a drug that induces a dream-like state of consciousness, also known as oneirophrenia.

== Etymology ==
The term oneirogen, oneirophrenic, or oneiric, was introduced to refer specifically to ibogaine- and harmaline-type hallucinogens by William Turner and Claudio Naranjo in the 1960s and 1970s. Subsequently, the term has also sometimes been used to refer to non-hallucinogenic drugs that facilitate dreaming.

== Hallucinogenic oneirogens ==
Hallucinogenic oneirogens include the following:

- Iboga alkaloids such as ibogaine and noribogaine (found in Tabernanthe iboga (iboga) and Silene undulata (African dream root))
- β-Carbolines and harmala alkaloids such as harmine, harmaline, tetrahydroharmine (THH), 6-methoxyharmalan, and 6-MeO-THH (some of the preceding found in Peganum harmala (Syrian rue) and Banisteriopsis caapi (caapi, yage; part of ayahuasca))

These compounds are notable in being structurally similar cyclized tryptamines and in being structurally related to psychedelic tryptamines. For example, ibogaine is a cyclized derivative of 5-MeO-DMT, while harmaline is a cyclized derivative of 6-MeO-DMT.

The hallucinogenic effects of these drugs are qualitatively unique and have been described as a "dream-like" altered state of consciousness. Iboga alkaloids and β-carbolines or harmala alkaloids have similar qualitative effects, but despite their structural relation to tryptamine psychedelics, show distinct and dissimilar subjective effects from those of serotonergic psychedelics like LSD, psilocybin, and mescaline.

Ibogaine and noribogaine are so-called "dirty drugs" that are known to interact with numerous targets. However, the precise mechanism of action of oneirogens like ibogaine, or whether their hallucinogenic effects are due to multiple concomitant activities, are unknown. While they can bind to the serotonin 5-HT_{2A} receptor similarly to serotonergic psychedelics, neither iboga alkaloids nor β-carbolines actually activate the receptor, unlike psychedelics. In addition, ibogaine does not produce the head-twitch response, a behavioral proxy of serotonergic psychedelic effects, in rodents. Noribogaine, the major active metabolite and form of ibogaine, is known to be a potent atypical κ-opioid receptor agonist. However, harmala alkaloids like harmaline do not interact with the κ-opioid receptor. Similarly, the NMDA receptor and the sigma σ_{1} receptor do not appear to be involved in the subjective effects of ibogaine based on animal studies.

Oral doses and durations of β-carbolines or harmala alkaloids
Compound	Chemical name	Dose (hallucinogen)	Potency	Dose (MAOI)	Duration
Harman	1-Methyl-β-carboline	>250 mg	Unknown	>250 mg	Unknown
Harmine	7-Methoxyharman	>300 mg	≤50%	140–250 mg	6–8 hours
Harmaline	7-Methoxy-3,4-dihydroharman	150–400 mg	100%	70–150 mg	5–8 hours
Tetrahydroharmine	7-Methoxy-1,2,3,4-tetrahydroharman	≥300 mg	~33%	Unknown	Unknown
6-Methoxyharmalan	6-Methoxy-3,4-dihydroharman	~100 mg	~150%	Unknown	Unknown
6-MeO-THH	6-Methoxy-1,2,3,4-tetrahydroharman	≥100 mg	~50%	Unknown	Unknown
P. harmala seeds	–	≥5–28 g^{a}	–	3–5 g^{a}	Unknown
Footnotes: ^{a} = P. harmala seeds in ground form. They contain 2–7% harmala alkaloids, with 1 teaspoon ≈ 3 g ≈ 60–180 mg alkaloids; 1 tablespoon ≈ 9 g ≈ 200–600 mg alkaloids; and 1 large (OO) gelatin capsule ≈ 0.7 g ≈ 15–45 mg alkaloids. For comparison, B. caapi contains 0.05–1.95% (average 0.45%) harmala alkaloids. Note: Harmine and other β-carbolines have also been tested by non-oral routes such as sublingual, subcutaneous injection, intramuscular injection, and intravenous injection. Refs: See template page.

== Dreaming-promoting oneirogens ==
=== Claimed ===
- Calea zacatechichi ("Calea ternifolia") has been traditionally used in Central America as a believed way to potentiate lucid dreams and perform dream divination. It can promote dreams vivid to the senses, sight, scent, hearing, touch, and taste. May be taken as a tea or smoked.
- Entada rheedei ("African dream bean")
- Mugwort, see Artemisia douglasiana and Artemisia vulgaris
- Silene undulata (also known as "Silene capensis" or "African dream root") is used by the Xhosa people of South Africa to induce lucid dreams. It has been found to contain harmala and iboga type alkaloids.

=== Possible ===
- Diphenhydramine ("Benadryl") can invoke an intense hypnagogic REM-like microsleep often indifferentiable from reality. It accomplishes this by blocking various acetylcholine receptors in the brain.
- Galantamine was shown to increase lucid dreaming by 27% at 4 mg and 42% at 8 mg in a 2018 double-blind study lasting three nights.
- Huperzia serrata containing huperzine A and B, a plant-derived alkaloids that act as a potent, reversible and selective inhibitors of inhibitors of acetylcholinesterase (AChEI) activity has been used for centuries in China and were shown to induce lucid dreaming.
- Melatonin receptor agonists like melatonin and ramelteon may cause vivid dreams as a side effect

=== Disputed ===
- Valerian (herb) – A study conducted in the UK in 2001 showed that valerian root significantly improved stress induced insomnia, but as a side effect greatly increased the vividness of dreams. This study concluded that valerian root affects REM due to natural chemicals and essential oils that stimulate serotonin and opioid receptors. Another study found no encephalographic changes in subjects under its influence.

=== Non-pharmacological ===
- Mindfulness practices could be useful in achieving lucid dream.
- Sleep deprivation can make dreams more intense, which is caused by REM rebound effect

== See also ==
- List of hallucinogens
- List of investigational hallucinogens and entactogens
- Oneiromancy
- Oneirophrenia
