= Tryptoline =

Clinical data
- Other names: Noreleagnine; Tetrahydronorharman; THN; 2,3,4,9-Tetrahydro-1H-β-carboline; 1,2,3,4-Tetrahydro-β-carboline; Tetrahydro-β-carboline; THβC; THBC
- ATC code: None

Identifiers
- IUPAC name: 2,3,4,9-tetrahydro-1H-pyrido[3,4-b]indole
- CAS Number: 16502-01-5
- PubChem CID: 107838
- ChemSpider: 96979
- UNII: 65027TMI0H
- ChEMBL: ChEMBL269236
- CompTox Dashboard (EPA): DTXSID10167835
- ECHA InfoCard: 100.156.194

Chemical and physical data
- Formula: C_{11}H_{12}N_{2}
- Molar mass: 172.231 g·mol^{−1}
- 3D model (JSmol): Interactive image
- SMILES: c1ccc2c(c1)c3c([nH]2)CNCC3
- InChI: InChI=1S/C11H12N2/c1-2-4-10-8(3-1)9-5-6-12-7-11(9)13-10/h1-4,12-13H,5-7H2; Key:CFTOTSJVQRFXOF-UHFFFAOYSA-N

Tryptoline, also known as 1,2,3,4-tetrahydro-β-carboline (THβC) and tetrahydronorharmane (THN), is a natural organic derivative of β-carboline. It is an alkaloid chemically related to tryptamines. Derivatives of tryptoline have a variety of pharmacological properties and are known collectively as tryptolines.

== Use and effects ==
The properties and effects of tryptoline in humans do not appear to be known.

== Pharmacology ==
=== Pharmacodynamics ===
Tryptolines are competitive selective inhibitors of the enzyme monoamine oxidase type A (MAO-A). 5-Hydroxytryptoline and 5-methoxytryptoline are the most active monoamine oxidase inhibitors (MAOIs) with IC_{50} values of 500 nM and 1,500 nM, respectively.

Tryptolines are also potent reuptake inhibitors of serotonin and epinephrine, with a significantly greater selectivity for serotonin.

Tryptoline shows weak affinity for the serotonin 5-HT_{1A}, 5-HT_{2A}, and 5-HT_{2C} receptors (K_{i} = 2,510–4,310 nM, 3,040–3,900 nM, and >10,000 nM, respectively). However, it showed a high affinity (K_{i}) of 28 nM against tryptamine-labeled binding sites, whereas affinity for serotonin- and spiperone-labeled sites were much lower (K_{i} = 6,030 nM and 12,030 nM, respectively). The drug shows substantially lower affinity for serotonin receptors than tryptamine. Tryptoline is 60-fold more potent in terms of tryptamine binding site interaction than its serotonin reuptake inhibition. The drug is inactive as an agonist of the serotonin 5-HT_{2B} receptor in the rat fundus stomach strip (K_{B} = >3,000 nM).

Tryptoline is known to produce various behavioral effects in animals, including analgesia, hypothermia, and hypophagia, as well as antidopaminergic-like reversal of behavioral effects of apomorphine such as hyperlocomotion.

Both tryptoline and pinoline partially substitute for the psychedelic drug LSD in rodent drug discrimination tests. The substitution by tryptoline was found to be blocked by the serotonin receptor antagonist pizotifen and by the serotonin synthesis inhibitor para-chlorophenylalanine (PCPA). In subsequent studies, tryptoline was used as the training drug, and fenfluramine and MDMA fully substituted for tryptoline while LSD and yohimbine partially substituted for tryptoline. Tryptoline likewise substituted for fenfluramine. In a later study, tryptoline failed to substitute for LSD, contradicting previous findings. The non-selective serotonin receptor agonists TFMPP and mCPP fully substituted for tryptoline, whereas serotonin 5-HT_{1A} receptor agonists did not. Neither of the serotonin receptor antagonists pirenperone or metergoline antagonized the tryptoline-mediated discriminative stimulus. It was theorized that the tryptoline cue was mediated by serotonin 5-HT_{1B} receptor activation.

In-vivo formation of tryptolines has been a matter of controversy.

== Chemistry ==
=== Derivatives ===
Tryptoline derivatives have been found to interact with serotonin receptors, such as the serotonin 5-HT_{1A} and 5-HT_{2} receptors. A couple of notable derivatives, 1-ethyl-6-hydroxytryptoline and 1-(2,4,5-trimethoxyphenyl)-6-chlorotryptoline, are potent and high-efficacy agonists of the serotonin 5-HT_{2} receptors, including of the serotonin 5-HT_{2A} receptor. Pinoline (6-methoxytryptoline) is another notable tryptoline derivative, acting as a weak serotonin 5-HT_{2A} receptor agonist and as a potent serotonin 5-HT_{2C} receptor agonist among other actions.

== See also ==
- Substituted β-carboline
- Norharmane
- Harmane
- β-Carboline
- Harmala alkaloid
