= 6-Methoxytryptamine =

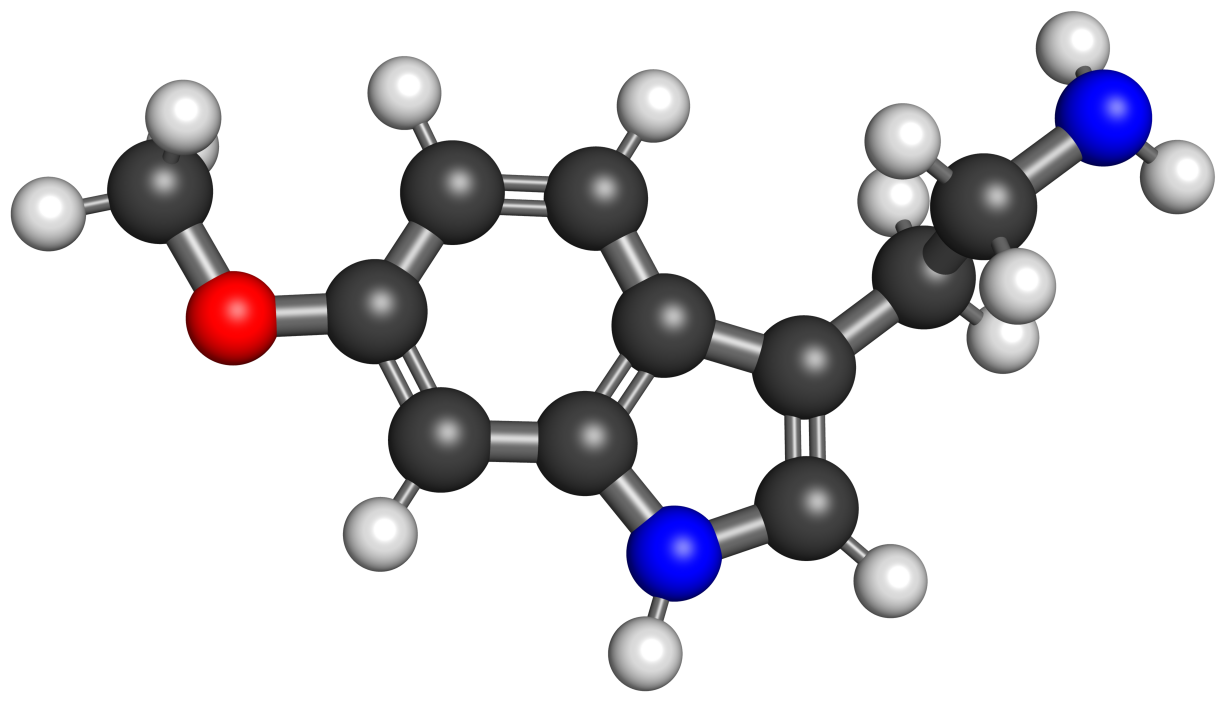

Clinical data
- Other names: 6-Methoxy-T; 6-MeO-T; PAL-263; PAL263
- Drug class: Monoamine releasing agent; Serotonin–norepinephrine–dopamine releasing agent; Serotonin receptor modulator
- ATC code: None

Identifiers
- IUPAC name: 2-(6-methoxy-1H-indol-3-yl)ethanamine
- CAS Number: 3610-36-4
- PubChem CID: 17654
- ChemSpider: 16687
- UNII: 83E56U9G2L
- ChEMBL: ChEMBL337825
- CompTox Dashboard (EPA): DTXSID80189680
- ECHA InfoCard: 100.020.708

Chemical and physical data
- Formula: C_{11}H_{14}N_{2}O
- Molar mass: 190.246 g·mol^{−1}
- 3D model (JSmol): Interactive image
- SMILES: COC1=CC2=C(C=C1)C(=CN2)CCN
- InChI: InChI=1S/C11H14N2O/c1-14-9-2-3-10-8(4-5-12)7-13-11(10)6-9/h2-3,6-7,13H,4-5,12H2,1H3; Key:VOCGEKMEZOPDFP-UHFFFAOYSA-N

6-Methoxytryptamine (6-MeO-T; developmental code name PAL-263) is a monoamine releasing agent and serotonin receptor modulator of the tryptamine family. It is a positional isomer of 5-methoxytryptamine.

== Pharmacology ==
6-Methoxytryptamine is a potent serotonin–norepinephrine–dopamine releasing agent (SNDRA), with EC_{50} values for monoamine release induction of 53.8 nM for serotonin, 113 nM for dopamine, and 465 nM for norepinephrine in rat brain synaptosomes. It is also a full agonist of the serotonin 5-HT_{2A} receptor, but with very low potency; its EC_{50} and E_{max} at this receptor were 2,443 nM and 111%, respectively. In a series of tryptamine derivatives, 6-methoxytryptamine was the least potent serotonin 5-HT_{2A} receptor agonist, while 5-methoxytryptamine was the most potent serotonin 5-HT_{2A} receptor agonist, with 5-methoxytryptamine showing approximately 4,857-fold higher potency in terms of serotonin 5-HT_{2A} receptor agonism than 6-methoxytryptamine. Conversely, whereas 6-methoxytryptamine was a potent monoamine releasing agent, 5-methoxytryptamine showed very low potency in this regard.

== History ==
6-Methoxytryptamine was first described in the scientific literature by the 1950s.

== Derivatives ==
Certain β-carbolines and harmala alkaloids, such as harmine, harmaline, and tetrahydroharmine, are notable in being naturally occurring cyclized tryptamine derivatives of 6-methoxytryptamine. The same is true of certain iboga alkaloids, such as tabernanthine and ibogaline. Tabernanthalog (DLX-007) is a synthetic simplified ibogalog analogue of tabernanthine that is under development for use as a potential pharmaceutical drug in the treatment of neuropsychiatric disorders.

== See also ==
- Substituted tryptamine
- 6-Hydroxytryptamine
- 6-Methyltryptamine
- 4-Methoxytryptamine
- 5-Methoxytryptamine
- 6-MeO-DMT
- 5-MeO-isoDMT
- Zalsupindole (DLX-001, AAZ-A-154)
