= Oxopropaline =

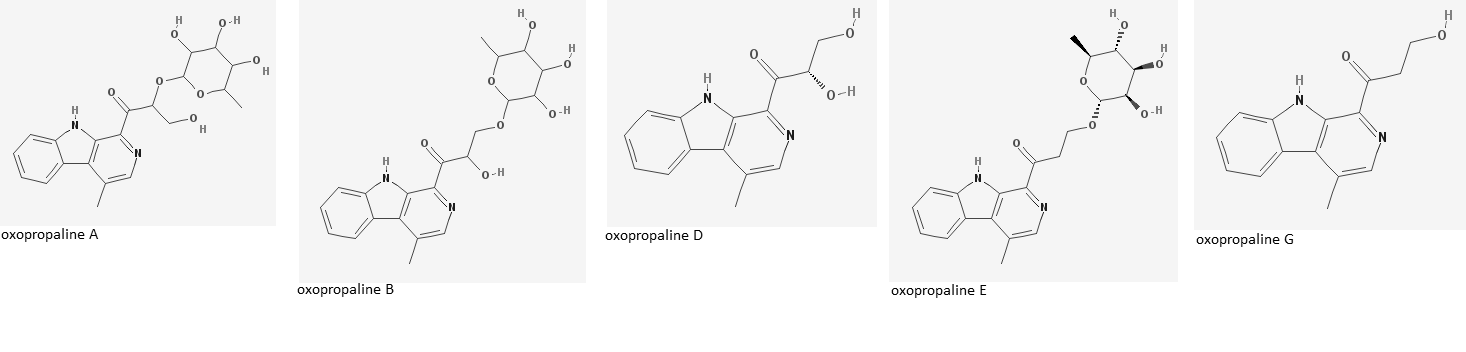
Oxopropalines

Oxopropalines are novel cytocidal β-carbolines isolated from Streptomyces.
