= Pinoline =

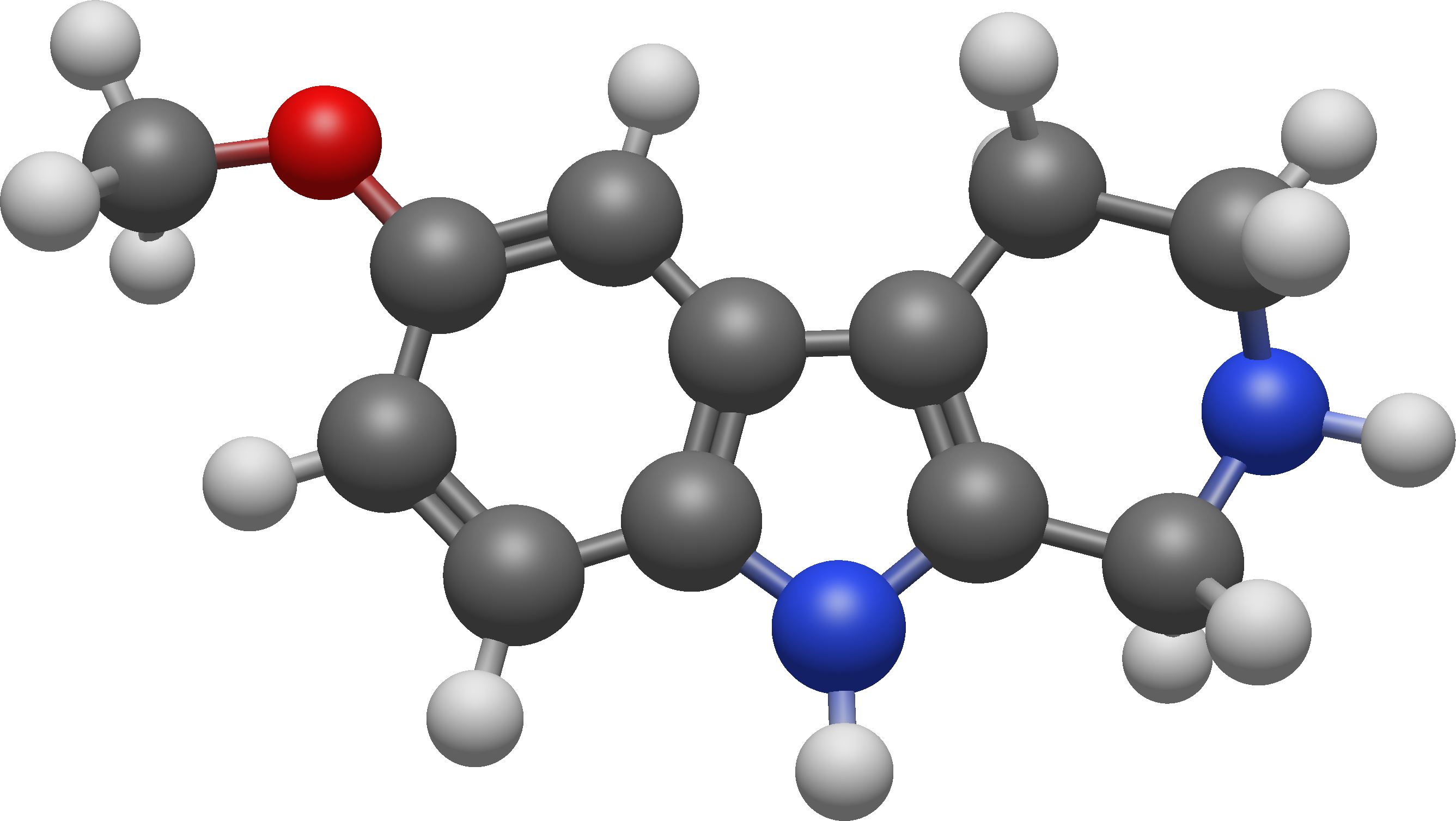

Clinical data
- Other names: 6-Methoxy-THBC; 6-Methoxy-THβC; 6-MeO-THBC; 6-MeO-THβC; 5-MeO-TLN; 6-Methoxytryptoline; 6-Methoxy-2,3,4,9-tetrahydro-1H-β-carboline; 6-Methoxy-1,2,3,4-tetrahydro-β-carboline; 6-Methoxy-tetrahydronorharman; 6-Methoxy-2,3,4,9-tetrahydro-1H-β-carboline; Pineal β-carboline
- Drug class: Serotonin receptor modulator; Serotonin 5-HT_{2A} receptor agonist; Serotonin 5-HT_{2C} receptor agonist; Serotonin 5-HT_{2B} receptor antagonist; Serotonin reuptake inhibitor
- ATC code: None

Identifiers
- IUPAC name: 6-methoxy-2,3,4,9-tetrahydro-1H-pyrido[3,4-b]indole
- CAS Number: 20315-68-8
- PubChem CID: 1868
- ChemSpider: 1797
- UNII: BR3W85U4GS
- ChEMBL: ChEMBL266084
- CompTox Dashboard (EPA): DTXSID30174203
- ECHA InfoCard: 100.161.873

Chemical and physical data
- Formula: C_{12}H_{14}N_{2}O
- Molar mass: 202.257 g·mol^{−1}
- 3D model (JSmol): Interactive image
- Melting point: 216 to 224 °C (421 to 435 °F)
- SMILES: COC1=CC2=C(C=C1)NC3=C2CCNC3
- InChI: InChI=1S/C12H14N2O/c1-15-8-2-3-11-10(6-8)9-4-5-13-7-12(9)14-11/h2-3,6,13-14H,4-5,7H2,1H3; Key:QYMDEOQLJUUNOF-UHFFFAOYSA-N

Pinoline, also known as 6-methoxytryptoline or as 6-methoxy-1,2,3,4-tetrahydro-β-carboline (6-MeO-THβC), is a β-carboline long-claimed to be produced in the pineal gland during the metabolism of melatonin, however its pineal occurrence remains controversial. Its more common name is a contraction of "pineal β-carboline". The biological activity of this molecule is of interest as a potential free radical scavenger, also known as an antioxidant, and as a monoamine oxidase A inhibitor.

== Use and effects ==
It remains unknown whether pinoline has hallucinogenic effects in humans.

== Pharmacology ==
=== Pharmacodynamics ===
Pinoline shows affinity for serotonin receptors, including the serotonin 5-HT_{1A}, 5-HT_{2A}, 5-HT_{2B}, 5-HT_{2C}, and 5-HT_{7} receptors (K_{i} = 156–4,335 nM). It is a high-efficacy partial agonist of the serotonin 5-HT_{2A} receptor, an antagonist of the serotonin 5-HT_{2B} receptor, and a full agonist of the serotonin 5-HT_{2C} receptor, with EC_{50} (E_{max}) values of 2,140 nM (75%) at the serotonin 5-HT_{2A} receptor and 33 nM (95%) at the serotonin 5-HT_{2C} receptor and an IC_{50} of 1,120 nM at the serotonin 5-HT_{2B} receptor. Hence, pinoline appears to act as a potent and selective serotonin 5-HT_{2C} receptor agonist.

The drug shows affinity for the serotonin transporter (SERT) (K_{i} = 172–572 nM). It is a serotonin reuptake inhibitor, with an IC_{50} value of 1,100 nM. Pinoline shows affinity for the imidazoline I_{2} receptor (K_{i} = 1,640 nM) and for the α_{2}-adrenergic receptor (K_{i} = 7,830 nM). Conversely, it shows no affinity for the dopamine D_{2} receptor (K_{i} = >10,000 nM). The drug is a weak monoamine oxidase inhibitor (MAOI), with an IC_{50} value for inhibition of MAO-A of 41,500 nM.

Both pinoline and tryptoline partially substitute for the psychedelic drug LSD in rodent drug discrimination tests. The substitution by tryptoline was further assessed and was found to be blocked by the serotonin receptor antagonist pizotifen and by the serotonin synthesis inhibitor para-chlorophenylalanine (PCPA). Pinoline has also been reported to produce anxiogenic-like effects in rodents, which theoretically might be mediated by agonism of serotonin 5-HT_{2C} receptors. In addition, it has been reported to produce antidepressant-like effects in rodents.

==== Other actions ====
One of pinoline's pharmacological properties is its ability to promote neurogenesis in vitro; even at trace concentrations.

Aluminium toxicity causes an increase in lipid peroxidation, with most damage occurring in the brain. A recent review of studies shows pinoline and melatonin to be effective at reducing the lipid peroxidation. Studies included both human and animal subjects. The studies’ results support that pinoline has antioxidant properties.

Lipopolysaccharide is produced by Gram-negative bacteria and stimulates the production of free radicals which in turn cause lipid peroxidation. A recent study compared the effectiveness of melatonin and other similar compounds on the lipopolysaccharide induced lipid peroxidation. The results showed support for pinoline’s ability to reduce damage from lipid peroxidation. Pinoline was also shown to be more effective than vitamin E at reducing lipopolysaccharide activity in the retina.

A 2010 study compared the antioxidant properties of compounds from the tryptophan metabolic pathway in the pineal gland against oxidative damage to the lipids and proteins of synaptosomes. Synaptosomes isolated from rat brains were used in an experiment assessing damage by measuring malondialdehyde, 4-hydroxyalkenal, and carbonyl content in the proteins. Pinoline was shown to be the most powerful antioxidant. These results support the evidence for pinoline’s antioxidant abilities and the potential to protect against oxidative damage.

=== Pharmacokinetics ===
Pinoline is a substrate for CYP2D6.

== Chemistry ==
=== Synthesis ===
The chemical synthesis of pinoline has been described.

=== Analogues ===
Analogues of pinoline include tryptoline, 6-MeO-THH, shepherdine, 1-ethyl-6-hydroxytryptoline, tetrahydroharmine (THH or 7-MeO-THH), and tetrahydroharmol, among others.

== History ==
Pinoline was first described in the scientific literature by at least 1969.

== Research ==
Bausch & Lomb filed a patent for a drug delivery device utilizing this molecule, designed to treat various ophthalmic disorders in 2006.

== See also ==
- Substituted β-carboline
- List of miscellaneous serotonin 5-HT_{2A} receptor agonists
