= Shepherdine =

Names
- IUPAC names 1-methyl-2,3,4,9-tetrahydro-1H-pyrido[3,4-b]indol-6-ol
- Other names 1-Methyl-6-hydroxy-1,2,3,4-tetrahydrobetacarboline; 1-Methyl-6-hydroxytryptoline; 1-Methyl-6-hydroxytetrahydrocarboline; 5-Hydroxymethyltryptoline; 5-Hydroxymettryptoline; 6-Hydroxy-1-methyltryptoline; 6-OH-Mthbc; 6-Hydroxytetrahydroharman; 6-Hydroxy-1,2,3,4-tetrahydroharmane; 6-Tetrahydroharmol

Identifiers
CAS Number	3000-36-0
3D model (JSmol)	Interactive image
ChemSpider	88718
PubChem CID	98248
- InChI: InChI=1S/C12H14N2O/c1-7-12-9(4-5-13-7)10-6-8(15)2-3-11(10)14-12/h2-3,6-7,13-15H,4-5H2,1H3 Key: GHKJDZJAHHVUTD-UHFFFAOYSA-N
- SMILES: CC1C2=C(CCN1)C3=C(N2)C=CC(=C3)O

Properties
Chemical formula	C_{12}H_{14}N_{2}O
Molar mass	202.257 g·mol^{−1}
- Except where otherwise noted, data are given for materials in their standard state (at 25 °C [77 °F], 100 kPa). Infobox references

Shepherdine, also known as 6-hydroxy-1-tetrahydrocarboline (or 6-Hydroxy-1-methyltryptoline; 6-OH-MTHBC) it is an alkaloid found naturally in mammals and in small amounts in some fruits and fruit juices; it has been reported to be present in bananas, pineapples, and tomatoes. It is said that shepherdine—specifically its oxidized metabolites, which are similar to certain salsolinols—increases in the brains of mammals following alcohol consumption, as a consequence of chronic alcoholism.

Shepherdine is known by many names in the literature; it has been referred to as 5-hydroxymettryptoline, 6-hydroxymettryptoline, or 7-hydroxy-1-methyltetrahydro-beta-carboline, although, despite the confusion, all these names describe the same compound

== Formation ==
Shepherdine is formed as a result of the oxidation of alcohol, which produces acetaldehyde and free radicals in the cytoplasm of serotonergic axon terminals; these conditions facilitate the endogenous synthesis of shepherdine through the reaction of acetaldehyde with 5-hydroxytryptamine, as well as for the oxygen-radical-mediated oxidation of this alkaloid. The main product of shepherdine oxidation by the hydroxyl radical in the presence of reduced glutathione is 8-S-glutathionyl-1-methyl-1,2,3,4-tetrahydro-beta-carboline-5,6-dione, which exhibits neurotoxic properties; specifically, it is a monoaminergic neurotoxin with toxicity approximately equal to that of 6-hydroxydopamine when administered to the brain (the LD_{50} value for the oxidized metabolite of shepherdine is 2.9 μg), it causes episodes of hyperactivity and tremors; it binds to the GABAB receptor and induces increased release and turnover of several neurotransmitters; it is hypothesized that it may act as a reverse agonist of the GABAB receptor. The metabolite promotes increased release of several specific neurotransmitters, including dopamine and endogenous opioids, in brain regions innervated by serotonergic terminals.

== Natural occurrence ==
=== In mammals ===
There are several studies that have determined the levels of shepherdine in tissues and biological fluids; for example, a 1983 study on rats detected it in urine and feces, and the compound was found in the liver, kidneys, and plasma; however, that study reported the absence of the compound in the brain; a 2009 study, also conducted on rats, determined its concentration in the brains of newborn rats, noting that shepherdine levels increased when the rats were exposed to alcohol. Research conducted in the 1980s also described the natural presence of shepherdine in animals; it was detected as a component of human and feline urine. It was concluded that shepherdine is naturally present in mammalian urine and is most likely a metabolite of 1-methyltryptoline.

=== In plants ===
Shepherdine has been found in bananas, pineapples, and tomatoes, as well as in their juices. It was first described as an alkaloid specifically from the plant Shepherdia canadensis

== See also ==
- Substituted β-carboline
- Pinoline
- 1-Ethyl-6-hydroxytryptoline
