= Eudistomin =

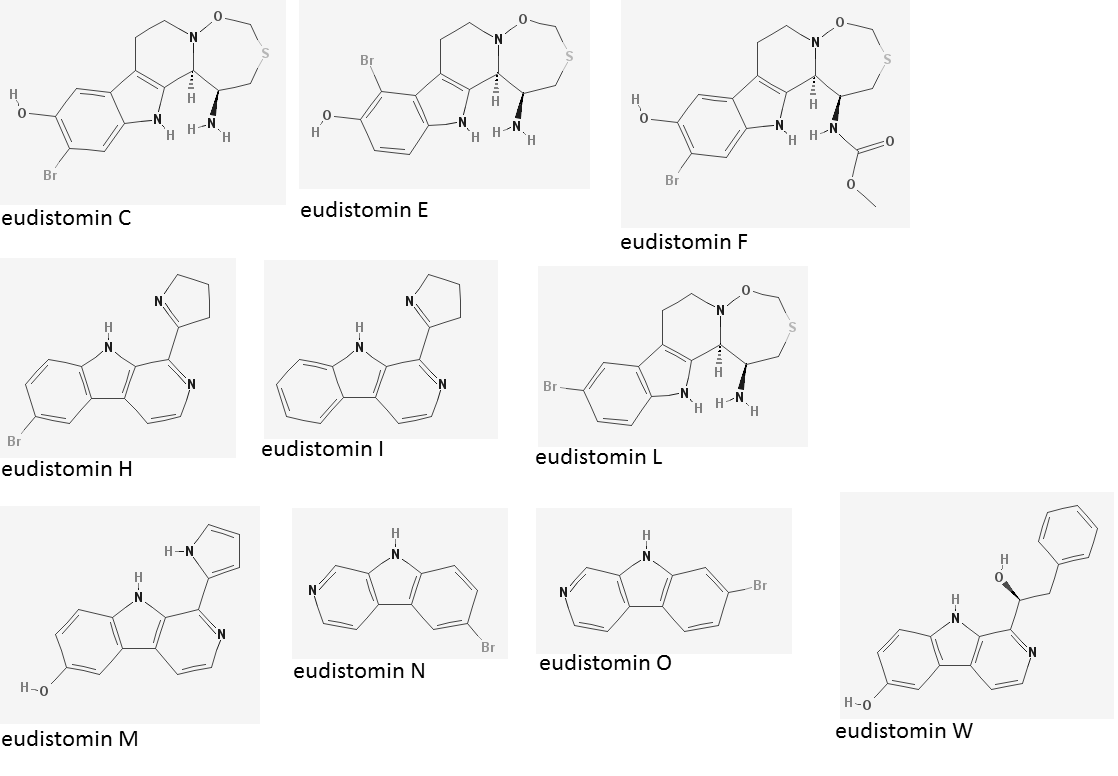
Eudistomins

Eudistomins are β-carboline derivatives, isolated from ascidians (marine tunicates of the family Ascidiacea), like Ritterella sigillinoides, Lissoclinum fragile, or Pseudodistoma aureum.

== Types of Eudistomin ==
=== Eudistomin C ===
Eudistomin C is a naturally occurring β-carboline derivative which has been found in the Ascidian, Eudistoma Olivaseum. Eudistomin C is a cytotoxic molecule; this cytotoxicity is achieved by the Eudistomin C binds onto the 40S or 80S Ribosomal subunits, which inhibits the process of protein translation, leading to cell death. There are cells that are resistance to Eudistomin C's cytotoxicity, and these cells are called Yeast EudiC Resistance mutants (YER). YER mutants have a RPS14A mutation on the cell's uS11 gene, which encodes for the cell's 40S ribosomal subunit. This produces the RPS14A 40S Ribosomal subunit which confers a resistance against Eudistomin C, preventing protein translation inhibition. Eudistomin C has also shown antitumor and antiviral properties. The exact mechanism of these properties are unknown, however it is believed that its ability to inhibit protein translation is responsible for its antitumor and antiviral properties.

=== Eudistomin U ===
Eudistomin U is a β-carboline derivative. The structure of this molecule is made up of a β-carboline with an aromatic indole at the 1' position, thus also functioning as an indole. Eudistomin C is also a cytotoxic molecule, and its cytotoxicity have been shown to affect certain cancer cell line and human pathogens. A recent study suggested that this cytotoxicity may allow Eudistomin C to bind to DNA molecules. In addition to this, Eudistomin C displayed antibacterial property in Gram-Positive Bacteria. This is due to Eudistomin C damaging the bacteria's cell membrane and interfering with the DNA gyrase function, which directly leads to cell death.
