= 6-Methyltryptamine =

Clinical data
- Other names: 6-Methyl-T; 6-MT; 6-Me-T; PAL-522; PAL522
- Drug class: Serotonin receptor modulator; Serotonin 5-HT_{2A} receptor agonist; Serotonin–dopamine releasing agent
- ATC code: None

Identifiers
- IUPAC name: 2-(6-methyl-1H-indol-3-yl)ethanamine
- CAS Number: 62500-90-7
- PubChem CID: 190006
- ChemSpider: 165022
- ChEBI: CHEBI:125623
- ChEMBL: ChEMBL3330642
- CompTox Dashboard (EPA): DTXSID00978098

Chemical and physical data
- Formula: C_{11}H_{14}N_{2}
- Molar mass: 174.247 g·mol^{−1}
- 3D model (JSmol): Interactive image
- SMILES: CC1=CC2=C(C=C1)C(=CN2)CCN
- InChI: InChI=1S/C11H14N2/c1-8-2-3-10-9(4-5-12)7-13-11(10)6-8/h2-3,6-7,13H,4-5,12H2,1H3; Key:GEVXFHYJXGYXJP-UHFFFAOYSA-N

6-Methyltryptamine (6-Me-T or 6-methyl-T; developmental code name PAL-522) is a serotonin receptor modulator and monoamine releasing agent of the tryptamine family. It is the 6-methyl derivative of tryptamine.

The drug acts as a potent full agonist of the serotonin 5-HT_{2A} receptor, with an EC_{50} of 75.3 nM and an E_{max} of 110%. It is about 10-fold less potent as a serotonin 5-HT_{2A} receptor agonist than tryptamine itself. In addition to its serotonin 5-HT_{2A} receptor agonism, 6-methyltryptamine is a serotonin–dopamine releasing agent (SDRA), with EC_{50} values for induction of monoamine release of 51.6 nM for serotonin, 353 nM for dopamine, and >10,000 nM for norepinephrine in rat brain synaptosomes. It shows extremely weak affinity for the dizocilpine (MK-801) site of the NMDA receptor (IC_{50} = 175,000–260,000 nM).

Tryptamines without substitutions at the amine or alpha carbon, such as tryptamine, serotonin (5-hydroxytryptamine; 5-HT), and 5-methoxytryptamine (5-MeO-T), are known to be very rapidly metabolized and thereby inactivated by monoamine oxidase A (MAO-A) in vivo and to have very short elimination half-lives. However, given intravenously at sufficiently high doses, tryptamine is still known to be able to produce weak and short-lived psychoactive effects in humans.

The chemical synthesis of 6-methyltryptamine has been described.

6-Methyltryptamine was first described in the scientific literature by 1965. Its pharmacology was subsequently assessed in greater detail in 2014.

== See also ==
- Substituted tryptamine
- 6-Methyl-DMT
- 6-Methyl-5-MeO-DMT
- 6-Methoxytryptamine
- 6-Hydroxytryptamine
- 6-Fluorotryptamine
- 6-Bromotryptamine
