= 9-Methyl-β-carboline =

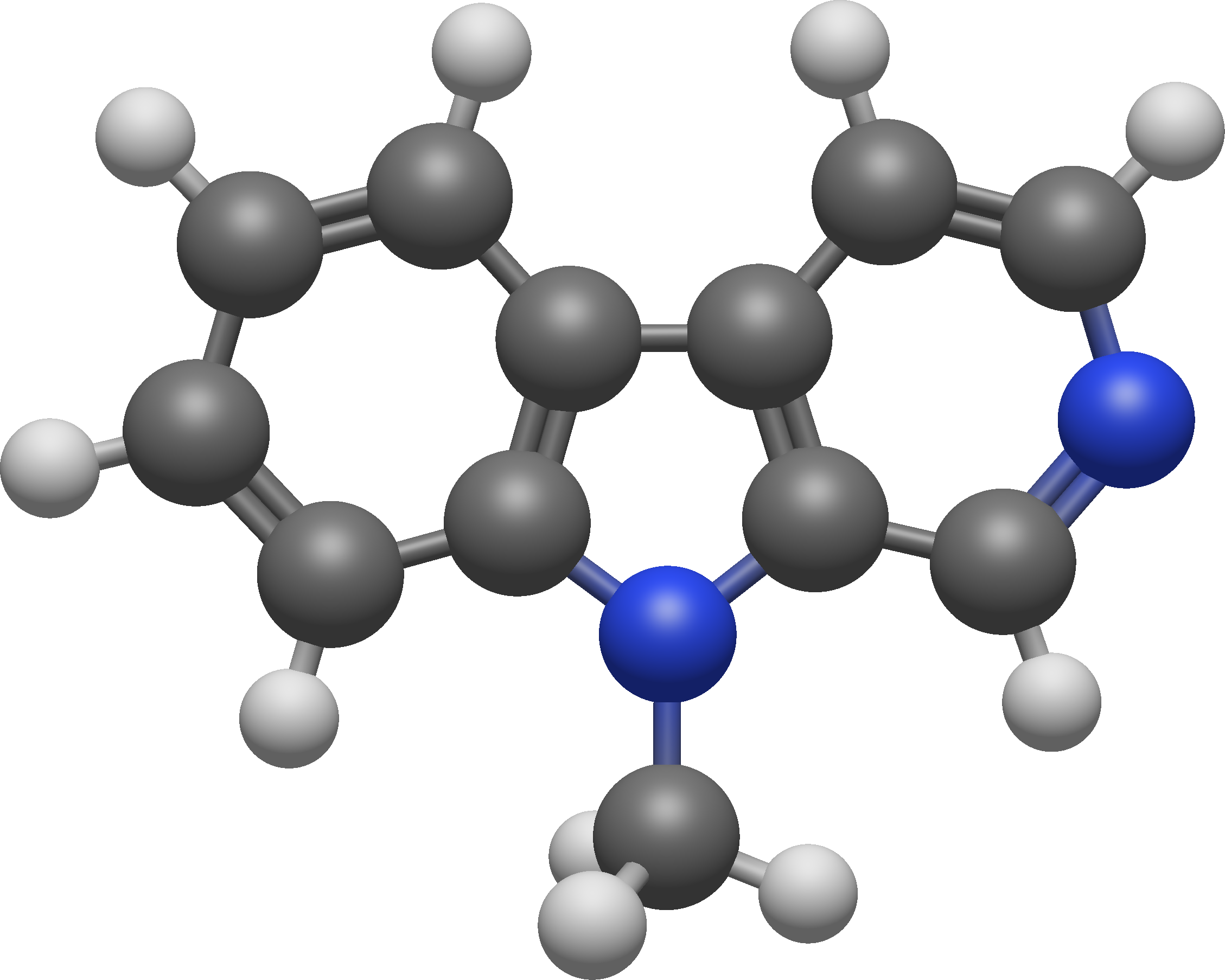

Names
- Preferred IUPAC name 5-Methyl-5H-pyrido[3,4-b]indole
- Other names: 9-Me-BC; 9-Methyl-9H-β-carboline; 9-Methylnorharman; 9-MBC; N-Methyl-β-carboline

Identifiers
CAS Number	2521-07-5
3D model (JSmol)	Interactive image
ChemSpider	144638
MeSH	C529608
PubChem CID	164979
UNII	GC837J2CCJ
CompTox Dashboard (EPA)	DTXSID50179871
- InChI: InChI=1S/C12H10N2/c1-14-11-5-3-2-4-9(11)10-6-7-13-8-12(10)14/h2-8H,1H3 Key: MABOIYXDALNSES-UHFFFAOYSA-N
- SMILES: CN1C2=CC=CC=C2C3=C1C=NC=C3

Properties
Chemical formula	C_{12}H_{10}N_{2}
Molar mass	182.226 g·mol^{−1}
Appearance	White, off-white, or tan powder

Pharmacology
Routes of administration	Oral, sublingual, intranasal
Legal status	In general: legal
- Except where otherwise noted, data are given for materials in their standard state (at 25 °C [77 °F], 100 kPa). Infobox references

9-Methyl-β-carboline (9-Me-BC) is a heterocyclic amine of the β-carboline family, and a research chemical sometimes used as a nootropic. It is a monoamine oxidase inhibitor, primarily of MAO-A.

In mice studies, it has been found to stimulate the growth of dopaminergic neurons and increase gene expression of several neurotrophic factors in both dopamine-depleted and normal brain cultures.

It has been proposed for further investigation in the treatment of Parkinson's disease.

== Chemistry ==
9-Me-BC is a methylated derivative of β-carboline with the molecular formula C_{12}H_{10}N_{2}.

It may be prepared by performing the Eschweiler–Clarke reaction on freebase β-carboline (norharmane)

== Biological effects ==
In vitro studies with dopaminergic neuron cell cultures demonstrated increased expression of tyrosine hydroxylase and associated transcription factors, increased neurite outgrowth, regeneration of neurons after chronic rotenone administration, and reduced expression of inflammatory cytokines. In studies of primary mesencephalic dopaminergic neuron cell cultures, the substance increased the number of differentiated dopaminergic neurons and produced higher levels of transcription factors associated with dopaminergic differentiation.

9-Me-BC also inhibited the oxidation of the neurotoxin precursor MPTP to the dopaminergic neurotoxin MPP^{+} in vitro and displayed protective effects against the neurotoxin 2,9-DiMe-BC^{+} (2,9-dimethyl-β-carbolinium); although there are concerns about its chemical similarity to 9-Me-BC itself. These findings suggest that it could potentially defend against other dopaminergic neurotoxins as well.

The administration of the dopamine antagonist sulpiride which antagonizes D2 and D3 receptors did not have a significant effect on the observed increase of dopaminergic TH^{+} neurons after treatment with the chemical, suggesting that the neurostimulative effect of 9-Me-BC functions independently of these two receptors.

When the DAT by which 9-Me-BC is taken up into and subsequently enters the neuron through is blocked, the observed proliferation of dopaminergic neurons was abolished, but neurite outgrowth was not. This leads to the hypothesis that the neurite outgrowth perhaps functions through a separate mechanism such as through the uptake of 9-Me-BC into dopaminergic astrocyte cells via an organic cation transporter (OCT), rather than the DAT. The former result further substantiates that 9-Me-BC is indeed a substrate for the dopamine transporter.

Rodent studies in vivo demonstrated elevated hippocampal dopamine levels, improved spatial learning performance in a radial maze test, and increased dendrite outgrowth in the dentate gyrus of the hippocampus, as well as restoration of the number of tyrosine hydroxylase expressing neurons in the left striatum after an injection of MPP^{+} had reduced the number of such cells by 50% in an animal model of Parkinsonism.

In in-vitro murine midbrain cell cultures, a maximum 33% increase in the number of dopaminergic tyrosine hydroxylase neurons (TH+) after 48 hours of treatment with 9-Me-BC was observed. These effects were found at 90 μM of 9-Me-BC, while higher concentrations of 125 μM and 150 μM progressively decreased the number of dopaminergic neurons.

In cortical dopaminergic astrocytes taken from mice, it significantly increased the gene expression of brain-derived neurotrophic factor (BDNF) by 2-fold. The study also found an increase in the expression of NCAM1, TGF-β2, Skp1, neurotrophin 3, and artemin factors by 1.4-fold, 1.4-fold, 1.5-fold, 1.8-fold, and 3.2-fold respectively. Skp1 may increase the turnover rate of the α-synuclein protein, whose accumulation is associated with Parkinson's disease.

Administration of LY-294002, an inhibitor of the Pi3K/Akt pathway, completely blocked the neurostimulative properties of 9-Me-BC to TH^{+} neurons, implying that this pathway is critical to its effect on neuronal growth.

9-Me-BC may possess photosensitizing effects.

== Pharmacological effects ==
9-Me-BC is a known inhibitor of monoamine oxidase A and monoamine oxidase B, with IC50 values of 1 μM for MAO-A and 15.5 μM for MAO-B, suggesting that it is more selective for MAO-A like other beta-carbolines.

== See also ==
- Substituted β-carboline
- Harmane
- Gacyclidine
