= Nostocarboline =

Names
- Preferred IUPAC name 6-Chloro-2-methyl-9H-pyrido[3,4-b]indol-2-ium

Identifiers
| CAS Number | 874440-44-5; 874351-71-0 (iodide salt) |
| 3D model (JSmol) | Interactive image |
| ChemSpider | 4483628 |
| PubChem CID | 5326150 |
| CompTox Dashboard (EPA) | DTXSID301333786 |
- InChI: InChI=1S/C12H9ClN2/c1-15-5-4-9-10-6-8(13)2-3-11(10)14-12(9)7-15/h2-7H,1H3/p+1 Key: RGQUDRQSJYJYAQ-UHFFFAOYSA-O
- SMILES: C[N+]1=CC2=C(C=C1)C3=C(N2)C=CC(=C3)Cl

Properties
| Chemical formula | C_{12}H_{10}ClN_{2}^{+} |
| Molar mass | 217.68 g/mol |
- Except where otherwise noted, data are given for materials in their standard state (at 25 °C [77 °F], 100 kPa). Infobox references

Nostocarboline is a β-carboline alkaloid isolated from a freshwater cyanobacterium.

== See also ==
- Substituted β-carboline
