= Tipindole =

Serotonin antagonist

Clinical data
- Other names: Tipindol; Typindol; Typindole

Identifiers
- IUPAC name: 2-(dimethylamino)ethyl 1,3,4,5-tetrahydrothiopyrano[4,3-b]indole-8-carboxylate
- CAS Number: 7489-66-9
- PubChem CID: 65595
- ChemSpider: 59036
- UNII: US65H9WBNH
- ChEMBL: ChEMBL494521
- CompTox Dashboard (EPA): DTXSID70225869

Chemical and physical data
- Formula: C_{16}H_{20}N_{2}O_{2}S
- Molar mass: 304.41 g·mol^{−1}
- 3D model (JSmol): Interactive image
- SMILES: CN(C)CCOC(=O)C1=CC2=C(C=C1)NC3=C2CSCC3
- InChI: InChI=1S/C16H20N2O2S/c1-18(2)6-7-20-16(19)11-3-4-14-12(9-11)13-10-21-8-5-15(13)17-14/h3-4,9,17H,5-8,10H2,1-2H3; Key:WNDHLINIYZAWCR-UHFFFAOYSA-N

Tipindole (INN), also known as typindole, is a drug of the tricyclic family described as a serotonin antagonist and monoamine oxidase inhibitor (MAOI) which was never marketed. The drug was developed by Soviet researchers and was first described by 1962.

== See also ==
- Substituted β-carboline § Related compounds
- List of Russian drugs
