= Tetrahydroharman =

Names
- Preferred IUPAC name 1-Methyl-2,3,4,9-tetrahydro-1H-pyrido[3,4-b]indole
- Systematic IUPAC name 1-Methyl-1H,2H,3H,4H,9H-pyrido[3,4-b]indole
- Other names Elaeagnine; Methtryptoline; Tetrahydroharmane

Identifiers
CAS Number	525-40-6; 23844-21-5 (1S); 2254-36-6 (1R); 2506-10-7
3D model (JSmol)	Interactive image
ChEBI	CHEBI:311872
ChemSpider	82643; 614612 (1S); 390581 (1R)
EC Number	219-711-4
KEGG	C09089
MeSH	Tetrahydroharmane
PubChem CID	91522 (); 704991 (1S); 442025 (1R)
CompTox Dashboard (EPA)	DTXSID901027440
- InChI: InChI=1S/C15H13NO3/c1-19-12-8-6-11(7-9-12)10-16-14-5-3-2-4-13(14)15(17)18/h2-10H,1H3,(H,17,18)/b16-10+ Key: SZIDPRXJWMIIJF-MHWRWJLKSA-N; InChI=1S/C12H14N2/c1-8-12-10(6-7-13-8)9-4-2-3-5-11(9)14-12/h2-5,8,13-14H,6-7H2,1H3 Key: LPIJOZBIVDCQTE-UHFFFAOYSA-N
- SMILES: CC1NCCC2=C1NC1=CC=CC=C21

Properties
Chemical formula	C_{12}H_{14}N_{2}
Molar mass	186.25296 g/mol
- Except where otherwise noted, data are given for materials in their standard state (at 25 °C [77 °F], 100 kPa). verify (what is ?) Infobox references

Tetrahydroharman, or tetrahydroharmane, also known as 1-methyl-1,2,3,4-tetrahydro-β-carboline, is a β-carboline and general name for one of two isomers:

1. (1S)-1-methyl-2,3,4,9-tetrahydro-1H-pyrido[3,4-b]indole
2. Calligonine ((1R)-1-methyl-2,3,4,9-tetrahydro-1H-pyrido[3,4-b]indole)

Calligonine is a major alkaloid constituent of the roots of Calligonum minimum and the bark of Elaeagnus angustifolia. When taken internally, it has the effect of substantially lowering blood pressure for an extended period of time, similar to reserpine.

== See also ==
- Substituted β-carboline
- Peganum harmala
- Harmala alkaloid
