= Tetrahydroharmol =

Chemical compound

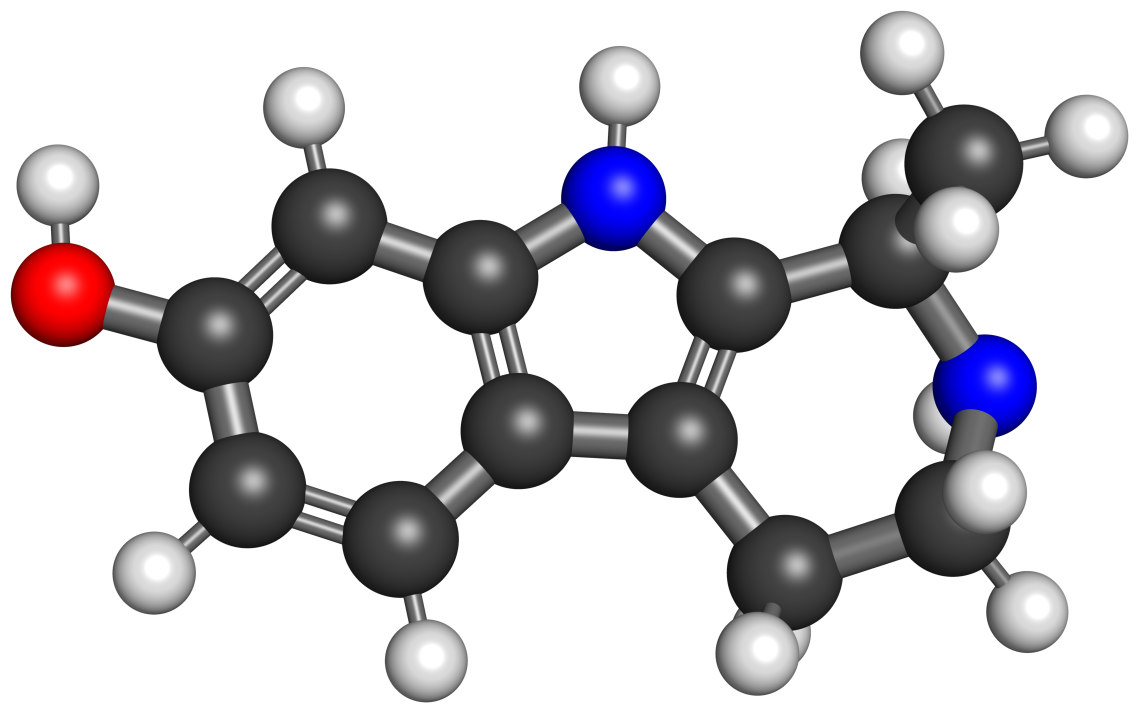

Clinical data
- Other names: 1,2-Dihydroharmaline

Identifiers
- IUPAC name: 1-methyl-2,3,4,9-tetrahydro-1H-pyrido[3,4-b]indol-7-ol
- CAS Number: 17952-75-9
- PubChem CID: 368982
- ChemSpider: 327573
- UNII: DHR7GV467K
- ChEMBL: ChEMBL14122
- CompTox Dashboard (EPA): DTXSID101027096

Chemical and physical data
- Formula: C_{12}H_{14}N_{2}O
- Molar mass: 202.257 g·mol^{−1}
- 3D model (JSmol): Interactive image
- SMILES: CC1C2=C(CCN1)C3=C(N2)C=C(C=C3)O
- InChI: InChI=1S/C12H14N2O/c1-7-12-10(4-5-13-7)9-3-2-8(15)6-11(9)14-12/h2-3,6-7,13-15H,4-5H2,1H3; Key:AZTMWIPCEFFOJD-UHFFFAOYSA-N

Tetrahydroharmol is a bioactive β-carboline and harmala alkaloid. It acts as a reversible inhibitor of monoamine oxidase A.

== Society and culture ==
=== Legal status ===
==== Australia ====
Harmala alkaloids are considered Schedule 9 prohibited substances under the Poisons Standard (October 2015). A Schedule 9 substance is a substance which may be abused or misused, the manufacture, possession, sale or use of which should be prohibited by law except when required for medical or scientific research, or for analytical, teaching or training purposes with approval of Commonwealth and/or State or Territory Health Authorities.

== See also ==
- Substituted β-carboline
- Tetrahydroharmine
- Harmol
