= 5-Methoxyharmalan =

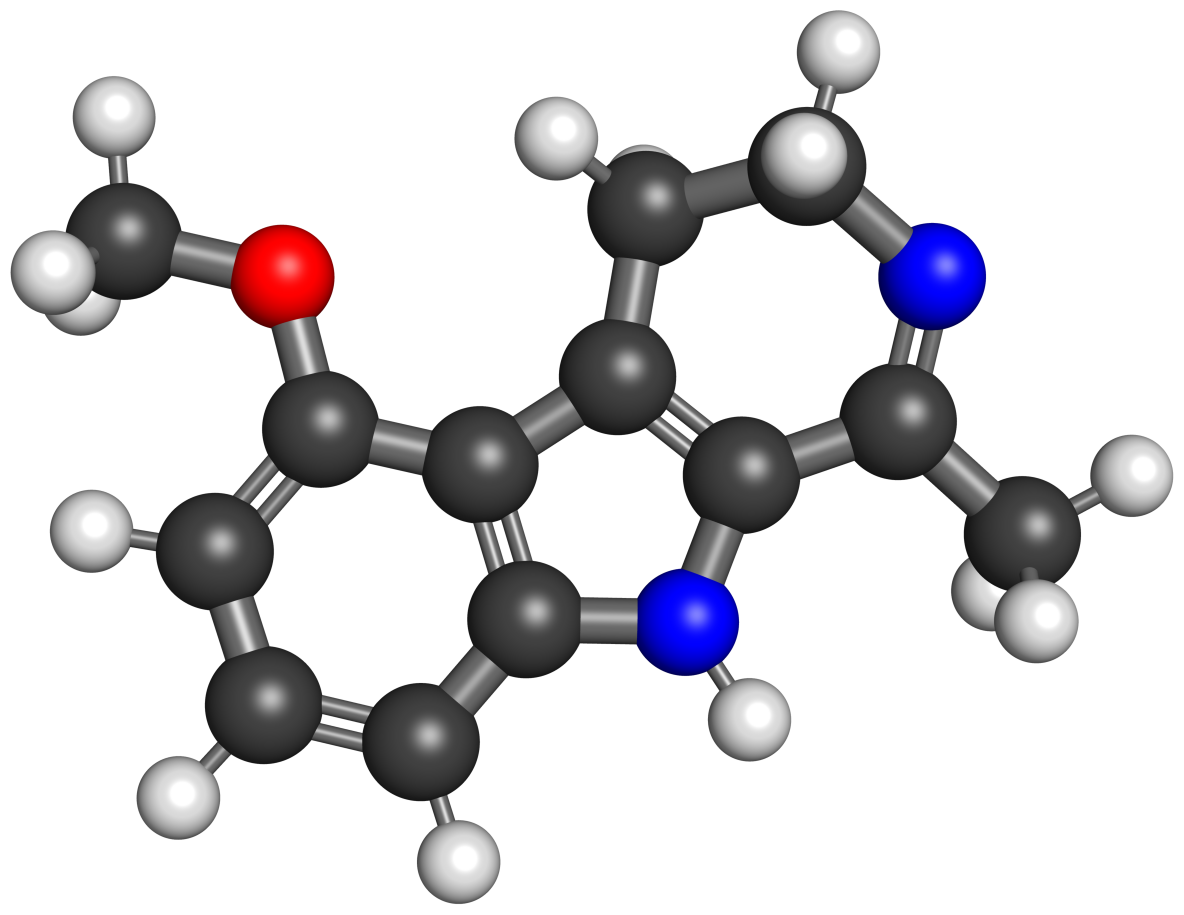

Clinical data
- Other names: 5-MeO-harmalan; 5-OMe-harmalan; 5-Methoxy-1-methyl-4,9-dihydro-3H-β-carboline
- Drug class: Serotonin receptor modulator
- ATC code: None

Identifiers
- IUPAC name: 5-methoxy-1-methyl-4,9-dihydro-3H-pyrido[3,4-b]indole
- PubChem CID: 137193151
- ChemSpider: 62968019
- ChEMBL: ChEMBL4784346

Chemical and physical data
- Formula: C_{13}H_{14}N_{2}O
- Molar mass: 214.268 g·mol^{−1}
- 3D model (JSmol): Interactive image
- SMILES: CC1=NCCC2=C1NC3=C2C(=CC=C3)OC
- InChI: InChI=1S/C13H14N2O/c1-8-13-9(6-7-14-8)12-10(15-13)4-3-5-11(12)16-2/h3-5,15H,6-7H2,1-2H3; Key:RFGOJFHLZUEUIV-UHFFFAOYSA-N

5-Methoxyharmalan, also known as 5-methoxy-1-methyl-4,9-dihydro-3H-β-carboline, is a serotonin receptor modulator of the β-carboline family. It is a cyclized tryptamine analogue of 4-MeO-DMT and a positional isomer of 6-methoxyharmalan and harmaline (7-methoxyharmalan).

== Pharmacology ==
The drug shows high affinity for the serotonin 5-HT_{2A} and 5-HT_{2C} receptors (K_{i} = 86–137 nM and 69 nM, respectively). It had higher affinity for these receptors than any other assessed β-carboline, with 1.7–4.6-fold, 57–58-fold, and >73–116-fold the affinity of harmine, harmaline, and tetrahydroharmine for the serotonin 5-HT_{2A} receptor, respectively. However, like harmaline and 6-methoxyharmalan, 5-methoxyharmalan showed no agonist or antagonist activity at the serotonin 5-HT_{2A} receptor in terms of phosphatidylinositol (PI) hydrolysis in vitro at concentrations of up to 10,000 nM (and harmaline further showed no agonist activity in this assay at up to 20,000 nM). It is unclear whether the serotonin 5-HT_{2A} receptor is involved in the hallucinogenic or other psychoactive effects of β-carbolines.

5-Methoxyharmalan showed no affinity for the melatonin receptors. The 1-demethyl analogue of 5-methoxyharmalan shows high affinity for the imidazoline I_{2} receptor and the α_{2} receptor, whereas 5-methoxyharmalan itself was not assessed.

== History ==
5-Methoxyharmalan was first described in the scientific literature by 1993.

== See also ==
- Substituted β-carboline
- 6-Methoxyharmalan
- Harmaline (7-methoxyharmalan)
