= Norharmine =

Names
- Preferred IUPAC name 7-Methoxy-9H-pyrido[3,4-b]indole
- Other names 7-Methoxy-β-carboline; 7-MeO-βC

Identifiers
CAS Number	6253-19-6
3D model (JSmol)	Interactive image
ChEMBL	ChEMBL6470
ChemSpider	7991320
PubChem CID	9815570
UNII	PVU54KD9C5
CompTox Dashboard (EPA)	DTXSID30431161
- InChI: InChI=1S/C12H10N2O/c1-15-8-2-3-9-10-4-5-13-7-12(10)14-11(9)6-8/h2-7,14H,1H3 Key: LMDPJJFWLNRVEH-UHFFFAOYSA-N; InChI=1/C12H10N2O/c1-15-8-2-3-9-10-4-5-13-7-12(10)14-11(9)6-8/h2-7,14H,1H3 Key: LMDPJJFWLNRVEH-UHFFFAOYAY
- SMILES: COC1=CC2=C(C=C1)C3=C(N2)C=NC=C3

Properties
Chemical formula	C_{12}H_{10}N_{2}O
Molar mass	198.225 g·mol^{−1}
- Except where otherwise noted, data are given for materials in their standard state (at 25 °C [77 °F], 100 kPa). Infobox references

Norharmine also known as 7-methoxy-β-carboline (7-MeO-βC), is an alkaloid of the β-carboline family, it is naturally extracted from Peganum harmala.

== See also ==
- Substituted β-carboline
