= 6-MeO-THH =

Chemical compound

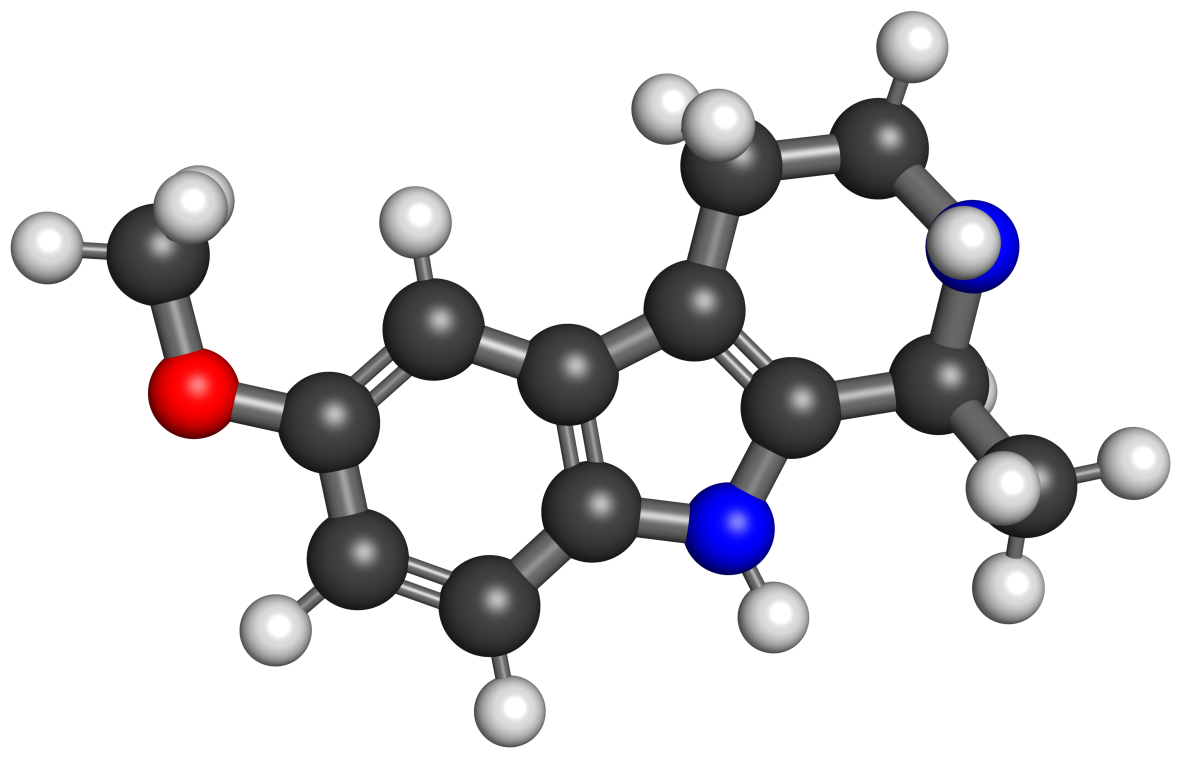

Clinical data
- Other names: 6-Methoxy-1,2,3,4-tetrahydroharman; 6-Methoxytetrahydroharman
- Routes of administration: Oral
- Drug class: Hallucinogen; Oneirogen; Serotonin receptor modulator
- ATC code: None

Pharmacokinetic data
- Onset of action: Unknown
- Duration of action: Unknown

Identifiers
- IUPAC name: 6-Methoxy-1-methyl-2,3,4,9-tetrahydro-1H-pyrido[3,4-b]indole
- CAS Number: 1210-56-6
- PubChem CID: 71028
- ChemSpider: 64188
- UNII: U18P8J9O2I
- ChEMBL: ChEMBL221811
- CompTox Dashboard (EPA): DTXSID20871835

Chemical and physical data
- Formula: C_{13}H_{16}N_{2}O
- Molar mass: 216.284 g·mol^{−1}
- 3D model (JSmol): Interactive image
- Melting point: 152–155 °C (306–311 °F)
- SMILES: CC1NCCC2=C1NC(C=C3)=C2C=C3OC
- InChI: InChI=1S/C13H16N2O/c1-8-13-10(5-6-14-8)11-7-9(16-2)3-4-12(11)15-13/h3-4,7-8,14-15H,5-6H2,1-2H3; Key:RDUORFDQRFHYBF-UHFFFAOYSA-N

6-MeO-THH, also known as 6-methoxy-1,2,3,4-tetrahydroharman, is a β-carboline (or more specifically a pinoline) derivative and a structural isomer of tetrahydroharmine (7-MeO-THH). It is mentioned in Alexander Shulgin's book TiHKAL (Tryptamines I Have Known and Loved), stating that 6-MeO-THH is very similar to the other carbolines. The compound has been isolated from certain plants of the Virola family.

== Use and effects ==
6-MeO-THH is reported to be hallucinogenic similarly to other β-carbolines like harmaline. Limited testing suggests that it possesses mild psychoactive effects at a dose of 1.5 mg/kg (~100 mg for a 70-kg person) orally and is said to be about one-third as potent as 6-methoxyharmalan and three times as potent as harmaline. Its dose range and duration are unknown.

== Pharmacology ==
=== Pharmacodynamics ===
Very little is known about the psychoactivity of 6-MeO-THH in humans. Studies in rats have shown it to bind to a number of serotonin 5-HT_{1} receptors and 5-HT_{2} receptors, dopamine D_{2} receptors, benzodiazepine receptors, and imidazoline receptors.

== Chemistry ==
=== Synthesis ===
The chemical synthesis of 6-MeO-THH has been described.

== Society and culture ==
=== Legal status ===
==== Canada ====
6-MeO-THH is not a controlled substance in Canada as of 2025.

== See also ==
- Substituted β-carboline
- Harmala alkaloid
- 6-Methoxyharmalan
