= 6-Methoxyharmalan =

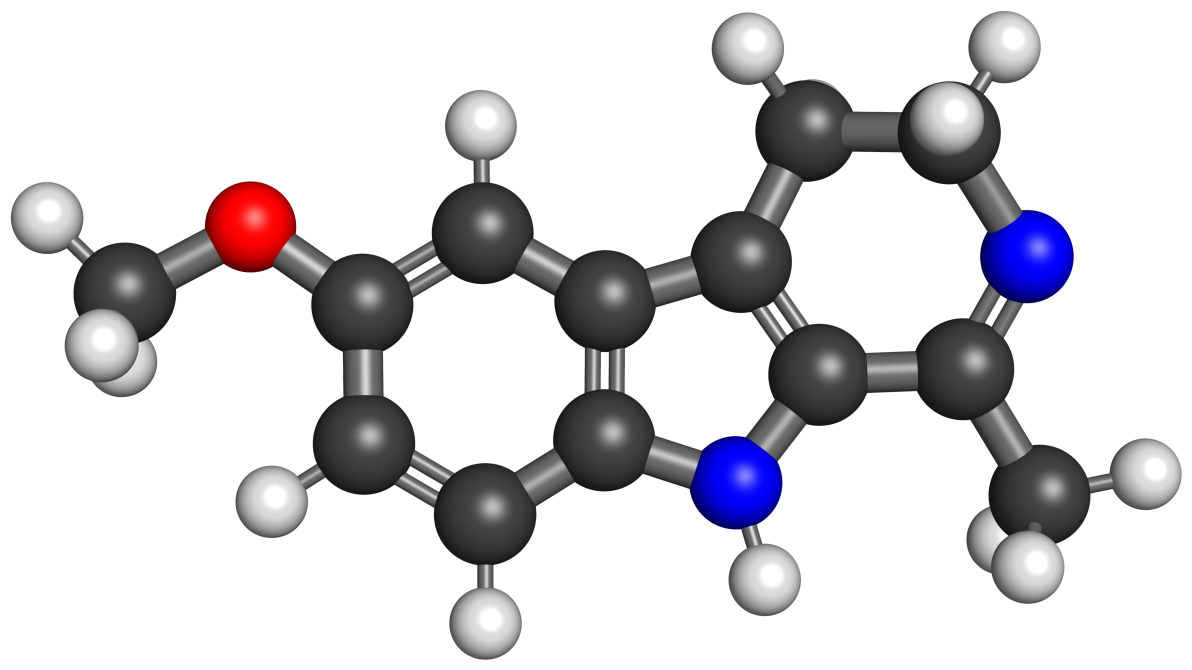

Clinical data
- Other names: 6-Methoxyharmalane; 6-Methoxy-1-methyl-3,4-dihydro-β-carboline; 10-Methoxyharmalan; 6-MeO-harmalan; 6-OMe-harmalan; 6-Methoxy-3,4-dihydroharman; 6-MeO-DHH
- Routes of administration: Oral, intravenous injection
- Drug class: Hallucinogen; Oneirogen; Monoamine oxidase inhibitor; Reversible inhibitor of MAO-A; Serotonin receptor modulator
- ATC code: None

Pharmacokinetic data
- Onset of action: Oral: 1 hour IV: almost immediate

Identifiers
- IUPAC name: 6-methoxy-1-methyl-4,9-dihydro-3H-pyrido[3,4-b]indole
- CAS Number: 3589-73-9
- PubChem CID: 417052
- ChemSpider: 10522291
- UNII: 43F45VJV8C
- ChEBI: CHEBI:92962
- ChEMBL: ChEMBL338115
- CompTox Dashboard (EPA): DTXSID80957306

Chemical and physical data
- Formula: C_{13}H_{14}N_{2}O
- Molar mass: 214.268 g·mol^{−1}
- 3D model (JSmol): Interactive image
- SMILES: CC1=NCCC2=C1NC3=C2C=C(C=C3)OC
- InChI: InChI=1S/C13H14N2O/c1-8-13-10(5-6-14-8)11-7-9(16-2)3-4-12(11)15-13/h3-4,7,15H,5-6H2,1-2H3; Key:HMBHRMFLDKKSCT-UHFFFAOYSA-N

6-Methoxyharmalan, or 6-methoxyharmalane, also known as 6-methoxy-1-methyl-3,4-dihydro-β-carboline, is a naturally occurring serotonin receptor modulator, monoamine oxidase inhibitor, and hallucinogen of the β-carboline family related to harmaline (7-methoxyharmalan). It is a cyclized tryptamine and analogue of 5-MeO-DMT and melatonin (N-acetyl-5-methoxytryptamine). The compound has been isolated from Virola species.

== Use and effects ==
6-Methoxyharmalan has been reported to be hallucinogenic in humans at a dose of 1.5 mg/kg (~100 mg) orally, with slightly (1.5-fold) greater potency than harmaline. Its onset of action via oral administration is about 1 hour. The drug also produces hallucinogenic effects at a dose of 1 mg/kg intravenously and with a near-immediate onset by this route. Its hallucinogenic effects are described as similar to those of harmaline. The hallucinogenic effects of β-carbolines like harmaline and 6-methoxyharmalan have been described as qualitatively distinct from those of serotonergic psychedelics like mescaline. On the other hand, they have been said to be similar to those of ibogaine.

== Pharmacology ==
=== Pharmacodynamics ===
6-Methoxyharmalan activities
Target	Affinity (K_{i}, nM)
5-HT_{1A}	>10,000
5-HT_{1B}	>10,000
5-HT_{1D}	>10,000
5-HT_{1E}	ND
5-HT_{1F}	ND
5-HT_{2A}	4,220–5,600 (K_{i}) (rat) >10,000 (EC_{50}) >10,000 (IC_{50})
5-HT_{2B}	ND
5-HT_{2C}	924 (rat)
5-HT_{3}	>10,000
5-HT_{4}	ND
5-HT_{5A}	>10,000
5-HT_{6}	1,930
5-HT_{7}	2,960
α_{1A}–α_{1D}	ND
α_{2A}–α_{2C}	ND
β_{1}, β_{3}	ND
D_{1}–D_{5}	>10,000 (human/rat)
H_{1}–H_{4}	ND
M_{1}–M_{5}	>10,000
I_{1}, I_{2}	ND
σ_{1}, σ_{2}	ND
TAAR1	ND
BDZ	>10,000 (rat)
PCP	>10,000 (rat)
SERT	>10,000 (K_{i})
NET	4,100 (K_{i})
DAT	>10,000 (K_{i}) (bovine)
MAO-A	ND (IC_{50})
MAO-B	ND (IC_{50})
Notes: The smaller the value, the more avidly the drug binds to the site. All proteins are human unless otherwise specified. Refs:

6-Methoxyharmalan shows modest affinity for the serotonin 5-HT_{2A} receptor (K_{i} = 4,220–5,600 nM) and for the serotonin 5-HT_{2C} receptor (K_{i} = 924 nM). Its affinity for the serotonin 5-HT_{2A} receptor is similar to that of harmaline. Despite their appreciable affinities for the serotonin 5-HT_{2A} receptor, neither 6-methoxyharmalan nor harmaline showed any agonist or antagonist activity at the receptor at a concentration of 10,000 nM (and also at 20,000 nM in the case of harmaline). On the other hand, 6-methoxyharmalan has been reported to be a potent serotonin antagonist in other in-vitro systems, such as the isolated rat uterus and isolated guinea pig ileum. 6-Methoxyharmalan does not bind to the serotonin 5-HT_{1A} receptor or the dopamine D_{2} receptor. However, it does also bind to the serotonin 5-HT_{6} and 5-HT_{7} receptors (K_{i} = 1,930 nM and 2,960 nM, respectively), but not to various other serotonin receptors, the serotonin transporter (SERT), or a variety of other targets. The compound has also been reported to be a very weak glycine receptor antagonist (IC_{50} = 82,000–101,000 nM). Besides receptor and transporter interactions, 6-methoxyharmalan has been reported to be a potent monoamine oxidase inhibitor (MAOI).

Similarly to harmaline, but in contrast to harman and harmine, 6-methoxyharmalan substitutes for the serotonergic psychedelic DOM in rodent drug discrimination tests. In addition, 6-methoxyharmalan fully substitutes for the atypical hallucinogen ibogaine in drug discrimination tests, whereas harmaline partially to fully substitutes for ibogaine in these tests.

It is unclear whether the serotonin 5-HT_{2A} receptor mediates the hallucinogenic effects of 6-methoxyharmalan and other β-carbolines or not. While 6-methoxyharmalan and harmaline showed no serotonin 5-HT_{2A} receptor agonistic activity in vitro, there could be limitations of the assay or they might have active metabolites that activate the receptor instead, among other possibilities. Alternatively, the hallucinogenic effects of these compounds may not be mediated by serotonin 5-HT_{2A} receptor activation. This would be in accordance with their hallucinogenic effects being described as distinct from those of psychedelics like mescaline but similar to those of the structurally related ibogaine. Moreover, the relatively selective serotonin 5-HT_{2A} receptor antagonist pirenperone did not affect harmaline's substitution of ibogaine in rodent drug discrimination tests.

== History ==
6-Methoxyharmalan was first described by at least the early 1960s. Its hallucinogenic effects were first described by Claudio Naranjo in 1967. Melatonin can easily undergo cyclization into 6-methoxyharmalan under physiological conditions in vitro and 6-methoxyharmalan has been hypothesized to be a minor metabolite of melatonin in vivo. It was once suggested, by William McIsaac and colleagues in the early 1960s, that excessive production of 6-methoxyharmalan from melatonin might be involved in the pathophysiology of psychiatric disorders. However, all attempts to find 6-methoxyharmalan in living organisms were unsuccessful.

== Society and culture ==
=== Legal status ===
==== Canada ====
6-Methoxyharmalan is not a controlled substance in Canada as of 2025.

== See also ==
- Substituted β-carboline
- 6-MeO-THH (6-methoxy-1,2,3,4-tetrahydroharman)
- Pinoline (6-methoxy-1,2,3,4-tetrahydronorharman)
- 5-Methoxyharmalan
- Harmaline (7-methoxyharmalan)
