= 1-Ethyl-6-hydroxytryptoline =

Clinical data
- Other names: 1-Et-6-OH-THβC; Compound 29
- Drug class: Serotonin 5-HT_{2} receptor agonist; Serotonin 5-HT_{2A} receptor agonist; Serotonin 5-HT_{2C} receptor agonist
- ATC code: None

Identifiers
- IUPAC name: 1-ethyl-2,3,4,9-tetrahydro-1H-pyrido[3,4-b]indol-6-ol
- PubChem CID: 3071387
- ChemSpider: 2330921
- ChEMBL: ChEMBL5221228

Chemical and physical data
- Formula: C_{13}H_{16}N_{2}O
- Molar mass: 216.284 g·mol^{−1}
- 3D model (JSmol): Interactive image
- SMILES: CCC1C2=C(CCN1)C3=C(N2)C=CC(=C3)O
- InChI: InChI=1S/C13H16N2O/c1-2-11-13-9(5-6-14-11)10-7-8(16)3-4-12(10)15-13/h3-4,7,11,14-16H,2,5-6H2,1H3; Key:JYRSBENZEDBDCG-UHFFFAOYSA-N

1-Ethyl-6-hydroxytryptoline (1-Et-6-OH-THβC) is a serotonin 5-HT_{2} receptor agonist of the β-carboline family related to tryptoline. It is the 1-ethyl and 6-hydroxy derivative of tryptoline.

The drug has been found to act as a potent agonist of the serotonin 5-HT_{2A} and 5-HT_{2C} receptors, with EC_{50} (E_{max}) values of 195 nM (85%) and 61 nM (98%) in terms of G_{q}-mediated calcium flux, respectively. This is in notable contrast to other β-carbolines like harmine and harmaline, which are inactive as serotonin 5-HT_{2A} receptor agonists. It is also in apparent contrast to tryptoline, which shows very low affinity for the serotonin 5-HT_{2A} receptor (K_{i} = 3,900 nM) and is inactive as an agonist of the serotonin 5-HT_{2B} receptor (K_{B} = >3,000 nM).

The chemical synthesis of 1-ethyl-6-hydroxytryptoline has been described. An analogue, 1-(2,4,5-trimethoxyphenyl)-6-chlorotryptoline, is far more potent as a serotonin 5-HT_{2A} and 5-HT_{2C} receptor agonist in comparison.

1-Ethyl-6-hydroxytryptoline was described in the scientific literature by Meghan J. Orr and colleagues in 2022.

== See also ==
- Substituted β-carboline
- List of miscellaneous serotonin 5-HT_{2A} receptor agonists
- Shepherdine
- Pinoline
- Fenharmane
- 1-Ethyl-β-carboline
