= Harmalol =

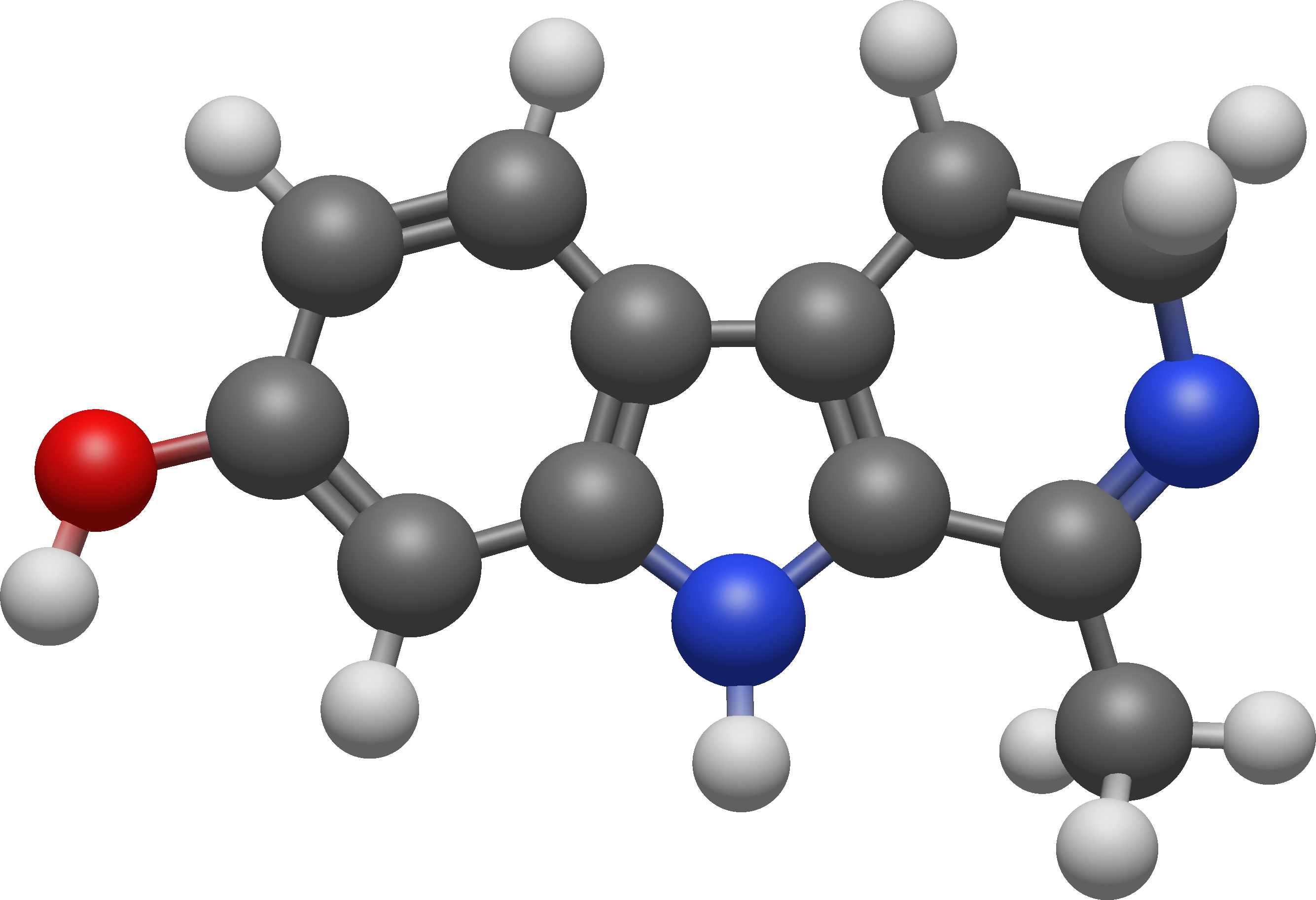

Names
- Preferred IUPAC name 1-Methyl-4,9-dihydro-3H-pyrido[4,3-b]indol-7-ol
- Other names 1-Methyl-4,9-dihydro-3H-β-carbolin-7-ol

Identifiers
CAS Number	525-57-5
3D model (JSmol)	Interactive image
ChemSpider	11262879
ECHA InfoCard	100.007.616
EC Number	208-375-4
PubChem CID	5353656
UNII	2NQN80556Q
CompTox Dashboard (EPA)	DTXSID90975692 DTXSID50894870, DTXSID90975692
- InChI: InChI=1S/C12H12N2O/c1-7-12-10(4-5-13-7)9-3-2-8(15)6-11(9)14-12/h2-3,6,14-15H,4-5H2,1H3 Key: RHVPEFQDYMMNSY-UHFFFAOYSA-N
- SMILES: OC1=CC=C(C(CCN=C3C)=C3N2)C2=C1

Properties
Chemical formula	C_{12}H_{12}N_{2}O
Molar mass	200.241 g·mol^{−1}
Appearance	Red solid
Melting point	100 to 105 °C (212 to 221 °F; 373 to 378 K) (trihydrate)
- Except where otherwise noted, data are given for materials in their standard state (at 25 °C [77 °F], 100 kPa). Infobox references

Harmalol is a bioactive β-carboline and a member of the harmala alkaloids.

== Pharmacology ==
=== Pharmacokinetics ===
The elimination half-life of harmalol has been reported to be 30 to 49 hours.

== Society and culture ==
=== Legal status ===
==== Australia ====
Harmala alkaloids are considered Schedule 9 prohibited substances under the Poisons Standard (October 2015). A Schedule 9 substance is a substance which may be abused or misused, the manufacture, possession, sale or use of which should be prohibited by law except when required for medical or scientific research, or for analytical, teaching or training purposes with approval of Commonwealth and/or State or Territory Health Authorities.

==== Canada ====
Harmalol is a controlled substance in Canada.

== See also ==
- Substituted β-carboline
- 9-Me-Bc
- Dimethyltryptamine (DMT)
