= Harmol =

Names
- IUPAC name 1-Methyl-2,9-dihydropyrido[3,4-b]indol-7-one

Identifiers
CAS Number	487-03-6
3D model (JSmol)	Interactive image
ChEBI	CHEBI:192558
ChEMBL	ChEMBL14285
ChemSpider	10296888
ECHA InfoCard	100.006.951
EC Number	207-645-9
PubChem CID	68094
UNII	7PQ075MCA6
CompTox Dashboard (EPA)	DTXSID10960989 DTXSID10876697, DTXSID10960989
- InChI: InChI=1S/C12H10N2O/c1-7-12-10(4-5-13-7)9-3-2-8(15)6-11(9)14-12/h2-6,13-14H,1H3 Key: LBBJNGFCXDOYMQ-UHFFFAOYSA-N
- SMILES: CC1=C2C(=C3C=CC(=O)C=C3N2)C=CN1

Properties
Chemical formula	C_{12}H_{10}N_{2}O
Molar mass	198.225 g·mol^{−1}
- Except where otherwise noted, data are given for materials in their standard state (at 25 °C [77 °F], 100 kPa). Infobox references

Harmol is a chemical compound classified as a β-carboline. It is readily formed in vivo in humans by O-demethylation of harmine. Its elimination half-life has been reported to be about 1.5 to 2.0 hours.

== See also ==
- Substituted β-carboline
- Harmalol
