= Substituted β-carboline =

Chemical compound

The chemical structure of β-carboline, the parent compound of the β-carbolines.

A substituted β-carboline, also known as a substituted 9H-pyrido[3,4-b]indole, is a chemical compound featuring a β-carboline moiety with one or more substitutions. β-Carbolines include more than one hundred alkaloids and synthetic compounds. The effects of these substances depend on their respective substituent. Natural β-carbolines primarily influence brain functions but can also exhibit antioxidant effects. Synthetically designed β-carboline derivatives have recently been shown to have neuroprotective, cognitive enhancing and anti-cancer properties.

β-Carbolines are indole alkaloids featuring a fused pyridine and indole ring structure similar to tryptamine, forming a three-ringed system with variable saturation in the third ring. β-Carboline alkaloids naturally occur widely in prokaryotes, plants, animals, certain marine tunicates, and foods like coffee and smoked meats, and are also responsible for the fluorescence of scorpion cuticles under ultraviolet light. β-Carbolines occurring naturally in Peganum harmala (Syrian rue) are known as harmala alkaloids.

Some β-carbolines, like harmaline, are hallucinogenic. According to Alexander Shulgin, harmaline is the only β-carboline that has been extensively studied and well-established as a hallucinogen. β-Carbolines are known to act as monoamine oxidase inhibitors (MAOIs), among possessing other activities. They are an essential component of ayahuasca, by inhibiting the metabolism of the psychedelic dimethyltryptamine (DMT).

== Use and effects ==
=== As hallucinogens ===
β-Carbolines are cyclized tryptamines related to serotonergic psychedelics like dimethyltryptamine (DMT) and 5-MeO-DMT. Some simple β-carbolines have been reported to be hallucinogenic and have been referred to as oneirogens. These include harmine, harmaline, tetrahydroharmine, 6-methoxyharmalan, and 6-methoxytetrahydroharman (6-MeO-THH). According to Alexander Shulgin however, harmaline is the only β-carboline that has been extensively studied and well-established as a hallucinogen. β-Carbolines are active both orally and parenterally, with doses, depending on the compound, in the area of 100 to 300 mg or more orally and 1 to 1.5 mg/kg (~70–100 mg for a 70-kg person) intravenously. Although structurally related to psychedelic tryptamines, the hallucinogenic effects of β-carbolines are said to be qualitatively distinct from those of serotonergic psychedelics. Instead, they are described as being similar to those of ibogaine, which is also a cyclized tryptamine and structurally related atypical hallucinogen.

=== As monoamine oxidase inhibitors ===
Various β-carbolines are potent monoamine oxidase inhibitors (MAOIs), more specifically reversible inhibitors of MAO-A (RIMAs). They are used in ayahuasca to inhibit the monoamine oxidase (MAO)-mediated metabolism of the serotonergic psychedelic dimethyltryptamine (DMT) to allow it to be orally active and to have a much longer duration than it would otherwise. They can also used in a similar fashion with 5-MeO-DMT.

=== Doses and durations ===
Oral doses and durations of β-carbolines or harmala alkaloids
Compound	Chemical name	Dose (hallucinogen)	Potency	Dose (MAOI)	Duration
Harman	1-Methyl-β-carboline	>250 mg	Unknown	>250 mg	Unknown
Harmine	7-Methoxyharman	>300 mg	≤50%	140–250 mg	6–8 hours
Harmaline	7-Methoxy-3,4-dihydroharman	150–400 mg	100%	70–150 mg	5–8 hours
Tetrahydroharmine	7-Methoxy-1,2,3,4-tetrahydroharman	≥300 mg	~33%	Unknown	Unknown
6-Methoxyharmalan	6-Methoxy-3,4-dihydroharman	~100 mg	~150%	Unknown	Unknown
6-MeO-THH	6-Methoxy-1,2,3,4-tetrahydroharman	≥100 mg	~50%	Unknown	Unknown
P. harmala seeds	–	≥5–28 g^{a}	–	3–5 g^{a}	Unknown
Footnotes: ^{a} = P. harmala seeds in ground form. They contain 2–7% harmala alkaloids, with 1 teaspoon ≈ 3 g ≈ 60–180 mg alkaloids; 1 tablespoon ≈ 9 g ≈ 200–600 mg alkaloids; and 1 large (OO) gelatin capsule ≈ 0.7 g ≈ 15–45 mg alkaloids. For comparison, B. caapi contains 0.05–1.95% (average 0.45%) harmala alkaloids. Note: Harmine and other β-carbolines have also been tested by non-oral routes such as sublingual, subcutaneous injection, intramuscular injection, and intravenous injection. Refs: See template page.

== Pharmacology ==
The pharmacological effects of specific β-carbolines are dependent on their substituents. For example, the natural β-carboline harmine has substituents on position 7 and 1. Thereby, it acts as a selective inhibitor of the DYRK1A protein kinase, a protein necessary for neurodevelopment. It also exhibits various antidepressant-like effects in rats by interacting with serotonin receptor 2A. Furthermore, it increases levels of the brain-derived neurotrophic factor (BDNF) in rat hippocampus. A decreased BDNF level has been associated with major depression in humans. The antidepressant effect of harmine might also be due to its function as a MAO-A inhibitor by reducing the breakdown of serotonin and noradrenaline.

A synthetic derivative, 9-methyl-β-carboline, has shown neuroprotective effects including increased expression of neurotrophic factors and enhanced respiratory chain activity. This derivative has also been shown to enhance cognitive function, increase dopaminergic neuron count and facilitate synaptic and dendritic proliferation. It also exhibited therapeutic effects in animal models for Parkinson's disease and other neurodegenerative processes.

However, β-carbolines with substituents in position 3 reduce the effect of benzodiazepine on GABA-A receptors and can therefore have convulsive, anxiogenic and memory enhancing effects. Moreover, 3-hydroxymethyl-beta-carboline blocks the sleep-promoting effect of flurazepam in rodents and – by itself – can decrease sleep in a dose-dependent manner. Another derivative, methyl-β-carboline-3-carboxylate, stimulates learning and memory at low doses but can promote anxiety and convulsions at high doses. With modification in position 9 similar positive effects have been observed for learning and memory without promotion of anxiety or convulsion.

β-carboline derivatives also enhance the production of the antibiotic reveromycin A in soil-dwelling Streptomyces species. Specifically, expression of biosynthetic genes is facilitated by binding of the β-carboline to a large ATP-binding regulator of the LuxR family.

Also Lactobacillus spp. secretes a β-carboline (1-acetyl-β-carboline) preventing the pathogenic fungus Candida albicans to change to a more virulent growth form (yeast-to-filament transition). Thereby, β-carboline reverses imbalances in the microbiome composition causing pathologies ranging from vaginal candidiasis to fungal sepsis.

Since β-carbolines also interact with various cancer-related molecules such as DNA, enzymes (GPX4, kinases, etc.) and proteins (ABCG2/BRCP1, etc.), they are also discussed as potential anticancer agents.

=== Hallucinogenic activity ===
The hallucinogenic effects of β-carbolines are said to be qualitatively distinct from those of serotonergic psychedelics like mescaline but similar to those of ibogaine. Along these lines, β-carbolines and ibogaine fully substitute for each other in rodent drug discrimination tests. The mechanism of action of hallucinogens of the β-carboline and ibogaine type is unclear. Findings are conflicting on whether serotonin 5-HT_{2A} receptor activation may be involved or not. β-Carbolines and ibogaine do have low affinity for the serotonin 5-HT_{2A} receptor, but β-carbolines fail to activate the receptor even at very high concentrations. β-Carbolines and ibogaine show stimulus generalization with serotonergic psychedelics like DOM and LSD in rodent drug discrimination tests and this generalization can be blocked by serotonin 5-HT_{2} receptor antagonists. On the other hand, a fairly selective serotonin 5-HT_{2A} receptor antagonist did not affect harmaline's substitution of ibogaine in rodent drug discrimination tests. Moreover, unlike psychedelics, harmine and ibogaine do not produce the head-twitch response, a behavioral proxy of psychedelic effects, in rodents. However, in another study, harmine did produce the head-twitch response.

Although traditional β-carbolines and harmala alkaloids are inactive as serotonin 5-HT_{2A} receptor agonists and do not act as serotonergic psychedelics, certain synthetic tryptoline derivatives, such as pinoline (6-methoxytryptoline), 1-ethyl-6-hydroxytryptoline, and 1-(2,4,5-trimethoxyphenyl)-6-chlorotryptoline, have more recently been found to be potent and high-efficacy serotonin 5-HT_{2A} and 5-HT_{2C} receptor agonists. Both tryptoline and pinoline have been found to partially substitute for LSD in rodent drug discrimination tests similarly to other β-carbolines. The substitution by tryptoline was blocked by the serotonin receptor antagonist pizotifen and by the serotonin synthesis inhibitor para-chlorophenylalanine (PCPA).

=== Monoamine oxidase inhibition and Parkinson's disease ===
The extract of the liana Banisteriopsis caapi has been used by the tribes of the Amazon as an entheogen and was described as a hallucinogen in the middle of the 19th century. In early 20th century, European pharmacists identified harmine as the active substance. This discovery stimulated the interest to further investigate its potential as a medicine. For example, Louis Lewin, a prominent pharmacologist, demonstrated a dramatic benefit in neurological impairments after injections of B. caapi in patients with postencephalitic Parkinsonism. By 1930, it was generally agreed that hypokinesia, drooling, mood, and sometimes rigidity improved by treatment with harmine. Altogether, 25 studies had been published in the 1920s and 1930s about patients with Parkinson's disease and postencephalitic Parkinsonism. The pharmacological effects of harmine have been attributed mainly to its central monoamine oxidase (MAO) inhibitory properties. In-vivo and rodent studies have shown that extracts of Banisteriopsis caapi and also Peganum harmala lead to striatal dopamine release. Furthermore, harmine supports the survival of dopaminergic neurons in MPTP-treated mice. Since harmine also antagonizes N-methyl-d-aspartate (NMDA) receptors, some researchers speculatively attributed the rapid improvement in patients with Parkinson's disease to these antiglutamatergic effects. However, the advent of synthetic anticholinergic drugs at that time led to the total abandonment of harmine.

== Chemical structure ==
Substituted β-carbolines (structural formula).

β-Carbolines belong to the group of indole alkaloids and consist of a pyridine ring that is fused to an indole skeleton. The structure of β-carboline is similar to that of tryptamine, with the ethylamine chain re-connected to the indole ring via an extra carbon atom, to produce a three-ringed structure. The biosynthesis of β-carbolines is believed to follow this route from analogous tryptamines. Different levels of saturation are possible in the third ring which is indicated here in the structural formula by coloring the optionally double bonds red and blue:

== Overview of simple β-carbolines ==
Indole sub.	Aromatic (H_{0})	Dihydro (H_{2})	Tetrahydro (H_{4})	Tryptamine counterpart (Note: With no amine substituents (e.g., methyl groups).)
with a 1-methyl substituent
Ar-H	Harman	Harmalan	Tetrahydroharman	Tryptamine
Ar-5-OH	5-Harmol	5-Harmalol	5-Tetrahydroharmol	4-Hydroxytryptamine
Ar-5-OMe	5-Methoxyharman	5-Methoxyharmalan	5-MeO-THH	4-Methoxytryptamine
Ar-6-OH	6-Harmol	6-Harmalol	6-Tetrahydroharmol	Serotonin (5-HT)
Ar-6-OMe	6-Methoxyharman	6-Methoxyharmalan	6-MeO-THH	5-Methoxytryptamine
Ar-7-OH	Harmol	Harminol	Tetrahydroharmol	6-Hydroxytryptamine
Ar-7-OMe	Harmine	Harmaline	Tetrahydroharmine	6-Methoxytryptamine
with a 1-hydrogen substituent
Ar-H	βC (norharman)	DHβC	Tryptoline (THβC)	Tryptamine
Ar-5-OH	5-HO-βC	5-HO-DHβC	5-HO-THβC	4-Hydroxytryptamine
Ar-5-OMe	5-MeO-βC	5-MeO-DHβC	5-MeO-THβC	4-Methoxytryptamine
Ar-6-OH	6-HO-βC	6-HO-DHβC	6-HO-THβC	Serotonin (5-HT)
Ar-6-OMe	6-MeO-βC	6-MeO-DHβC	Pinoline (6-MeO-THβC)	5-Methoxytryptamine
Ar-7-OH	7-HO-βC	7-HO-DHβC	7-HO-THβC	6-Hydroxytryptamine
Ar-7-OMe	7-MeO-βC	7-MeO-DHβC	7-MeO-THβC	6-Methoxytryptamine
Refs:

== List of simple β-carbolines ==
A list of simple β-carbolines is tabulated by structure below. Their structures may contain the aforementioned bonds marked by red or blue.

Short name	R^{1}	R^{5}	R^{6}	R^{7}	R^{8}	R^{9}	Structure	Tryptamine counterpart
β-Carboline (norharman; βC)	H	H	H	H	H	H	β-Carboline	Tryptamine
Tryptoline (THβC)	H	H	H	H	H	H	Tryptoline	Tryptamine
Harmane	CH_{3}	H	H	H	H	H	Harmane	Tryptamine
Tetrahydroharman	CH_{3}	H	H	H	H	H	Tetrahydroharman	Tryptamine
Harmine	CH_{3}	H	H	OCH_{3}	H	H	Harmine	6-Methoxytryptamine
Harmaline	CH_{3}	H	H	OCH_{3}	H	H	Harmaline	6-Methoxytryptamine
6-Methoxyharman	CH_{3}	H	OCH_{3}	H	H	H	6-Methoxyharman	5-Methoxytryptamine
6-Methoxyharmalan	CH_{3}	H	OCH_{3}	H	H	H	6-Methoxyharmalan	5-Methoxytryptamine
6-HO-THβC	H	H	OH	H	H	H	6-HO-THβC	5-Hydroxytryptamine
Pinoline (6-MeO-THβC)	H	H	OCH_{3}	H	H	H	Pinoline	5-Methoxytryptamine
6-MeO-THH	CH_{3}	H	OCH_{3}	H	H	H	6-MeO-THH	5-Methoxytryptamine
Harmol	CH_{3}	H	H	OH	H	H	Harmol	6-Hydroxytryptamine
Tetrahydroharmol	CH_{3}	H	H	OH	H	H	Tetrahydroharmol	6-Hydroxytryptamine
Harmalol	CH_{3}	H	H	OH	H	H	Harmalol	6-Hydroxytryptamine
Tetrahydroharmine (THH)	CH_{3}	H	H	OCH_{3}	H	H	Tetrahydroharmine	6-Methoxytryptamine
Norharmine	H	H	H	OCH_{3}	H	H	Norharmine	6-Methoxytryptamine
5-Methoxyharmalan	CH_{3}	OCH_{3}	H	H	H	H	5-Methoxyharmalan	4-Methoxytryptamine
9-Methyl-β-carboline	H	H	H	H	H	CH_{3}	9-Me-BC	1-Methyltryptamine
3-Carboxy-THβC	H / CH_{3} / COOH	H	H	H	H	H		–
1-Ethyl-6-hydroxytryptoline	Et	H	OH	H	H	H		5-Hydroxytryptamine
1-(2,4,5-Trimethoxyphenyl)-6-chlorotryptoline	2,4,5-OMePh	H	Cl	H	H	H		5-Chlorotryptamine

== Related compounds ==
Tipindole

Metralindole

Tetrindole

Pirlindole

== Natural occurrence ==
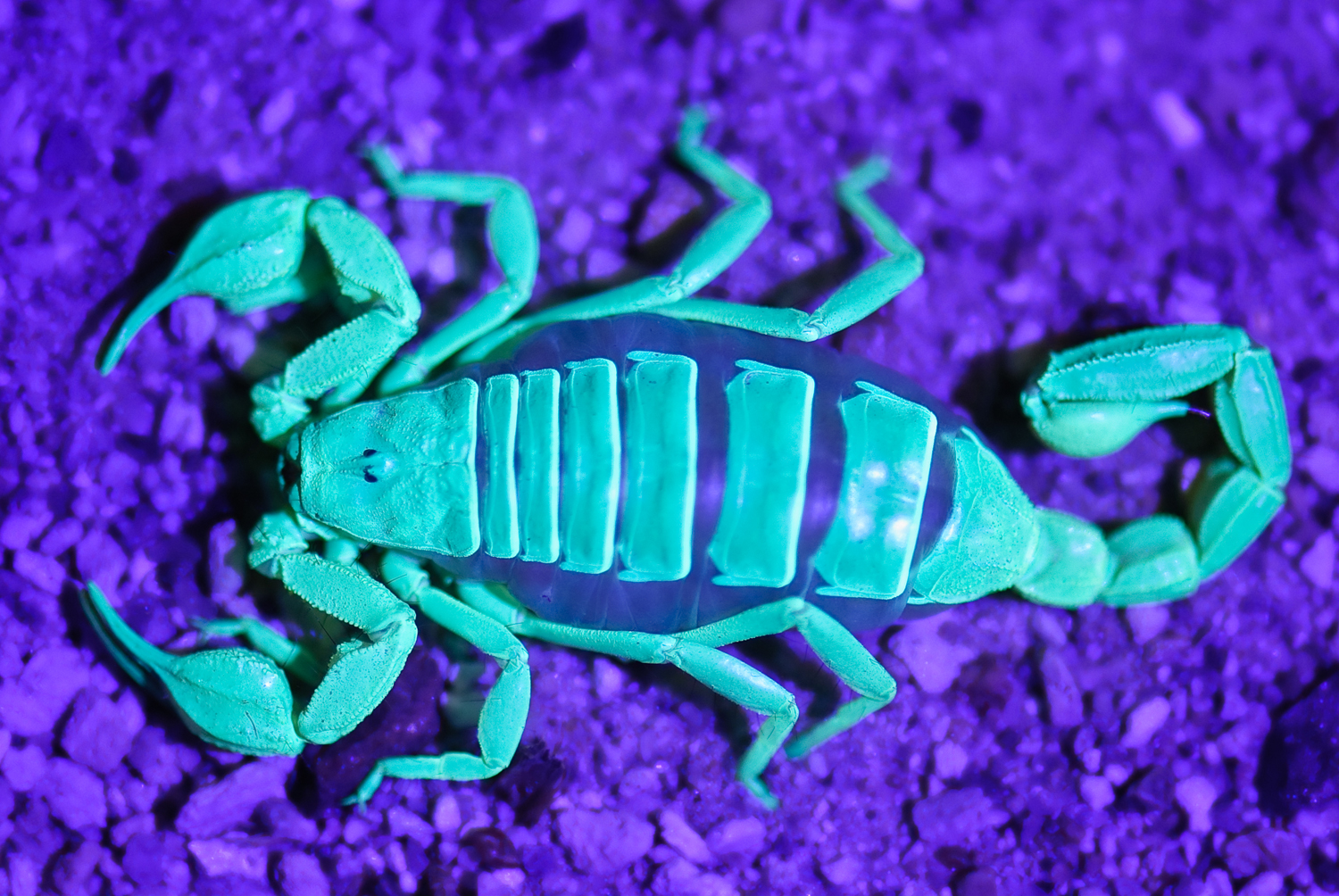
A Paruroctonus scorpion fluorescing under a blacklight.

β-Carboline alkaloids are widespread in prokaryotes, plants and animals. Some β-carbolines, notably tetrahydro-β-carbolines, may be formed naturally in plants and the human body with tryptophan, serotonin and tryptamine as precursors.

- Altogether, eight plant families are known to express 64 different kinds of β-carboline alkaloids. For example, the β-carbolines harmine, harmaline, and tetrahydroharmine are components of the liana Banisteriopsis caapi and play a pivotal role in the pharmacology of the indigenous psychedelic drug ayahuasca. Moreover, the seeds of Peganum harmala (Syrian Rue) contain between 0.16% and 5.9% β-carboline alkaloids (by dry weight).
- A specific group of β-carboline derivatives, termed eudistomins, were extracted from ascidians (marine tunicates of the family Ascidiacea) such as Ritterella sigillinoides, Lissoclinum fragile or Pseudodistoma aureum.
- Nostocarboline was isolated from a freshwater cyanobacterium.
- The fully aromatic β-carbolines also occur in many foodstuffs, however in lower concentrations. The highest amounts have been detected in brewed coffee, raisins, well-done fish and meats. Smoking is another source of fully aromatic β-carbolines, with levels up to thousands of μg per smoker each day.
- β-Carbolines have also been found in the cuticle of scorpions, causing their skin to fluoresce upon exposed to ultraviolet light at certain wavelengths (e.g. blacklight).

== See also ==
- Harmala alkaloid
- Substituted tryptamine
- Substituted tetrahydroisoquinoline
- Iboga-type alkaloid and ibogalog
- Substituted 3-benzazepine
- Pyridopyrroloquinoxaline
