= Β-Carboline =

Group of chemical compounds

β-Carboline

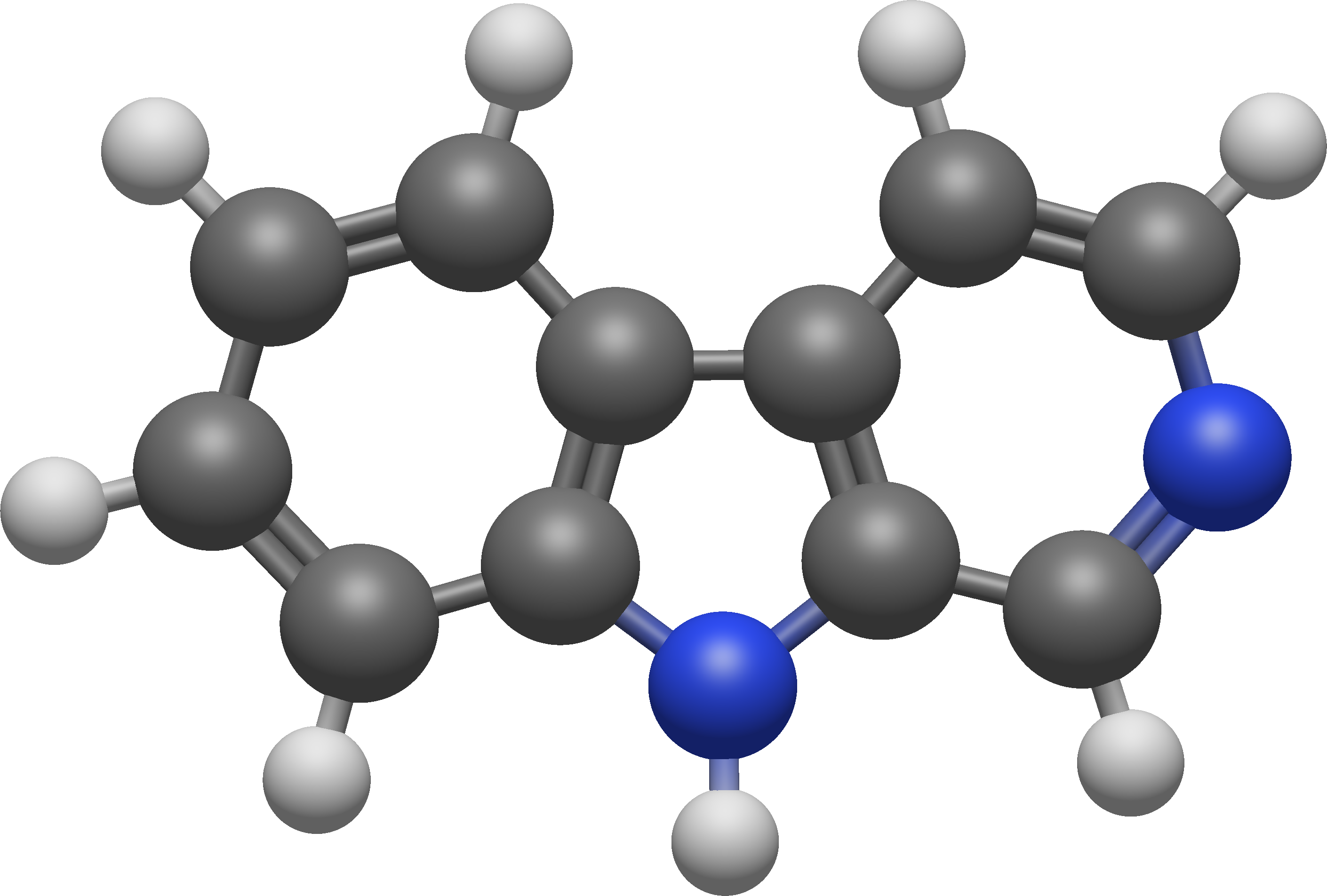

Names
- Preferred IUPAC name 9H-Pyrido[3,4-b]indole
- Other names: Norharmane; Norharman; Carbazoline; 2-Azacarbazole; 2,9-Diazafluorene

Identifiers
CAS Number	244-63-3
3D model (JSmol)	Interactive image
Beilstein Reference	128414
ChEBI	CHEBI:109895
ChEMBL	ChEMBL275224
ChemSpider	58486
ECHA InfoCard	100.005.418
EC Number	205-959-0
IUPHAR/BPS	8222
KEGG	C20157
MeSH	norharman
PubChem CID	64961
UNII	94HMA1I78O
CompTox Dashboard (EPA)	DTXSID2021070
- InChI: InChI=1S/C11H8N2/c1-2-4-10-8(3-1)9-5-6-12-7-11(9)13-10/h1-7,13H Key: AIFRHYZBTHREPW-UHFFFAOYSA-N; InChI=1/C11H8N2/c1-2-4-10-8(3-1)9-5-6-12-7-11(9)13-10/h1-7,13H Key: AIFRHYZBTHREPW-UHFFFAOYAG
- SMILES: c1ccc3c(c1)[nH]c2cnccc23

Properties
Chemical formula	C_{11}H_{8}N_{2}
Molar mass	168.20 g/mol
- Except where otherwise noted, data are given for materials in their standard state (at 25 °C [77 °F], 100 kPa). verify (what is ?) Infobox references

β-Carboline, also known as norharman, norharmane, or 9H-pyrido[3,4-b]indole, is a tricyclic chemical compound and alkaloid. It is the parent structure of the substituted β-carbolines, a large group of alkaloids and synthetic compounds. β-Carboline may be thought of as a cyclized tryptamine. The compound has been found to possess a variety of pharmacological activities, including DNA mutagenic effects, imidazoline receptor interactions, serotonin reuptake inhibition, monoamine oxidase inhibition, cytochrome P450 enzyme inhibition, and inhibition of other enzymes, among others.

β-Carboline is a weak reversible inhibitor of monoamine oxidase A (RIMA), with an IC_{50} of 1,700 nM. It is also a weak dopamine reuptake inhibitor (DRI), with an IC_{50} of 3,040 nM at the dopamine transporter (DAT). The drug shows weak affinity for the serotonin 5-HT_{2B} and 5-HT_{2C} receptors (K_{i} = 738 nM and 2,522 nM, respectively), but not for the serotonin 5-HT_{2A} receptor (K_{i} = >10,000 nM).

== See also ==
- Substituted β-carboline
- Tryptoline
- γ-Carboline
