= Tetrahydroharmine =

Chemical compound

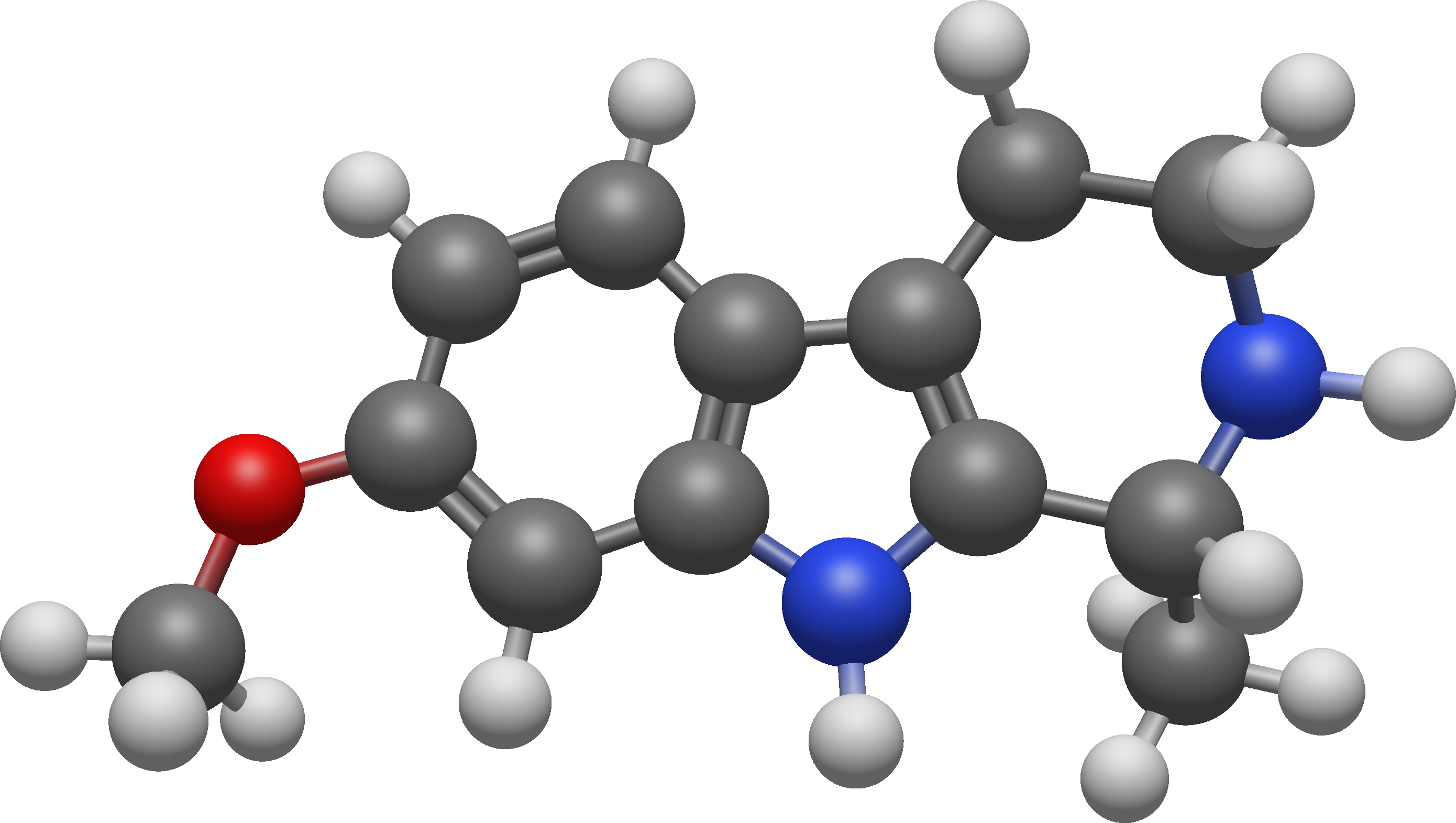

Clinical data
- Other names: THH; 1,2,3,4-Tetrahydroharmine; Leptaflorine; 7-Methoxy-1,2,3,4-tetrahydroharman; 7-Methoxy-1-methyl-1,2,3,4-tetrahydro-β-carboline; 7-MeO-THH
- Routes of administration: Oral
- Drug class: Hallucinogen; Oneirogen
- ATC code: None

Legal status
- Legal status: AU: S9 (Prohibited substance)

Pharmacokinetic data
- Elimination half-life: 4.7–8.8 hours
- Duration of action: Unknown

Identifiers
- IUPAC name: 7-methoxy-1-methyl-2,3,4,9-tetrahydro-1H-pyrido[3,4-b]indole
- CAS Number: 17019-01-1
- PubChem CID: 159809
- ChemSpider: 140510
- UNII: F1Q1E0G45A
- KEGG: C09243
- ChEBI: CHEBI:311931
- ChEMBL: ChEMBL129208
- CompTox Dashboard (EPA): DTXSID70901873

Chemical and physical data
- Formula: C_{13}H_{16}N_{2}O
- Molar mass: 216.284 g·mol^{−1}
- 3D model (JSmol): Interactive image
- SMILES: CC1C2=C(CCN1)C3=C(N2)C=C(C=C3)OC
- InChI: InChI=1S/C13H16N2O/c1-8-13-11(5-6-14-8)10-4-3-9(16-2)7-12(10)15-13/h3-4,7-8,14-15H,5-6H2,1-2H3; Key:ZXLDQJLIBNPEFJ-UHFFFAOYSA-N

Tetrahydroharmine (THH), also known as 7-methoxy-1,2,3,4-tetrahydroharman (7-MeO-THH), is a fluorescent indole alkaloid and β-carboline that occurs in the tropical liana species Banisteriopsis caapi. It is an oneirogenic hallucinogen similarly to harmaline. Conversely however, in contrast to other harmala alkaloids, it is very weak as a monoamine oxidase inhibitor (MAOI).

== Use and effects ==
THH has been reported to produce psychoactive effects similar to those of harmaline in humans. It has been reported to be about one-third as potent as harmaline at a dose of 300 mg orally. THH is believed to be one of the constituents of Banisteriopsis caapi responsible for the hallucinogenic effects of the plant. The duration of THH is unknown.

== Pharmacology ==
=== Pharmacodynamics ===
THH, like other harmala alkaloids in B. caapi, namely harmaline and harmine, is a reversible inhibitor of monoamine oxidase A (RIMA), but it also inhibits the reuptake of serotonin. THH contributes to B. caapi's psychoactivity as a serotonin reuptake inhibitor. Although THH is a RIMA, it is 200-fold less potent than harmine and harmaline in this regard and hence is very weak (IC_{50} = 14,000 nM vs. 60–80 nM, respectively). In addition, its serotonin reuptake inhibition is very weak as well (IC_{50} = 3,400 nM).

In contrast to other β-carbolines, THH shows minimal affinity for the serotonin 5-HT_{2A} receptor (K_{i} = >10,000 nM for racemic THH and R(+)-THH, K_{i} = 5,890 nM for S(–)-THH). Similarly, THH shows negligible affinity for the serotonin 5-HT_{1A} and 5-HT_{2C} receptors and the dopamine D_{2} receptor. THH is inactive as an agonist of the serotonin 5-HT_{2A} receptor, but has been found to be a very weak antagonist of the receptor (IC_{50} = 48,000 nM). It is the first and only harmala alkaloid known to show any functional activity (agonist or antagonist) at the serotonin 5-HT_{2A} receptor.

=== Pharmacokinetics ===
The elimination half-life of THH is 4.7 to 8.8 hours.

== Chemistry ==
=== Synthesis ===
The chemical synthesis of THH has been described.

=== Analogues ===
Analogues of THH include harmine, harmaline, and 6-MeO-THH, among others.

== History ==
THH was first described in the scientific literature by Otto Fischer by 1889. Its hallucinogenic effects were described by Claudio Naranjo in 1967. Subsequently, its hallucinogenic effects were further described by Alexander Shulgin in his book TiHKAL (Tryptamines I Have Known and Loved) in 1997.

== Society and culture ==
=== Legal status ===
==== Australia ====
Harmala alkaloids are considered Schedule 9 prohibited substances under the Poisons Standard (October 2015). A Schedule 9 substance is a substance which may be abused or misused, the manufacture, possession, sale or use of which should be prohibited by law except when required for medical or scientific research, or for analytical, teaching or training purposes with approval of Commonwealth and/or State or Territory Health Authorities.

==== Canada ====
THH is not a controlled substance in Canada as of 2025.

== See also ==
- Substituted β-carboline
- Harmala alkaloid
- Ayahuasca
