= Harmane =

Chemical compound

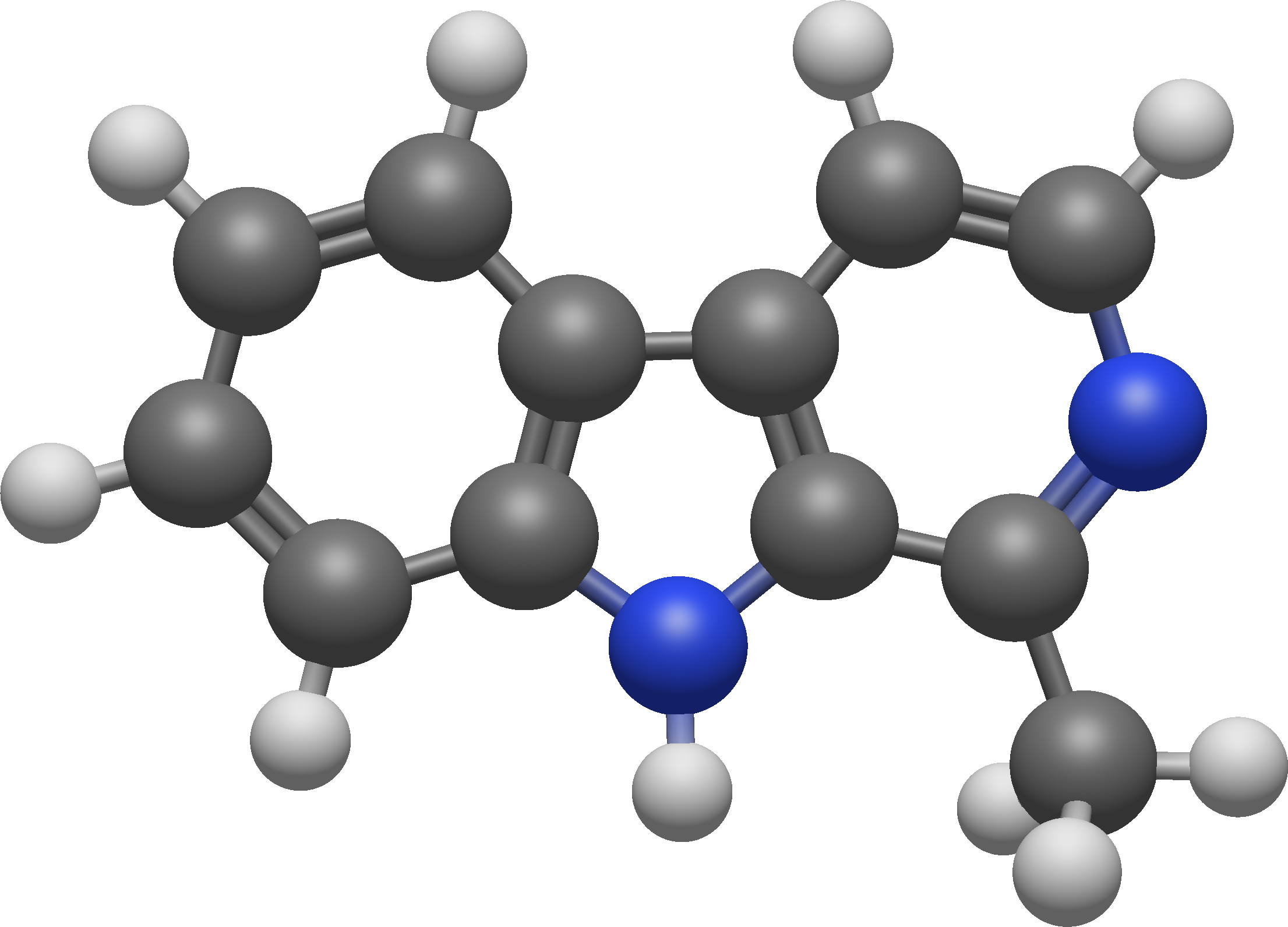

Names
- Preferred IUPAC name 1-Methyl-9H-pyrido[3,4-b]indole
- Other names Harman, 1-Methyl-β-carboline, Aribine, Aribin, Locuturine, Locuturin, Loturine, Passiflorin, 1-Methylnorharman, NSC 54439

Identifiers
CAS Number	486-84-0
3D model (JSmol)	Interactive image
ChEBI	CHEBI:5623
ChemSpider	4444755
ECHA InfoCard	100.006.948
EC Number	207-642-2
KEGG	C09209
PubChem CID	5281404
UNII	82D6J0535P
CompTox Dashboard (EPA)	DTXSID80197568
- InChI: InChI=1S/C12H10N2/c1-8-12-10(6-7-13-8)9-4-2-3-5-11(9)14-12/h2-7,14H,1H3 Key: PSFDQSOCUJVVGF-UHFFFAOYSA-N; InChI=1/C12H10N2/c1-8-12-10(6-7-13-8)9-4-2-3-5-11(9)14-12/h2-7,14H,1H3 Key: PSFDQSOCUJVVGF-UHFFFAOYAA
- SMILES: CC1=NC=CC2=C1NC3=CC=CC=C23

Properties
Chemical formula	C_{12}H_{10}N_{2}
Molar mass	182.226 g·mol^{−1}
Melting point	235–238 °C (455–460 °F; 508–511 K)
Solubility in water	Soluble to 10 mM in 1 eq. HCl methanol: soluble 50 mg/ml
- Except where otherwise noted, data are given for materials in their standard state (at 25 °C [77 °F], 100 kPa). Infobox references

Harmane, or harman, also known as 1-methyl-β-carboline, is a heterocyclic amine and β-carboline found in a variety of foods including coffee, sauces, and cooked meat. It is also present in tobacco smoke.

Harmane is related to other alkaloids, harmine and harmaline, found in 1837 in the plant Peganum harmala. The name derives from the Arabic word for the plant, حَرْمَل (ḥarmal).

In humans, harmane is a potent tremor-producing neurotoxin. Harmane has been found to inhibit the early stages of the growth of the malaria parasite in the gut of mosquitoes infected by the bacterium Delftia tsuruhatensis, and can be absorbed by the mosquitoes upon contact.

== Pharmacology ==
=== Pharmacodynamics ===
Harmane is a potent reversible inhibitor of monoamine oxidase A (RIMA), with an IC_{50} of 60 nM. It is also a weak dopamine reuptake inhibitor (DRI), with an IC_{50} of 1,490 nM at the dopamine transporter (DAT).

Harmane shows weak affinity for the serotonin 5-HT_{2B} and 5-HT_{2C} receptors (K_{i} = 267 nM and 1,135 nM, respectively), but not for the serotonin 5-HT_{2A} receptor (K_{i} = >10,000 nM). It has been found to be inactive as an agonist of the serotonin 5-HT_{2A} receptor.

Harmane fails to substitute for the psychedelic drug DOM in rodent drug discrimination tests. This is similar to the case of harmine but is in contrast to harmaline and 6-methoxyharmalan.

== Chemistry ==
Harmane is a methylated derivative of β-carboline with the molecular formula C_{12}H_{10}N_{2}.

== Natural occurrence ==
Plant sources
Family	Plant
Rubiaceae	Coffea arabica
Solanaceae	Nicotiana tabacum
Theaceae	Camellia sinensis

In 1962, Poindexter et al. found that there was very little harmane in tobacco, but a significant amount in tobacco smoke. They showed that it is produced from tryptophan by the heat of burning the tobacco.

== Society and culture ==
=== Legal status ===
==== Canada ====
Harmane is not a controlled substance in Canada as of 2025.

== See also ==
- Substituted β-carboline
- Harmine
