= Acetryptine =

Drug

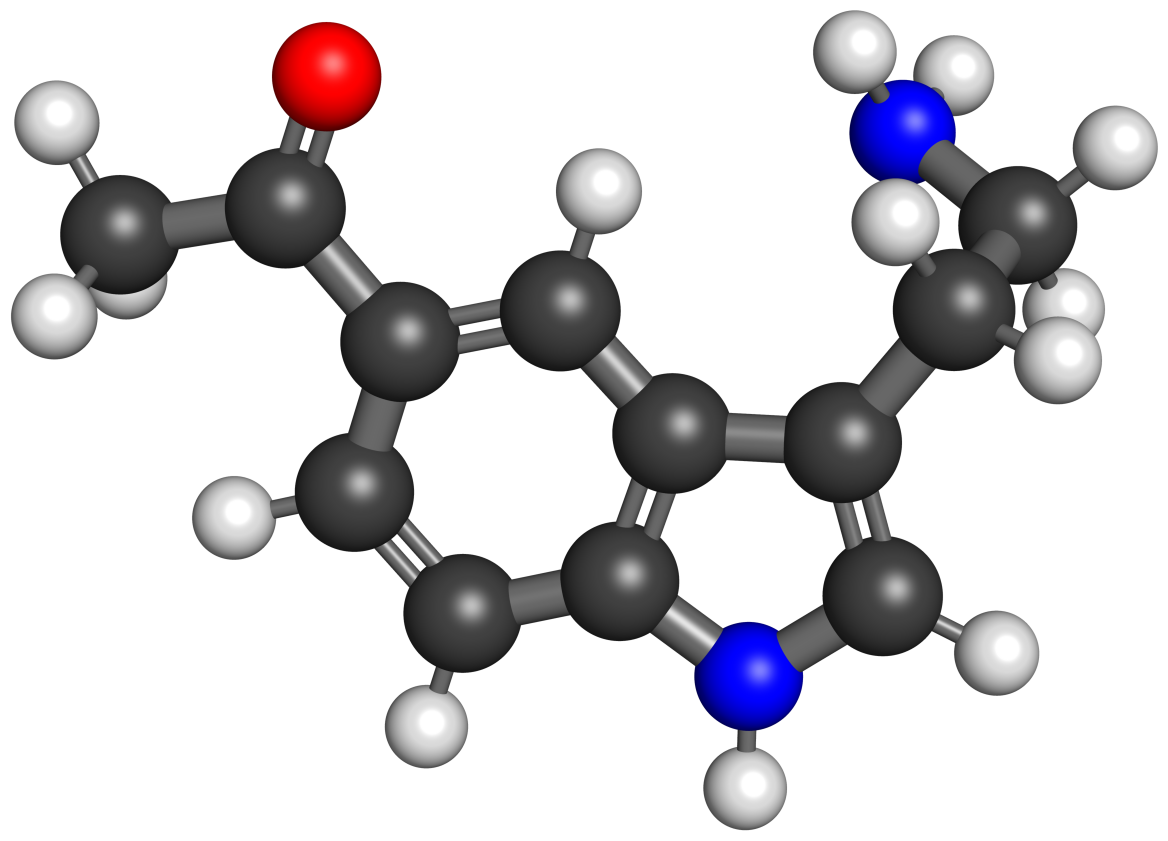

Clinical data
- Other names: W-2965-A; 5-Acetyltryptamine; 5-Acetyl-3-(2-aminoethyl)indole;

Identifiers
- IUPAC name: 1-[3-(2-Aminoethyl)-1H-indol-5-yl]ethanone
- CAS Number: 3551-18-6
- PubChem CID: 20810
- ChemSpider: 19586
- UNII: N9VWZ34G5E
- ChEMBL: ChEMBL110317
- CompTox Dashboard (EPA): DTXSID90189015

Chemical and physical data
- Formula: C_{12}H_{14}N_{2}O
- Molar mass: 202.257 g·mol^{−1}
- 3D model (JSmol): Interactive image
- SMILES: CC(=O)C1=CC2=C(C=C1)NC=C2CCN
- InChI: InChI=1S/C12H14N2O/c1-8(15)9-2-3-12-11(6-9)10(4-5-13)7-14-12/h2-3,6-7,14H,4-5,13H2,1H3; Key:RAUGYAOLAMRLLZ-UHFFFAOYSA-N

Acetryptine (INN; developmental code W-2965-A; also known as 5-acetyltryptamine or 5-AT) is a drug described as an antihypertensive agent which was never marketed. Structurally, acetryptine is a substituted tryptamine, and is closely related to other substituted tryptamines like serotonin (5-hydroxytryptamine). It was developed in the early 1960s. The binding of acetryptine to serotonin receptors does not seem to have been well-investigated, although it was assessed at the 5-HT_{1A} and 5-HT_{1D} receptors and found to bind to them with high affinity. The drug may also act as a monoamine oxidase inhibitor (MAOI); specifically, as an inhibitor of MAO-A.

== See also ==
- 5-Benzyloxytryptamine
- 5-Carboxamidotryptamine
- 5-Ethoxy-DMT
- 5-Methoxytryptamine
- 5-Methyltryptamine
- 5-(Nonyloxy)tryptamine
- Azepindole
- Indorenate
- Metralindole
- Pargyline
- Pirlindole
- Sumatriptan
- Tetrindole
