= 5-Allyloxy-AMT =

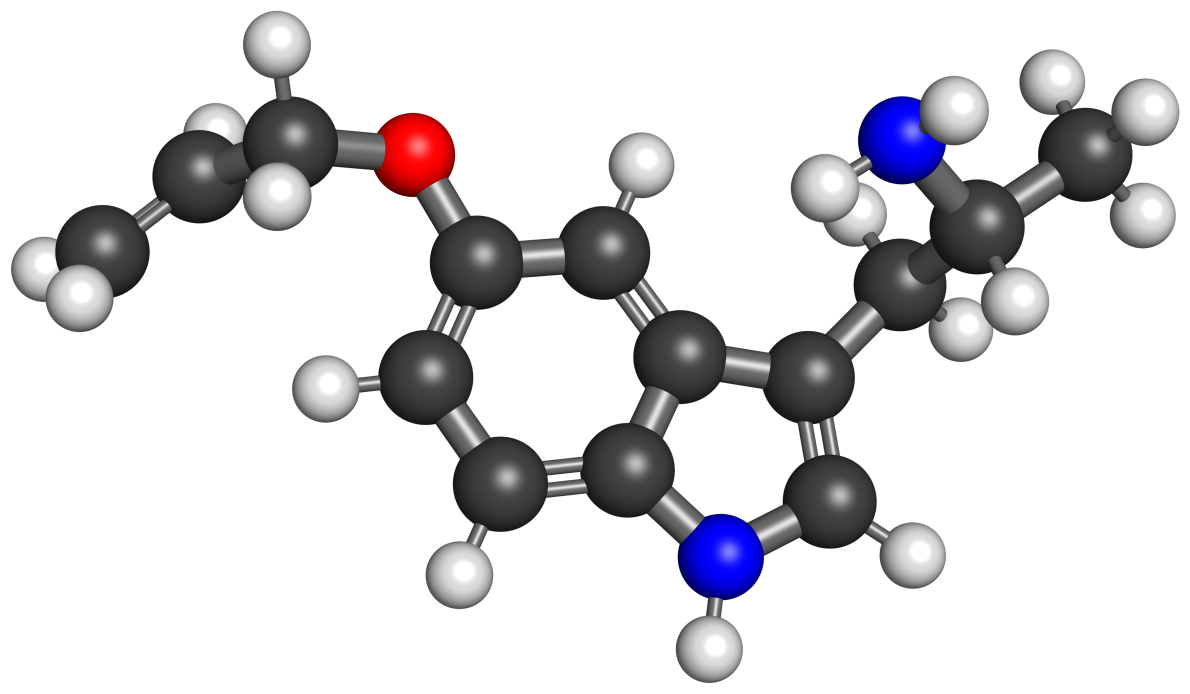

Clinical data
- Other names: 5-Allyloxy-αMT; 5-AlO-AMT; 5-AlO-αMT; 5-Allyloxy-α-methyltryptamine; 2-(5-Allyloxy-1H-indol-3-yl)-1-methylethylamine; Compound 122
- Drug class: Serotonin 5-HT_{2} receptor agonist

Identifiers
- IUPAC name: 1-{5-[(prop-2-en-1-yl)oxy]-1H-indol-3-yl}propan-2-amine

Chemical and physical data
- Formula: C_{14}H_{18}N_{2}O
- Molar mass: 230.311 g·mol^{−1}
- 3D model (JSmol): Interactive image
- SMILES: C=CCOc1ccc2c(c1)c(c[nH]2)CC(N)C
- InChI: InChI=1S/C14H18N2O/c1-3-6-17-12-4-5-14-13(8-12)11(9-16-14)7-10(2)15/h3-5,8-10,16H,1,6-7,15H2,2H3; Key:KHCKGFUWTBZCNH-UHFFFAOYSA-N

5-Allyloxy-AMT, also known as 5-allyloxy-α-methyltryptamine, is a serotonin 5-HT_{2} receptor agonist of the tryptamine, 5-alkyloxytryptamine, and α-alkyltryptamine families.

It is known to act as high-efficacy partial agonist or near-full agonist of the serotonin 5-HT_{2A} receptor (EC_{50} = 162 nM; E_{max} = 89%) and of the serotonin 5-HT_{2B} receptor (EC_{50} = 60 nM; E_{max} = 82%), whereas activity at the serotonin 5-HT_{2C} receptor and other serotonin receptors was not reported.

5-Allyloxy-AMT was the most potent serotonin 5-HT_{2A} receptor agonist reported in a large series of tryptamines that was evaluated in search of potent and selective serotonin 5-HT_{2B} receptor agonists. The only exceptions were the reference serotonin 5-HT_{2A} receptor agonists serotonin (5-HO-T) (EC_{50} = 79 nM; E_{max} = 100%) and (S)-α-methylserotonin ((S)-αMS) (EC_{50} = 54 nM; E_{max} = 103%).

== See also ==
- Substituted tryptamine
- 5-Ethoxy-AMT
- 5-Ethoxy-DMT
- 5-Methoxy-AMT
- 5-(Nonyloxy)tryptamine
- 5-Benzyloxytryptamine
- BW-723C86
