= 5-Ethyl-DMT =

Chemical compound

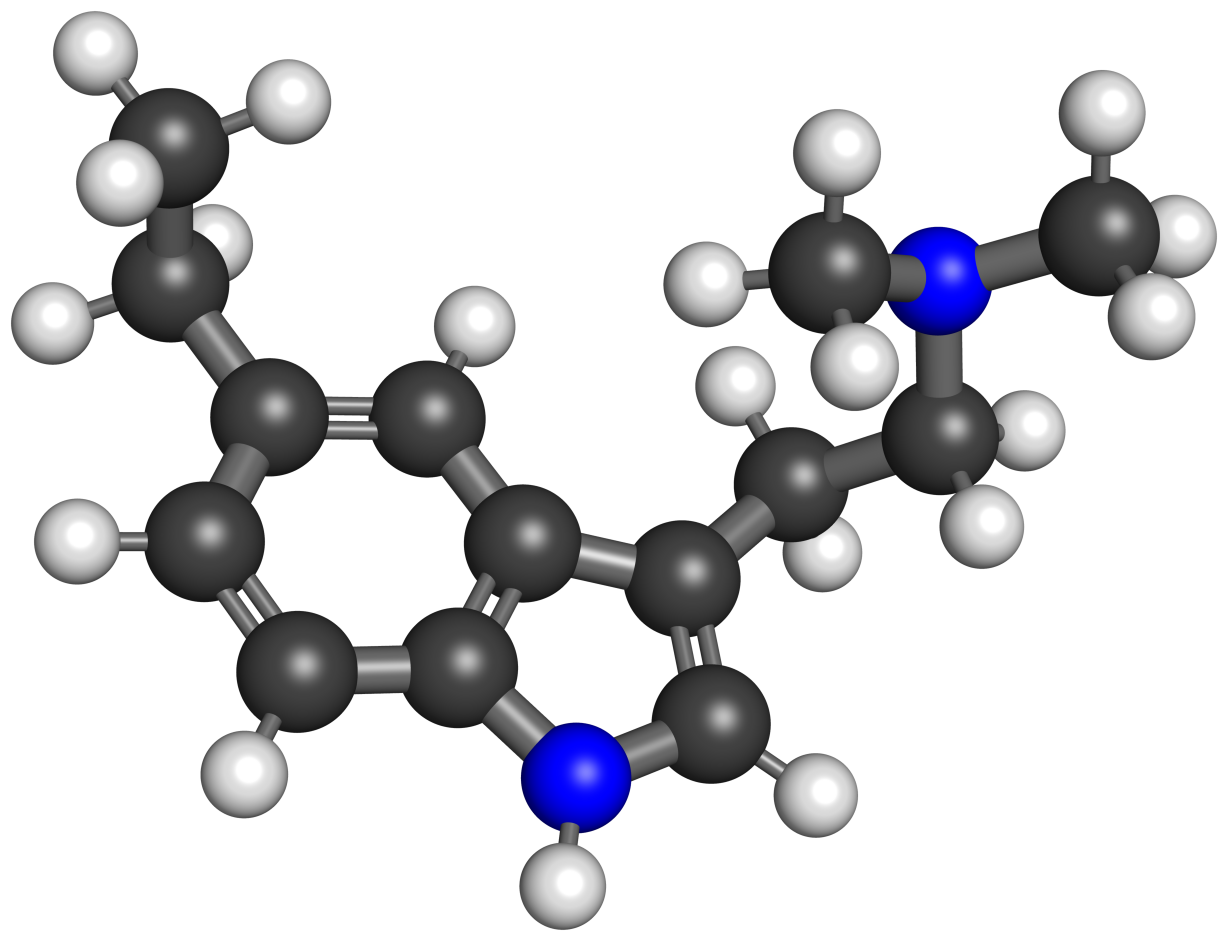

Identifiers
- IUPAC name: 2-(5-Ethyl-1H-indol-3-yl)-N,N-dimethylethanamine
- CAS Number: 171783-25-8
- PubChem CID: 10775128
- ChemSpider: 8950441
- ChEMBL: ChEMBL50492
- CompTox Dashboard (EPA): DTXSID30444736

Chemical and physical data
- Formula: C_{14}H_{20}N_{2}
- Molar mass: 216.328 g·mol^{−1}
- 3D model (JSmol): Interactive image
- SMILES: CN(C)CCc1c[nH]c(ccc2CC)c1c2
- InChI: InChI=1S/C14H20N2/c1-4-11-5-6-14-13(9-11)12(10-15-14)7-8-16(2)3/h5-6,9-10,15H,4,7-8H2,1-3H3; Key:ZEHXYLDGQMEYAX-UHFFFAOYSA-N

5-Ethyl-N,N-dimethyltryptamine is a tryptamine derivative which acts as an agonist at the 5-HT_{1A} and 5-HT_{1D} serotonin receptors, with around 3x selectivity for 5-HT_{1D}.

== See also ==
- 5-Benzyloxytryptamine
- 5-Carboxamidotryptamine
- 5-Ethoxy-DMT
- 5-Methyl-DMT
- Sumatriptan
