= C15H10N4O =

The molecular formula C_{15}H_{10}N_{4}O may refer to:

- CGS-13767
- NU-1223
