= 1-(2,4,5-Trimethoxyphenyl)-6-chlorotryptoline =

Clinical data
- Other names: "Compound 106"; 6-Chloro-1-(2,4,5-trimethoxyphenyl)-2,3,4,9-tetrahydro-1H-β-carboline; 1-(2,4,5-OMePh)-6-Cl-THβC
- Drug class: Serotonin receptor modulator; Serotonin 5-HT_{2} receptor agonist; Serotonin 5-HT_{2A} receptor agonist; Serotonin 5-HT_{2C} receptor agonist
- ATC code: None

Identifiers
- IUPAC name: 6-chloro-1-(2,4,5-trimethoxyphenyl)-2,3,4,9-tetrahydro-1H-pyrido[3,4-b]indole
- CAS Number: 528525-37-3
- PubChem CID: 4376990
- ChemSpider: 3579186
- ChEMBL: ChEMBL5207529

Chemical and physical data
- Formula: C_{20}H_{21}ClN_{2}O_{3}
- Molar mass: 372.85 g·mol^{−1}
- 3D model (JSmol): Interactive image
- SMILES: COC1=CC(=C(C=C1C2C3=C(CCN2)C4=C(N3)C=CC(=C4)Cl)OC)OC
- InChI: InChI=1S/C20H21ClN2O3/c1-24-16-10-18(26-3)17(25-2)9-14(16)19-20-12(6-7-22-19)13-8-11(21)4-5-15(13)23-20/h4-5,8-10,19,22-23H,6-7H2,1-3H3; Key:RJHMAXLLXKUOBW-UHFFFAOYSA-N

1-(2,4,5-Trimethoxyphenyl)-6-chlorotryptoline, also known as 6-chloro-1-(2,4,5-trimethoxyphenyl)-2,3,4,9-tetrahydro-1H-β-carboline, is a serotonin receptor modulator of the β-carboline family. It is a ring-substituted derivative of the β-carboline tryptoline (THβC) and a simplified analogue of the heteroyohimbine alkaloid alstonine.

== Pharmacology ==
=== Pharmacodynamics ===
1-(2,4,5-Trimethoxyphenyl)-6-chlorotryptoline acts as a highly potent full agonist of the serotonin 5-HT_{2A}, 5-HT_{2B}, and 5-HT_{2C} receptors. Its EC_{50} (E_{max}) values were 1.7 nM (98.4%) at the serotonin 5-HT_{2A} receptor, 0.50 nM (97.5%) at the serotonin 5-HT_{2B} receptor, and 0.58 nM (96.7%) at the serotonin 5-HT_{2C} receptor. The drug was one of the most potent serotonin 5-HT_{2A} receptor agonists of a large series of assessed tryptoline derivatives.

1-(2,4,5-Trimethoxyphenyl)-6-chlorotryptoline's potent serotonin 5-HT_{2} receptor agonism is in notable contrast to other simpler β-carbolines like harmine and harmaline, which have been found to be inactive as serotonin 5-HT_{2A} receptor agonists even at very high concentrations. Similarly, tryptoline itself shows very low affinity for serotonin 5-HT_{2} receptors.

In addition to the serotonin 5-HT_{2} receptors, 1-(2,4,5-trimethoxyphenyl)-6-chlorotryptoline shows variable but mostly high affinity for most other serotonin receptors (K_{i} = 2.50–1,493 nM). Interactions at other receptors have also been reported.

== Chemistry ==
=== Synthesis ===
The chemical synthesis of 1-(2,4,5-trimethoxyphenyl)-6-chlorotryptoline has been described.

=== Analogues ===
A large number of analogues of 1-(2,4,5-trimethoxyphenyl)-6-chlorotryptoline have been described.

== History ==
1-(2,4,5-Trimethoxyphenyl)-6-chlorotryptoline was first described in the scientific literature by Meghan J. Orr and colleagues in 2022.

== See also ==
- Substituted β-carboline
- List of miscellaneous serotonin 5-HT_{2A} receptor agonists
- 1-Ethyl-6-hydroxytryptoline
- Pinoline
- NU-1223
- LY-266,097
- LY-272,015
- Fenharmane
