= C18H22N4O2 =

The molecular formula C_{18}H_{22}N_{4}O_{2} (molar mass: 326.17 g/mol, exact mass: 326.1743 u) may refer to:

- EGIS-7625
- Peficitinib (Smyraf)
