= C15H14N4O =

The molecular formula C_{15}H_{14}N_{4}O (molar mass: 266.30 g/mol, exact mass: 266.1168 u) may refer to:

- Nevirapine (NVP)
- SB-200646
