= C13H16N2O3 =

The molecular formula C_{13}H_{16}N_{2}O_{3} (molar mass: 248.28 g/mol, exact mass: 248.1161 u) may refer to:

- 6-Hydroxymelatonin (6-OHM)
- Indorenate
