= NU-1223 =

Identifiers
- IUPAC name: 1-pyrimidin-5-yl-9H-pyrido[3,4-b]indol-6-ol
- CAS Number: 2415092-49-6
- PubChem CID: 146464666

Chemical and physical data
- Formula: C_{15}H_{10}N_{4}O
- Molar mass: 262.272 g·mol^{−1}
- 3D model (JSmol): Interactive image
- SMILES: C1=CC2=C(C=C1O)C3=C(N2)C(=NC=C3)C4=CN=CN=C4
- InChI: InChI=1S/C15H10N4O/c20-10-1-2-13-12(5-10)11-3-4-18-14(15(11)19-13)9-6-16-8-17-7-9/h1-8,19-20H; Key:QIMOFNWSIPJEKQ-UHFFFAOYSA-N

NU-1223 is an experimental drug from the β-carboline family, which is thought to act as a selective agonist of the 5-HT_{2C} receptor. It has been investigated for possible applications in the treatment of schizophrenia.

== See also ==
- Substituted β-carboline
- Alstonine
- Harmine
- LY-266,097
- LY-272,015
- Fenharmane
- 1-(2,4,5-Trimethoxyphenyl)-6-chlorotryptoline
