= 5-Ethoxy-DMT =

Chemical compound

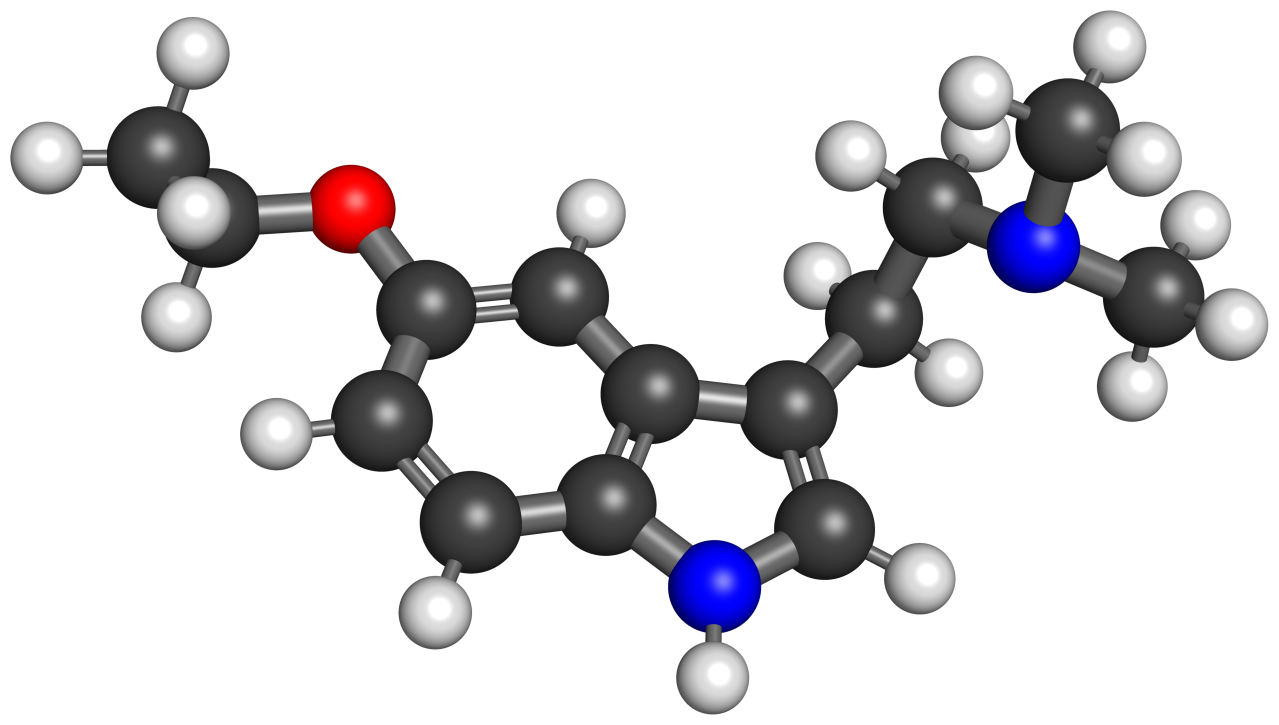

Clinical data
- Other names: 5-EtO-DMT; 5-Ethoxy-N,N-dimethyltryptamine; O-Ethylbufotenine; O-Ethylbufotenin

Identifiers
- IUPAC name: 2-(5-ethoxy-1H-indol-3-yl)-N,N-dimethylethanamine
- CAS Number: 855245-09-9
- PubChem CID: 57468316
- ChemSpider: 26286732
- UNII: RXJ4TM3EX4
- CompTox Dashboard (EPA): DTXSID70726745

Chemical and physical data
- Formula: C_{14}H_{20}N_{2}O
- Molar mass: 232.327 g·mol^{−1}
- 3D model (JSmol): Interactive image
- SMILES: CCOc(cc12)ccc1[nH]cc2CCN(C)C
- InChI: InChI=1S/C14H20N2O/c1-4-17-12-5-6-14-13(9-12)11(10-15-14)7-8-16(2)3/h5-6,9-10,15H,4,7-8H2,1-3H3; Key:OSUDCFCSUHGWJF-UHFFFAOYSA-N

5-Ethoxy-DMT, or 5-EtO-DMT, also known as 5-ethoxy-N,N-dimethyltryptamine or as O-ethylbufotenine, is a tryptamine derivative which has been previously synthesized as a chemical intermediate, but has not been studied to determine its pharmacology.

== Chemistry ==
=== Analogues ===
Analogues of 5-EtO-DMT include bufotenin (5-HO-DMT), 5-MeO-DMT (mebufotenin), 5-EtO-AMT, 5-AlO-AMT, 5-ethyl-DMT, 5-NOT, 5-BT, and 4-AcO-DMT (O-acetylbufotenin), among others.

The widespread recreational use of 5-methoxytryptamines including 5-MeO-DMT, 5-MeO-MiPT and 5-MeO-DiPT has led to concern that the 5-ethoxy homologues of these drugs could emerge as novel designer drugs. Consequently, 5-EtO-DMT and other derivatives, including 5-EtO-DET, 5-EtO-DPT, 5-EtO-DiPT, 5-EtO-DALT, 5-EtO-MPT, 5-EtO-MiPT, 5-EtO-EiPT, 5-EtO-MET, and 5-EtO-EPT, have been synthesized as analytical standards in order to facilitate future research into these compounds.

== See also ==
- Substituted tryptamine
