= 5,N,N-TMT =

Chemical compound

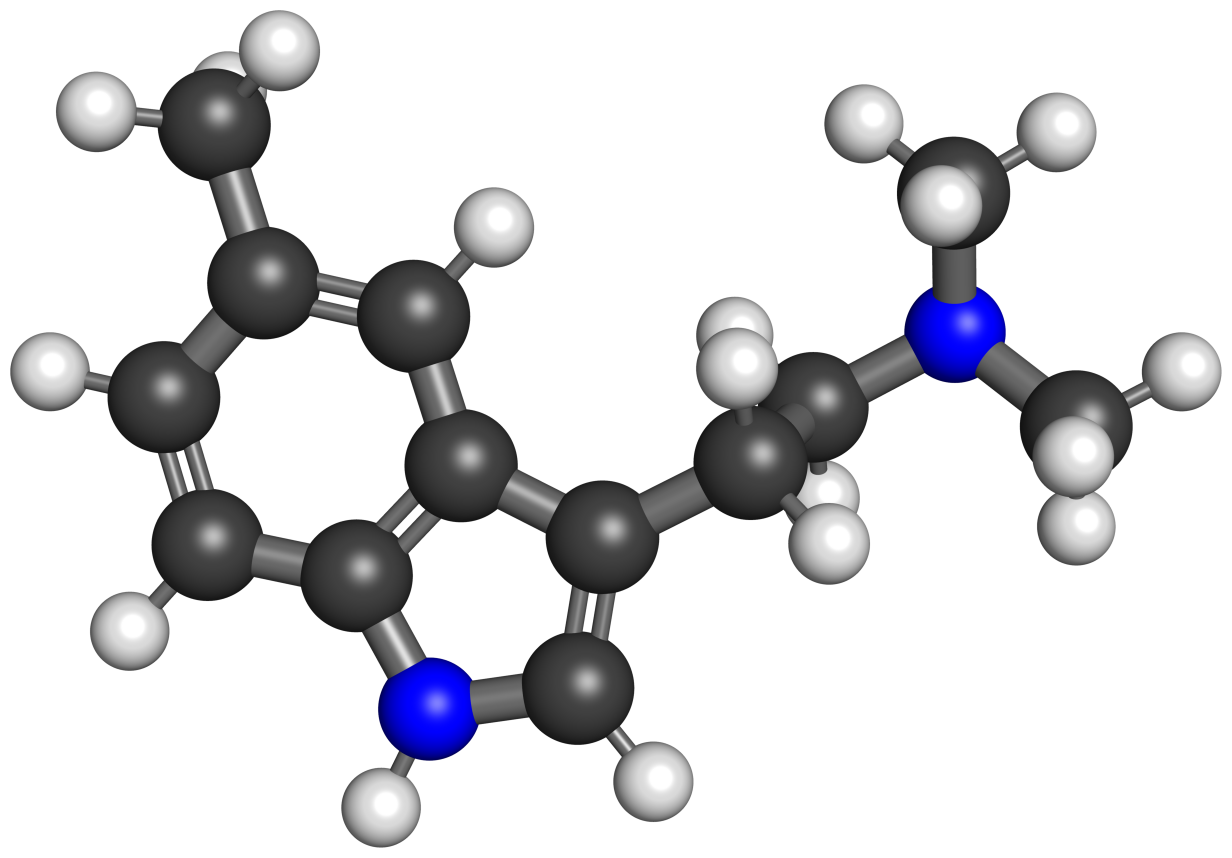

Clinical data
- Other names: 5,N,N-Trimethyltryptamine; 5,N,N-TMT; 5-TMT; 5-Methyl-N,N-dimethyltryptamine; 5-Methyl-DMT; 5-Me-DMT
- ATC code: None

Identifiers
- IUPAC name: (2-(5-methyl-1H-indol-3-yl)-1-methyl-ethyl)dimethylamine
- CAS Number: 22120-39-4
- PubChem CID: 1837
- ChemSpider: 1771
- UNII: HIX0SK1CCX
- CompTox Dashboard (EPA): DTXSID30176641
- ECHA InfoCard: 100.164.424

Chemical and physical data
- Formula: C_{13}H_{18}N_{2}
- Molar mass: 202.301 g·mol^{−1}
- 3D model (JSmol): Interactive image
- SMILES: c1c(ccc2c1c(c[nH]2)CCN(C)C)C
- InChI: InChI=1S/C13H18N2/c1-10-4-5-13-12(8-10)11(9-14-13)6-7-15(2)3/h4-5,8-9,14H,6-7H2,1-3H3; Key:NCGJLYBZSJSCIC-UHFFFAOYSA-N

5,N,N-Trimethyltryptamine (5,N,N-TMT; 5-TMT), also known as 5-methyl-DMT, is a tryptamine derivative that may be a psychedelic drug. It was first made in 1958 by Edwin H. P. Young. In animal experiments it was found to be in between DMT and 5-MeO-DMT in potency.

== Chemistry ==
=== Analogues ===
Analogues of 5,N,N-TMT include dimethyltryptamine (DMT), 5-methyltryptamine, 5-ethyl-DMT, 5-MeO-DMT, 5-fluoro-DMT, 5-chloro-DMT, 5-bromo-DMT, 1-methyl-DMT, 2-methyl-DMT, 4-methyl-DMT, 6-methyl-DMT, and 7-methyl-DMT, among others.

== Society and culture ==
=== Legal status ===
==== United States ====
5,N,N-TMT is not scheduled at the federal level in the United States, but it could be considered an analog of 5-MeO-DMT, in which case, sales or possession intended for human consumption could be prosecuted under the Federal Analog Act.

== See also ==
- Substituted tryptamine
