= 2-Methyl-5-hydroxytryptamine =

Chemical compound

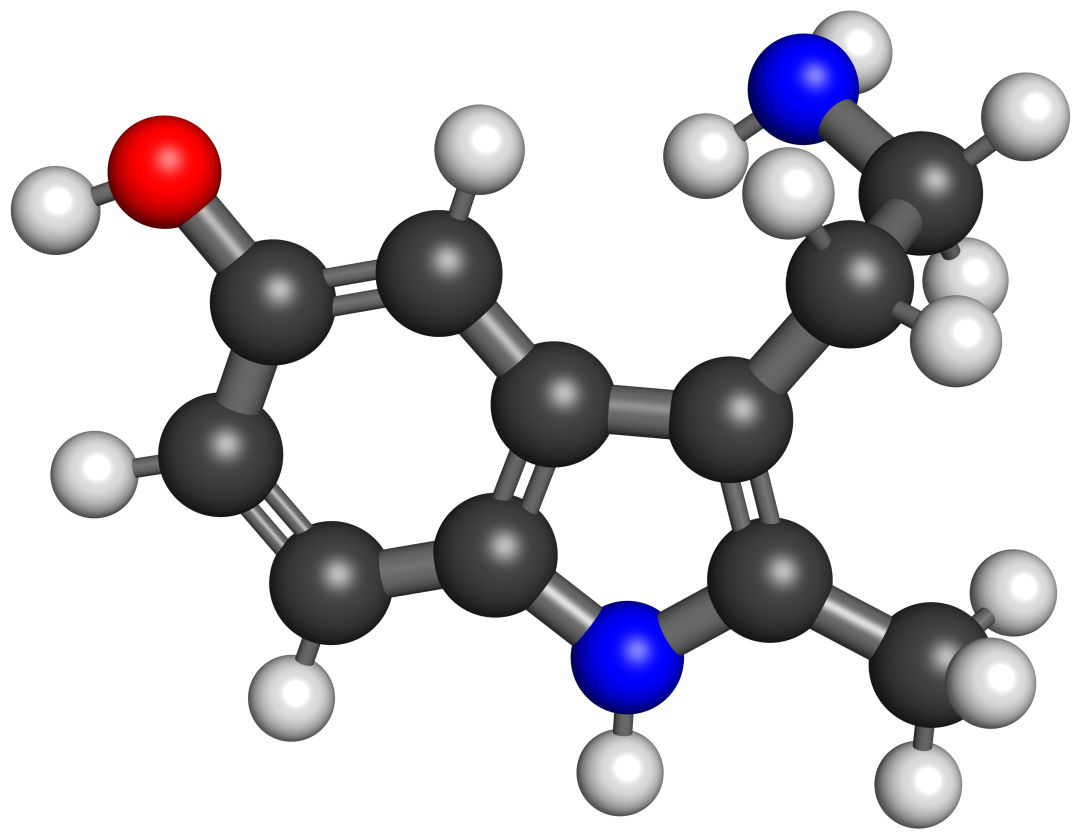

Identifiers
- IUPAC name: 3-(2-aminoethyl)-2-methyl-1H-indol-5-ol
- CAS Number: 78263-90-8
- PubChem CID: 1574
- IUPHAR/BPS: 218
- ChemSpider: 1518
- UNII: D77Z9HJT2U
- KEGG: C13665
- ChEBI: CHEBI:31085
- ChEMBL: ChEMBL266591
- CompTox Dashboard (EPA): DTXSID80228927
- ECHA InfoCard: 100.231.402

Chemical and physical data
- Formula: C_{11}H_{14}N_{2}O
- Molar mass: 190.246 g·mol^{−1}
- 3D model (JSmol): Interactive image
- SMILES: Oc1cc2c(cc1)[nH]c(c2CCN)C
- InChI: InChI=1S/C11H14N2O/c1-7-9(4-5-12)10-6-8(14)2-3-11(10)13-7/h2-3,6,13-14H,4-5,12H2,1H3; Key:WYWNEDARFVJQSG-UHFFFAOYSA-N

2-Methyl-5-hydroxytryptamine (2-methylserotonin, 2-methyl-5-HT) is a tryptamine derivative closely related to the neurotransmitter serotonin which acts as a moderately selective full agonist at the 5-HT_{3} receptor.

== See also ==
- 5-Carboxamidotryptamine
- 5-Methoxytryptamine
- α-Methyl-5-hydroxytryptamine
