= SB-215505 =

Chemical compound

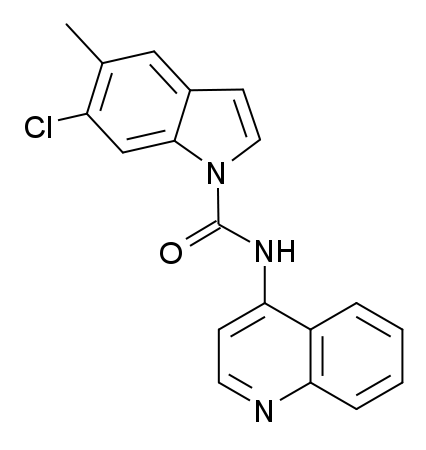

Identifiers
- IUPAC name: 6-chloro-5-methyl-N-quinolin-4-yl-2,3-dihydroindole-1-carboxamide
- CAS Number: 162100-15-4
- PubChem CID: 6603999
- ChemSpider: 5036305
- ChEMBL: ChEMBL525998
- CompTox Dashboard (EPA): DTXSID70424971

Chemical and physical data
- Formula: C_{19}H_{16}ClN_{3}O
- Molar mass: 337.81 g·mol^{−1}
- 3D model (JSmol): Interactive image
- SMILES: CC1=C(C=C2C(=C1)CCN2C(=O)NC3=CC=NC4=CC=CC=C43)Cl
- InChI: InChI=1S/C19H16ClN3O/c1-12-10-13-7-9-23(18(13)11-15(12)20)19(24)22-17-6-8-21-16-5-3-2-4-14(16)17/h2-6,8,10-11H,7,9H2,1H3,(H,21,22,24); Key:BPVGSWDWIRIUME-UHFFFAOYSA-N

SB-215505 is a drug which acts as a potent and selective antagonist at the serotonin 5-HT_{2B} receptor, with good selectivity over the related 5-HT_{2A} and 5-HT_{2C} receptors. It is used in scientific research into the function of the 5-HT_{2} family of receptors, especially to study the role of 5-HT_{2B} receptors in the heart, and to distinguish 5-HT_{2B}-mediated responses from those produced by 5-HT_{2A} or 5-HT_{2C}.
