= BW-723C86 =

Chemical compound

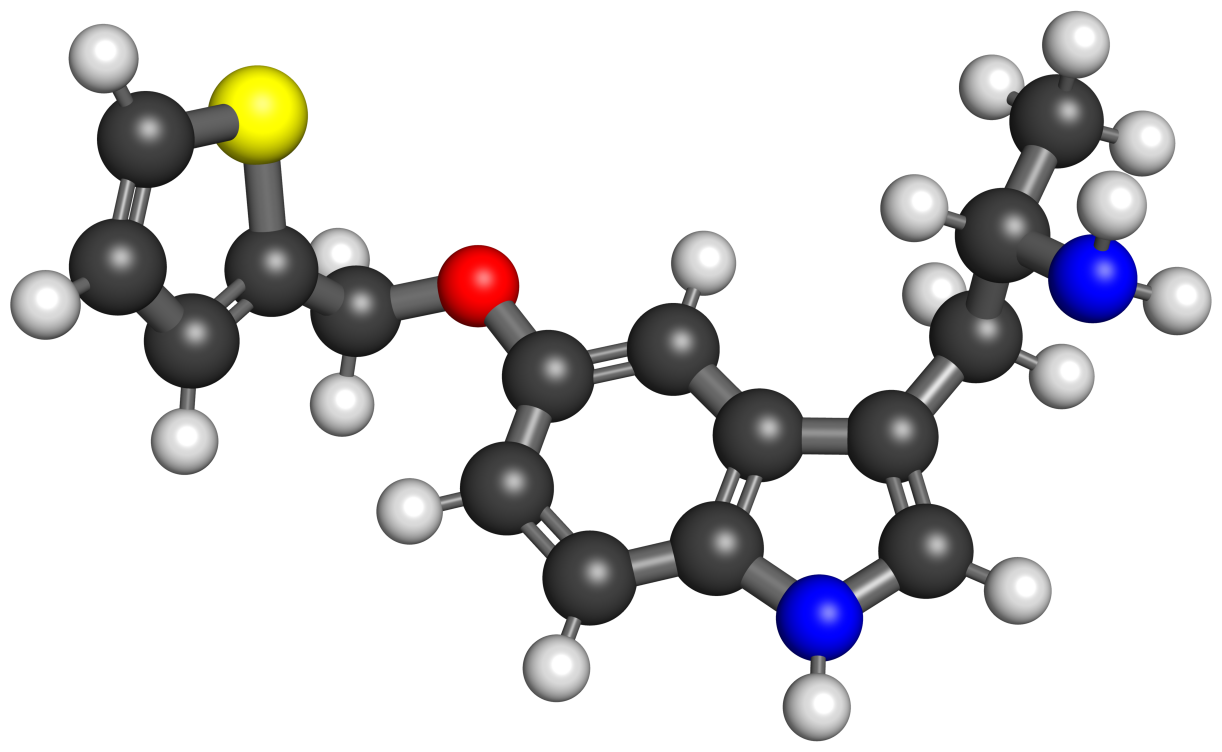

Identifiers
- IUPAC name: 1-[5-(2-Thienylmethoxy)-1H-indol-3-yl]-2-propanamine
- CAS Number: 160521-72-2
- PubChem CID: 4284720
- IUPHAR/BPS: 161
- ChemSpider: 3491208
- UNII: 8JMH6M2ELN
- CompTox Dashboard (EPA): DTXSID001220590 DTXSID90415503, DTXSID001220590

Chemical and physical data
- Formula: C_{16}H_{18}N_{2}OS
- Molar mass: 286.39 g·mol^{−1}
- 3D model (JSmol): Interactive image
- SMILES: c2c1c([nH]cc1CC(C)N)ccc2OCc3cccs3
- InChI: InChI=1S/C16H18N2OS/c1-11(17)7-12-9-18-16-5-4-13(8-15(12)16)19-10-14-3-2-6-20-14/h2-6,8-9,11,18H,7,10,17H2,1H3; Key:ALFGDCNSEBJYSP-UHFFFAOYSA-N

BW-723C86 is a tryptamine derivative drug which acts as a 5-HT_{2B} receptor agonist. It has anxiolytic effects in animal studies, and is also used for investigating the function of the 5-HT_{2B} receptor in a range of other tissues.

BW-723C86 is actually a mixed 5-HT_{2B}/5-HT_{2C} agonist, and while it has good selectivity over 5-HT_{2A} and other serotonin receptor subtypes, it is around only 3 times as selective for 2B compared to 2C and so is much less selective than most research ligands, but no superior 5-HT_{2B} agonist was available until the potent and selective 5-HT_{2B} activity of 6-APB was discovered in 2012. Highly selective 5-HT_{2C} antagonists are available however, and so a combination of BW-723C86 with a selective 5-HT_{2C} antagonist allows 5-HT_{2B} mediated responses to be studied in isolation.

The drug does not induce the head-twitch response, a behavioral proxy of psychedelic effects associated with serotonin 5-HT_{2A} receptor agonism, across a wide range of doses. This may be related to the fact that it showed more than 200-fold selectivity for activation of the serotonin 5-HT_{2B} receptor over the serotonin 5-HT_{2A} receptor.

An in vitro study including assay on normal (healthy) human melanocytes found that BW-723C86 causes skin whitening. The mechanism of action of BW-723C86 is decreasing the expression of MITF which in turn, decreases the expression of the melanin main synthesizing enzymes: tyrosinase, TRP-1 and TRP-2. (Note: "In summary, results of our study indicated that BW723C86 inhibits melanin synthesis by suppressing the expression of melanogenesis-related proteins (tyrosinase, TRP-1, and TRP-2) at the transcriptional level. The decreased expression of these proteins is a result of reduced MITF expression. Furthermore, the reduced level of MITF was associated with inhibition of the PKA/CREB/MITF pathway and direct inhibition of MITF transcription.") BW-723C86 is not cytotoxic to melanocytes and, unlike many skin whitening agents, does not directly inhibit the activity of tyrosinase. (Note: "BW723C86 treatment reduced melanin content in melan-A cells and in normal human melanocytes (NHM) without affecting cellular viability. BW723C86 reduced intracellular tyrosinase activity but did not affect tyrosinase activity in cell extracts, indicating that BW723C86 does not have a direct effect on tyrosinase activity.")

== See also ==
- 5-Benzyloxytryptamine
- 5-Phenoxytryptamine
- VU6067416
- 5-Allyloxy-AMT
