= Medmain =

Clinical data
- Other names: 2-Methyl-3-ethyl-5-dimethylaminoindole
- Drug class: Serotonin receptor modulator; Serotonin antagonist or partial agonist; Convulsant
- ATC code: None

Identifiers
- IUPAC name: 3-ethyl-N,N,2-trimethyl-1H-indol-5-amine
- CAS Number: 576-11-4
- PubChem CID: 246532
- ChemSpider: 215737
- UNII: 4WS3Y1CI1P
- ChEMBL: ChEMBL52909

Chemical and physical data
- Formula: C_{13}H_{18}N_{2}
- Molar mass: 202.301 g·mol^{−1}
- 3D model (JSmol): Interactive image
- SMILES: CCC1=C(NC2=C1C=C(C=C2)N(C)C)C
- InChI: InChI=1S/C13H18N2/c1-5-11-9(2)14-13-7-6-10(15(3)4)8-12(11)13/h6-8,14H,5H2,1-4H3; Key:IOYNGCZNYGEZRO-UHFFFAOYSA-N

Medmain, also known as 2-methyl-3-ethyl-5-dimethylaminoindole, is a serotonin receptor modulator, convulsant, and indole derivative related to the neurotransmitter serotonin. It has low-potency serotonin antagonist or partial agonist activity, with low affinity for serotonin 5-HT_{1} and 5-HT_{2} receptors (IC_{50} = >1,000 nM) but greater activity against the serotonin receptors in the rat stomach fundus strip (K_{B} = 50 nM) (thought to represent the serotonin 5-HT_{2B} receptor). Owing to its convulsant activity, medmain was tested in animals but not in humans. The drug was described and studied by E. Shaw and Dilworth Woolley in the 1950s. A derivative, 1-methylmedmain, is also known, and has similar potency as a serotonin antagonist but lacks the convulsant activity of medmain. Other analogues of medmain have been explored as well, but none had improved activity at the rat fundus strip serotonin 5-HT_{2B} receptor compared to medmain and 1-methylmedmain.
