= MRS7292 =

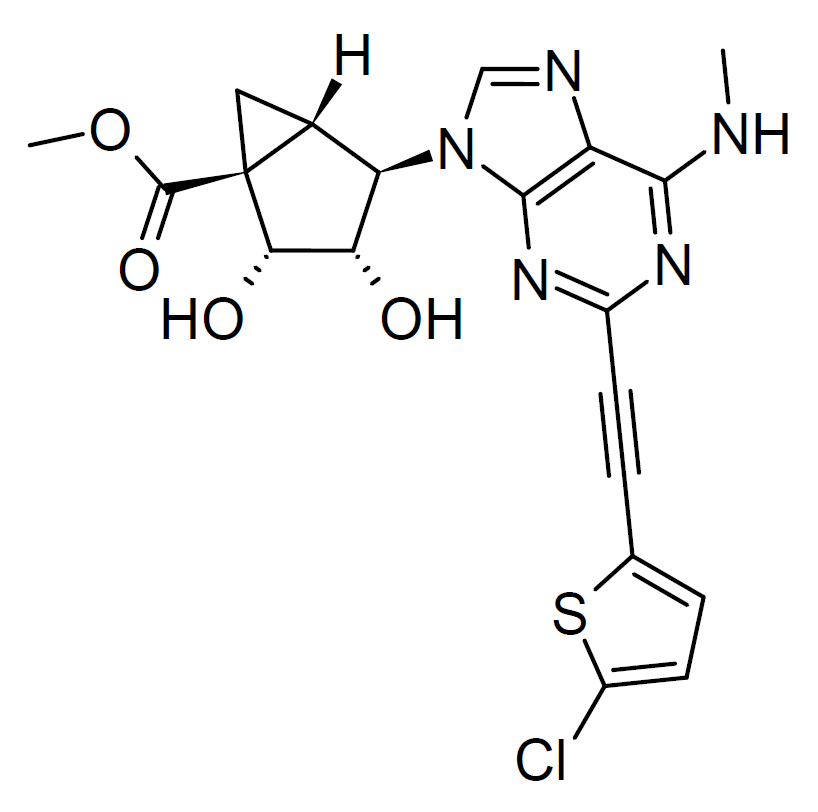

Identifiers
- IUPAC name: methyl (1S,2R,3S,4R,5S)-4-[2-[2-(5-chlorothiophen-2-yl)ethynyl]-6-(methylamino)purin-9-yl]-2,3-dihydroxybicyclo[3.1.0]hexane-1-carboxylate
- CAS Number: 2092913-97-6
- PubChem CID: 137633601
- ChemSpider: 76784456
- ChEMBL: ChEMBL4066973

Chemical and physical data
- Formula: C_{20}H_{18}ClN_{5}O_{4}S
- Molar mass: 459.91 g·mol^{−1}
- 3D model (JSmol): Interactive image
- SMILES: CNC1=C2C(=NC(=N1)C#CC3=CC=C(S3)Cl)N(C=N2)[C@@H]4[C@H]5C[C@]5([C@H]([C@H]4O)O)C(=O)OC
- InChI: InChI=1S/C20H18ClN5O4S/c1-22-17-13-18(25-12(24-17)6-4-9-3-5-11(21)31-9)26(8-23-13)14-10-7-20(10,19(29)30-2)16(28)15(14)27/h3,5,8,10,14-16,27-28H,7H2,1-2H3,(H,22,24,25)/t10-,14-,15+,16+,20+/m1/s1; Key:OXHKHNQYCDYUIU-AQPYCOETSA-N

MRS7292 is an experimental drug that selectively activates the adenosine A3 receptor with moderate affinity and also inhibits a dopamine reuptake. This combination of mechanisms has been observed in the same molecule.

== See also ==
- MRS8209
