= 5-(Nonyloxy)tryptamine =

Chemical compound

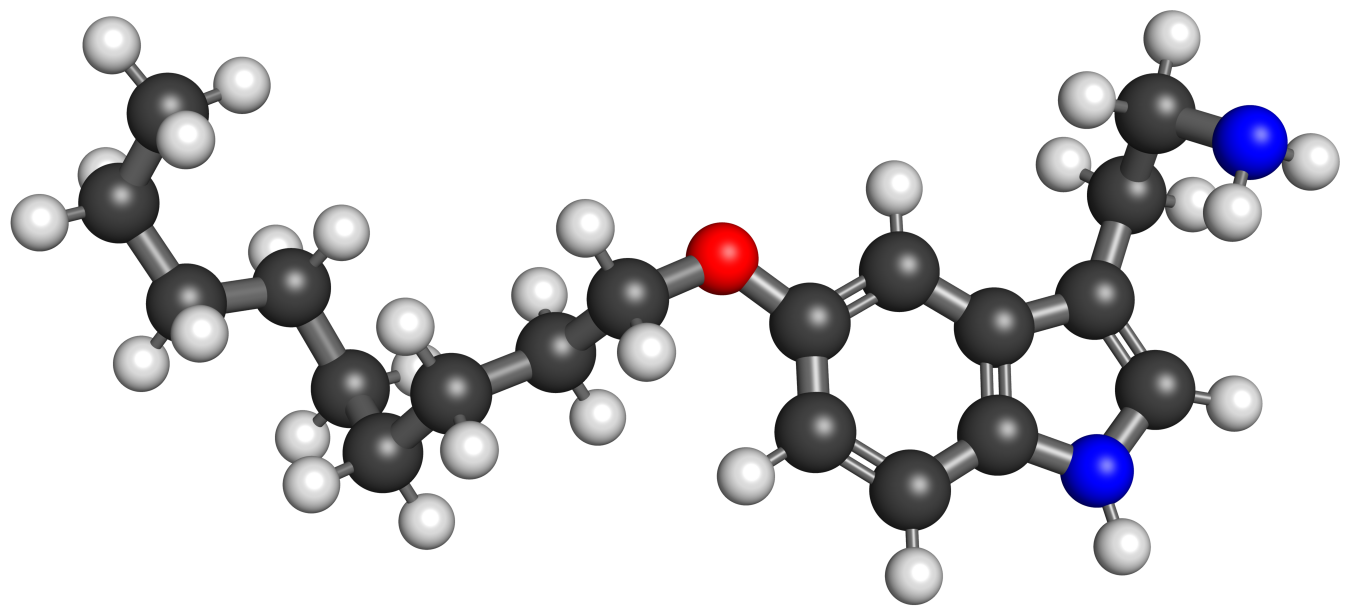

Clinical data
- Other names: 5-NOT; 5-(Nonyloxy)-1H-indole-3-ethanamine

Identifiers
- IUPAC name: 2-(5-Nonyloxy-1H-indol-3-yl)ethanamine
- CAS Number: 157798-12-4
- PubChem CID: 1797
- IUPHAR/BPS: 106
- ChemSpider: 1731
- UNII: TV6CHD9VPT
- ChEBI: CHEBI:64149
- ChEMBL: ChEMBL97450
- CompTox Dashboard (EPA): DTXSID4058653

Chemical and physical data
- Formula: C_{19}H_{30}N_{2}O
- Molar mass: 302.462 g·mol^{−1}
- 3D model (JSmol): Interactive image
- SMILES: CCCCCCCCCOC1=CC2=C(C=C1)NC=C2CCN
- InChI: InChI=1S/C19H30N2O/c1-2-3-4-5-6-7-8-13-22-17-9-10-19-18(14-17)16(11-12-20)15-21-19/h9-10,14-15,21H,2-8,11-13,20H2,1H3; Key:YHSMSRREJYOGQJ-UHFFFAOYSA-N

5-(Nonyloxy)tryptamine (5-NOT) is a tryptamine derivative which acts as a selective agonist at the 5-HT_{1B} receptor. Increasing the O-alkoxy chain length in this series gives generally increasing potency and selectivity for 5-HT_{1B}, with highest activity found for the nonyloxy derivative, having a 5-HT_{1B} binding affinity of 1.0 nM, and around 300-fold selectivity over the related 5-HT_{1A} receptor.

== See also ==
- 5-Allyloxy-AMT
- 5-Benzyloxytryptamine
- 5-Carboxamidotryptamine
- 5-Ethoxy-DMT
- 5-Methyltryptamine
- Sumatriptan
