= 1-Methylmedmain =

Clinical data
- Other names: 1,2-Dimethyl-3-ethyl-5-dimethylaminoindole
- Drug class: Serotonin receptor modulator; Serotonin antagonist or partial agonist
- ATC code: None

Identifiers
- IUPAC name: 3-ethyl-N,N,1,2-tetramethylindol-5-amine
- CAS Number: 28027-41-0
- PubChem CID: 244184
- ChemSpider: 213520
- ChEMBL: ChEMBL298780
- CompTox Dashboard (EPA): DTXSID50288235

Chemical and physical data
- Formula: C_{14}H_{20}N_{2}
- Molar mass: 216.328 g·mol^{−1}
- 3D model (JSmol): Interactive image
- SMILES: CCC1=C(N(C2=C1C=C(C=C2)N(C)C)C)C
- InChI: InChI=1S/C14H20N2/c1-6-12-10(2)16(5)14-8-7-11(15(3)4)9-13(12)14/h7-9H,6H2,1-5H3; Key:MVBMCSOTTKNKHD-UHFFFAOYSA-N

1-Methylmedmain, also known as 1,2-dimethyl-3-ethyl-5-dimethylaminoindole, is a serotonin receptor modulator and indole derivative related to the neurotransmitter serotonin. It is the 1-methyl derivative of medmain. The drug has low-potency serotonin antagonist or partial agonist activity, with low affinity for serotonin 5-HT_{1} and 5-HT_{2} receptors (IC_{50} = >1,000 nM) but greater activity against the serotonin receptors in the rat stomach fundus strip (K_{B} = 48 nM) (thought to represent the serotonin 5-HT_{2B} receptor). It has similar potency as medmain, but lacks medmain's convulsant activity. 1-Methylmedmain was described and studied by E. Shaw and Dilworth Woolley in the 1950s. Other analogues of medmain have also been explored, but none had improved activity at the rat fundus strip serotonin 5-HT_{2B} receptor compared to medmain and 1-methylmedmain.
