= 5-Nitrotryptamine =

Clinical data
- Other names: 5-Nitro-T; Nitro-I; NitroI; 3-(2-Aminoethyl)-5-nitroindole
- Drug class: Serotonin receptor modulator; Serotonin 5-HT_{2A} receptor agonist; Serotonergic psychedelic; Hallucinogen
- ATC code: None

Identifiers
- IUPAC name: 2-(5-nitro-1H-indol-3-yl)ethanamine
- CAS Number: 55747-72-3
- PubChem CID: 151295
- ChemSpider: 133347
- CompTox Dashboard (EPA): DTXSID20204301

Chemical and physical data
- Formula: C_{10}H_{11}N_{3}O_{2}
- Molar mass: 205.217 g·mol^{−1}
- 3D model (JSmol): Interactive image
- SMILES: C1=CC2=C(C=C1[N+](=O)[O-])C(=CN2)CCN
- InChI: InChI=1S/C10H11N3O2/c11-4-3-7-6-12-10-2-1-8(13(14)15)5-9(7)10/h1-2,5-6,12H,3-4,11H2; Key:GPZRBKWRRKBOAC-UHFFFAOYSA-N

5-Nitrotryptamine, also known as Nitro-I, is a serotonin receptor modulator and psychedelic drug of the tryptamine family. It is the 5-nitro derivative of tryptamine.

The drug is a biased agonist of the serotonin 5-HT_{2A} receptor (K_{i} = 490–2,050 nM; EC_{50} = 0.11–491 nM; E_{max} = 44–108%). It shows high selectivity (10-fold) for activation of the G_{αq} pathway over β-arrestin2 recruitment and very high selectivity (>50-fold) for activation of the G_{αq} pathway over the G_{αi1} pathway.

Given via intracerebroventricular injection, Nitro-I produces the head-twitch response, a behavioral proxy of psychedelic effects, in rodents. This effect is absent in serotonin 5-HT_{2A} receptor knockout mice. Unlike 5-phenoxytryptamine (OVT2), Nitro-I does not produce serotonin 5-HT_{2A} receptor-mediated long-term memory deficits.

The chemical synthesis of Nitro-I has been described.

Nitro-I was first described in the scientific literature by 1953. Subsequently, it was studied and described in greater detail in 2015 and 2024.

== See also ==
- Substituted tryptamine
- 5-Nitro-DMT
