= 5-Methyltryptamine =

Clinical data
- Other names: 5-MeT; 5-Me-T; 5-Methyl-T; 5-MT; PAL-22; PAL22; NSC-90805; NSC90805
- Drug class: Serotonin receptor agonist; Serotonin releasing agent

Identifiers
- IUPAC name: 2-(5-methyl-1H-indol-3-yl)ethanamine
- CAS Number: 1821-47-2 1010-95-3 (hydrochloride)
- PubChem CID: 15760
- ChemSpider: 14987
- ChEBI: CHEBI:125675
- ChEMBL: ChEMBL331241
- CompTox Dashboard (EPA): DTXSID10171250

Chemical and physical data
- Formula: C_{11}H_{14}N_{2}
- Molar mass: 174.247 g·mol^{−1}
- 3D model (JSmol): Interactive image
- SMILES: CC1=CC2=C(C=C1)NC=C2CCN
- InChI: InChI=1S/C11H14N2/c1-8-2-3-11-10(6-8)9(4-5-12)7-13-11/h2-3,6-7,13H,4-5,12H2,1H3; Key:PYOUAIQXJALPKW-UHFFFAOYSA-N

5-Methyltryptamine (5-MeT, 5-Me-T) is a non-selective serotonin receptor agonist and serotonin releasing agent of the tryptamine family that has been used in scientific research. It is related to other 5-substituted tryptamines such as serotonin (5-hydroxytryptamine; 5-HT) and 5-methoxytryptamine (5-MeO-T). The compound is also a positional isomer of N-methyltryptamine (NMT).

== Pharmacology ==
5-MeT is known to act as a potent serotonin 5-HT_{2A} receptor full agonist, with an EC_{50} of 6.00 nM and an E_{max} of 100%. In addition, it is known to be a ligand of the serotonin 5-HT_{1A}, 5-HT_{2B}, 5-HT_{6}, and 5-HT_{7} receptors, and an agonist of the serotonin 5-HT_{1D} and 5-HT_{2C} receptors. Similarly to tryptamine and 5-MeO-T, but in contrast to serotonin, 5-MeT shows very low potency as an agonist of the serotonin 5-HT_{3} receptor (EC_{50} = 60,000 nM). It shows very weak affinity for the dizocilpine (MK-801) site of the NMDA receptor (IC_{50} = 12,000 nM).

In addition to acting as an agonist of various serotonin receptors, 5-MeT is a monoamine releasing agent (MRA), with high selectivity for induction of serotonin release over induction of dopamine and norepinephrine release (EC_{50} = 139 nM, >10,000 nM, and >10,000 nM, respectively, in rat brain synaptosomes). However, its potency for induction of serotonin release in this system is 23-fold lower than its potency as a serotonin 5-HT_{2A} receptor agonist.

Tryptamines without substitutions at the amine or alpha carbon, such as tryptamine, serotonin, and 5-MeO-T, are known to be very rapidly metabolized and thereby inactivated by monoamine oxidase A (MAO-A) in vivo and to have very short elimination half-lives. However, given intravenously at sufficiently high doses, tryptamine is still known to be able to produce weak and short-lived serotonergic psychedelic effects in humans.

== Chemistry ==
The predicted log P of 5-MeT is 1.84 to 1.9.

== See also ==
- 1-Methyltryptamine
- 2-Methyltryptamine
- 5-Acetyltryptamine (acetryptine)
- 5-Benzyloxytryptamine
- 5-Carboxamidotryptamine
- 5-(Nonyloxy)tryptamine
