= SB-206553 =

Chemical compound

Identifiers
- IUPAC name: 5-methyl-1-(3-pyridylcarbamoyl)-1,2,3,5-tetrahydropyrrolo[2,3-f]indole
- CAS Number: 158942-04-2
- PubChem CID: 5163
- IUPHAR/BPS: 189
- ChemSpider: 4979
- UNII: AL4387525T
- CompTox Dashboard (EPA): DTXSID9043984

Chemical and physical data
- Formula: C_{17}H_{16}N_{4}O
- Molar mass: 292.342 g·mol^{−1}
- 3D model (JSmol): Interactive image
- SMILES: Cn2ccc(c2c3)cc1c3CCN1C(=O)Nc4cccnc4
- InChI: InChI=1S/C17H16N4O/c1-20-7-4-12-10-16-13(9-15(12)20)5-8-21(16)17(22)19-14-3-2-6-18-11-14/h2-4,6-7,9-11H,5,8H2,1H3,(H,19,22); Key:QJQORSLQNXDVGE-UHFFFAOYSA-N

SB-206553 is a drug which acts as a mixed antagonist for the 5-HT_{2B} and 5-HT_{2C} serotonin receptors.

== Usage ==
It has anxiolytic properties in animal studies and interacts with a range of other drugs. It has also been shown to act as a positive allosteric modulator of α_{7} nicotinic acetylcholine receptors. Modified derivatives of SB-206553 have been used to probe the structure of the 5-HT_{2B} receptor.

== Development ==
SB-206553 was under development by GlaxoSmithKline for the treatment of anxiety disorders in the 1990s. However, its development was discontinued in 1996.
