= Indorenate =

Chemical compound

Clinical data
- Other names: TR-3369; TR3369; β-Methoxycarbonyl-5-methoxytryptamine
- Drug class: Serotonin receptor agonist

Identifiers
- IUPAC name: methyl 3-amino-2-(5-methoxy-1H-indol-3-yl)propanoate
- CAS Number: 73758-06-2
- PubChem CID: 71987
- ChemSpider: 64989
- UNII: AV9L041QA4
- CompTox Dashboard (EPA): DTXSID2048400

Chemical and physical data
- Formula: C_{13}H_{16}N_{2}O_{3}
- Molar mass: 248.282 g·mol^{−1}
- 3D model (JSmol): Interactive image
- SMILES: COC(=O)C(CN)c1c[nH]c(ccc2OC)c1c2
- InChI: InChI=1S/C13H16N2O3/c1-17-8-3-4-12-9(5-8)11(7-15-12)10(6-14)13(16)18-2/h3-5,7,10,15H,6,14H2,1-2H3; Key:YFEDJMLMWJSRJJ-UHFFFAOYSA-N

Indorenate (developmental code name TR-3369), also known as β-methoxycarbonyl-5-methoxytryptamine, is a tryptamine derivative which acts as an agonist at the 5-HT_{1A}, 5-HT_{1B} and 5-HT_{2C} serotonin receptors. It has anxiolytic, antihypertensive and anorectic effects, predominantly through action at 5-HT_{1A}, but with some contribution from the 5-HT_{1B} and 5-HT_{2C} subtypes, and possibly some other non-serotonergic targets also. In addition to the preceding serotonin receptors, indorenate may also act as an agonist of the serotonin 5-HT_{2A} receptor.

== See also ==
- Substituted tryptamine
- 5-Methoxytryptamine
- Acetryptine (5-acetyltryptamine)
