= SB-204741 =

Chemical compound

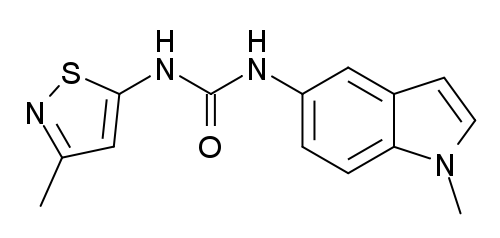

Clinical data
- Other names: SB-204,741

Identifiers
- IUPAC name: N-(1-Methyl-1H-indol-5-yl)-N'-(3-methylisothiazol-5-yl)urea
- CAS Number: 152239-46-8
- PubChem CID: 3277600
- IUPHAR/BPS: 221
- ChemSpider: 2526822
- UNII: 9VHM49MS42
- ChEBI: CHEBI:140936
- CompTox Dashboard (EPA): DTXSID80390956
- ECHA InfoCard: 100.150.276

Chemical and physical data
- Formula: C_{14}H_{14}N_{4}OS
- Molar mass: 286.35 g·mol^{−1}
- 3D model (JSmol): Interactive image
- SMILES: c2c(C)nsc2NC(=O)Nc3ccc1n(C)ccc1c3
- InChI: InChI=1S/C14H14N4OS/c1-9-7-13(20-17-9)16-14(19)15-11-3-4-12-10(8-11)5-6-18(12)2/h3-8H,1-2H3,(H2,15,16,19); Key:USFUFHFQWXDVMH-UHFFFAOYSA-N

SB-204741 is a drug which acts as a potent and selective antagonist at the serotonin 5-HT_{2B} receptor, with around 135x selectivity over the closely related 5-HT_{2C} receptor, and even higher over the 5-HT_{2A} receptor and other targets. It is used in scientific research for investigating the functions of the 5-HT_{2B} receptor.
