= AMAP-102 =

Clinical data
- Other names: AMAP102
- Routes of administration: Oral
- Drug class: Serotonin 5-HT_{2B} receptor antagonist; Serotonin 5-HT_{2C} receptor antagonist

AMAP-102 is a serotonin 5-HT_{2B} and 5-HT_{2C} receptor antagonist which is or was under development for the treatment of musculoskeletal pain and rheumatoid arthritis. It is taken by mouth.

The drug is or was under development by AnaMar AB. A phase 1 clinical trial was completed in 2009 and the results of a phase 2 trial were reported in 2014. It failed to reduce inflammatory pain in people with osteoarthritis in this trial and its development was said to have been discontinued. However, the drug is still listed as being in active development as of January 2025. The chemical structure of AMAP-102 does not appear to have been disclosed.
