= RS-127445 =

Chemical compound

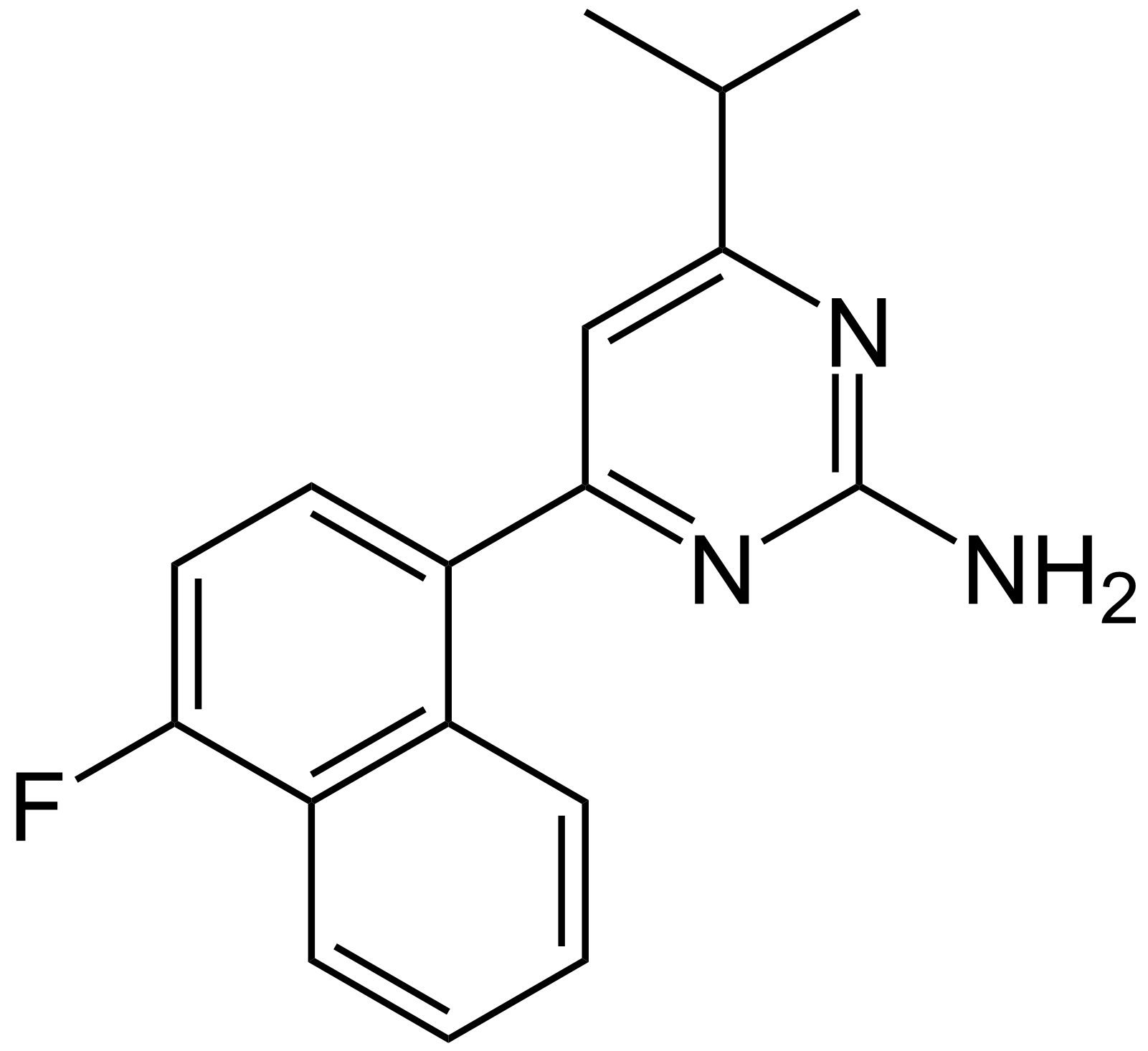

Clinical data
- Other names: RS-127,445; MT500; MT-500

Identifiers
- IUPAC name: 4-(4-fluoro-1-naphthyl)-6-isopropylpyrimidin-2-amine
- CAS Number: 199864-87-4
- PubChem CID: 196968
- IUPHAR/BPS: 188
- ChemSpider: 170590
- UNII: 0JAU3P8OBM
- ChEMBL: ChEMBL473186
- CompTox Dashboard (EPA): DTXSID60941960

Chemical and physical data
- Formula: C_{17}H_{16}FN_{3}
- Molar mass: 281.334 g·mol^{−1}
- 3D model (JSmol): Interactive image
- SMILES: Nc3nc(C(C)C)cc(n3)-c(cc2)c1ccccc1c2F
- InChI: InChI=1S/C17H16FN3/c1-10(2)15-9-16(21-17(19)20-15)13-7-8-14(18)12-6-4-3-5-11(12)13/h3-10H,1-2H3,(H2,19,20,21); Key:ZZZQXCUPAJFVBN-UHFFFAOYSA-N

RS-127445, also known as MT-500, is a drug which acts as a potent and selective antagonist at the serotonin 5-HT_{2B} receptor, with around 1,000-fold selectivity over the closely related 5-HT_{2A} and 5-HT_{2C} receptors. The role of the 5-HT_{2B} receptor in the body is still poorly understood, and RS-127445 has been a useful tool in unravelling the function of the various systems in which this receptor is expressed. The drug was under development for potential use as a pharmaceutical drug by Roche and reached phase 1 clinical trials but was discontinued for unknown reasons.

RS-127445 has been found to diminish the head-twitch response, a behavioral proxy of psychedelic effects, induced by the psychedelic drug LSD in rats but not in mice. It also blocked the persistent antidepressant-like effects produced by LSD in rats.
