= 5-Ethoxy-αMT =

Chemical compound

5-EtO-AMT

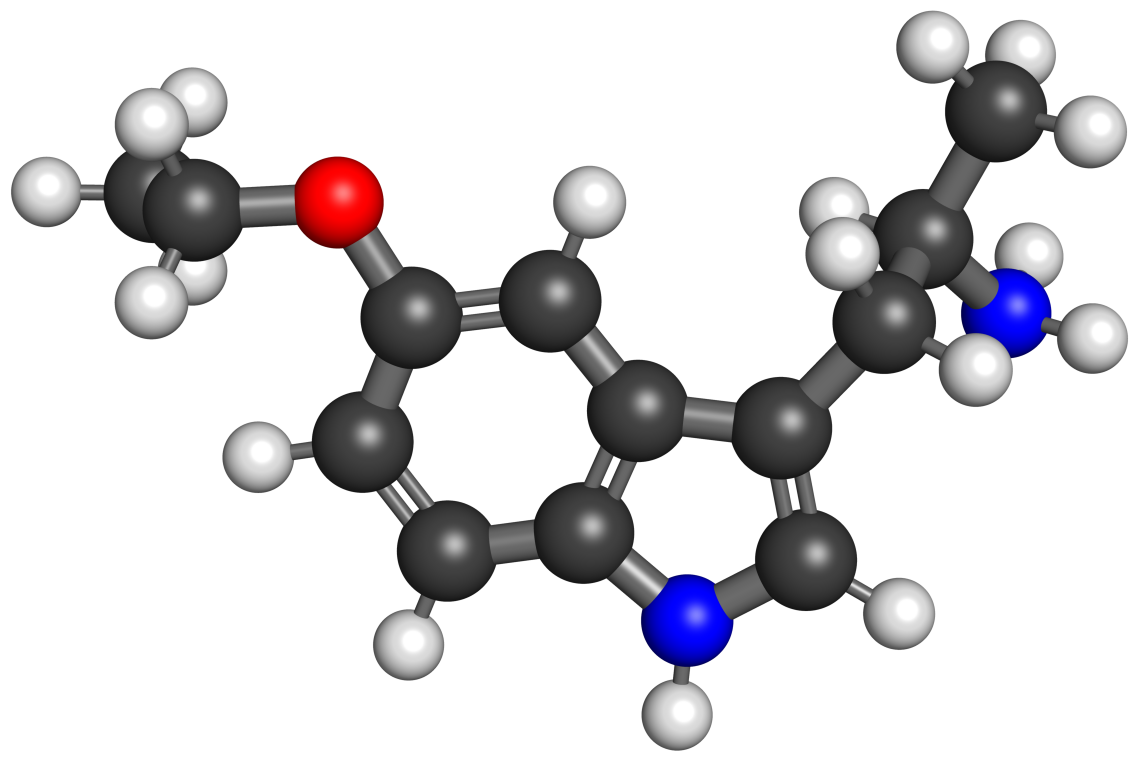

Identifiers
- IUPAC name: 1-(5-ethoxy-1H-indol-3-yl)propan-2-amine
- CAS Number: 101832-83-1
- PubChem CID: 59015
- ChemSpider: 53203
- CompTox Dashboard (EPA): DTXSID50906720

Chemical and physical data
- Formula: C_{13}H_{18}N_{2}O
- Molar mass: 218.300 g·mol^{−1}
- 3D model (JSmol): Interactive image
- SMILES: CCOC1=CC2=C(C=C1)NC=C2CC(C)N
- InChI: InChI=1S/C13H18N2O/c1-3-16-11-4-5-13-12(7-11)10(8-15-13)6-9(2)14/h4-5,7-9,15H,3,6,14H2,1-2H3; Key:RITFDCUITFOSHK-UHFFFAOYSA-N

5-Ethoxy-alpha-methyltryptamine (5-EtO-AMT) is a tryptamine derivative closely related to 5-MeO-AMT. It has an LD_{50} in mice of 56mg/kg, but its pharmacology has otherwise been little studied.

== See also ==
- 5-Allyloxy-AMT
- 5-Cl-AMT
- 5-F-AMT
- 5-EtO-DMT
- 5-MeO-AET
- O-Acetylbufotenine
