= 5-Phenoxytryptamine =

Clinical data
- Other names: 5-Phenyloxytryptamine; 5-PhO-T; OVT2; OVT-2; Otava 3736689
- Drug class: Serotonin 5-HT_{2A} receptor agonist; Serotonergic psychedelic; Hallucinogen
- ATC code: None

Identifiers
- IUPAC name: 2-(5-phenoxy-1H-indol-3-yl)ethanamine
- CAS Number: 31363-70-9
- PubChem CID: 35780
- ChemSpider: 32912
- ChEMBL: ChEMBL5275778
- CompTox Dashboard (EPA): DTXSID40185284

Chemical and physical data
- Formula: C_{16}H_{16}N_{2}O
- Molar mass: 252.317 g·mol^{−1}
- 3D model (JSmol): Interactive image
- SMILES: C1=CC=C(C=C1)OC2=CC3=C(C=C2)NC=C3CCN
- InChI: InChI=1S/C16H16N2O/c17-9-8-12-11-18-16-7-6-14(10-15(12)16)19-13-4-2-1-3-5-13/h1-7,10-11,18H,8-9,17H2; Key:ZURXROHPCVOMGH-UHFFFAOYSA-N

5-Phenoxytryptamine (5-PhO-T), also known as OVT2 or Otava 3736689, is a psychedelic drug of the tryptamine family related to 5-methoxytryptamine (5-MT; 5-MeO-T). It is the derivative of tryptamine and 5-methoxytryptamine in which there is a phenoxy group at the 5 position. The drug acts as a biased agonist of the serotonin 5-HT_{2A} receptor, favoring G_{αi} signaling over G_{αq} and β-arrestin1 signaling, though not favoring G_{αq} signaling over β-arrestin2 signaling. Its affinity (K_{i}) for the serotonin 5-HT_{2A} receptor is 57.5 nM and its activational potency at this receptor ranges from 0.28 nM to 15,800 nM and efficacy ranges from 30% to 91% depending on the downstream signaling pathway. OTV2, given via intracerebroventricular injection, produces the head-twitch response, a behavioral proxy of psychedelic effects, in rodents. In addition, it produces long-term memory deficits that are dependent on serotonin 5-HT_{2A} receptor activation in rodents. The drug was first described in the scientific literature by Elk Kossatz and colleagues in 2024. Other related compounds include OTV1, Met-I, and Nitro-I.

== See also ==
- Substituted tryptamine
- 5-Benzyloxytryptamine
- 5-Nitrotryptamine (Nitro-I)
- BW-723C86
