= MRS8209 =

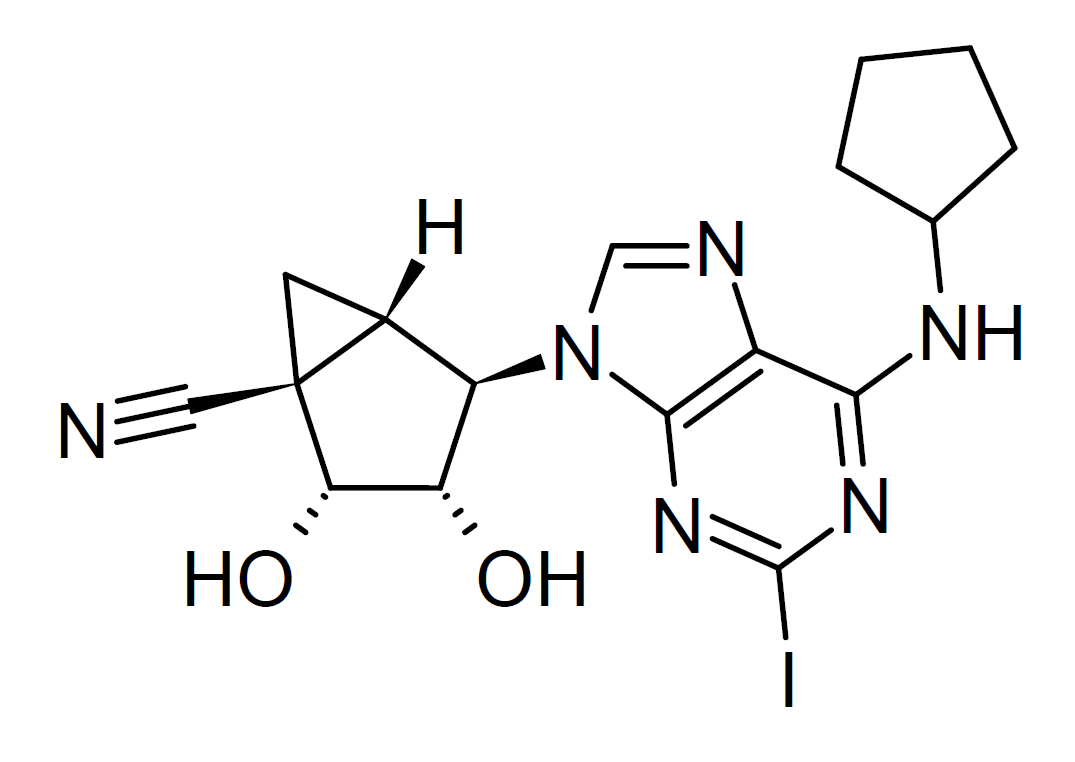

Identifiers
- IUPAC name: 4-[6-(cyclopentylamino)-2-iodopurin-9-yl]-2,3-dihydroxybicyclo[3.1.0]hexane-1-carbonitrile

Chemical and physical data
- Formula: C_{17}H_{19}IN_{6}O_{2}
- Molar mass: 466.283 g·mol^{−1}
- 3D model (JSmol): Interactive image
- SMILES: O[C@H]1[C@@H](O)[C@@H]([C@H]2C[C@]21C#N)n1cnc2c1nc(I)nc2NC1CCCC1

MRS8209 is an experimental drug which acts as a potent, peripherally selective 5-HT_{2B} receptor antagonist with high selectivity over other serotonin receptor subtypes. It has been investigated for possible applications in the treatment of heart and lung fibrosis and intestinal or vascular conditions mediated by 5-HT_{2B}, while sparing 5-HT_{2B} mediated activity in the brain.

== See also ==
- MRS7292
