= PRX-08066 =

Chemical compound

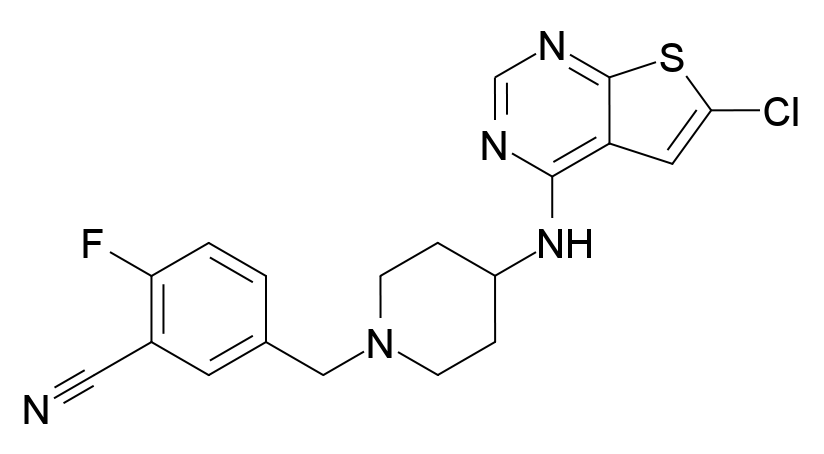

Identifiers
- IUPAC name: 5-((4-(6-chlorothieno[2,3-d]pyrimidin-4-ylamino)piperidin-1-yl)methyl)-2-fluorobenzonitrile
- CAS Number: 866206-54-4
- PubChem CID: 11502243
- ChemSpider: 9677045
- UNII: 82SK298EBU
- CompTox Dashboard (EPA): DTXSID60235710

Chemical and physical data
- Formula: C_{19}H_{17}ClFN_{5}S
- Molar mass: 401.89 g·mol^{−1}
- 3D model (JSmol): Interactive image
- SMILES: s3c2ncnc(c2cc3Cl)NC4CCN(CC4)Cc(ccc1F)cc1C#N

PRX-08066 is a drug discovered and developed by Predix (later Epix) Pharmaceuticals [Dale S. Dhanoa et al. Patent US 7,030,240 B2], which acts as a potent and selective antagonist at the serotonin 5-HT_{2B} receptor, with a 5-HT_{2B} binding affinity (K_{i}) of 3.4nM, and high selectivity over the closely related 5-HT_{2A} and 5-HT_{2C} receptors and other receptor targets. PRX-08066 and other selective 5-HT_{2B} antagonists are being researched for the treatment of pulmonary arterial hypertension, following the discovery that the potent 5-HT_{2B} agonist norfenfluramine produces pulmonary arterial hypertension and subsequent heart valve damage. In animal studies, PRX-08066 has been found to reduce several key indicators of pulmonary arterial hypertension and improved cardiac output, with similar efficacy to established drugs for this condition such as bosentan, sildenafil, beraprost and iloprost. It is also being researched for potential anti-cancer applications, due to its ability to inhibit fibroblast activation.
