= SB-200646 =

Chemical compound

Clinical data
- ATC code: none

Legal status
- Legal status: UN: Unscheduled

Identifiers
- IUPAC name: 1-(1-Methyl-1H-indol-5-yl)-3-pyridin-3-ylurea
- CAS Number: 143797-63-1
- PubChem CID: 126769
- ChemSpider: 112592
- UNII: RT8F72CL8L
- KEGG: C11739
- ChEBI: CHEBI:8976
- ChEMBL: ChEMBL85194
- CompTox Dashboard (EPA): DTXSID40162550

Chemical and physical data
- Formula: C_{15}H_{14}N_{4}O
- Molar mass: 266.304 g·mol^{−1}
- 3D model (JSmol): Interactive image
- SMILES: Cn1ccc2c1ccc(c2)NC(=O)Nc3cccnc3
- InChI: InChI=1S/C15H14N4O/c1-19-8-6-11-9-12(4-5-14(11)19)17-15(20)18-13-3-2-7-16-10-13/h2-10H,1H3,(H2,17,18,20); Key:OJZZJTLBYXHUSJ-UHFFFAOYSA-N

SB-200646 is a 5-HT_{2} receptor antagonist with anxiolytic properties in rats. It was the first 5-HT_{2} antagonist discovered to exhibit selectivity for the 5-HT_{2C}/_{2B} receptors over the 5-HT_{2A} receptor.
