= Azepindole =

Chemical compound

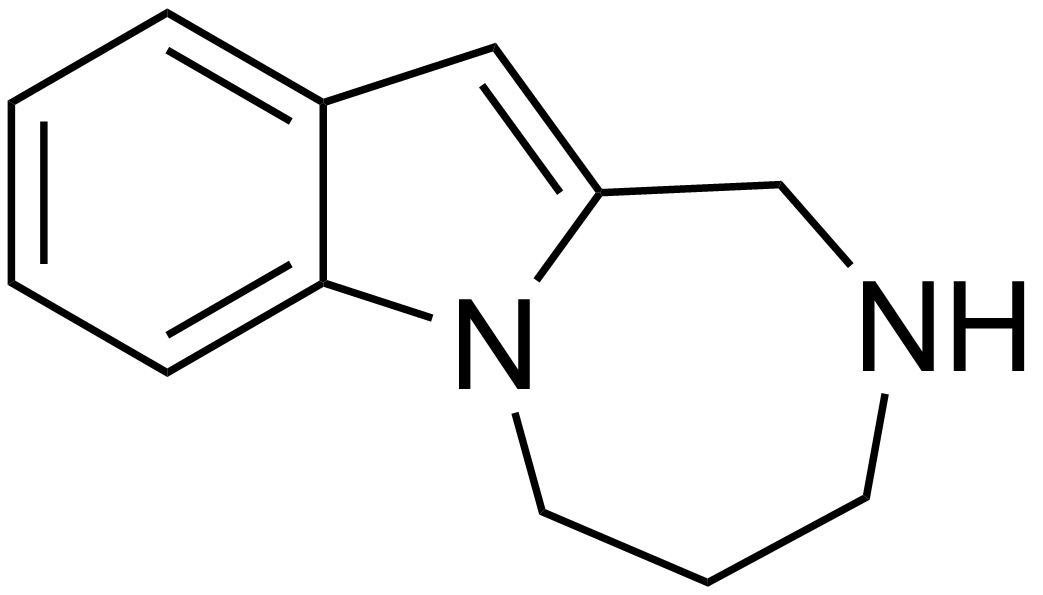

Clinical data
- ATC code: none

Identifiers
- IUPAC name: 2,3,4,5-tetrahydro-1H-[1,4]diazepino[1,2-a]indole
- CAS Number: 26304-61-0
- PubChem CID: 33471
- ChemSpider: 30893
- UNII: 6BB6FW9T8J
- KEGG: D03035
- ChEMBL: ChEMBL10758
- CompTox Dashboard (EPA): DTXSID40180916

Chemical and physical data
- Formula: C_{12}H_{14}N_{2}
- Molar mass: 186.258 g·mol^{−1}
- 3D model (JSmol): Interactive image
- SMILES: c13c(cc2n1CCCNC2)cccc3
- InChI: InChI=1S/C12H14N2/c1-2-5-12-10(4-1)8-11-9-13-6-3-7-14(11)12/h1-2,4-5,8,13H,3,6-7,9H2; Key:FEJCIXJKPISCJV-UHFFFAOYSA-N

Azepindole (McN-2453) is a tricyclic compound with antidepressant and antihypertensive effects that was developed in the late 1960s but was never marketed.

== See also ==
- Tricyclic antidepressant
