= CGS-13767 =

Names
- Preferred IUPAC name 2-Phenyl[1,2,4]triazolo[1,5-c]quinazolin-4(5H)-one

Identifiers
CAS Number	104614-81-5
3D model (JSmol)	Interactive image
ChEMBL	ChEMBL330116
ChemSpider	10496441
PubChem CID	135465884
UNII	HY8LL4S82Z
- InChI: InChI=1S/C15H10N4O/c20-15-16-12-9-5-4-8-11(12)14-17-13(18-19(14)15)10-6-2-1-3-7-10/h1-9H,(H,16,20) Key: AXPGZURVLRWNBR-UHFFFAOYSA-N
- SMILES: C1=CC=C(C=C1)C2=NN3C(=N2)C4=CC=CC=C4N=C3O

Properties
Chemical formula	C_{15}H_{10}N_{4}O
Molar mass	262.272 g·mol^{−1}
- Except where otherwise noted, data are given for materials in their standard state (at 25 °C [77 °F], 100 kPa). Infobox references

CGS-13767 is an anxiolytic GABA receptor ligand.
