= Fenharmane =

Clinical data
- Other names: Fenharman; Phenharman; Phenharmane; Fenoharman; Fenoharmane; Phenoharman; Phenoharmane; 1-Benzyl-1,2,3,4-tetrahydronorharmane; Benzyltetrahydronorharman
- Drug class: Sedative; Tranquilizer; Reserpine-like agent

Identifiers
- IUPAC name: 1-benzyl-2,3,4,9-tetrahydro-1H-pyrido[3,4-b]indole
- CAS Number: 3851-30-7
- PubChem CID: 71167
- ChemSpider: 64307
- UNII: 9E96TNX6EZ
- ChEMBL: ChEMBL323357
- CompTox Dashboard (EPA): DTXSID101043296

Chemical and physical data
- Formula: C_{18}H_{18}N_{2}
- Molar mass: 262.356 g·mol^{−1}
- 3D model (JSmol): Interactive image
- SMILES: C1CNC(C2=C1C3=CC=CC=C3N2)CC4=CC=CC=C4
- InChI: InChI=1S/C18H18N2/c1-2-6-13(7-3-1)12-17-18-15(10-11-19-17)14-8-4-5-9-16(14)20-18/h1-9,17,19-20H,10-12H2; Key:LHVNPTMRAQQPID-UHFFFAOYSA-N

Fenharmane (INN), also known as 1-benzyl-1,2,3,4-tetrahydronorharmane, is a sedative and tranquilizer of the β-carboline family. It has been said to have actions similar to those of reserpine, a monoamine-depleting agent. The drug has been reported to induce symptoms of depression analogously to reserpine. Fenharmane was developed in Czechoslovakia in the late 1950s.

== See also ==
- Substituted β-carboline
- LY-266,097
- LY-272,015
- NED-19
- NU-1223
- SL651498
- 1-Ethyl-6-hydroxytryptoline
