= EGIS-7625 =

Chemical compound

Clinical data
- ATC code: none

Legal status
- Legal status: UN: Unscheduled

Identifiers
- IUPAC name: 5-(4-Benzylpiperazin-1-yl)-2-methyl-4-nitroaniline
- CAS Number: 755040-97-2
- PubChem CID: 9930789
- ChemSpider: 8106420
- UNII: VVM6OT854G
- CompTox Dashboard (EPA): DTXSID701177281

Chemical and physical data
- Formula: C_{18}H_{22}N_{4}O_{2}
- Molar mass: 326.400 g·mol^{−1}
- 3D model (JSmol): Interactive image
- SMILES: CC1=CC(=C(C=C1N)N2CCN(CC2)CC3=CC=CC=C3)[N+](=O)[O-]
- InChI: InChI=1S/C18H22N4O2/c1-14-11-18(22(23)24)17(12-16(14)19)21-9-7-20(8-10-21)13-15-5-3-2-4-6-15/h2-6,11-12H,7-10,13,19H2,1H3; Key:ZEFXWOMFCPRXJW-UHFFFAOYSA-N

EGIS-7625 is a selective and competitive 5-HT_{2B} receptor antagonist. It is experimentally proven to be directly associated with smooth stomach muscle constriction of white rats in vivo, and variably effective in provoking a similar response in in vitro human stomach cells. In high blood concentrations, it causes mild constriction of rabbit pulmonary arteries.
