= LY-272015 =

Chemical compound

Clinical data
- Other names: LY272015; LY-272,015; 1-[(3,4-Dimethoxyphenyl)methy]-2,3,4,9-tetrahydro-6-methyl-1H-pyrido[3,4-b]indole
- Drug class: Serotonin 5-HT_{2B} receptor antagonist
- ATC code: None

Identifiers
- IUPAC name: 1-(3,4-dimethoxybenzyl)-6-methyl-2,3,4,9-tetrahydro-1H-β-carboline
- CAS Number: 172895-15-7
- PubChem CID: 9929424
- ChemSpider: 8105055
- UNII: 5NV3JP3GP6
- CompTox Dashboard (EPA): DTXSID701336801 DTXSID30432996, DTXSID701336801

Chemical and physical data
- Formula: C_{21}H_{24}N_{2}O_{2}
- Molar mass: 336.435 g·mol^{−1}
- 3D model (JSmol): Interactive image
- SMILES: c4cc(C)cc3c4[nH]c2c3CCNC2Cc(cc1OC)ccc1OC
- InChI: InChI=1S/C21H24N2O2/c1-13-4-6-17-16(10-13)15-8-9-22-18(21(15)23-17)11-14-5-7-19(24-2)20(12-14)25-3/h4-7,10,12,18,22-23H,8-9,11H2,1-3H3; Key:GDAJGLDMCDMPIR-UHFFFAOYSA-N

LY-272015 is a β-carboline derivative drug developed by Eli Lilly, which acts as a potent and selective antagonist at the serotonin 5-HT_{2B} receptor. It has anti-hypertensive effects in animal models, and is also used in research into the other functions of the 5-HT_{2B} receptor.

== See also ==
- Substituted β-carboline
- LY-266097
- Fenharmane
- 1-(2,4,5-Trimethoxyphenyl)-6-chlorotryptoline
