= LY-266097 =

Chemical compound

Clinical data
- Other names: LY266097; LY-266,097

Legal status
- Legal status: In general: uncontrolled

Identifiers
- IUPAC name: 1-[(2-chloro-3,4-dimethoxyphenyl)methyl]-6-methyl-2,3,4,9-tetrahydro-1H-pyrido[3,4-b]indole
- CAS Number: 208591-60-0
- PubChem CID: 9953185
- ChemSpider: 8128795
- UNII: 2Z9TC7YMY4
- ChEMBL: ChEMBL95121

Chemical and physical data
- Formula: C_{21}H_{23}ClN_{2}O_{2}
- Molar mass: 370.88 g·mol^{−1}
- 3D model (JSmol): Interactive image
- SMILES: CC1=CC2=C(C=C1)NC3=C2CCNC3CC4=C(C(=C(C=C4)OC)OC)Cl
- InChI: InChI=1S/C21H23ClN2O2/c1-12-4-6-16-15(10-12)14-8-9-23-17(20(14)24-16)11-13-5-7-18(25-2)21(26-3)19(13)22/h4-7,10,17,23-24H,8-9,11H2,1-3H3; Key:NJLHHCITDFZZSE-UHFFFAOYSA-N

LY-266097 is a synthetic β-carboline which acts as a potent and selective antagonist for the 5-HT_{2B} receptor, with more than 100x selectivity over the related 5-HT_{2A} and 5-HT_{2C} receptor subtypes. However, other sources have stated that LY-266097 is actually a biased agonist of the receptor, selective for G_{q} signaling but not β-arrestin2. The drug has been used to study the role of the 5-HT_{2B} receptor in modulating dopamine release in the brain, as well as its involvement in other processes such as allodynia.

== See also ==
- Substituted β-carboline
- Fenharmane
- LY-272015
- 1-(2,4,5-Trimethoxyphenyl)-6-chlorotryptoline
