= 5-HT2B receptor =

Mammalian protein found in humans

HTR2B
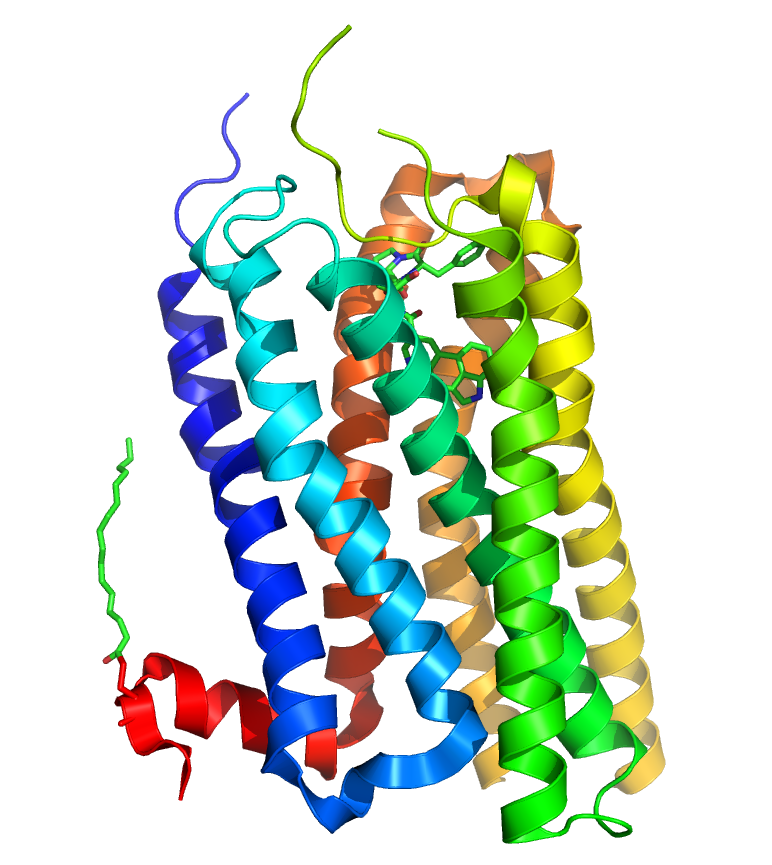

Identifiers
- Aliases: HTR2B, 5-HT(2B), 5-HT2B, 5-HT-2B, 5-hydroxytryptamine receptor 2B
- External IDs: OMIM: 601122; MGI: 109323; GeneCards: HTR2B
Available structures
PDB	Ortholog search: PDBe RCSB
PDB	List of PDB id codes 4NC3, 4IB4

Gene location (Human)
Chr.	Chromosome 2 (human)
Band	2q37.1	Start	231,108,230 bp
Band	2q37.1	End	231,125,042 bp

Gene location (Mouse)
Chr.	Chromosome 1 (mouse)
Band	1|1 C5	Start	86,026,748 bp
Band	1|1 C5	End	86,039,692 bp
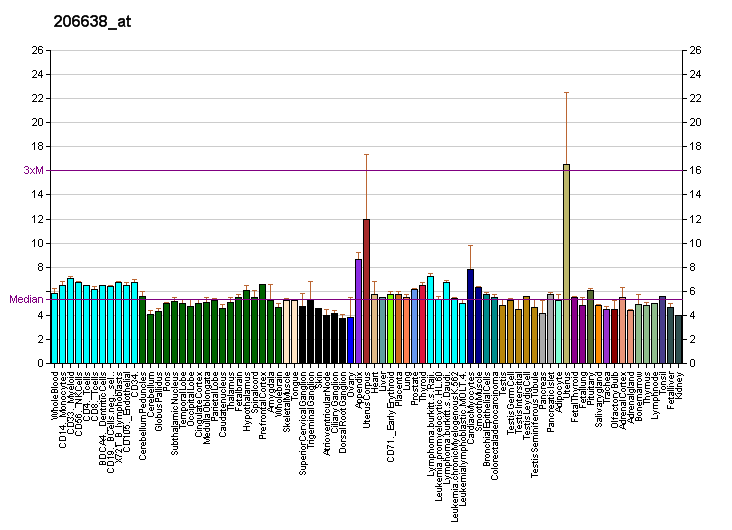
RNA expression pattern
Bgee	Human / Mouse (ortholog); Top expressed in: decidua; tail of epididymis; stromal cell of endometrium; caput epididymis; corpus epididymis; left adrenal gland; left adrenal cortex; right adrenal cortex; smooth muscle tissue; testicle / Top expressed in: decidua; morula; neural groove; neural fold; embryo; tail of embryo; genital tubercle; calvaria; right lung lobe; right kidney; More reference expression data
BioGPS	More reference expression data
Gene ontology
Molecular function	G protein-coupled receptor activity; GTPase activator activity; signal transducer activity; G protein-coupled serotonin receptor activity; G-protein alpha-subunit binding; serotonin binding; neurotransmitter receptor activity
Cellular component	cytoplasm; integral component of membrane; membrane; plasma membrane; synapse; cell junction; neuron projection; integral component of plasma membrane; nucleoplasm; dendrite
Biological process	intestine smooth muscle contraction; smooth muscle contraction; G protein-coupled receptor internalization; release of sequestered calcium ion into cytosol; regulation of behavior; positive regulation of endothelial cell proliferation; positive regulation of MAP kinase activity; phosphorylation; positive regulation of cytokine production; vasoconstriction; ERK1 and ERK2 cascade; positive regulation of phosphatidylinositol biosynthetic process; cardiac muscle hypertrophy; heart morphogenesis; cellular calcium ion homeostasis; neural crest cell differentiation; negative regulation of apoptotic process; negative regulation of cell death; activation of phospholipase C activity; protein kinase C signaling; cGMP biosynthetic process; cellular response to temperature stimulus; positive regulation of GTPase activity; development of the heart; positive regulation of nitric-oxide synthase activity; protein kinase C-activating G protein-coupled receptor signaling pathway; embryonic morphogenesis; serotonin receptor signaling pathway; neural crest cell migration; positive regulation of cell population proliferation; positive regulation of ERK1 and ERK2 cascade; positive regulation of I-kappaB kinase/NF-kappaB signaling; phosphatidylinositol 3-kinase signaling; negative regulation of autophagy; positive regulation of cell division; calcium-mediated signaling; signal transduction; phospholipase C-activating G protein-coupled receptor signaling pathway; G protein-coupled serotonin receptor signaling pathway; G protein-coupled receptor signaling pathway; animal behavior; cGMP-mediated signaling; G protein-coupled receptor signaling pathway, coupled to cyclic nucleotide second messenger; chemical synaptic transmission
Sources:Amigo / QuickGO
Orthologs
Databases	NCBI: entry; OMA: entry
Species	Human	Mouse
Entrez	3357	15559
Ensembl	ENSG00000135914	ENSMUSG00000026228
UniProt	P41595	Q02152
RefSeq (mRNA)	NM_000867; NM_001320758	NM_008311
RefSeq (protein)	NP_000858; NP_001307687	NP_032337
Location (UCSC)	Chr 2: 231.11 – 231.13 Mb	Chr 1: 86.03 – 86.04 Mb
PubMed search
- Wikidata
View/Edit Human	View/Edit Mouse

5-Hydroxytryptamine receptor 2B (5-HT_{2B}), also known as serotonin receptor 2B, is a protein that in humans is encoded by the HTR2B gene. 5-HT_{2B} is a member of the 5-HT_{2} receptor family that binds the neurotransmitter serotonin (5-hydroxytryptamine, 5-HT). Like all 5-HT_{2} receptors, the 5-HT_{2B} receptor is G_{q}/G_{11}-protein coupled, leading to downstream activation of phospholipase C.

== Tissue distribution and function ==
First discovered in the stomach of rats, 5-HT_{2B} was challenging to characterize initially because of its structural similarity to the other 5-HT_{2} receptors, particularly 5-HT_{2C}. The 5-HT_{2} receptors (of which the 5-HT_{2B} receptor is a subtype) mediate many of the central and peripheral physiologic functions of serotonin. Cardiovascular effects include contraction of blood vessels and shape changes in platelets; central nervous system (CNS) effects include neuronal sensitization to tactile stimuli and mediation of some of the effects of hallucinogenic substituted amphetamines. The 5-HT_{2B} receptor is expressed in several areas of the CNS, including the dorsal hypothalamus, frontal cortex, medial amygdala, and meninges. However, its most important role is in the peripheral nervous system (PNS) where it maintains the viability and efficiency of the cardiac valve leaflets.

The 5-HT_{2B} receptor subtype is involved in:

- CNS: inhibition of serotonin and dopamine uptake, behavioral effects
- Vascular: pulmonary vasoconstriction
- Cardiac: The 5-HT_{2B} receptor regulates cardiac structure and functions, as demonstrated by the abnormal cardiac development observed in 5-HT_{2B} receptor null mice. Excessive stimulation of this receptor causes pathological proliferation of cardiac valve fibroblasts, with chronic overstimulation leading to valvulopathy. These receptors are also overexpressed in human failing heart and antagonists of 5-HT_{2B} receptors were discovered to prevent both angiotensin II or beta-adrenergic agonist-induced pathological cardiac hypertrophy in mouse.
- Serotonin transporter: 5-HT_{2B} receptors regulate serotonin release via the serotonin transporter, and are important both to normal physiological regulation of serotonin levels in blood plasma, and with the abnormal acute serotonin release produced by drugs such as MDMA. Surprisingly, however, 5-HT_{2B} receptor activation appears to be protective against the development of serotonin syndrome following elevated extracellular serotonin levels, despite its role in modulating serotonin release.

== Clinical significance ==
=== Valvular heart disease ===
5-HT_{2B} receptors have been strongly implicated in causing drug-induced valvular heart disease. The Fen-Phen scandal in the 80s and 90s revealed the cardiotoxic effects of 5-HT_{2B} stimulation. Today, 5-HT_{2B} agonism is considered a toxicity signal precluding further clinical development of a compound.

=== Migraines ===
The non-selective serotonin receptor agonist meta-chlorophenylpiperazine (mCPP) induces migraines and this may be due to serotonin 5-HT_{2B} receptor agonism. Serotonin 5-HT_{2} receptor antagonists used as antimigraine agents, such as methysergide, cyproheptadine, and pizotifen, may be producing their antimigraine effects specifically via serotonin 5-HT_{2B} receptor antagonism.

== Ligands ==
The structure of the 5-HT_{2B} receptor was resolved in a complex with the valvulopathogenic drug ergotamine. As of 2009, few highly selective 5-HT_{2B} receptor ligands have been discovered, although numerous potent non-selective compounds are known, particularly agents with concomitant 5-HT_{2C} binding. Research in this area has been limited due to the cardiotoxicity of 5-HT_{2B} agonists, and the lack of clear therapeutic application for 5-HT_{2B} antagonists, but there is still a need for selective ligands for scientific research.

=== Agonists ===
==== Endogenous ====
- 5-Methoxytryptamine (5-MT) – trace amine
- DMT – trace amine
- Serotonin – neurotransmitter, K_{D} ≈ 10 nM
- Tryptamine – trace amine

==== Selective ====
- 6-APB – ~100-fold selectivity over the 5-HT_{2A} and 5-HT_{2C} receptors, ≥32-fold selectivity over monoamine release, ~12-fold selectivity over α_{2C}-adrenergic receptor
- α-Methylserotonin – ~10-fold selectivity over 5-HT_{2A} and 5-HT_{2C}
- BW-723C86 – 100-fold selectivity over 5-HT_{2A} but only 3- to 10-fold selectivity over 5-HT_{2C}, fair functional subtype selectivity, almost full agonist, anxiolytic in vivo
- LY-266,097 – biased partial agonist in favor of G_{q} protein, no β-arrestin2 recruitment
- VU6067416 – modest selectivity over 5-HT_{2A} and 5-HT_{2C}

==== Non-selective ====
- 25C-NBOMe
- 25I-NBOMe
- 2C-B
- 2C-B-FLY
- 2C-C
- 2C-D
- 2C-E
- 2C-I
- 4-Methylamphetamine
- 5-APB
- 5-APDB
- 5-Carboxamidotryptamine
- 5-MAPB
- 6-APB
- 6-APDB
- 6-MAPB
- 5-MeO-αMT
- 5-MeO-DiPT
- 5-MeO-DMT
- 5-MeO-MiPT
- AL-38022A
- Aminorex (weakly)
- Ariadne
- Benfluorex
- Bromo-dragonfly
- Bromocriptine
- Cabergoline
- Chlorphentermine (very weakly)
- CYB210010 (2C-T-TFM)
- Dexfenfluramine
- Dexnorfenfluramine
- Dihydroergocryptine
- Dihydroergotamine
- DiPT
- DOB
- DOC
- DOET
- DOI
- DOM
- Ergometrine (ergonovine)
- Ergotamine
- Fenfluramine
- Fenoldopam
- Guanfacine – an α_{2A}-adrenergic agonist, but has 5-HT_{2B} agonistic activity at therapeutic concentrations
- Levofenfluramine
- Levonorfenfluramine
- Lorcaserin
- LSD – about equal affinity for human cloned 5-HT_{2B} and 5-HT_{2A} receptors
- LSM-775
- mCPP (in humans; weak partial agonist)
- MDA
- MDMA
- MEM
- Mescaline
- Methylergometrine (methylergonovine)
- Methysergide (antagonist in some studies)
- Naphthylaminopropane
- Norfenfluramine
- ORG-12962
- ORG-37684
- Oxymetazoline
- Pergolide
- PNU-22394
- Psilocin
- Psilocybin
- Quipazine (weak partial agonist)
- Ro60-0175 – functionally selective over 5-HT_{2A}, potent agonist at both 5-HT_{2B/C}
- Ropinirole
- Quinidine
- TFMPP (weak partial agonist)
- VER-3323 – mixed 5-HT_{2C} and 5-HT_{2B} agonist with weaker 5-HT_{2A} affinity
- Xylometazoline

==== Peripherally selective ====
- AL-34662 – non-selective over 5-HT_{2A} and 5-HT_{2C}

==== Inactive ====
A number of notable drugs appear to be inactive or very weak as serotonin 5-HT_{2B} receptor agonists, at least in vitro. These include the stimulants and/or entactogens dextroamphetamine, dextromethamphetamine, 4-fluoroamphetamine, 4-fluoromethamphetamine, phentermine, methylone, mephedrone, MDAI, and MMAI, among others. Findings are somewhat conflicting for certain psychedelics, such as psilocin and LSD, but most studies find that these drugs are indeed potent serotonin 5-HT_{2B} receptor agonists.

=== Antagonists ===
==== Selective ====
- 5-HCPC
- 5-HPEC (weak)
- 5-HPPC
- AM1125
- AM1476
- BF-1 – derived from pimethixene
- EGIS-7625 – high selectivity over 5-HT_{2A}
- EXT5 – highly selective
- EXT9 – somewhat selective
- LY-23,728
- LY-266,097 – pK_{i} = 9.7, 100-fold selectivity over 5-HT_{2A} and 5-HT_{2C}
- LY-272,015 – fairly selective and highly potent
- LY-287,375
- MRS7925 – substantially selective over 5-HT_{2A} and 5-HT_{2C} but minimal selectivity over the adenosine A_{1} receptor
- MRS8209
- MW071 (MW01-8-071HAB) – non-MAOI minaprine analogue
- MW073 – highly selective, orally bioavailable
- PRX-08066 – K_{i} ≈ 1.7 nM, >100-fold selectivity
- RQ-00310941 (RQ-941) – K_{i} = 2.0 nM, IC_{50} = 17 nM, >2,000-fold selectivity against >60 targets, under development for medical use
- RS-127,445 (MT-500) – K_{i} = 0.3 nM, >1,000-fold selectivity over 5-HT_{2A} and 5-HT_{2C} and numerous other targets, selective over at least eight other serotonin receptors, developed for clinical use but discontinued
- SB-204,741 – >135-fold selectivity over 5-HT_{2C} and 5-HT_{2A}
- SB-215,505 – mixed 5-HT_{2B} and 5-HT_{2C} antagonist
- VU6047534 – weak partial agonist or antagonist, peripherally selective in mice but not humans

==== Non-selective ====
- 2-Bromo-LSD (BOL-148; bromolysergide)
- (–)-MBP – 5-HT_{2A} antagonist, 5-HT_{2B} inverse agonist, and 5-HT_{2C} agonist
- Agomelatine – primarily a melatonin MT_{1}/MT_{2} receptor agonist, with a less potent antagonism of 5-HT_{2B} and 5-HT_{2C}
- AMAP102 (AMAP-102) – 5-HT_{2B} and 5-HT_{2C} antagonist
- Amesergide (LY-237733)
- Amisulpride
- Amitriptyline
- Apomorphine
- Aripiprazole
- Asenapine
- BMB-201 – and active form BMB-A39a
- Brexpiprazole
- Brilaroxazine
- C-122
- Cariprazine
- Chlorpromazine
- Clozapine
- Cyproheptadine
- Desmethylclozapine (NDMC; norclozapine)
- Ibogainalog
- ITI-1549
- KB-128 – 5-HT_{2A} and 5-HT_{2B} antagonist and 5-HT_{2C} agonist
- Lisuride – a dopamine agonist of the ergoline class, that is also a 5-HT_{2B} antagonist and a dual 5-HT_{2A/C} agonist
- Lurasidone
- LY-53857
- Mesulergine
- Metadoxine – a 5-HT_{2B} antagonist and GABA-activity modulator
- Metergoline
- Metitepine (methiothepin)
- Mianserin
- Minaprine
- Molindone
- N-Methylamisulpride
- Nantenine
- Naphthylpiperazine (1-NP)
- Olanzapine
- Pimethixene
- Pipamperone
- Pizotifen (pizotyline)
- Promethazine
- Quetiapine
- Rauwolscine
- Risperidone
- Ritanserin
- SB-200,646 – 5-HT_{2B}/5-HT_{2C} antagonist, selective over 5-HT_{2A}
- SB-206,553 – mixed 5-HT_{2B} and 5-HT_{2C} antagonist and PAM at α_{7} nAChR
- SB-221,284 – 5-HT_{2B}/5-HT_{2C} antagonist
- SB-228,357 – 5-HT_{2B}/5-HT_{2C} antagonist
- SDZ SER-082 – a mixed 5-HT_{2B/C} antagonist
- Spiperone
- Tabernanthalog (TBG; DLX-007)
- Tegaserod – primarily a 5-HT_{4} agonist, but also a 5-HT_{2B} antagonist
- Terguride – an oral, potent antagonist of 5-HT_{2A} and 5-HT_{2B} receptors
- Trazodone
- Vabicaserin
- Viloxazine – weak 5-HT_{2B} antagonist and 5-HT_{2C} agonist
- Xanomeline – similar affinity as for muscarinic acetylcholine receptors
- Yohimbine
- Zalsupindole (DLX-001; AAZ-A-154)
- Ziprasidone

==== Unknown or unsorted selectivity ====
- AM1030 (AM-1030)
- Medmain and 1-methylmedmain
- TN-002

==== Peripherally selective ====
- IHCH-8110
- MRS8209
- Sarpogrelate (MCI-9042, LS-187,118) – non-selective 5-HT_{2} antagonist, but ~2 orders of magnitude lower affinity at 5-HT_{2B} than at 5-HT_{2A}
- VU0530244 – 5-HT_{2B}-selective
- VU0631019 – 5-HT_{2B}-selective
- VU6055320 – 5-HT_{2B}-selective
- Others (e.g., "compound 19c")

BW-501C67 and xylamidine are known peripherally selective antagonists of the serotonin 5-HT_{2} receptors, including of the serotonin 5-HT_{2A} and 5-HT_{2B} receptors, but their serotonin 5-HT_{2B} receptor interactions do not appear to have been described.

== Possible applications ==
5-HT_{2B} antagonists have previously been proposed as treatment for migraine headaches, and RS-127,445 was trialled in humans up to Phase I for this indication, but development was not continued. More recent research has focused on possible application of 5-HT_{2B} antagonists as treatments for chronic heart disease. Research claims serotonin 5-HT_{2B} receptors have effect on liver regeneration. Antagonism of 5-HT_{2B} may attenuate fibrogenesis and improve liver function in disease models in which fibrosis is pre-established and progressive.

== See also ==
- 5-HT receptor
