= 5-Methoxytryptamine =

Chemical compound

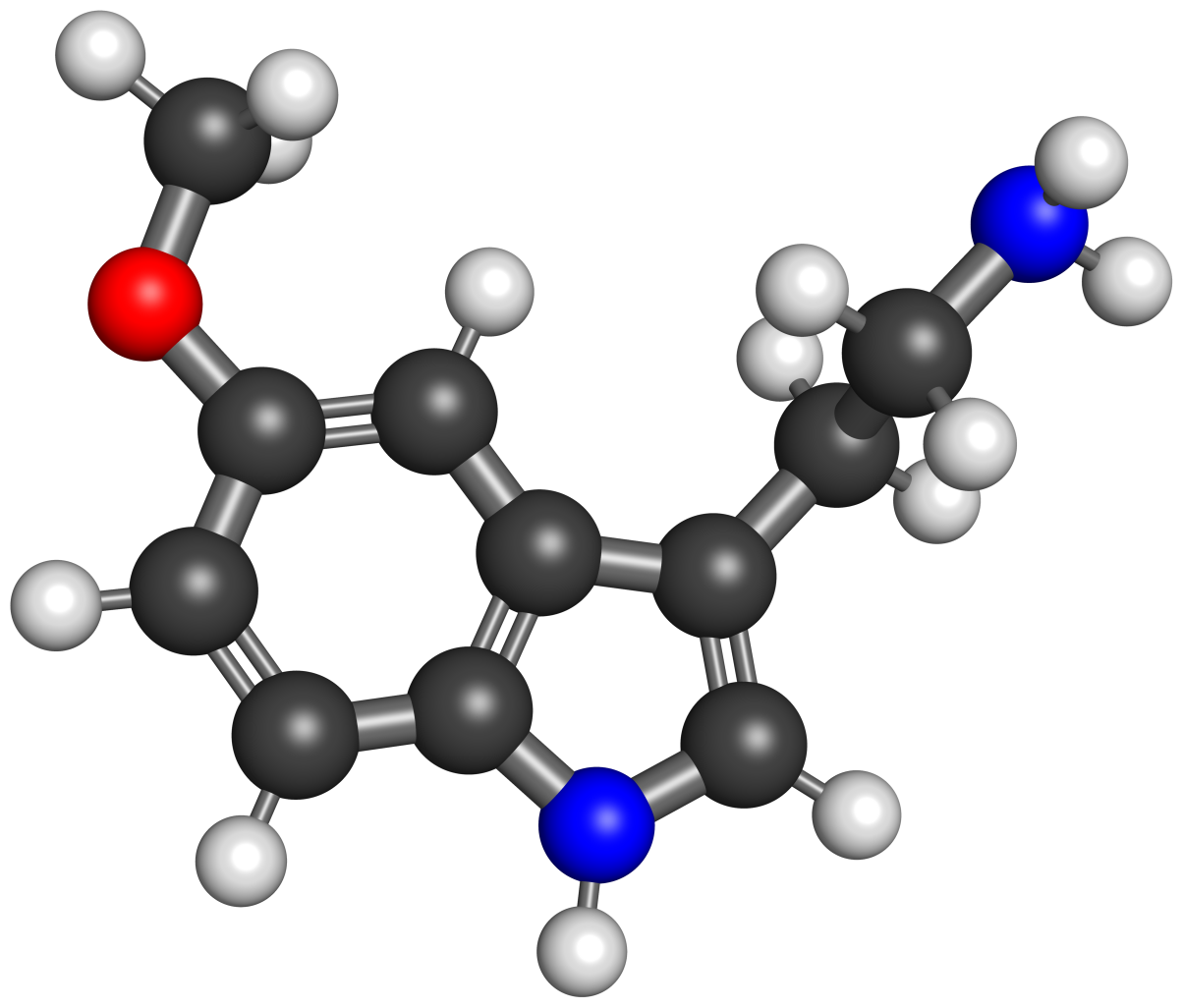

Clinical data
- Other names: 5-MeO-T; 5-OMe-T; 5-MeOT; 5-MeO-TPA; 5-MT; MT; 5-Hydroxytryptamine methyl ether; Serotonin methyl ether; O-Methylserotonin; O-Methyl-5-HT; Mexamine; Meksamin; Mekasamin; Meksamina; PAL-234; PAL234
- Routes of administration: Orally inactive
- Drug class: Non-selective serotonin receptor agonist; Serotonin 5-HT_{2A} receptor agonist; Serotonergic psychedelic; Hallucinogen

Pharmacokinetic data
- Metabolism: MAO-A

Identifiers
- IUPAC name: 2-(5-Methoxy-1H-indol-3-yl)ethanamine
- CAS Number: 608-07-1
- PubChem CID: 1833
- IUPHAR/BPS: 107
- DrugBank: DBMET01359
- ChemSpider: 1767
- UNII: 3VMW6141KC
- KEGG: C05659
- ChEBI: CHEBI:2089
- ChEMBL: ChEMBL8165
- CompTox Dashboard (EPA): DTXSID60209638
- ECHA InfoCard: 100.009.231

Chemical and physical data
- Formula: C_{11}H_{14}N_{2}O
- Molar mass: 190.246 g·mol^{−1}
- 3D model (JSmol): Interactive image
- SMILES: O(c1cc2c(cc1)[nH]cc2CCN)C
- InChI: InChI=1S/C11H14N2O/c1-14-9-2-3-11-10(6-9)8(4-5-12)7-13-11/h2-3,6-7,13H,4-5,12H2,1H3; Key:JTEJPPKMYBDEMY-UHFFFAOYSA-N

5-Methoxytryptamine (5-MT, 5-MeO-T, or 5-OMe-T), also known as serotonin methyl ether or O-methylserotonin and as mexamine, is a tryptamine derivative closely related to the neurotransmitters serotonin and melatonin. It has been shown to occur naturally in the pineal gland of the brain. It is formed via O-methylation of serotonin or N-deacetylation of melatonin.

5-MT is a highly potent and non-selective serotonin receptor agonist and shows psychedelic-like effects in animals. However, it is inactive in humans, at least orally, likely due to rapid metabolism by monoamine oxidase (MAO). The levels and effects of 5-MT are dramatically potentiated by monoamine oxidase inhibitors (MAOIs) in animals.

5-MT was first described in the scientific literature by at least 1925.

== Use and effects ==
5-MT is only briefly mentioned in Alexander Shulgin's TiHKAL (Tryptamines I Have Known and Loved) and its psychoactive effects are not described. Nonetheless, 5-MT has been said by other sources to produce mild psychoactive effects in humans. In addition, it has been reported to potentiate the effects of other drugs such as LSD and THC. The drug is said to be orally inactive in humans. It has been given to humans orally in clinical studies at doses of up to 8.5 mg/kg body weight (or ~600 mg for a 70-kg individual) without hallucinogenic effects described.

== Pharmacology ==
=== Pharmacodynamics ===
==== Actions ====
5-MT activities
Target	Affinity (K_{i}, nM)
5-HT_{1A}	3.2–9 (K_{i}); 1.1–535 (EC_{50}); 66–135% (E_{max})
5-HT_{1B}	0.75–38
5-HT_{1D}	1.7–34
5-HT_{1E}	397–3,151
5-HT_{1F}	1,166
5-HT_{2A}	4.8–724 (K_{i}); 0.50–9.0 (EC_{50}); 85–119% (E_{max})
5-HT_{2B}	0.51–16 (K_{i}); 0.7–1.6 (EC_{50}); 99–103% (E_{max})
5-HT_{2C}	7.1–943 (K_{i}); 0.1–1.5 (EC_{50}); 100–104% (E_{max})
5-HT_{3}	>10,000
5-HT_{4}	27–2,443 (K_{i}); 437 (EC_{50}) (pig); 107% (E_{max}) (pig)
5-HT_{5A}	45.5; 98 (unknown)
5-HT_{6}	18–119
5-HT_{7}	0.5–15
MT_{1}	>10,000
MT_{2}	>10,000
α_{2A}	1,835
α_{2B}	>10,000
α_{2C}	2,174
D_{2}	>10,000
D_{3}	>10,000
D_{4}	1,422
H_{1}, H_{3}	>10,000
σ_{1}, σ_{2}	>10,000
KOR	>10,000
SERT	>10,000; 4,000 (IC_{50}); 2,169 (EC_{50})
NET	>10,000 (IC_{50}) >10,000 (EC_{50})
DAT	>10,000 (IC_{50}); 11,031 (EC_{50})
Notes: The smaller the value, the more avidly the drug binds to the site. All proteins are human unless otherwise specified. Refs:

5-MT acts as an agonist of the serotonin 5-HT_{1}, 5-HT_{2}, 5-HT_{4}, 5-HT_{6}, and 5-HT_{7} receptors. Conversely, it is completely devoid of activity at the serotonin 5-HT_{3} receptor.

The drug is an extremely potent serotonin 5-HT_{2A} receptor agonist in vitro, with an EC_{50} of 0.5 nM in one study. This was more potent than any other tryptamine evaluated in a large series of compounds. For comparison, 5-MeO-DMT had an EC_{50} of 3.87 nM (7.7-fold lower) and dimethyltryptamine (DMT) had an EC_{50} of 38.3 nM (76-fold lower).

5-MT has been said in the past to be 25- and 400-fold selective for the serotonin 5-HT_{2B} receptor over the serotonin 5-HT_{2A} and 5-HT_{2C} receptors, respectively. Conversely however, a more modern study found EC_{50} values for activation of G_{αq} signaling of 2.6 nM at the serotonin 5-HT_{2A} receptor, 0.7 nM at the serotonin 5-HT_{2B} receptor, and 0.1 nM at the serotonin 5-HT_{2C} receptor, indicating preference for the serotonin 5-HT_{2C} receptor rather than for the serotonin 5-HT_{2B} receptor.

The drug has been found to show substantially higher affinity for the serotonin 5-HT_{1A} receptor than tryptamine or DMT (K_{i} = 6.1 nM, 125 nM, and 245 nM, respectively; 20- to 40-fold higher affinity). On the other hand, it shows slightly lower affinity for this receptor than serotonin but a little more than twice the affinity of 5-MeO-DMT (K_{i} = 3.2 nM, 1.7 nM, and 7.8 nM, respectively).

5-MT, in contrast to the closely related melatonin, has no affinity for the melatonin receptors. Conversely, in Tango assay at a concentration of 10 μM, it displayed agonist-like activity at the melatonin MT_{1} receptor. The drug may also be converted into melatonin in the body, and hence may indirectly act as a melatonin receptor agonist.

5-MT shows dramatically reduced activity as a monoamine releasing agent compared to tryptamine and serotonin.

==== Effects ====
Both tryptamine and 5-MT failed to substitute for 5-MeO-DMT in rodent drug discrimination tests. Instead, only behavioral disruption occurred, which it was theorized might be a peripherally mediated effect.

On the other hand, 5-MT dose-dependently induces the head-twitch response (HTR), a behavioral proxy of psychedelic effects, in rodents, and this effect is reversed by serotonin 5-HT_{2A} receptor antagonists. As such, it may theoretically be hallucinogenic in humans. However, in a couple of other more recent studies, 5-MT failed to produce the HTR, instead inducing only serotonin 5-HT_{1A} receptor-mediated hypothermia and hypolocomotion. In one of these studies, the ED_{50} of 5-MT in producing the HTR was greater than 30 mg/kg, whereas the ED_{50} of 5-MeO-DMT was 0.33 mg/kg, an at least 91-fold difference in dose. Conversely, the drug was 2.8-fold more potent than 5-MeO-DMT in producing hypolocomotion and was only slightly less potent than 5-MeO-DMT in producing hypothermia. Co-administration of the serotonin 5-HT_{1A} receptor antagonist WAY-100635 did not unmask an HTR with 5-MT, similarly to the case of 5-MeO-NMT but in contrast to the case of 5-MeO-NET. It was hypothesized that reduced blood–brain barrier permeability with drugs like 5-MT might be involved in these findings.

Besides the preceding effects, 5-MT produces a "hyperactivity syndrome" in rodents. It produces various other effects in animals as well. 5-MT has been reported to produce weak psychedelic-like behavioral effects in monkeys at relatively high doses of 10 to 20 mg/kg. The drug has also been studied as a possible LSD antagonist in rodents.

=== Pharmacokinetics ===
==== Absorption ====
5-MT is said to be orally inactive in humans presumably due to rapid metabolism by monoamine oxidase (MAO).

==== Distribution ====
5-MT is able to cross the blood–brain barrier and enter the central nervous system with peripheral administration in animals. However, it has also been reported that 5-MT shows strong peripheral selectivity in animals comparable to serotonin and bufotenin and that its capacity to exert central effects is limited.

==== Metabolism ====
5-MT is metabolized by deamination by monoamine oxidase (MAO), specifically monoamine oxidase A (MAO-A) and to a much lesser extent by monoamine oxidase B (MAO-B). Metabolites of 5-MT include 5-methoxyindole-3-acetic acid (5-MIAA) and 5-methoxytryptophol. It may also be metabolized into melatonin.

Brain levels of 5-MT following central administration of 5-MT in rats were potentiated by 20-fold by the MAO-A inhibitor clorgyline and by 5.5-fold by the MAO-B inhibitor selegiline. Similarly, levels of serotonin and phenethylamine were also greatly elevated by these drugs. In accordance with the potentiation of brain levels of 5-MT by MAOIs, the behavioral effects of centrally administered 5-MT in rats, for instance in the conditioned avoidance response test, are markedly enhanced by MAOIs, including by the dual MAO-A and MAO-B inhibitor iproniazid as well as by clorgyline and selegiline. The non-selective MAO-A and MAO-B inhibitor tranylcypromine has also been frequently used to potentiate the effects of 5-MT in animal studies. Similarly to the exogenous rat findings, pineal gland levels of endogenous 5-MT are dramatically elevated by the MAO-A inhibitor clorgyline and by the dual MAO-A and MAO-B inhibitor pargyline in hamsters, and plasma levels of exogenous 5-MT are greatly elevated by these MAOIs as well. Conversely, selegiline was ineffective in elevating brain or plasma 5-MT levels in hamsters.

== Chemistry ==
5-MT, also known as 5-methoxytryptamine or as 5-hydroxytrypamine O-methyl ether, is a substituted tryptamine and a derivative of serotonin (5-hydroxytryptamine) and precursor of melatonin (N-acetyl-5-methoxytryptamine).

=== Synthesis ===
The chemical synthesis of 5-MT has been described.

=== Properties ===
The predicted log P of 5-MT is 0.5 to 1.41.

=== Analogues and derivatives ===
5-MT is closely related to other 5-methoxylated tryptamines such as 5-MeO-NMT, 5-MeO-DMT, 5-MeO-DPT, 5-MeO-DiPT, 5-MeO-MiPT, 5-MeO-DALT, and 5-MeO-AMT. 5-MeO-AMT is orally active in humans, in contrast to 5-MT, and could be thought of as a sort of orally active form of 5-MT. Some other notable analogues of 5-MT include tryptamine, 2-methyl-5-hydroxytryptamine, 5-phenoxytryptamine, 5-benzyloxytryptamine, 5-carboxamidotryptamine, 5-methyltryptamine, 5-(nonyloxy)tryptamine, α-methyl-5-hydroxytryptamine, acetryptine (5-acetyltryptamine), and isamide (N-chloroacetyl-5-methoxytryptamine), among others. Cyclized tryptamine derivatives and analogues of 5-MT include RU-28253 and RU-24969 (5-MeO-THPI), among others.

α,α,β,β-Tetradeutero-5-methoxytryptamine (5-MT-d4), a deuterated isotopologue of 5-methoxytryptamine, has been described.

== Natural occurrence ==
=== Biosynthesis ===
5-MT can be formed by O-methylation of serotonin mediated by hydroxyindole O-methyltransferase (HIOMT) or by N-deacetylation of melatonin. It is also a precursor of 5-MeO-DMT in some species.

== History ==
5-MT was first described in the scientific literature by at least 1925. Subsequently, it was studied in the 1950s following the discovery of serotonin's chemical structure in the late 1940s and early 1950s. The drug was extensively studied under the name mexamine (or meksamina) as a radioprotective agent by the Soviet Union from the 1960s and thereafter. It briefly described by Alexander Shulgin in his book TiHKAL (Tryptamines I Have Known and Loved) in 1997. 5-MT was encountered online as a reported designer drug by 2023.

== Society and culture ==
=== Legal status ===
==== Canada ====
5-MT is not a controlled substance in Canada as of 2025.

==== United states ====
5-MT is not an explicitly controlled substance in the United States. However, it could be considered a controlled substance under the Federal Analogue Act if intended for human consumption.

== See also ==
- Substituted tryptamine
- Serotonin (5-hydroxytryptamine; 5-HT)
- N-Acetylserotonin
- Melatonin (5-methoxy-N-acetyltryptamine)
