= 5-Carboxamidotryptamine =

Chemical compound

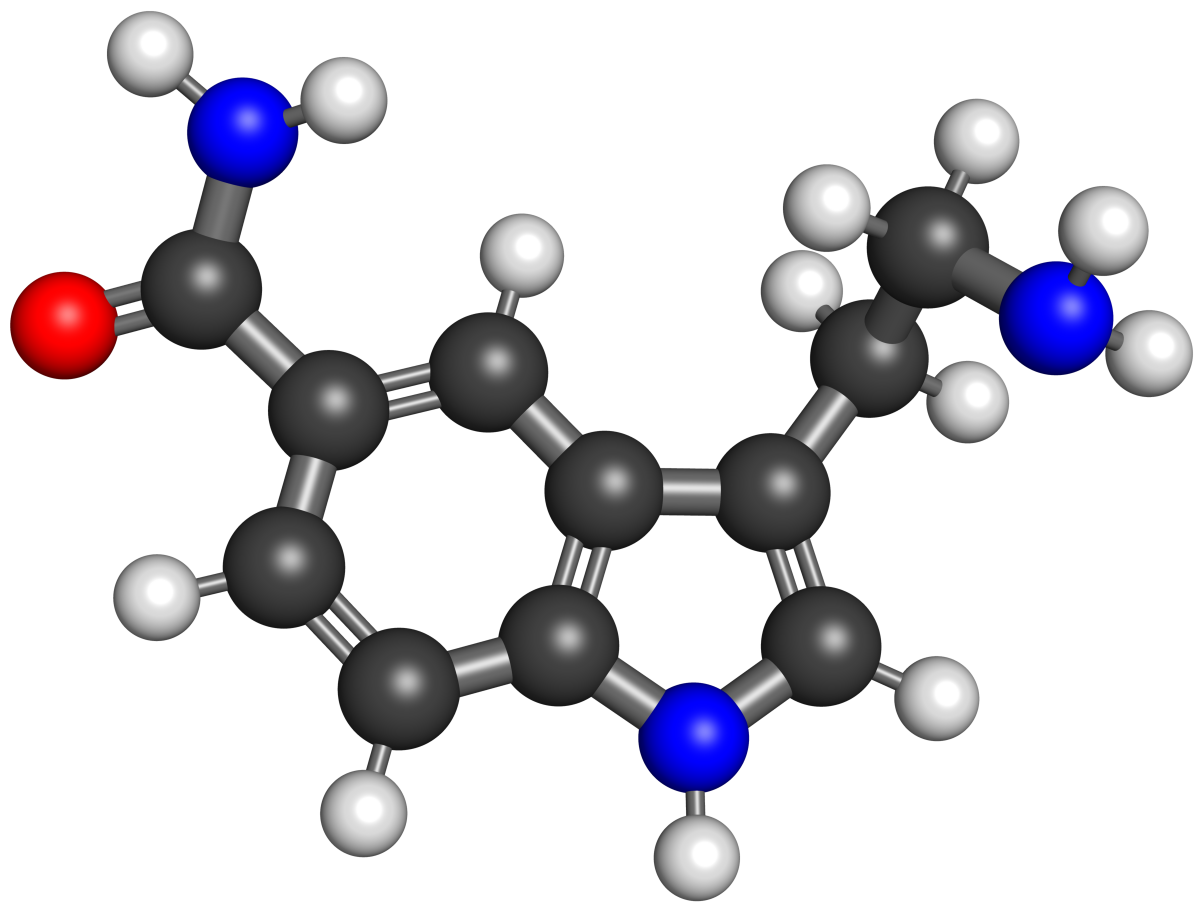

Clinical data
- Other names: 5-CT; 5-(Aminocarbonyl)tryptamine

Identifiers
- IUPAC name: 3-(2-Aminoethyl)-1H-indole-5-carboxamide
- CAS Number: 74885-09-9
- PubChem CID: 1809
- IUPHAR/BPS: 4
- ChemSpider: 1743
- UNII: 91H76044O0
- ChEBI: CHEBI:48292
- ChEMBL: ChEMBL18840
- CompTox Dashboard (EPA): DTXSID60996379

Chemical and physical data
- Formula: C_{11}H_{13}N_{3}O
- Molar mass: 203.245 g·mol^{−1}
- 3D model (JSmol): Interactive image
- SMILES: C1=CC2=C(C=C1C(=O)N)C(=CN2)CCN
- InChI: InChI=1S/C11H13N3O/c12-4-3-8-6-14-10-2-1-7(11(13)15)5-9(8)10/h1-2,5-6,14H,3-4,12H2,(H2,13,15); Key:WKZLNEWVIAGNAW-UHFFFAOYSA-N

5-Carboxamidotryptamine (5-CT), also known as 5-(aminocarbonyl)tryptamine, is a tryptamine derivative closely related to the neurotransmitter serotonin.

5-CT acts as a non-selective, high-affinity full agonist at the 5-HT_{1A}, 5-HT_{1B}, 5-HT_{1D}, 5-HT_{5A}, and 5-HT_{7} receptors, as well as an agonist of the 5-HT_{2}, 5-HT_{3}, 5-HT_{6} receptors with lower affinity. It has negligible affinity for the 5-HT_{1E} and 5-HT_{1F} receptors. 5-CT binds most strongly to the 5-HT_{1A} receptor and it was once thought to be selective for this site.

In 2018, a close derivative of 5-CT, AH-494 has been shown to function as an agonist of 5-HT7, although being more selective over 5-HT1A. Structural study indicated residue Ser5x43 might play critical roles in the selectivity of 5-CT across the serotonin receptor family.

== See also ==
- Substituted tryptamine
- 2-Methyl-5-hydroxytryptamine
- 5-Benzyloxytryptamine
- 5-Methoxytryptamine
- 5-Methyltryptamine
- α-Methyl-5-hydroxytryptamine
- Frovatriptan
- AH-494
- Acetryptine
- Sumatriptan
