= 5-Benzyloxytryptamine =

Chemical compound

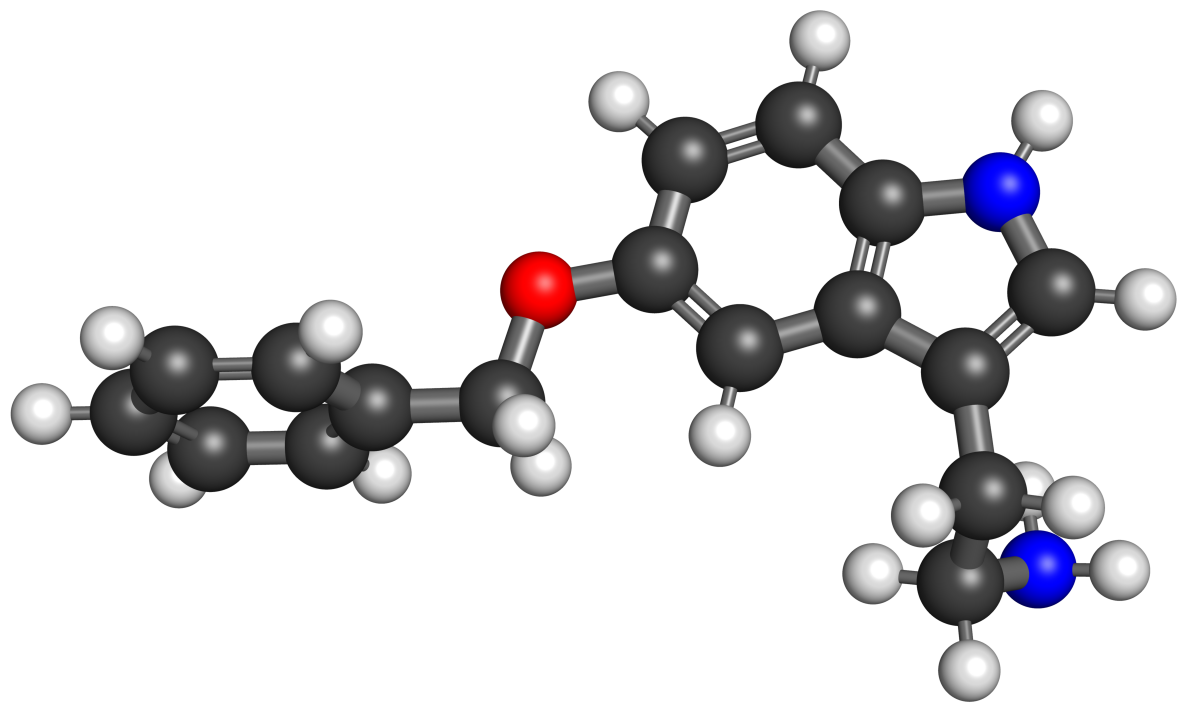

Legal status
- Legal status: Illegal in Singapore

Identifiers
- IUPAC name: 2-(5-phenylmethoxy-1H-indol-3-yl)ethanamine
- CAS Number: 20776-45-8
- PubChem CID: 89576
- IUPHAR/BPS: 265
- ChemSpider: 80845
- UNII: A83P5GDE4Q
- CompTox Dashboard (EPA): DTXSID60942992
- ECHA InfoCard: 100.040.007

Chemical and physical data
- Formula: C_{17}H_{18}N_{2}O
- Molar mass: 266.344 g·mol^{−1}
- 3D model (JSmol): Interactive image
- SMILES: NCCC1=CNC2=CC=C(OCC3=CC=CC=C3)C=C21
- InChI: InChI=1S/C17H18N2O/c18-9-8-14-11-19-17-7-6-15(10-16(14)17)20-12-13-4-2-1-3-5-13/h1-7,10-11,19H,8-9,12,18H2; Key:WKPDXBXNJWWWGQ-UHFFFAOYSA-N

5-Benzyloxytryptamine (5-BT), is a tryptamine derivative which acts as an agonist at the 5-HT_{1D}, 5-HT_{2} and 5-HT_{6} serotonin receptors, and an antagonist of TRPM8.

== Society and culture ==
=== Legal status ===
==== Singapore ====
5-Benzyloxytryptamine is illegal in Singapore.

== See also ==
- Substituted tryptamine
- 5-Phenoxytryptamine
- 5-Carboxamidotryptamine
- 5-Allyloxy-AMT
- 5-Methoxytryptamine
- 5-Methyltryptamine
- BW-723C86
- Sumatriptan
