= 1,4-Cyclohexanedione =

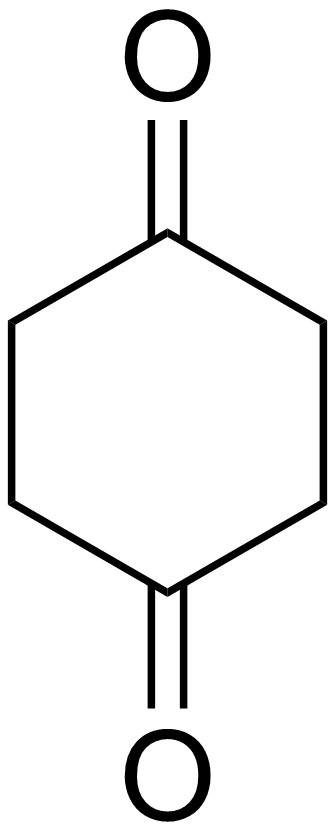
- Chemical structure of Cyclohexanedione

Names
- Preferred IUPAC name Cyclohexane-1,4-dione

Identifiers
CAS Number	637-88-7
3D model (JSmol)	Interactive image
Beilstein Reference	774152
ChEBI	CHEBI:28286
ChemSpider	11995
ECHA InfoCard	100.010.279
EC Number	211-306-0
Gmelin Reference	101292
KEGG	C08063
PubChem CID	12511
UNII	BJS27Z99AM
CompTox Dashboard (EPA)	DTXSID6060929
- InChI: InChI=1S/C6H8O2/c7-5-1-2-6(8)4-3-5/h1-4H2 Key: DCZFGQYXRKMVFG-UHFFFAOYSA-N; InChI=1/C6H8O2/c7-5-1-2-6(8)4-3-5/h1-4H2 Key: DCZFGQYXRKMVFG-UHFFFAOYAA
- SMILES: C1CC(=O)CCC1=O

Properties
Chemical formula	C_{6}H_{8}O_{2}
Molar mass	112.128 g·mol^{−1}
Appearance	White solid
Melting point	77 to 78.5 °C (170.6 to 173.3 °F; 350.1 to 351.6 K)
Boiling point	130 to 133 °C (266 to 271 °F; 403 to 406 K) (20 mmHg)
Solubility in water	Very
Solubility	Soluble in ethanol. Insoluble in diethyl ether.

Hazards
- GHS labelling
Pictograms	(GHS07: Exclamation mark)
Signal word	Warning
Hazard statements	H315, H319, H335
Precautionary statements	P261, P264, P271, P280, P302+P352, P304+P340, P305+P351+P338, P312, P321, P332+P313, P337+P313, P362, P403+P233, P405, P501
Flash point	132 °C (270 °F; 405 K)
- Except where otherwise noted, data are given for materials in their standard state (at 25 °C [77 °F], 100 kPa). verify (what is ?) Infobox references

1,4-Cyclohexanedione is an organic compound with the formula (CH_{2})_{4}(CO)_{2}. This white solid is one of the three isomeric cyclohexanediones. This particular diketone is used as a building block in the synthesis of more complex molecules.

== Preparation ==
1,4-Cyclohexanedione is prepared in two steps from diesters of succinic acid. Specifically under basic conditions, the diethyl succinate condenses to give the cyclohexenediol derivative diethylsuccinoylsuccinate. This intermediate can be hydrolysed and decarboxylated to afford the desired dione.

This dione condenses with malononitrile to give an intermediate that can be dehydrogenated to tetracyanoquinodimethane (TCNQ).

== Reactions and uses ==
Protection of one of the carbonyl groups with ethylene glycol affords 1,4-cyclohexanedione monoethylene glycol ketal (1,4-dioxaspiro[4.5]decan-8-one). This compound is useful because it finds application in the synthesis of ramatroban, ciclindole, flucindole, LY-344864, frovatriptan, epibatidine, quinelorane, bromadol, and C-8813.
