= Tetrahydrocarbazolamine =

Tetrahydrocarbazolamines, or tetrahydrocarbazolylamines, also known as aminotetrahydrocarbazoles, are a group of cyclized tryptamines in which the indole ring has been cyclized into a tricyclic tetrahydrocarbazole ring system. They include the antipsychotics ciclindole and flucindole, the triptans frovatriptan and LY-344864, and the antiplatelet drug ramatroban. Tetrahydrocarbazolamines are known to act as serotonin receptor modulators, as well as modulators of other receptors such as dopamine and adrenergic receptors.

Chemical structures of selected tetrahydrocarbazolamines
Ciclindole

Flucindole

Frovatriptan

LY-344864

Ramatroban

== See also ==
- Cyclized tryptamine
- Substituted β-carboline
- Pirlindole, metralindole, and tetrindole
- Ondansetron and alosetron
