= C6H8O2 =

The molecular formula C_{6}H_{8}O_{2} may refer to:

- Cyclohexanediones
  - 1,2-Cyclohexanedione
  - 1,3-Cyclohexanedione
  - 1,4-Cyclohexanedione
- Cyclotene (maple lactone)
- cis-1,2-Dihydrocatechol
- Methylene cyclopropyl acetic acid
- 5-Methylfurfuryl alcohol
- Parasorbic acid
- Sorbic acid
