= C27H29N3O3 =

The molecular formula C_{27}H_{29}N_{3}O_{3} may refer to:

- NNC 63-0532
- NF-56-EJ40
