= Diethylsuccinoylsuccinate =

Names
- Preferred IUPAC name Diethyl 2,5-dihydroxycyclohexa-1,4-diene-1,4-dicarboxylate
- Other names 2,5-Dihydroxy-1,4-cyclohexadiene-1,4-dicarboxylic acid 1,4-Bis(ethoxycarbonyl)-2,5-dihydroxy-1,4-cyclohexadiene

Identifiers
CAS Number	16877-79-5
3D model (JSmol)	Interactive image
ChemSpider	10279533
PubChem CID	54679331
UNII	7ST9KV5XVD
CompTox Dashboard (EPA)	DTXSID80715660
- InChI: Key: NSWNRIHCLWQMCD-UHFFFAOYSA-N; InChI=1S/C12H16O6/c1-3-17-11(15)7-5-10(14)8(6-9(7)13)12(16)18-4-2/h13-14H,3-6H2,1-2H3
- SMILES: CCOC(=O)C1=C(CC(=C(C1)O)C(=O)OCC)O

Properties
Chemical formula	C_{12}H_{16}O_{6}
Molar mass	256.254 g·mol^{−1}
Appearance	white solid
Density	1.414 g/cm^{3}
Melting point	125–126 °C (257–259 °F; 398–399 K)
- Except where otherwise noted, data are given for materials in their standard state (at 25 °C [77 °F], 100 kPa). Infobox references

Diethylsuccinoylsuccinate is an organic compound with the formula [CH_{2}C(OH)=C(CO_{2}Et)]_{2} (Et = ethyl). A tetrasubstituted derivative of 1,4-cyclohexadiene, the compound is the enol tautomer of the corresponding cyclohexanedione. It is produced by base-induced condensation of diethyl succinate:

2C_{2}H_{5}O_{2}CCH_{2}CH_{2}CO_{2}C_{2}H_{5} → [CH_{2}C(OH)=C(CO_{2}C_{2}H_{5})]_{2} + 2 C_{2}H_{5}OH

Diethylsuccinylsuccinate is valued as a precursor to the quinacridone pigments. For example, it reacts with two equiv of anilines to give the diamines [CH_{2}C(N(H)Ar)=C(CO_{2}Et)]_{2}, which undergoes cyclization upon treatment with acid to give dihydroquinacridone.

When heated in the presence of acid, diethylsuccinoylsuccinate converts to 1,4-cyclohexanedione via hydrolysis of the esters followed by decarboxylation.
