= RSBN1 =

Protein-coding gene in humans

Identifiers
- Aliases: RSBN1, ROSBIN, round spermatid basic protein 1, KDM9
- External IDs: OMIM: 615858; MGI: 2444993; GeneCards: RSBN1

Gene location (Human)
Chr.	Chromosome 1 (human)
Band	1p13.2	Start	113,761,832 bp
Band	1p13.2	End	113,812,476 bp

Gene location (Mouse)
Chr.	Chromosome 3 (mouse)
Band	3|3 F2.2	Start	103,821,436 bp
Band	3|3 F2.2	End	103,873,952 bp
RNA expression pattern
Bgee	Human / Mouse (ortholog); Top expressed in: caput epididymis; tail of epididymis; parotid gland; corpus epididymis; cerebellar vermis; superficial temporal artery; nipple; vena cava; sperm; trabecular bone / Top expressed in: spermatid; cumulus cell; Paneth cell; trigeminal ganglion; blood; mesenteric lymph nodes; lobe of cerebellum; ciliary body; cerebellar vermis; ascending aorta; More reference expression data
BioGPS	n/a
Gene ontology
Molecular function	oxidoreductase activity; metal ion binding; dioxygenase activity
Cellular component	nucleus
Biological process	chromatin organization
Sources:Amigo / QuickGO
Orthologs
Databases	NCBI: entry; OMA: entry
Species	Human	Mouse
Entrez	54665	229675
Ensembl	ENSG00000081019	ENSMUSG00000044098
UniProt	Q5VWQ0	Q80T69
RefSeq (mRNA)	NM_018364	NM_172684; NM_001356556; NM_001356557; NM_001356558
RefSeq (protein)	NP_060834	NP_766272; NP_001343485; NP_001343486; NP_001343487
Location (UCSC)	Chr 1: 113.76 – 113.81 Mb	Chr 3: 103.82 – 103.87 Mb
PubMed search
- Wikidata
View/Edit Human	View/Edit Mouse

Round spermatid basic protein 1 is a protein that in humans is encoded by the RSBN1 gene. RSBN1 is a lysine-specific demethylase that belongs to the Jumonji C (JmjC) histone lysine demethylase family, and it is associated with histone H4K20 demethylase activity and chromatin remodeling.
