= Histone demethylase =

Histone demethylase may refer to:

- Demethylase
- (Histone-H3)-lysine-36 demethylase
