= Pirlindole =

Chemical compound

Clinical data
- Trade names: Lifril, Pirazidol
- Routes of administration: Oral
- ATC code: None

Legal status
- Legal status: In general: ℞ (Prescription only)

Pharmacokinetic data
- Bioavailability: 20–30%
- Protein binding: 95%
- Metabolism: hepatic
- Onset of action: 2–8 hours
- Elimination half-life: up to 8 days
- Excretion: urine (50–70%), feces (25–45%)

Identifiers
- IUPAC name: 8-methyl-2,3,3a,4,5,6-hexahydro-1H-pyrazino[3,2,1-jk]carbazole
- CAS Number: 60762-57-4
- PubChem CID: 68802
- IUPHAR/BPS: 6638
- DrugBank: DB09244
- ChemSpider: 62039
- UNII: V39YPH45FZ
- KEGG: D08392
- ChEMBL: ChEMBL32350
- CompTox Dashboard (EPA): DTXSID8048230

Chemical and physical data
- Formula: C_{15}H_{18}N_{2}
- Molar mass: 226.323 g·mol^{−1}
- 3D model (JSmol): Interactive image
- SMILES: CC1=CC2=C(C=C1)N3CCNC4C3=C2CCC4

Pirlindole, sold under the brand names Lifril and Pyrazidol, is mainly a reversible inhibitor of monoamine oxidase A (RIMA) and secondly a serotonin–norepinephrine reuptake inhibitor (SNRI) which was developed and is used in Russia as an antidepressant. It is structurally and pharmacologically related to metralindole.

== Synthesis ==
Synthesis: Patents: Sino: Enantiomers:

The Fischer indole synthesis between p-Tolylhydrazine Hydrochloride [637-60-5] (1) and 1,2-Cyclohexanedione [765-87-7] (2) gives 6-methyl-2,3,4,9-tetrahydrocarbazol-1-one [3449-48-7] (3). Imine formation with ethanolamine [141-43-5] (4) gives CID:2838578 (5). Halogenation with phosphorus oxychloride gives (6). Intramolcular alkylation with the indole nitrogen resulted in Dehydropirlindole [75804-32-9] (7). Reduction of the imine with sodium borohydride completes the synthesis of pirlindole (8).

== See also ==
- Substituted β-carboline § Related compounds
- Metralindole
- Tetrindole
- List of Russian drugs
