= NF-56-EJ40 =

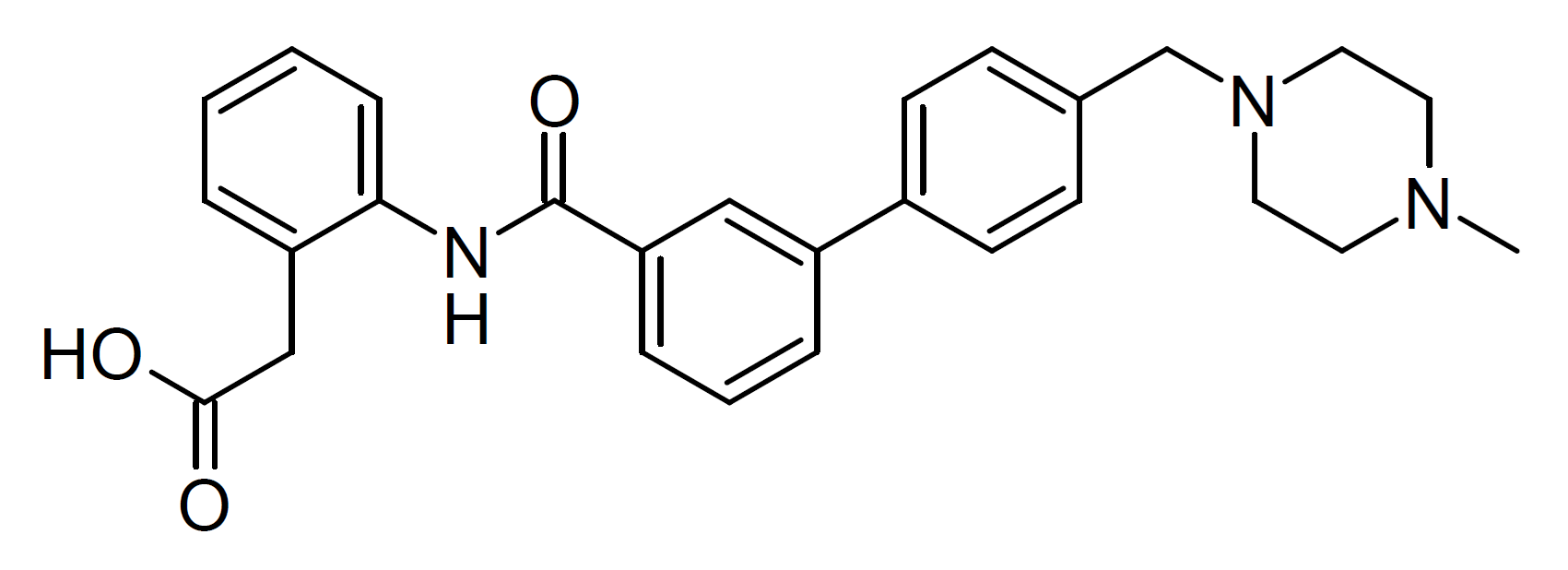

Identifiers
- IUPAC name: 2-(2-(4'-((4-Methylpiperazin-1-yl)methyl)-[1,1'-biphenyl]-3-carboxamido)phenyl)acetic acid
- CAS Number: 2380230-73-7
- PubChem CID: 138811017
- IUPHAR/BPS: 10519
- ChemSpider: 84421867
- ChEMBL: ChEMBL4790324

Chemical and physical data
- Formula: C_{27}H_{29}N_{3}O_{3}
- Molar mass: 443.547 g·mol^{−1}
- 3D model (JSmol): Interactive image
- SMILES: CN1CCN(CC1)CC2=CC=C(C=C2)C3=CC(=CC=C3)C(=O)NC4=CC=CC=C4CC(=O)O
- InChI: InChI=1S/C27H29N3O3/c1-29-13-15-30(16-14-29)19-20-9-11-21(12-10-20)22-6-4-7-24(17-22)27(33)28-25-8-3-2-5-23(25)18-26(31)32/h2-12,17H,13-16,18-19H2,1H3,(H,28,33)(H,31,32); Key:UTWXDNZWMQAUKL-UHFFFAOYSA-N

NF-56-EJ40 is an experimental drug which acts as a potent and selective antagonist for the succinate receptor SUCNR1 (GPR91). It has antiinflammatory effects and has been used to investigate the role of succinate in the development of conditions such as atherosclerosis and ulcerative colitis.
