= SUCNR1 =

Protein-coding gene in the species Homo sapiens

Identifiers
- Aliases: SUCNR1, GPR91, succinate receptor 1
- External IDs: OMIM: 606381; MGI: 1934135; GeneCards: SUCNR1

Gene location (Human)
Chr.	Chromosome 3 (human)
Band	3q25.1	Start	151,873,643 bp
Band	3q25.1	End	151,884,619 bp

Gene location (Mouse)
Chr.	Chromosome 3 (mouse)
Band	3|3 D	Start	59,989,290 bp
Band	3|3 D	End	59,994,987 bp
RNA expression pattern
Bgee	Human / Mouse (ortholog); Top expressed in: trabecular bone; bone marrow; renal medulla; thyroid gland; left lobe of thyroid gland; human kidney; testicle; right lobe of thyroid gland; bone marrow cell; renal cortex / Top expressed in: white adipose tissue; proximal tubule; left lobe of liver; right kidney; human kidney; subcutaneous adipose tissue; tunica adventitia of aorta; brown adipose tissue; intercostal muscle; sciatic nerve; More reference expression data
BioGPS	n/a
Gene ontology
Molecular function	G protein-coupled receptor activity; signal transducer activity; signaling receptor activity
Cellular component	integral component of membrane; plasma membrane; extracellular exosome; membrane
Biological process	signal transduction; G protein-coupled receptor signaling pathway; renin secretion into blood stream; macrophage activation involved in immune response; interleukin-1 beta production; glucose homeostasis; positive regulation of inflammatory response; positive regulation of chemotaxis; response to calcium ion; regulation of angiotensin metabolic process
Sources:Amigo / QuickGO
Orthologs
Databases	NCBI: entry; OMA: entry
Species	Human	Mouse
Entrez	56670	84112
Ensembl	ENSG00000198829	ENSMUSG00000027762
UniProt	Q9BXA5	Q99MT6
RefSeq (mRNA)	NM_033050	NM_032400
RefSeq (protein)	NP_149039	NP_115776
Location (UCSC)	Chr 3: 151.87 – 151.88 Mb	Chr 3: 59.99 – 59.99 Mb
PubMed search
- Wikidata
View/Edit Human	View/Edit Mouse

Succinate receptor 1 (SUCNR1), previously named G protein-coupled receptor 91 (GPR91), is a receptor that is activated by succinate, i.e., the anionic form of the dicarboxylic acid, succinic acid. Succinate and succinic acid readily convert into each other by gaining (succinate) or losing (succinic acid) protons, i.e., H^{+} (see Ions). Succinate is by far the predominant form of this interconversion in living organisms. Succinate is one of the intermediate metabolites in the citric acid cycle (also termed the TCA cycle or tricarboxylic acid cycle). This cycle is a metabolic pathway that operates in the mitochondria of virtually all eucaryotic cells. It consists of a series of biochemical reactions that serve the vital function of releasing the energy stored in nutrient carbohydrates, fats, and proteins. Recent studies have found that some of the metabolites in this cycle are able to regulate various physiological and pathological functions in a wide range of cell types, including roles in coordinating metabolic flux, mitochondrial function, and nutrient-dependent adaptation in hepatocytes.. The succinyl CoA in this cycle may release its bound succinate; succinate is one of these mitochondrial-formed bioactive metabolites.

SUCNR1 is a G protein-coupled receptor (GPR). GPRs are cell surface receptors that bind any one of a specific set of ligands which they recognize and thereby are activated to elicit certain types of responses in their parent cells. The human SUCNR1 protein is encoded (i.e. its synthesis is directed) by the SUCNR1 gene. This gene is located at band position 25.1 on the long (i.e., "q") arm of human chromosome 3 (gene location notated as 3q25.1). Most studies have reported that the SUCNR1 protein consists of 330 amino acids although a few studies have detected a 334 amino acid product of this gene.

Cells exposed to a potentially tissue-damaging condition (e.g., severe inflammation, low energy levels due to excessive physical activity, or ischemia, i.e., shortage of the oxygen needed for cellular metabolism) develop rising levels of succinate in their mitochondrial matrix. The excess mitochondrial succinate flows into the cells' cytoplasm, adjacent extracellular matrix, and circulatory system. In addition, the succinate in food as well as that released by certain microorganisms and helminths (i.e., parasitic worms) in the gastrointestinal tract are absorbed into the walls of the small and large intestines. The succinate released by cells works as a signaling molecule to stimulate diverse functions in cells near or, after entering the circulation, far from the cells of origin while the intestinal succinate may stimulate cells in the intestines' walls. The stimulating actions of succinate often involve the activation of the SUCNR1 on cells. However, succinate can also alter cell functions by succinylating (i.e., covalently binding as a succinyl group to) lysine amino acid residues in various proteins, by stabilizing the transcription factor HIF1A, by stimulating the production of reactive oxygen species, or by altering the expression of various genes (see Biological functions of succinate). Consequently, studies implicating SUCNR1 in the actions of succinate should show that its actions are suppressed by reducing the expression of SUCNR1, by blocking succinate's binding to SUCNR1. or by inhibiting the activity of SUCNR1.

The research conducted to date on the function of SUCNR1 has been mostly preclinical studies in animals. These studies have shown that the activation of SUCNR1 by succinate produces a wide range of beneficial or detrimental effects on: the breakdown of fat tissue triglycerides; obesity; fatty acid levels in the liver; certain fatty acid liver diseases; blood glucose levels; diabetes; and certain heart, kidney, eye, vascular, and inflammatory diseases; and certain cancers. Consequently, the use of methods that stimulate or inhibit SUCNR1 to treat these diseases runs the risk of producing very undesirable side effects. Studies are needed to better define the beneficial versus detrimental effects of these treatments in mice and carry the studies to humans in order to determine if blocking or promoting SUCNR1's actions can be used as a safe treatment strategy.

== Cells and tissues expressing SUCNR1 ==
SUCNR1 is expressed by human: a) hepatic stellate cells (i.e., pericytes found in the perisinusoidal space of the liver); b) neutrophils, macrophages, blood monocytes, monocyte-derived dendritic cells, CD34^{+} progenitor cells (i.e., bone marrow hematopoietic stem cells used therapeutically to restore hematopoiesis), blood platelets, megakaryocytes (i.e., platelet-producing cells), erythroblasts (i.e., red blood cell precursors), and the erythroleukemia cell line, TF-1; c) adipocytes (i.e., fat cells); d) endothelial cells in the veins and arteries of the placenta and umbilical cord; e) human umbilical vein endothelial cells; f) epithelial cells, fibroblasts, and certain cells in the lamina propria of the small and large intestines; g) mast cells; h) HK-2 cells (a kidney proximal tubule epithelial non-cancerous cell line); i) A549 lung, PC3 prostate, and HT-29 colin cancer cell lines; j) a subset (10%) of nasal solitary chemosensory cells; and k) cells in the retina, particularly retinal pigment epithelium cells.

== SUCNR1 activators and inhibitors ==
Succinate appears to be the primary agent that fully activates human SUCNR1. None of 800 tested compounds and 200 tested carboxylic acids fully activated SUCNR1 except for a) oxaloacetate, malate, α-ketoglutarate (α-ketoglutarate also activates the OXGR1 GPR receptor), and methylmalonate but were 5- to 10-fold less potent than succinate in doing so and b) two compounds/chemicals, cis-epoxysuccinic acid and cis-1,2-cyclopropanedicarboxylic acid, which were respectively similar to and 10- to 20-fold more potent than succinate in activating SUCNR1. Agents that have been found to inhibit SUCNCR1 activation include NF-56-EJ40, 1-ethyl-3-(3-dimethylaminopropyl)-carbodiimide, and three compounds identified as 2c, 4c, and 5g. 4'-O-methylbavachadone, an active ingredient of the Chinese herbal remedy fructus psoraleae, has been reported to inhibit the binding of succinate to SUCNR1.

== Functions regulated by SUCNR1 ==
=== Lipolysis and obesity ===
Succinate inhibited the isolated fat tissues of mice from the isoproterenol-induce metabolic hydrolysis of their triglycerides into free fatty acids and glycerol, i.e., it inhibited stimulus-induced lipolysis. However, succinate did not effectively inhibit isoproterenol-stimulated lipolysis in mouse fat tissues that lacked SUCNR1 due to the knockout of their Sucnr1 genes. This anti-lipolysis action was therefore due at least in part to succinate's activation of SUCNR1. In related studies, Sucnr1 gene knockout mice fed a high-fat diet for 20 weeks had significantly higher body fat content than wild type mice (i.e., mice expressing normal levels of SUCNR1) fed this diet. These differences did not occur or were minimal in mice fed a standard diet. Furthermore, the total body weights of Sucnr1 gene knockout mice on the high-fat diet for 4–12 weeks was higher than wild type mice on this diet but by 16 weeks was similar to wild type mice on the standard diet. Thus, SUCNR1 inhibited one feature of high-fat diet-induced obesity, the accumulation of excessive body fat, but had only short-term effects on another of its features, the development of excessive total body weight. Further studies in animal models and human fat tissues are needed in order to understand more fully SUCNR1's role in and relevancy to human lipolysis and obesity.

=== Hepatic metabolic regulation ===
Recent preclinical evidence indicates that SUCNR1 plays a role in regulating hepatic metabolism beyond its established functions in liver disease models. In mice, hepatic succinate levels and Sucnr1 expression vary according to nutritional status, supporting a role for SUCNR1 in linking extracellular succinate signaling to metabolic adaptation. Hepatocyte-specific deletion of Sucnr1 results in a fasting-like phenotype characterized by increased gluconeogenesis, elevated amino acid levels, and reduced metabolic flexibility. Mechanistically, loss of SUCNR1 impairs glucose-derived oxidative flux through the tricarboxylic acid (TCA) cycle and increases reliance on glutamine-dependent anaplerosis, accompanied by mitochondrial stress responses. In addition, SUCNR1 deficiency alters the hepatic response to refeeding, including reduced activation of the mammalian target of rapamycin (mTOR) pathway and incomplete glycogen restoration. These findings support a role for SUCNR1 in maintaining hepatic metabolic flexibility and coordinating nutrient-dependent metabolic responses.

=== Glucose metabolism and diabetes ===
In addition to evidencing increased levels of lipolysis (see preceding section), Sucnr1 gene knockout mice had increased plasma glucose levels, impaired glucose tolerance (i.e., abnormally slow decreases in blood glucose levels in response to a glucose challenge), and increased rates of resting metabolic activity. Some of these symptoms are features of human prediabetes. A study of 1152 type 2 diabetic versus 1152 heathy individuals conducted in China reported that three single-nucleotide polymorphisms (i.e., SNPs) in their SUCNR1 genes (viz., rs73168929, rs1557213 and rs17151584) were significantly more common in the diabetic individuals. (A SNP is a variation in a specifically identified nucleotide of a gene; the variation may alter the production, structure, and/or function of the protein directed to be made by the gene and is often identified as being associated with, and a potential cause of, a specific disease(s).). Gestational diabetes is a persistent increase in blood sugar levels first recognized during a woman's pregnancy and reversing after this pregnancy but over the following 3–6 years associated with a high risk of developing type 2 diabetes. A study of gestational diabetes patients reported that their placental tissues had significantly higher levels of succinate and SUCNR1 than the placentas of non-diabetic women. The study also reported that human umbilical vein endothelial cells (HUVECs) cultured in media with high levels of glucose (i.e., 20 mmol/l) expressed significantly higher levels of SUCNR1 than cells cultured in lower glucose levels (5.5 mmol/l); that succinate stimulated cultured HUVECs to proliferate, migrate, and heal wounds in assays of these functions; and that HUVECs that had their Sucnr1 gene knocked down showed significantly reduce proliferation and migration responses to succinate. Overall, these findings suggest that: a) SUCNR1 modulates glucose metabolism, glucose levels, and insulin resistance to cause a prediabetes-like condition in mice; b) certain SNP variants in the SUCNR1 gene are associated with and may contribute to the development of type 2 diabetes in humans; c) high levels of glucose stimulate HUVECs to increase their levels of SUCNR1; d) succinate-induced activation of the SUCNR1 on HUVECs stimulates their proliferation and motility; e) increases in placental succinate and SUCRN1 levels are closely associated with gestational diabetes; and f) SUCNR1 in the human placenta may be a target for treating excessive placental endothelial cell proliferation.

=== Liver diseases ===
Metabolic dysfunction–associated steatotic liver disease (i.e., MASLD), previously termed nonalcoholic fatty liver disease (i.e., NAFLD), is the excessive accumulation of fat in the liver resulting from metabolic disorders such as diabetes, the metabolic syndrome, obesity, and hyperlipidemia but not from excessive alcohol consumption. Nonalcoholic steatohepatitis (i.e., NASH), now termed steatotic liver disease (i.e., SLD), is a stage of MASLD that has higher levels of liver inflammation and may progress to advanced fibrosis, cirrhosis, liver failure, and liver cancer. Studies in mouse models of MASLD progressing to hepatic fibrosis have reported that: a) the levels of succinate (as well as 3-hydroxybutyrate and malate) were higher in the livers of mice on a high-fat diet than mice on a normal diet; b) the levels of SUCNR1 in the liver's hepatic stellate cells were far greater in mice on the high-fat diet than in mice on a normal diet; c) contrasting results were reported in studies finding that Sucnr1 gene knockdown mice fed a MASLD-inducing methionine- and choline-deficient diet had lower levels of steatosis (i.e., fat accumulation) and fibrosis in their livers than wild type mice but other studies finding that Sucnr1 gene knockdown mice feeding on a high-fat, choline deficient MASLD-inducing diet developed higher levels of steatosis and inflammation along with lower levels of fibrosis and glycogen in their livers than wild type mice (These different results may reflect differences in the diet compositions, durations, and/or stages of diseases examined.); d) succinate stimulated increases in the expression of SUCNR1 in cultured hepatic satellite cells that were isolated from the livers of rats or humans; e) analyses of the MASLD livers from patients showed that their livers' fibrosis levels increased with their livers' SUCNR1 levels. and f) the circulating blood levels of succinate were higher in 86 patients with higher fatty liver indexes than in 5 healthy individuals (this index is a composite score based on an individual's waist circumferences, basal metabolic rate, blood triglyceride level, and blood gamma-glutamyl transferase level). Further detailed studies are needed to clarify the role(s) of SUCNR1 in the progression of MASLD to more severe liver disease in mice and humans. The studies do suggest that the fatty liver index may be a useful non-invasive indicator of MASLD in humans.

=== Heart diseases ===
Mice treated with intravenous succinate for 5 consecutive days developed ventricular hypertrophy as defined by increases in the size of their cardiac muscle cells. These increases did not occur in SUCNR1 gene knockout mice. Furthermore, 8 patients diagnosed with acute myocardial infarction and/or chronic coronary artery disease had readily detectable serum blood levels of succinate whereas 6 healthy individuals had undetectable serum levels of succinate. These studies suggest that the succinate-induced activation of SUCNR1 plays a key role in pathological cardiomyocyte hypertrophy in mice and support studies to determine if it does so in humans.

Elderly individuals, even if otherwise healthy, can develop cardiac fibrosis severe enough to promote the development of a form of heart failure termed heart failure with preserved ejection fraction, i.e., HFpEF. HFpEF is characterized by diastolic dysfunction (i.e., poor relaxation of the heart's left ventricle) with normal systolic contraction.

=== Kidney diseases ===
SUCNR1 is expressed by various cell types in the kidneys of mice including cells in the epithelium of renal tubules, endothelial cells in the glomerulus, and macula densa (i.e., tightly packed cell areas in the ascending limb of the loop of Henle). Studies have shown that, compared to male mice who drank normal water, male mice who drank water containing 4% sodium succinate for 12 weeks developed greatly increased serum, urine, and kidney succinate levels; reduced amounts of urine output without changes in water intake; and pathological changes in their kidneys, e.g., detachment of their proximal tubule brush border epithelial cells, dilation of and urinary cast formation in their renal tubules, vacuolar degeneration (i.e., formation of non-livid vacuoles in the cytoplasm) of their renal tubular cells, and increases in the number of kidney cells dying due to apoptosis. Succinate also caused apoptosis in cultured human kidney-2 cells but its apoptosis-inducing action was greatly reduced in human kidney-2 cells that had their Sucnr1 gene knocked down. These findings, while requiring further studies including some on female mice, suggest that succinate injures kidney tissues in female mice and cultured human kidney-2 cells. This injury involves SUCNR1 activation in cultured human kidney cells.

=== Age-related macular degeneration ===
Age-related macular degeneration (AMD) is a disease of the macula (i.e., pigmented area in the center of the retina) that causes progressively increasing loses in central vision with peripheral vision remaining relatively intact (see central versus peripheral vision). By definition, the diagnosis of AMD is restricted to persons older than 55 years. AMD is divided into two forms, dry AMD characterized by the development of numerous large drusen (i.e., lipid-rich deposits that lie beneath the retinal pigment epithelium) and wet AMD characterized by the excessive growth of blood vessels (i.e. neovascularization) beneath the macula and the leakage from these vessels of blood and fluid into the central retina. Typically, AMD begins as dry AMD but at varying times thereafter may be followed by neovascularizations in and around the maucla, i.e., by its progression to wet AMD. Studies in mice showed that the expression of SUCNR1 in the retinal pigment epithelium decreased progressively with age and that Sucnr1 gene knockout mice had signs of premature sub-retinal damage similar to that in dry AMD, e.g., the accumulation of oxidized low-density lipoproteins, abnormal thickening of Bruch's membrane, and increased subretinal microglia. These findings suggest that deficiencies in SUCNR1 are a possible contributing factor to the pathogenesis of dry AMD in mice. A study of 5 patients with wet AMD showed that they had significantly higher levels of succinate in their eyes' aqueous humor than 5 patients who did not have AMD. The high levels of succinate in wet AMD may have acted to promote the development of the neovasculariztions (see Neovascularization section) which underlie the progression of dry to wet AMD. Finally, a gene analysis of 925 individuals with advanced dry AMD and 1199 AMD-free individuals revealed that there was an increased risk of developing advanced dry AMD in individuals that had single-nucleotide polymorphism variants (i.e., rs13315275) in their SUCNR1 gene. Overall, these studies suggest that SUCNR1 acts to prevent or slow the development of dry AMD in mice and humans but may promote the progression of dry to wet AMD in humans. Further studies comparing the aqueous humor succinate levels in individuals with wet AMD to non-AMD and adding studies comparing aqueous humor succinate levels of wet to dry AMD are needed to further test the hypothesis that succinate promotes the progression of dry to wet AMD.

=== Neovascularization ===
==== Retinopathy of prematurity ====
Retinopathy of prematurity (ROP) is a major cause of visual impairment and blindness in prematurely born infants who received oxygen therapy to combat their presumed low levels of retinal oxygen. Animal studies suggest that low levels of retinal oxygen increase the eye's production of succinate; the high levels of succinate activate retinal SUCNR1 which in turn stimulates neovascularization. In ROP, this retinal neovascularization is excessive, enters the aqueous humor by penetrating through the vitreous membrane that separates the aqueous humor from the retina, and causes traction on the retina, bleeding, and visual impairments including blindness. SUCNR1 is expressed by retinal pigment epithelium cells in humans and ganglion cells in rats. In a model of hypoxia-induced retinopathy of prematurity, rat pups who received oxygen therapy developed under-vascularized retinas. Succinate treatment of these rats promoted neovascularization in their under-vascularized retinas but was significantly less effective in doing so in Susnr1 gene knockdown rats. Thus, succinate-induced activation of SUCNR1 appears to be a signaling pathway that in ROP stimulates the excessive formation new blood vessels and thereby leads to visual defects. Inhibiting the activation of SUCNR1 may prove to be useful for treating infants with excessive retinal neovascularization due to ROP.

==== Diabetic retinopathy ====
Diabetic retinopathy is due at least in part to low levels of oxygen in the retina. In a model of streptozotocin-induced diabetic retinopathy, rats developed high blood glucose levels, increased levels of succinate in their retinas, retinal neovascularization, increased permeability of their retinal blood vessels, and thickening of their capillary basement membranes. These effects were significantly reduced in streptozotocin-treated mice who had the levels of SUCNRI in their eyes knocked down by the intraocular injection of lenticular virus containing shRNA directed against their Sucnr1 gene (see Delivery of shRNA). A study of rat pups that used oxygen-deprivation as a model of diabetic retinopathy likewise found that the intraocular injection of shRNA directed against the Sucnrn1 gene suppressed their development of diabetic retinopathy. Studies in humans on the role of the succinate-SUCNR1 axis in diabetic retinopathy could lead to the identification of new therapeutic strategies, i.e., the inhibition of SUCNR1 activation, to treat this disorder.

==== Vascular occlusions ====
In a model of muscle ischemia due to reduced blood flow, mice had their right hindlimb femoral artery ligated and partially resected. Following this procedure, their right quadriceps leg muscle was injected daily for 15 days with succinate or the buffered solution that carried the succinate. Compared to buffer-treated mice, succinate-treated mice had significantly higher levels of SUCNR1 in the muscles of their afflicted leg, better blood flow to the afflicted leg, and better recovery of function in their afflicted leg. Thus, succinate injections promoted the neovascularization and thereby recovery of function in the ischemia-damaged limbs of mice. In a cerebral cortex hypoxia-ischemia Rice-Vannucci model of permanent unilateral common carotid artery occlusion, 7 day old mouse pups were exposed to 8% oxygen (normal air level of oxygen is ~21%) for 90 minutes. Wild type and Sucnr1 gene-knockout mice showed a 3-fold increase in the succinate levels of the penumbra (i.e., area surrounding) the ischemic brain tissue 90 minutes after exposure to the 8% oxygen; these succinate levels returned to baseline values within the next 60 minutes. One day after exposure to 8% oxygen, wild type mice showed decreased followed in two days by increased microvascular densities in the penumbral regions whereas Sucnr1 gene knockout mice showed the decrease one day after but not the subsequent increase in penumbral vascularization. Finally, injections of succinate into the mice's cerebral ventricle reduced the size of the infarct (i.e., dead tissue) by more than 50% as determined 3 days after their exposure to low oxygen levels; the infarct size was not reduced in Sucnr1 gene knockout mice. These finding indicate that the succinate-SUCNR1 axis promotes neovascularization and thereby reduces the infarct size after vascular cerebral artery occlusion in mouse pups and suggest the therapeutic possibility that stimulating SUCNR1 may reduce the severity of vascular occlusion diseases such as strokes in humans.

=== Cancer ===
Epithelial–mesenchymal transition (EMT) is the transformation of stationary epithelial cells into mobile mesenchymal cells. Cells undergo EMT mainly when they need to be mobile such as during their embryonic development or stressful conditions such as wound healing and the need to repair a damaged tissue. However, recent studies indicate that the cells in localized epithelial cancers can similarly transform into mesenchymal-like cells and thereby attain the ability to migrate, invade adjacent tissues, and metastasize. This pro-malignant transformation may be due at least in some cases to the activation of SUCNR1 by succinate. A) Cultured Lewis lung carcinoma epithelioid mouse cells and four human epithelioid cancer cell lines, A549 lung, PC3 prostate, MCF-7 breast, and HT-29 colon cells, secreted high amounts of succinate into their culture media whereas cultures of non-malignant macrophages isolated from the peritoneal cavity of mice did not secrete detectable amounts of succinate and cultured human gastric epithelial non-malignant cells secreted relatively small amounts of succinate into their culture media. B) Succinate stimulated the migration and tissue-invasiveness of cultured Lewis lung carcinoma, A549, PD3, MCF-7, and HT-29 cells in assays of cell motility and invasiveness. C) A549 cells treated with a short hairpin RNA that knocked down their levels of SUCNR1 had significantly reduced migration responses to succinate. D) A549 cells treated with succinate showed increases in SNAI1, a transcription factor that promotes EMT. E) Metformin (which is an inhibitor of EMT) abolished the migration responses of A549 cells to succinate. F) Succinate stimulated the migration of Lewis lung carcinoma, A549, PC3, and HT-29 cells but did not do so when these cells were pretreated with an antibody that binds to and thereby blocks succinate from binding to SUCNR1. G) Mice injected subcutaneously with Lewis lung carcinoma cells had significantly higher levels of serum succinate 16 days after this injection compared to their pre-injection serum succinate levels. H) Serum succinate levels were significantly elevated in patients with lung cancer, squamous cell carcinomas of the head and neck, and the Cowden syndrome (a syndrome associated with extremely high rates of developing benign and malignant tumors). And, I) serum succinate levels are also elevated in patients with hereditary paragangliomas in the relatively uncommon cases of this disease that are caused by inactivating mutations in one of the four genes that encode for the four proteins that make up the succinate dehydrogenase heterotetrmer, i.e., the SDHD, SDHA, SDHC, and SDHB genes (inactivation of any one of these genes causes paraganglioma cells to produce excessive amounts of succinate). (Serum succinate levels are not elevated in all cancers, e.g., breast cancer patients do not show significant elevations of serum succinate; note also that MFC-7 cells do not express SUCNR1.) These studies suggest: that succinate stimulates SUCNR1 in A549 cells to transition from an epithelial to a mesenchymal phenotype and thereby increase their ability to migrate, invade tissues, and possibly metastasize; that A549, PC3, and HT-29 cells appear to also show SUCNR1-dependent EMT transformations by a SUCNR1-dependent mechanism; that paragangliomas caused by hereditary inactivating mutations in one of the four succinate dehydrogenase genes and possibly other types of cancers that overexpress succinate may be due at least in part to the activation of SUCNR1; and that high serum levels of succinate may indicate the presence of human cancers and thereby be useful markers to define the effectiveness of treating them.

=== Inflammation ===
==== Inflammatory bowel diseases ====
Studies have implicated the succinate-SUCNR1 axis in the development of inflammatory bowel diseases, i.e., Crohn's disease, ulcerative colitis, infectious cholitis, and various other causes of inflammation in the small and/or large intestines. Studies in mice reported that the only cells expressing SUCNR1 in the small intestine and colon epithelium are tuft cells and that the colon has far fewer tuft cells than the small intestine. Mice drinking water containing 100 mM succinate for 7 days developed intestinal features of type 2 inflammation similar to those evoked by intestinal parasitic worm infections, i.e., their small intestines showed increased numbers of tuft cells and increased numbers and sizes of goblet cells. Mice drinking plain water and Sucnr1 gene knockout mice drinking the succinate-containing water did not show these changes. A second study also found that succinate-containing drinking water caused an intestinal type 2 inflammation response. The study also showed that gastrointestinal infection with a Trichomoniasis parasite was sufficient to induce a type 2 inflammatory response in wild type but not in Sucnr1 gene knockout mice. However, the same experiment examining the response to the gastrointestinal roundworm, Nippostrongylus brasiliensis, found that it caused similar type 2 inflammatory responses in Sucnr1 gene knockout mice and wild type mice. In a model of 2,4,6-trinitrobenzenesulfonic acid (i.e., TNBS)-induced inflammatory bowel disease, the administration of TNBS into the rectums of mice caused within 2 days losses in body weight, shortening of colon lengths, colon histological damage (e.g., inflammatory infiltrates and disruptions of the colon's epithelial architecture), and increased colon tissue levels of SUCNR1. Most of these findings were significantly reduced in SUCNR1 gene knockout mice. These studies indicate that high levels of intestinal succinate activate SUCNR1 to produce inflammatory bowel disease-like changes in the small intestines of mice, that intestinal infections with some but not all pathogens produce SUCNR1-dependent inflammatory bowel disease, and that the TNBS model of chemical-induced colitis is also caused by succinate's activation of SUCNR1. Other studies have reported that: a) patients with Crohn's disease have higher blood plasma levels of succinate than healthy individuals; b) Crohn's disease patients with active disease have higher blood serum levels of SUCNR1 than Crohn's disease patients with inactive disease; c) Crohn's disease patients have higher levels of succinate within the small intestine and higher SUCNR1 levels in their small intestine's walls than individuals without Crohn's disease; d) Crohn's disease patients have higher levels of succinate in the fibroblasts (fibroblasts make extracellular fibrous tissue) isolated from their small intestines than the fibroblasts isolated from the small intestines of patients without inflammatory bowel disease; e) the primary fibroblasts isolated from the intestinal tissue of Crohn's disease patients had higher levels of SUCNR1 than the fibroblasts isolated from the intestines of patients without inflammatory bowel disease; f) succinate stimulated increases in the levels of SUCNR1, two markers of fibrosis (COL1a1, α-SMA), the pro-fibrotic factor TGFβ and the pro-inflammatory cytokine IL1β in primary fibroblasts isolated from patients without inflammatory disease but was far less effective in doing so when these cells had their SUCNR1 levels knocked down; and g) SUCNR1 was significantly increased in the colon tissues of patients with ulcerative colitis compared to patients without inflammatory bowel disease. These findings suggest that succinate-induced activation of SUCNR1 may promote the development of Crohn's disease and support studies to determine if succinate and SUCNR1 are similarly involved in the development of ulcerative colitis.

==== Autoimmune arthritis ====
In a murine model of autoimmune arthritis, mice were sensitized to bovine serum albumin (i.e., BSA) by injecting methylated BSA (mBSA) into two sites in the dermis of their backs 14 and 21 days after their right knee was injected with mBSA and their left knee was injected with the solution used to carry mBSA. The mBSA-injected left knees of mice became two-fold larger in size (indicating an increase in inflammation) and had three-fold higher levels of succinate in their synovial (i.e., joint) fluids) than their left knees. Further analyses suggested that the SUCNR1-expressing macrophages in these joints were activated by the rising levels of succinate to elicit inflammation and thereby joint swelling. A second study using this mBSA model found that mBSA-treated mouse knee joints developed hyperalgesia and high numbers of inflammation-inducing neutrophils whereas the mBSA-treated joints of SUCNR1 gene knockout mice did not develop hyperalgesia and had significantly fewer neutrophils. Rheumatoid arthritis is an autoimmune arthritis characterized by symmetric arthritis typically involving the small joints of the hands and feet but also commonly involving arthritis in larger joints and inflammation in a wide range of other tissues such as the lung, gastrointestinal tract, heart (e.g., dysfunction of the heart's microvasculature), and oral cavity. Patients with rheumatoid arthritis have high levels of succinate in the synovial fluid of their inflamed joins and increased numbers of SUCNR1-expressing dendritic cells in the synovial membranes of these joints as well as some lymph nodes. These findings suggest that the succinate-induced activation of SUCNR1 contributes to the development of at least one form of arthritis in mice and may play a similar role in human rheumatoid arthritis. The studies also support further studies to determine if activated SUCNR1 promotes human rheumatoid arthritis.
