= Quinacridone =

Organic compound used as a pigment

Names
- Preferred IUPAC name 5,12-Dihydroquinolino[2,3-b]acridine-7,14-dione
- Other names C.I.: 73900, Pigment Violet 19

Identifiers
CAS Number	1047-16-1
3D model (JSmol)	Interactive image
ChemSpider	13369
ECHA InfoCard	100.012.618
EC Number	213-879-2
PubChem CID	13976
UNII	11P487375P
CompTox Dashboard (EPA)	DTXSID5027354
- InChI: InChI=1S/C20H12N2O2/c23-19-11-5-1-3-7-15(11)21-17-10-14-18(9-13(17)19)22-16-8-4-2-6-12(16)20(14)24/h1-10H,(H,21,23)(H,22,24) Key: NRCMAYZCPIVABH-UHFFFAOYSA-N; InChI=1/C20H12N2O2/c23-19-11-5-1-3-7-15(11)21-17-10-14-18(9-13(17)19)22-16-8-4-2-6-12(16)20(14)24/h1-10H,(H,21,23)(H,22,24) Key: NRCMAYZCPIVABH-UHFFFAOYAK
- SMILES: O=C4c5ccccc5Nc3cc2C(=O)c1c(cccc1)Nc2cc34

Properties
Chemical formula	C_{20}H_{12}N_{2}O_{2}
Molar mass	312.328 g·mol^{−1}
Appearance	Red powder (nanoparticles)
Density	1.47 g/cm^{3}
Solubility in water	Insoluble
- Except where otherwise noted, data are given for materials in their standard state (at 25 °C [77 °F], 100 kPa). verify (what is ?) Infobox references

Quinacridone is an organic compound used as a pigment. Numerous derivatives constitute the quinacridone pigment family, which finds extensive use in industrial colorant applications such as robust outdoor paints, inkjet printer ink, tattoo inks, artists' watercolor paints, and color laser printer toner. As pigments, the quinacridones are insoluble. The development of this family of pigments supplanted the alizarin dyes.

== Synthesis ==
The name indicates that the compounds are a fusion of acridone and quinoline, although they are not made that way. Classically the parent is prepared from the 2,5-dianilide of terephthalic acid (C_{6}H_{2}(NHPh)_{2}(CO_{2}H)_{2}). Condensation of succinosuccinate esters with aniline followed by cyclization affords dihydroquinacridone, which are readily dehydrogenated. The latter is oxidized to quinacridone. Derivatives of quinacridone can be readily obtained by employing substituted anilines. Linear cis-Quinacridones can be prepared from isophthalic acid.

== Derivatives ==
Isomers of quinacridone
Linear trans-Isomer
Linear cis-Isomer
Angular cis-Isomer
Angular trans-Isomer

Quinacridone-based pigments are used to make high performance paints. Quinacridones were first sold as pigments by Du Pont in 1958. Quinacridones are considered "high performance" pigments because they have exceptional color and weather fastness. Major uses for quinacridones include automobile and industrial coatings. Nanocrystalline dispersions of quinacridone pigments functionalized with solubilizing surfactants are the most common magenta printing ink.

Typically deep red to violet in color, the hue of quinacridone is affected not only by the R-groups on the molecule but by the crystal form of the solid. For example, the γ crystal modification of unsubstituted quinacridone provides a strong red shade that has excellent color fastness and resistance to solvation. Another important modification is the β phase which provides a maroon shade that is also more weather resistant and light-fast. Both crystal modifications are more thermodynamically stable than the α crystal phase. The γ crystal modification is characterized by a criss-cross lattice where each quinacridone molecule hydrogen-bonds to four neighbors via single H-bonds. The β phase, meanwhile, consists of linear chains of molecules with double H-bonds between each quinacridone molecule and two neighbors.

Basic modifications to the chemical structure of quinacridones include the addition of CH_{3} and Cl substituents. Some magenta shades of quinacridone are labeled under the proprietary name "Thio Violet" and "Acra Violet".

== Semiconductor properties ==
Quinacridone derivatives exhibit intense fluorescence in the dispersed state, and high carrier mobility. These properties complement good photo-, thermal, and electrochemical stability. These properties are desired for optoelectronic applications including organic light-emitting diodes (OLEDs), organic solar cells (OSCs), and organic field-effect transistors (OFETs). Due to interplay of intermolecular H-bonding and pi-pi stacking, quinacridone can form a self-assembling, supramolecular organic semiconductor.

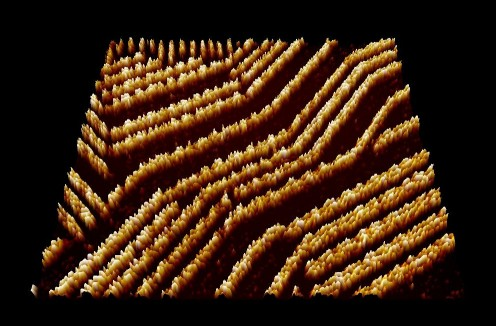
Taken by a scanning tunneling microscope, self-assembled quinacridone chains on a graphite background.

== Additional reading ==
- Chenguang, Wang; Zuolun, Zhang; Yue, Wang (2016). "Quinacridone-based π-conjugated electronic materials". J. Mater. Chem. C. 4 (42): 9918–36. doi:10.1039/C6TC03621J.
- Głowacki, Eric Daniel; Irimia-Vladu, Mihai; Kaltenbrunner, Martin; Gsiorowski, Jacek; White, Matthew S.; Monkowius, Uwe; Romanazzi, Giuseppe; Suranna, Gian Paolo; Mastrorilli, Piero; Sekitani, Tsuyoshi; Bauer, Siegfried; Someya, Takao; Torsi, Luisa; Sarıçiftçi, Niyazi Serdar (2013). "Hydrogen-Bonded Semiconducting Pigments for Air-Stable Field-Effect Transistors". Advanced Materials. 25 (11): 1563–9. Bibcode:2013AdM....25.1563G. doi:10.1002/adma.201204039. PMID 23239229. S2CID 205247943.
