= Ramatroban =

Chemical compound

Clinical data
- Trade names: Baynas
- AHFS/Drugs.com: International Drug Names
- Routes of administration: Oral (tablets)
- ATC code: None

Legal status
- Legal status: Rx-only (JP)

Identifiers
- IUPAC name: 3-((3R)-3-{[(4-fluorophenyl)sulfonyl]amino}-1,2,3,4-tetrahydro-9H-carbazol-9-yl)propanoic acid
- CAS Number: 116649-85-5
- PubChem CID: 123879
- IUPHAR/BPS: 1910
- ChemSpider: 110413
- UNII: P1ALI72U6C
- KEGG: D01128
- ChEMBL: ChEMBL361812
- CompTox Dashboard (EPA): DTXSID1046685
- ECHA InfoCard: 100.159.668

Chemical and physical data
- Formula: C_{21}H_{21}FN_{2}O_{4}S
- Molar mass: 416.47 g·mol^{−1}
- 3D model (JSmol): Interactive image
- SMILES: C1CC2=C(CC1NS(=O)(=O)C3=CC=C(C=C3)F)C4=CC=CC=C4N2CCC(=O)O
- InChI: InChI=1S/C21H21FN2O4S/c22-14-5-8-16(9-6-14)29(27,28)23-15-7-10-20-18(13-15)17-3-1-2-4-19(17)24(20)12-11-21(25)26/h1-6,8-9,15,23H,7,10-13H2,(H,25,26)/t15-/m1/s1; Key:LDXDSHIEDAPSSA-OAHLLOKOSA-N

Ramatroban (INN; also known as BAY u3405) is a thromboxane receptor antagonist. It is also a DP_{2} receptor antagonist.

Ramatroban is indicated for the treatment of coronary artery disease. It has also been used for the treatment of asthma.

It has been suggested that ramatroban, by modulating DP_{2} receptor, can reverse viremia-associated proinflammatory and prothrombotic processes which are similar to those induced by SARS-Cov-2. Hence, ramatroban, that has been used for the treatment of allergic rhinitis in Japan for the past two decades with a well established safety profile, merits investigation as a novel immunotherapy for the treatment of COVID-19 disease, although no clinical trial has yet been conducted.

Ramatroban was developed by the German pharmaceutical company Bayer AG and is co-marketed in Japan by Bayer Yakuhin then marketed by Kyorin Pharmaceutical and Nippon Shinyaku Co., Ltd. under the trade name Baynas.

It is a tetrahydrocarbazolamine derivative and cyclized tryptamine.

== Synthesis ==
The synthesis has been described: Cmp#4 Patent:

The starting material is called 1,4-cyclohexanedione monoethylene glycol ketal aka 1,4-Dioxaspiro[4.5]decan-8-one [4746-97-8]. The Borsche–Drechsel cyclization between (1) and Phenylhydrazine gives 5-Oxo-tetrahydrocarbazole ethylene ketal [54621-12-4] (2). Hydrolysis of the ketal protecting group gives 1,2,4,9-tetrahydrocarbazol-3-one [51145-61-0] (3). Reduction of the ketone with sodium borohydride gives 2,3,4,9-tetrahydro-1H-carbazol-3-ol [14384-34-0] (4). Acetylation by treatment with vinyl acetate [108-05-4] gives (3R)-3beta-Acetoxy-1,2,3,4-tetrahydro-9H-carbazole, PC59051734 (5a) & (3S)-1,2,3,4-Tetrahydro-9H-carbazole-3-ol, PC8142712 (5b). These can be separated at this stage into pure (S) for the next step. A Mitsunobu reaction in the presence of DPPA leads to an Azide with pure Walden inversion kinetics w/o racemization. The Staudinger reduction of the azide in situ gives (R)-3-Amino-1,2,3,4-tetrahydrocarbazole [874-937-6] [116650-33-0] (6).

== See also ==
- Ciclindole
