= Tetrahydrocarbazole =

Names
- IUPAC name 2,3,4,9-tetrahydro-1H-carbazole
- Other names 1,2,3,4-Tetrahydrocarbazole

Identifiers
| CAS Number | 942-01-8 |
| 3D model (JSmol) | Interactive image |
| ChEMBL | ChEMBL1911317 |
| ChemSpider | 13075 |
| ECHA InfoCard | 100.012.168 |
| EC Number | 213-385-7 |
| PubChem CID | 13664 |
| UNII | 8ZLK0TSX93 |
| CompTox Dashboard (EPA) | DTXSID00240969 |
- InChI: InChI=1S/C12H13N/c1-3-7-11-9(5-1)10-6-2-4-8-12(10)13-11/h1,3,5,7,13H,2,4,6,8H2 Key: XKLNOVWDVMWTOB-UHFFFAOYSA-N
- SMILES: C1CCC2=C(C1)C3=CC=CC=C3N2
- Except where otherwise noted, data are given for materials in their standard state (at 25 °C [77 °F], 100 kPa). Infobox references

Tetrahydrocarbazole is a heterocyclic compound featuring a fused structure composed of a five-membered pyrrole ring, a benzene ring, and a cyclohexane ring, making it a partially saturated derivative of carbazole. This molecular framework is commonly found in natural products and serves as a scaffold in medicinal chemistry due to its diverse pharmacological activities, including antimicrobial, anticancer, antipsychotic, and anti-inflammatory properties.

Examples of drugs that contain the tetrahydrocarbazole ring system include ondansetron and ramatroban.
