= Stobbe condensation =

Chemical reaction

The Stobbe condensation entails the reaction of an aldehyde or ketone with an ester of succinic acid to generate alkylidene succinic acid or related derivatives. The reaction consumes one equivalent of metal alkoxide. Commonly, diethylsuccinate is a component of the reaction. The usual product is salt of the half-ester. The Stobbe condensation is named after its discoverer, Hans Stobbe, whose work involved the sodium ethoxide-induced condensation of acetone and diethyl succinate.

An example is the reaction of benzophenone with diethyl succinate:

A reaction mechanism that explains the formation of both an ester group and a carboxylic acid group is centered on a lactone intermediate (5):

Reaction mechanism

== Applications ==
The Stobbe condensation is also illustrated in the synthesis of some drugs:

1. Pridefine
2. Doisynoestrol
3. Tametraline
4. Sertraline (discovery route)
5. Pregabalin (discovery route c.f. [51615-30-6])
6. Y-39677 [312688-85-0]
7. Splitomicin

== See also ==
- Aldol condensation
- Polyketide synthase
- Dieckmann condensation
- Claisen condensation
