= Metralindole =

Chemical compound

Clinical data
- Routes of administration: Oral
- Drug class: Monoamine oxidase inhibitor (MAOI); Reversible inhibitor of MAO-A (RIMA)
- ATC code: None

Legal status
- Legal status: In general: ℞ (Prescription only)

Identifiers
- IUPAC name: 2,4,5,6-tetrahydro-9-methoxy-4-methyl-1H-3,4,6a-triazafluoranthene
- CAS Number: 54188-38-4; HCl: 53734-79-5
- PubChem CID: 68713
- ChemSpider: 61964
- UNII: 2QW3FL6OPA; HCl: M15TM76Y3L
- CompTox Dashboard (EPA): DTXSID0045705

Chemical and physical data
- Formula: C_{15}H_{17}N_{3}O
- Molar mass: 255.321 g·mol^{−1}
- 3D model (JSmol): Interactive image
- SMILES: CN1CCN2C3=C(C=C(C=C3)OC)C4=C2C1=NCC4

Metralindole (Inkazan) is a reversible inhibitor of monoamine oxidase A (RIMA) which was investigated in Russia as a potential antidepressant. It is structurally and pharmacologically related to pirlindole.

== See also ==
- Substituted β-carboline § Related compounds
- Pirlindole
- Tetrindole
- List of Russian drugs
