= Diethyl succinate =

Names
- Preferred IUPAC name Diethyl butanedioate
- Other names Diethyl succinate Butanedioic acid diethyl ester Clorius

Identifiers
CAS Number	123-25-1
3D model (JSmol)	Interactive image
Beilstein Reference	907645
ChemSpider	13865630
ECHA InfoCard	100.004.194
PubChem CID	31249
RTECS number	WM7400000
UNII	ELP55C13DR
CompTox Dashboard (EPA)	DTXSID601022558 DTXSID2038732, DTXSID601022558
- InChI: InChI=1/C8H14O4/c1-3-11-7(9)5-6-8(10)12-4-2/h3-6H2,1-2H3
- SMILES: CCOC(=0)CCC(=0)OCC

Properties
Chemical formula	C_{8}H_{14}O_{4}
Molar mass	174.196 g·mol^{−1}
Appearance	Colorless liquid
Density	1.047 g/mL
Melting point	−20 °C (−4 °F; 253 K)
Boiling point	218 °C (424 °F; 491 K)
Solubility in water	Slightly soluble
Vapor pressure	0.13 mmHg
Magnetic susceptibility (χ)	−105.07·10^{−6} cm^{3}/mol

Thermochemistry
Std enthalpy of combustion (Δ_{c}H^{⦵}_{298})	24.22 kJ/g

Hazards
- Occupational safety and health (OHS/OSH)
Main hazards	Primary irritant
NFPA 704 (fire diamond)	1 1 0
Flash point	90.56 °C (195.01 °F; 363.71 K)
Explosive limits	1.1-6.5%
- Except where otherwise noted, data are given for materials in their standard state (at 25 °C [77 °F], 100 kPa). Infobox references

Diethyl succinate is the diethyl ester of succinate.

It is a colorless liquid with the formula (CH_{2}CO_{2}Et)_{2} (Et = ethyl). The organic molecule contains two ester groups. This ester is a versatile chemical intermediate. A colorless liquid, diethyl succinate is formed by Fischer esterification of succinic acid and ethanol.

== Reactions ==
Being a diester, diethyl succinate is a particularly versatile building block. It participates in acyloin condensation to give 2-hydroxycyclobutanone. Via condensation with oxalate esters, it serves as a precursor to ketoglutaric acid. It is a reagent in the Stobbe condensation.

Diethylsuccinoylsuccinate, a useful precursor to dyes and pigments, is produced by base-induced condensation of diethyl succinate.
