= Flucindole =

Chemical compound

Clinical data
- Other names: WIN-35150; WIN35150; WIN-35,150; 5,7-Difluoro-N,N-dimethyl-α,2-dimethylene-tryptamine
- Routes of administration: Oral
- ATC code: none

Legal status
- Legal status: In general: uncontrolled

Identifiers
- IUPAC name: 6,8-Difluoro-N,N-dimethyl-2,3,4,9-tetrishydro-1H-carbazol-3-amine
- CAS Number: 40594-09-0
- PubChem CID: 38531
- ChemSpider: 35315
- UNII: 5CYU0D0S8M
- KEGG: D02658
- ChEMBL: ChEMBL1882682
- CompTox Dashboard (EPA): DTXSID40866001

Chemical and physical data
- Formula: C_{14}H_{16}F_{2}N_{2}
- Molar mass: 250.293 g·mol^{−1}
- 3D model (JSmol): Interactive image
- SMILES: CN(C)C1CCC2=C(C1)C3=CC(=CC(=C3N2)F)F
- InChI: InChI=1S/C14H16F2N2/c1-18(2)9-3-4-13-10(7-9)11-5-8(15)6-12(16)14(11)17-13/h5-6,9,17H,3-4,7H2,1-2H3; Key:FXNCRITWFOVSEP-UHFFFAOYSA-N

Flucindole (INN, USAN; developmental code name WIN-35150) is an antipsychotic of the tetrahydrocarbazolamine family with a tricyclic cyclized tryptamine structure that was never marketed. It is the 6,8-difluoro derivative of ciclindole. The drug is about 5 to 10 times more potent than ciclindole both in vitro and in vivo.

== See also ==
- Tetrahydrocarbazolamine
- Cyclized tryptamine
- 5-Fluoro-AMT
- Iprindole
