= LY-344864 =

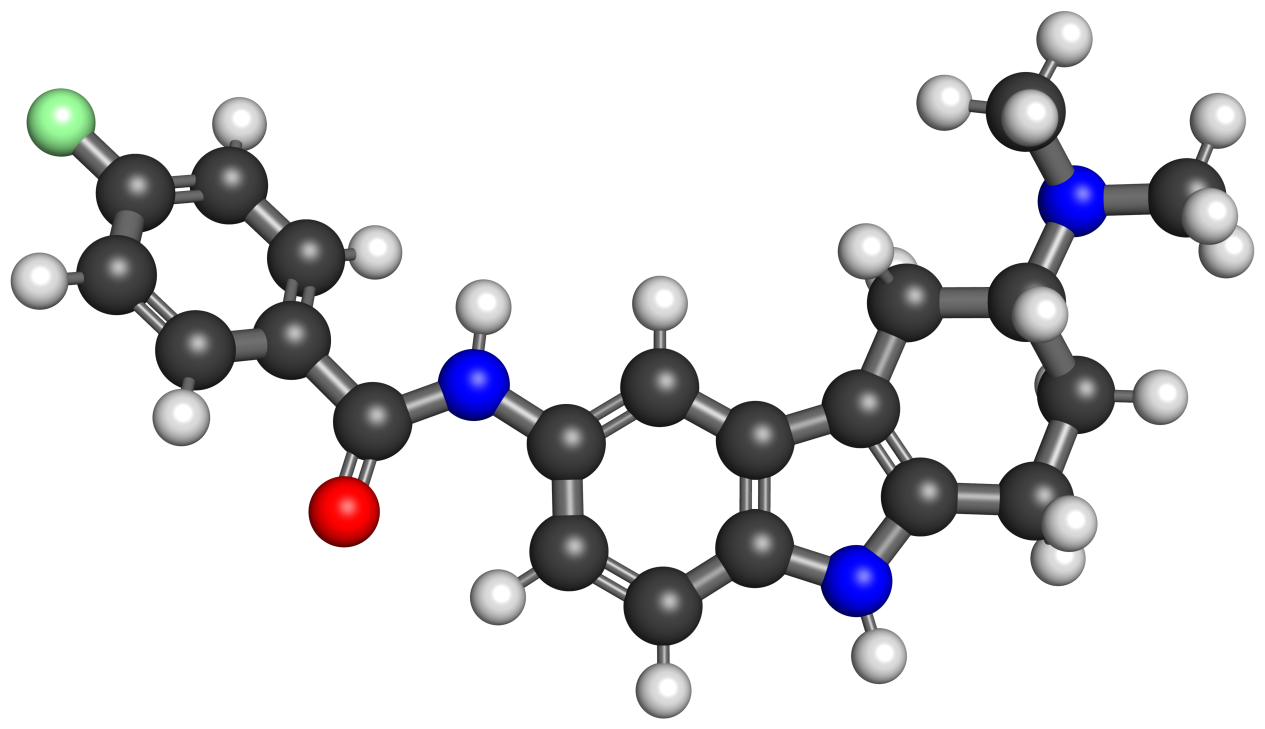

Clinical data
- Other names: LY344864; LY-344,864

Identifiers
- IUPAC name: N-[(6R)-6-(dimethylamino)-6,7,8,9-tetrahydro-5H-carbazol-3-yl]-4-fluorobenzamide
- CAS Number: 186544-26-3
- PubChem CID: 5311097
- IUPHAR/BPS: 21
- ChemSpider: 4470627
- UNII: L4WN6HH63L
- ChEBI: CHEBI:93683
- ChEMBL: ChEMBL1628565
- CompTox Dashboard (EPA): DTXSID201134040

Chemical and physical data
- Formula: C_{21}H_{22}FN_{3}O
- Molar mass: 351.425 g·mol^{−1}
- 3D model (JSmol): Interactive image
- SMILES: CN(C)[C@@H]1CCC2=C(C1)C3=C(N2)C=CC(=C3)NC(=O)C4=CC=C(C=C4)F
- InChI: InChI=1S/C21H22FN3O/c1-25(2)16-8-10-20-18(12-16)17-11-15(7-9-19(17)24-20)23-21(26)13-3-5-14(22)6-4-13/h3-7,9,11,16,24H,8,10,12H2,1-2H3,(H,23,26)/t16-/m1/s1; Key:GKWHICIUSVVNGX-MRXNPFEDSA-N

LY-344864 is an experimental drug of the triptan and tetrahydrocarbazolamine families with a tricyclic cyclized tryptamine structure which acts as an agonist for the 5-HT_{1F} serotonin receptor. It has antimigraine activity in animal models but was never developed for this indication as a medicine, however it continues to be used in scientific research and in recent years has been investigated as a potential agent for stimulating mitochondrial biogenesis, which can facilitate repair to damaged cells and tissues with a number of potential medical applications.

== See also ==
- Tetrahydrocarbazolamine
- Cyclized tryptamine
- Frovatriptan
