= Ciclindole =

Chemical compound

Clinical data
- Other names: WIN-27,147-2; WIN-27147-2; WIN27147-2
- Routes of administration: Oral
- ATC code: None

Legal status
- Legal status: In general: uncontrolled

Identifiers
- IUPAC name: N,N-dimethyl-2,3,4,9-tetrahydro-1H-carbazol-3-amine
- CAS Number: 32211-97-5
- PubChem CID: 36082
- ChemSpider: 33189
- UNII: CXJ7G6BYD7
- KEGG: D03619
- ChEMBL: ChEMBL2104160
- CompTox Dashboard (EPA): DTXSID10865627

Chemical and physical data
- Formula: C_{14}H_{18}N_{2}
- Molar mass: 214.312 g·mol^{−1}
- 3D model (JSmol): Interactive image
- SMILES: c21c(cccc1)[nH]c3c2CC(N(C)C)CC3

Ciclindole (INN; developmental code name WIN-27,147-2), also known as cyclindole (USAN), is an antipsychotic of the tetrahydrocarbazolamine family with a tricyclic cyclized tryptamine structure that was never marketed.

It displaces spiperone binding in vitro and elevates dopamine levels in the striatum, indicating that it acts as a dopamine D_{2} receptor antagonist. It also shows apparent affinity for the α_{1}-adrenergic receptor, the serotonin S_{1} receptor, and the serotonin S_{2} receptor. However, its affinities for all of the preceding targets are weak, in the low micromolar range.

The related drug flucindole is about 5 to 10 times more potent than ciclindole both in vitro and in vivo.

== See also ==
- Tetrahydrocarbazolamine
- Cyclized tryptamine
- Frovatriptan
- α,N,N-Trimethyltryptamine
- Iprindole
