= Tetrindole =

Chemical compound

Clinical data
- ATC code: None

Identifiers
- IUPAC name: 2,3,3a,4,5,6-hexahydro-8-cyclohexyl-1H-pyrazino[3,2,1-j,k]carbazole
- CAS Number: 170964-67-7
- PubChem CID: 160020
- ChemSpider: 140675
- UNII: 978VSV87L6
- ChEBI: CHEBI:77799
- ChEMBL: ChEMBL4303571

Chemical and physical data
- Formula: C_{20}H_{26}N_{2}
- Molar mass: 294.442 g·mol^{−1}
- 3D model (JSmol): Interactive image
- SMILES: C1CCC(CC1)C2=CC3=C(C=C2)N4CCNC5C4=C3CCC5
- InChI: InChI=1S/C20H26N2/c1-2-5-14(6-3-1)15-9-10-19-17(13-15)16-7-4-8-18-20(16)22(19)12-11-21-18/h9-10,13-14,18,21H,1-8,11-12H2; Key:AUXCHYJDVJZEPG-UHFFFAOYSA-N

Tetrindole was a drug candidate that functions by reversibly inhibiting monoamine oxidase A; it was first synthesized in Moscow in the early 1990s. Tetrindole is similar in its chemical structure to pirlindole (Pyrazidol), and metralindole.

== See also ==
- Substituted β-carboline § Related compounds
- List of Russian drugs
