= 1,2-Cyclohexanedione =

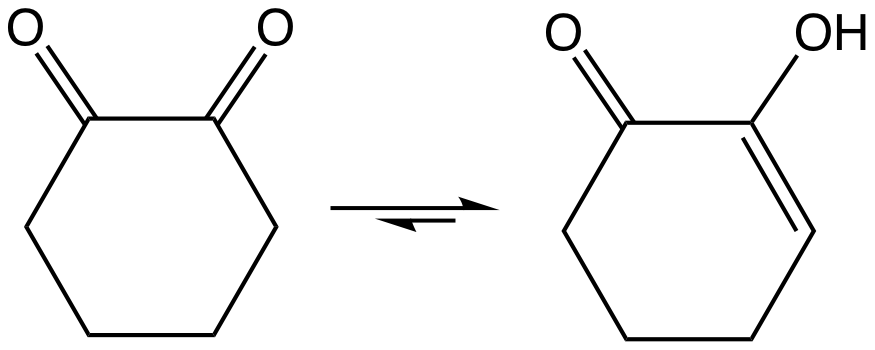

Names
- Preferred IUPAC name Cyclohexane-1,2-dione

Identifiers
CAS Number	765-87-7
3D model (JSmol)	Interactive image
ChemSpider	12465
ECHA InfoCard	100.011.050
PubChem CID	13006
UNII	75C1OVW0FJ
CompTox Dashboard (EPA)	DTXSID6061101
- InChI: InChI=1S/C6H8O2/c7-5-3-1-2-4-6(5)8/h1-4H2 Key: OILAIQUEIWYQPH-UHFFFAOYSA-N
- SMILES: C1CCC(=O)C(=O)C1

Properties
Chemical formula	C_{6}H_{8}O_{2}
Molar mass	112.128 g·mol^{−1}
Appearance	white, waxy solid
Density	1.1305 g/cm^{3}
Melting point	40 °C
Boiling point	194 °C
- Except where otherwise noted, data are given for materials in their standard state (at 25 °C [77 °F], 100 kPa). Infobox references

1,2-Cyclohexanedione is an organic compound with the formula (CH_{2})_{4}(CO)_{2}. It is one of three isomeric cyclohexanediones. It is a colorless compound that is soluble in a variety of organic solvents. It can be prepared by oxidation of cyclohexanone by selenium dioxide. The enol is about 1 kcal/mol more stable than the diketo form.

Numerous diimine and dioxime ligands have been prepared from this diketone. It also condenses with 1,2-diamines to give diaza heterocycles.
