= (Histone-H3)-lysine-36 demethylase =

Class of enzymes

Identifiers
- EC no.: 1.14.11.27

Databases
- BRENDA: enzyme data
- ExPASy: NiceZyme view
- KEGG: enzyme entry
- MetaCyc: metabolic pathway
- Rhea: reactions
- PDB structures: RCSB PDB PDBe PDBsum
Search
- PMC: articles
- PubMed: articles
- NCBI: proteins

(Histone-H3)-lysine-36 demethylase (EC 1.14.11.27, JHDM1A, JmjC domain-containing histone demethylase 1A, H3-K36-specific demethylase, histone-lysine (H3-K36) demethylase, histone demethylase, protein-6-N,6-N-dimethyl-L-lysine,2-oxoglutarate:oxygen oxidoreductase) is an enzyme with systematic name protein-N6,N6-dimethyl-L-lysine,2-oxoglutarate:oxygen oxidoreductase. This enzyme catalyses the following chemical reaction

protein N6,N6-dimethyl-L-lysine + 2 2-oxoglutarate + 2 O_{2} $\rightleftharpoons$ protein L-lysine + 2 succinate + 2 formaldehyde + 2 CO_{2} (overall reaction)
(1a) protein N6,N6-dimethyl-L-lysine + 2-oxoglutarate + O_{2} $\rightleftharpoons$ protein N6-methyl-L-lysine + succinate + formaldehyde + CO_{2}
(1b) protein N6-methyl-L-lysine + 2-oxoglutarate + O2 $\rightleftharpoons$ protein L-lysine + succinate + formaldehyde + CO_{2}

(Histone-H3)-lysine-36 demethylase contains iron(II).
