= Cyclohexanedione =

Cyclohexanedione may refer to:

- 1,2-Cyclohexanedione
- 1,3-Cyclohexanedione
- 1,4-Cyclohexanedione
