= Frovatriptan =

Chemical compound

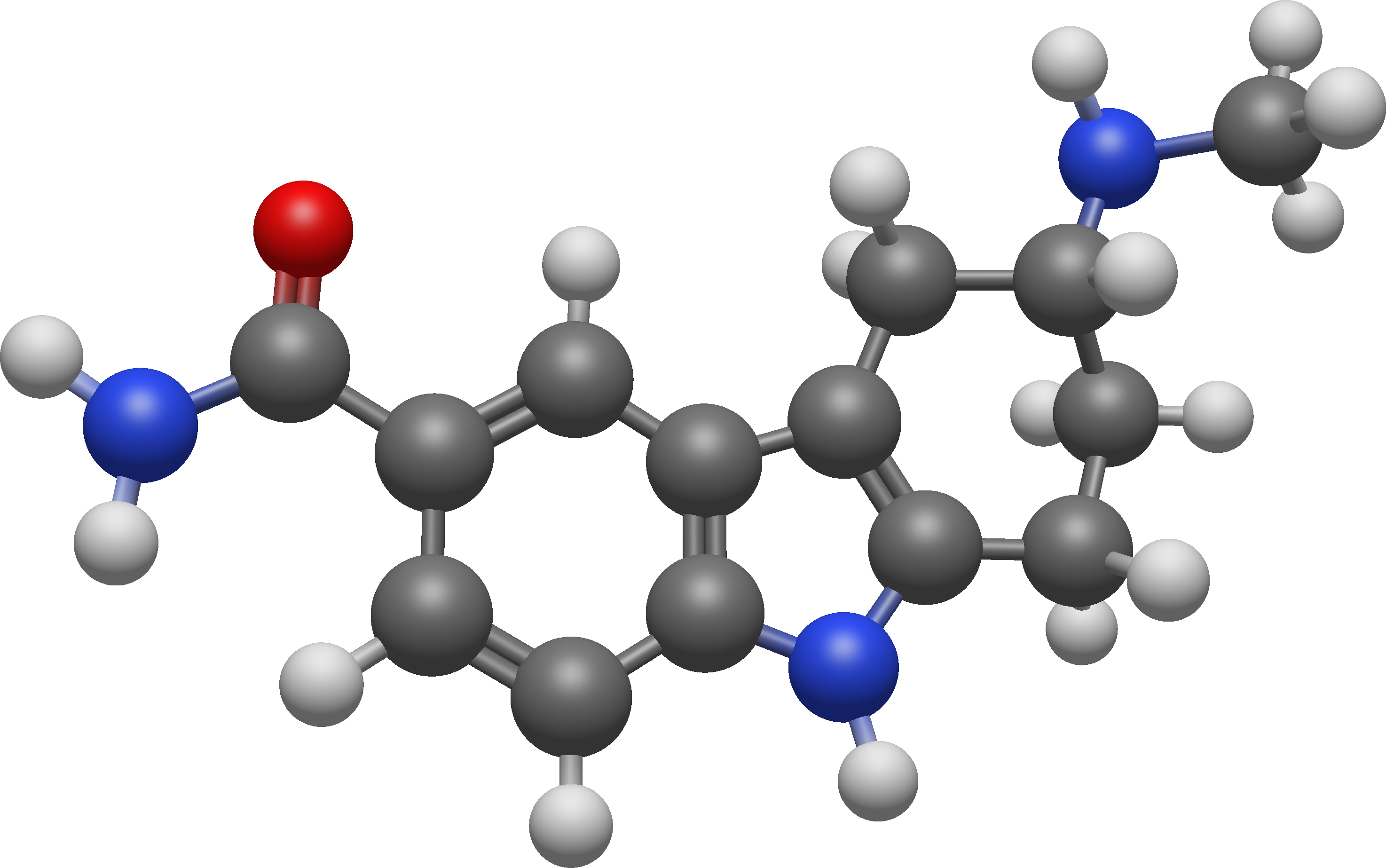

Clinical data
- Trade names: Frova
- Other names: SB-209509; SB209509; EN-3266; EN3266; VML-251; VML251
- AHFS/Drugs.com: Monograph
- MedlinePlus: a604013
- License data: US DailyMed: Frovatriptan
- Pregnancy category: AU: B3
- Routes of administration: Oral
- Drug class: Serotonin 5-HT_{1B}, 5-HT_{1D}, 5-HT_{1F}, and 5-HT_{7} receptor agonist
- ATC code: N02CC07 (WHO)

Legal status
- Legal status: CA: ℞-only; US: ℞-only

Pharmacokinetic data
- Bioavailability: 20–30%
- Metabolism: Liver
- Elimination half-life: 26–30 hours
- Excretion: Kidney

Identifiers
- IUPAC name: (+)-(R)-3-Methylamino-6-carboxamido-1,2,3,4-tetrahydrocarbazole
- CAS Number: 158747-02-5; succinate: 158930-17-7
- PubChem CID: 77992
- IUPHAR/BPS: 7191
- DrugBank: DB00998
- ChemSpider: 70378
- UNII: H82Q2D5WA7; succinate: D28J6W18HY
- KEGG: D07997
- ChEMBL: ChEMBL1279
- CompTox Dashboard (EPA): DTXSID0023080

Chemical and physical data
- Formula: C_{14}H_{17}N_{3}O
- Molar mass: 243.310 g·mol^{−1}
- 3D model (JSmol): Interactive image
- SMILES: CN[C@@H]3CCc2[nH]c1ccc(C(N)=O)cc1c2C3
- InChI: InChI=1S/C14H17N3O/c1-16-9-3-5-13-11(7-9)10-6-8(14(15)18)2-4-12(10)17-13/h2,4,6,9,16-17H,3,5,7H2,1H3,(H2,15,18)/t9-/m1/s1; Key:XPSQPHWEGNHMSK-SECBINFHSA-N

Frovatriptan, sold under the brand name Frova among others, is a triptan medication developed by Vernalis for the treatment of migraine headaches and for short term prevention of menstrual migraine. The product is licensed to Endo Pharmaceuticals in North America and Menarini in Europe.

== Medical uses ==
Frovatriptan is used in the treatment of migraine.

=== Available forms ===
It is available as 2.5 mg tablets.

== Contraindications ==
Frovatriptan should not be given to patients with:

- Ischemic heart disease
- Cerebrovascular syndrome
- Peripheral vascular disease
- Uncontrolled hypertension
- Hemiplegic or basilar migraine

== Side effects ==
Rare, but serious cardiac events have been reported in patients with risk factors predictive of CAD. These include: coronary artery vasospasm, transient myocardial ischemia, myocardial infarction, ventricular tachycardia and ventricular fibrillation.

== Pharmacology ==
=== Pharmacodynamics ===
Frovatriptan activities
Target	Affinity (K_{i}, nM)
5-HT_{1A}	50–62 (K_{i}); 759–>10,000 (EC_{50}); 38% (E_{max})
5-HT_{1B}	2.5–46 (K_{i}); 6.3–20 (EC_{50}); 92% (E_{max})
5-HT_{1D}	1.7–10 (K_{i}); 2–5 (EC_{50}); 98% (E_{max})
5-HT_{1E}	>1,000 (K_{i}); 6,610–>10,000 (EC_{50}); 44% (E_{max})
5-HT_{1F}	63–120 (K_{i}); 79–447 (EC_{50}); 46% (E_{max})
5-HT_{2A}	>10,000 (K_{i}) >10,000 (EC_{50})
5-HT_{2B}	>10,000 (K_{i}) >10,000 (EC_{50})
5-HT_{2C}	>5,000 (K_{i}); ND (EC_{50})
5-HT_{3}	>1,000 (mouse/rat)
5-HT_{4}	ND
5-HT_{5A}	ND
5-HT_{6}	ND
5-HT_{7}	107–200 (K_{i}); 38 (EC_{50})
α_{1}	>10,000 (rat)
α_{1A}–α_{1D}	ND
α_{2A}–α_{2C}	ND
β_{1}–β_{3}	ND
D_{1}	>10,000
D_{2}	>10,000
D_{3}	>10,000
D_{4}–D_{5}	ND
H_{1}	>10,000 (guinea pig)
H_{2}–H_{4}	ND
M_{1}–M_{5}	ND
I_{1}, I_{2}	ND
σ_{1}, σ_{2}	ND
TAAR1	ND
SERT	ND
NET	ND
DAT	ND
Notes: The smaller the value, the more avidly the drug binds to the site. All proteins are human unless otherwise specified. Refs:

Frovatriptan is a serotonin receptor agonist, with high affinity for the serotonin 5-HT_{1B} and 5-HT_{1D} receptors and with weaker activity at the serotonin 5-HT_{1F} receptor. It has no significant effects on the GABA_{A} mediated channel activity and benzodiazepine binding sites. Frovatriptan inhibits excessive dilation of arteries that supply blood to the head. Uniquely among most triptans, frovatriptan is also a relatively potent serotonin 5-HT_{7} receptor agonist. It is inactive at the serotonin 5-HT_{2A} and 5-HT_{2B} receptors.

=== Pharmacokinetics ===
Frovatriptan has a terminal elimination half-life of approximately 26 hours, making it the longest within its class.

== Chemistry ==
Frovatriptan's chemical structure is unusual among triptans, with other triptans being simple tryptamines or closely related compounds but frovatriptan instead being a tricyclic cyclized tryptamine and tetrahydrocarbazolamine derivative. It can be thought of as a 5-substituted and side chain-cyclized derivative of N-methyltryptamine (NMT).

The experimental log P of frovatriptan is 0.9 and its predicted log P is 1.2.

== History ==
Frovatriptan was first described in the scientific literature by 1997. It was approved for medical use in the United States in 2001.

== Society and culture ==
=== Legal status ===
Frovatriptan is available only by prescription in the United States and Canada.

== See also ==
- Triptan
- Tetrahydrocarbazolamine
- LY-344864
