= 5-MeO-AET =

Chemical compound

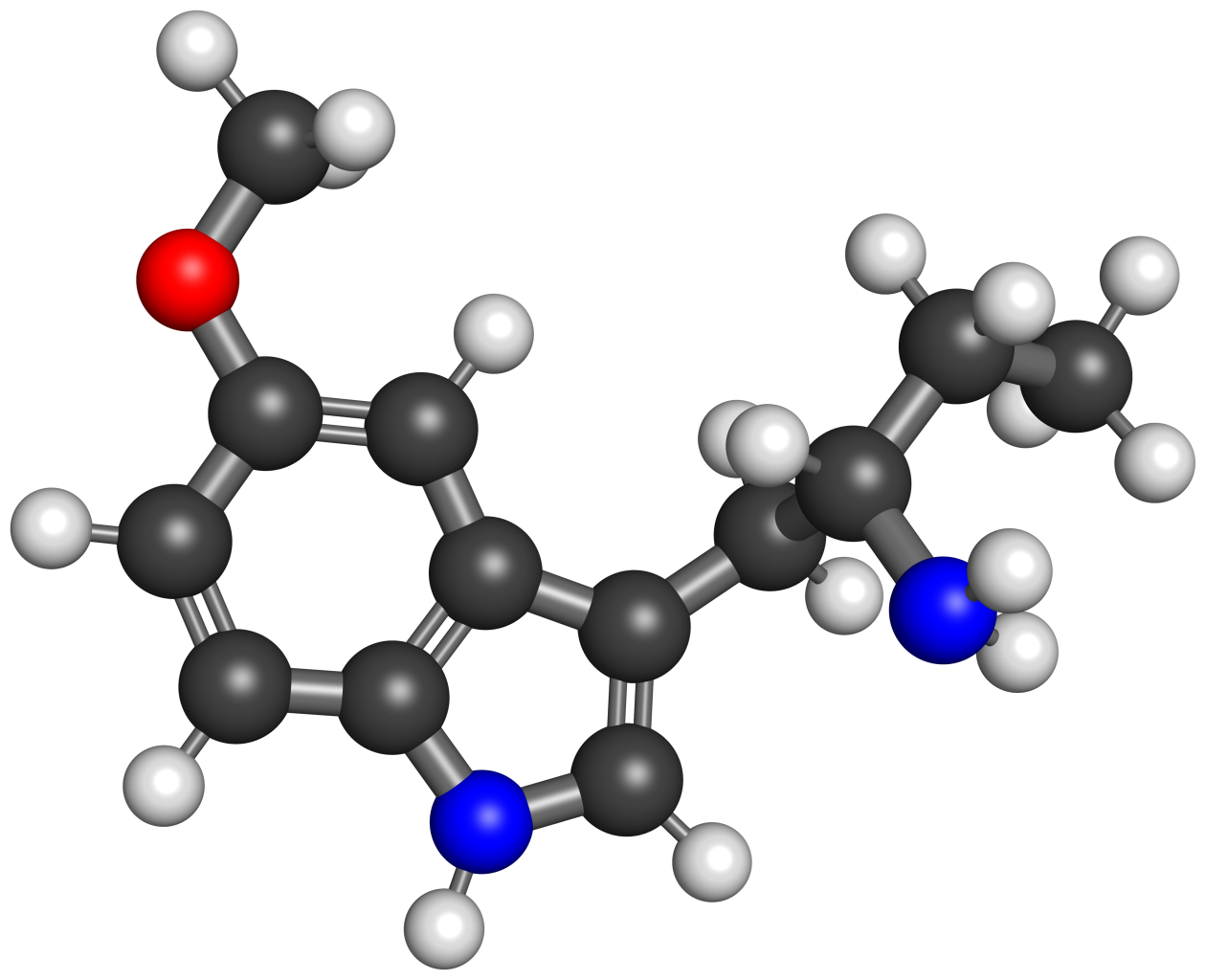

Clinical data
- Other names: 5-Methoxy-α-ethyltryptamine; 5-MeO-αET; 5-MeO-AET
- Routes of administration: Oral
- Drug class: Serotonin 5-HT_{2A} receptor agonist; Serotonergic psychedelic; Hallucinogen

Legal status
- Legal status: DE: NpSG (Industrial and scientific use only); UK: Class A

Identifiers
- IUPAC name: 1-(5-methoxy-1H-indol-3-yl)butan-2-amine
- CAS Number: 4765-10-0
- PubChem CID: 13679707
- ChemSpider: 21106244
- UNII: QCQ6JFX5NL
- CompTox Dashboard (EPA): DTXSID20894761

Chemical and physical data
- Formula: C_{13}H_{18}N_{2}O
- Molar mass: 218.300 g·mol^{−1}
- 3D model (JSmol): Interactive image
- Melting point: 201 to 203 °C (394 to 397 °F)
- SMILES: CCC(N)Cc2c[nH]c1ccc(cc12)OC
- InChI: InChI=1S/C13H18N2O/c1-3-10(14)6-9-8-15-13-5-4-11(16-2)7-12(9)13/h4-5,7-8,10,15H,3,6,14H2,1-2H3; Key:JHTPCKWBFLMJMQ-UHFFFAOYSA-N

5-MeO-αET, also known as 5-methoxy-α-ethyltryptamine, is a psychoactive drug of the tryptamine and α-alkyltryptamine families. It reportedly produces psychedelic and stimulant effects.

== Use and effects ==
The dose range of 5-MeO-αET is 50 to 75 mg orally. 5-MeO-αET produces entactogenic and stimulant effects that can last 4 to 6 hours. However, little information exists on the psychopharmacological effects of this compound, thus considerable variation with regard to dose and effects can be expected.

== Pharmacology ==
=== Pharmacodynamics ===
The pharmacology of 5-MeO-αET has been studied. It is a weak partial agonist of the serotonin 5-HT_{2A} receptor, with a binding affinity (K_{i}) of 4,073 nM, an EC_{50} of 166 nM, and an E_{max} of 34%. For comparison, αET showed 14-fold lower affinity for the receptor than 5-MeO-αET and was inactive as an agonist of the receptor. The individual stereoisomers of 5-MeO-αET and αET were also assessed.

== Chemistry ==
=== Analogues ===
Analogues of 5-MeO-AET include α-ethyltryptamine (AET), α-methylserotonin (5-HO-AMT), 5-MeO-AMT, 4-methyl-AET, 5-fluoro-AET, 5-EtO-AMT, 5-fluoro-AET, 5-chloro-AET, and 7-methyl-AET, among others.

== Society and culture ==
=== Legal status ===
==== Canada ====
5-MeO-AET is not a controlled substance in Canada as of 2025.

==== United States ====
5-MeO-αET is unscheduled and uncontrolled in the United States, but possession and sales of 5-MeO-αET could be prosecuted under the Federal Analog Act because of its structural similarities to αET and αMT.

== See also ==
- Substituted α-alkyltryptamine
