= Methyl-5-MeO-DMT =

Methyl-5-MeO-DMT (Me-5-MeO-DMT), also known as 5-methoxytrimethyltryptamine (5-MeO-TMT), may refer to:

- 1-Methyl-5-MeO-DMT (1-Me-5-MeO-DMT; 5-MeO-1,N,N-TMT; 5-MeO-1-TMT)
- 2-Methyl-5-MeO-DMT (2-Me-5-MeO-DMT; 5-MeO-2,N,N-TMT; 5-MeO-2-TMT)
- 4-Methyl-5-MeO-DMT (4-Me-5-MeO-DMT; 5-MeO-4,N,N-TMT; 5-MeO-4-TMT)
- 6-Methyl-5-MeO-DMT (6-Me-5-MeO-DMT; 5-MeO-6,N,N-TMT; 5-MeO-6-TMT)
- 7-Methyl-5-MeO-DMT (7-Me-5-MeO-DMT; 5-MeO-7,N,N-TMT; 5-MeO-7-TMT)
- α-Methyl-5-MeO-DMT (α-Me-5-MeO-DMT; 5-MeO-α,N,N-TMT; 5-MeO-α-TMT; α,N,N,O-TeMS)

== See also ==
- Substituted tryptamine
- Trimethyltryptamine (methyl-DMT)
- Methylpsilocin (methyl-4-HO-DMT)
- Methyltryptamine (methyl-T)
- Methylserotonin (methyl-5-HT)
