= Methylethyltryptamine (disambiguation) =

Methylethyltryptamine (abbreviated as MET) may refer to:

- N-Methyl-N-ethyltryptamine (MET or N,N-MET)
- 4-Methyl-α-ethyltryptamine (4-Me-αET or 7-Me-AET)
- 7-Methyl-α-ethyltryptamine (7-Me-αET or 7-Me-AET)

== See also ==
- Substituted tryptamine
- Methyltryptamine
- Dimethyltryptamine
- Ethyltryptamine
- Trimethyltryptamine
- Methylserotonin
