= Methyltryptamine =

Methyltryptamine (MT) may refer to:

- N-Methyltryptamine (NMT; monomethyltryptamine)
- α-Methyltryptamine (AMT or αMT; Indopan)
- 1-Methyltryptamine (1-Me-T; PAL-637)
- 2-Methyltryptamine (2-Me-T)
- 4-Methyltryptamine (4-Me-T)
- 5-Methyltryptamine (5-Me-T; PAL-22)
- 6-Methyltryptamine (6-Me-T; PAL-522)
- 7-Methyltryptamine (7-Me-T; PAL-286)

== See also ==
- Substituted tryptamine
- Dimethyltryptamine
- Ethyltryptamine
- Trimethyltryptamine
- Methylethyltryptamine
- Methoxytryptamine
- Hydroxytryptamine
- Methylserotonin
- Methylpsilocin
- Methyl-DMT
- Methyl-5-MeO-DMT
