= 7-Hydroxytryptamine =

Clinical data
- Other names: 7-HT; 7-OH-T; 7-HO-T; 7-Hydroxy-T
- Drug class: Serotonin receptor modulator; Monoamine reuptake inhibitor; Monoamine releasing agent
- ATC code: None

Identifiers
- IUPAC name: 3-(2-aminoethyl)-1H-indol-7-ol
- CAS Number: 15700-23-9
- PubChem CID: 11171282
- ChemSpider: 9346374

Chemical and physical data
- Formula: C_{10}H_{12}N_{2}O
- Molar mass: 176.219 g·mol^{−1}
- 3D model (JSmol): Interactive image
- SMILES: C1=CC2=C(C(=C1)O)NC=C2CCN
- InChI: InChI=1S/C10H12N2O/c11-5-4-7-6-12-10-8(7)2-1-3-9(10)13/h1-3,6,12-13H,4-5,11H2; Key:RETCYVKOCFWWTL-UHFFFAOYSA-N

7-Hydroxytryptamine (7-HT) is a serotonin receptor modulator of the tryptamine family. It is the 7-hydroxy derivative of tryptamine and is a positional isomer of serotonin (5-hydroxytryptamine; 5-HT).

The drug shows sympathomimetic effects similarly to serotonin. On the other hand, similarly to 6-hydroxytryptamine but in contrast to serotonin, it showed little or no activity as a serotonin receptor agonist in the rabbit thoracic aorta, which expresses serotonin 5-HT_{2} receptors. The drug is known to act as a serotonin–norepinephrine–dopamine reuptake inhibitor (SNDRI), with greater potency on catecholamine reuptake than serotonin reuptake, whereas its possible effects in terms of monoamine release induction were not assessed. However, in other studies, 7-HT was reported to increase serotonin and norepinephrine release. It did not show the long-lasting monoaminergic neurotoxicity of certain related compounds like 5,7-dihydroxytryptamine (5,7-DHT) in rodents.

7-HT was first described in the scientific literature by Irvine Page by 1952.

== See also ==
- Substituted tryptamine
- 4-Hydroxytryptamine (4-HT)
- 6-Hydroxytryptamine (6-HT)
- 7-Methoxytryptamine
- 7-Fluorotryptamine
- 7-Chlorotryptamine
- 7-Methyltryptamine
- 5,7-Dihydroxytryptamine (5,7-DHT)
- 7-Hydroxy-DMT
- 7-Methoxy-DMT
