= Trimethyltryptamine =

Trimethyltryptamine (TMT), also known as methyldimethyltryptamine (methyl-DMT or Me-DMT), may refer to:

- N,N,N-Trimethyltryptamine (N,N,N-TMT; N-methyl-DMT)
- α,N,N-Trimethyltryptamine (α,N,N-TMT; α-methyl-DMT or N,N-dimethyl-AMT)
- β,N,N-Trimethyltryptamine (β,N,N-TMT; β-methyl-DMT)
- 1,N,N-Trimethyltryptamine (1,N,N-TMT; 1-methyl-DMT)
- 2,N,N-Trimethyltryptamine (2,N,N-TMT; 2-methyl-DMT)
- 4,N,N-Trimethyltryptamine (4,N,N-TMT; 4-methyl-DMT)
- 5,N,N-Trimethyltryptamine (5,N,N-TMT; 5-methyl-DMT)
- 6,N,N-Trimethyltryptamine (6,N,N-TMT; 6-methyl-DMT)
- 7,N,N-Trimethyltryptamine (7,N,N-TMT; 7-methyl-DMT)

== See also ==
- Substituted tryptamine
- Methyltryptamine
- Dimethyltryptamine
- Methoxydimethyltryptamine
- Ethyltryptamine
- Methylethyltryptamine
- Trimethylserotonin
- Methylpsilocin
- Methyl-5-MeO-DMT
- Ten classic ladies
