= Tetramethylserotonin =

Tetramethylserotonin (TeMS) may refer to:

- 5-Methoxy-2,N,N-trimethyltryptamine (5-MeO-2-TMT; 2,α,N,N-tetramethylserotonin; 2,α,N,N-TeMS)
- 5-Methoxy-7,N,N-trimethyltryptamine (5-MeO-7-TMT; 7,α,N,N-tetramethylserotonin; 7,α,N,N-TeMS)
- α,N,N,O-Tetramethylserotonin (α,N,N,O-TeMS; 5-methoxy-α,N,N-trimethyltryptamine; 5-MeO-α,N,N-TMT)

== See also ==
- Substituted tryptamine
- Methylserotonin
- Dimethylserotonin
- Trimethylserotonin
