= 7-Fluorotryptamine =

Clinical data
- Other names: 7-F-T; 7-Fluoro-T; 7-FT
- Drug class: Serotonin receptor modulator; GPRC5A agonist
- ATC code: None

Identifiers
- IUPAC name: 2-(7-fluoro-1H-indol-3-yl)ethanamine
- CAS Number: 191927-74-9
- PubChem CID: 2769362
- ChemSpider: 2049887
- ChEMBL: ChEMBL205229
- CompTox Dashboard (EPA): DTXSID90377692
- ECHA InfoCard: 100.197.219

Chemical and physical data
- Formula: C_{10}H_{11}FN_{2}
- Molar mass: 178.210 g·mol^{−1}
- 3D model (JSmol): Interactive image
- SMILES: C1=CC2=C(C(=C1)F)NC=C2CCN
- InChI: InChI=1S/C10H11FN2/c11-9-3-1-2-8-7(4-5-12)6-13-10(8)9/h1-3,6,13H,4-5,12H2; Key:QRAWNNQNLQPNIZ-UHFFFAOYSA-N

7-Fluorotryptamine (7-FT) is a serotonin receptor modulator and weak GPRC5A agonist of the tryptamine family. It is the 7-fluoro derivative of tryptamine. The drug is a low-potency agonist of the orphan receptor GPRC5A, with an EC_{50} of 7,200 nM. In addition to its GPRC5A agonism, 7-fluorotryptamine interacts with other receptors, such as the serotonin 5-HT_{4} receptor. Derivatives of 7-fluorotryptamine have been described. 7-Fluorotryptamine was first described in the scientific literature by 1979. Its GPRC5A agonism was first described in 2023.

== See also ==
- Substituted tryptamine
- 7-Chlorotryptamine
- 7-Methyltryptamine
- 7-Hydroxytryptamine
- 7-F-5-MeO-MET
- 7-Chloro-AMT
