= C12H15ClN2 =

The molecular formula C_{12}H_{15}ClN_{2} (molar mass: 222.72 g/mol) may refer to:

- 5-Chloro-DMT
- 5-Chloro-αET
