= 5-Fluoro-AET =

Chemical compound

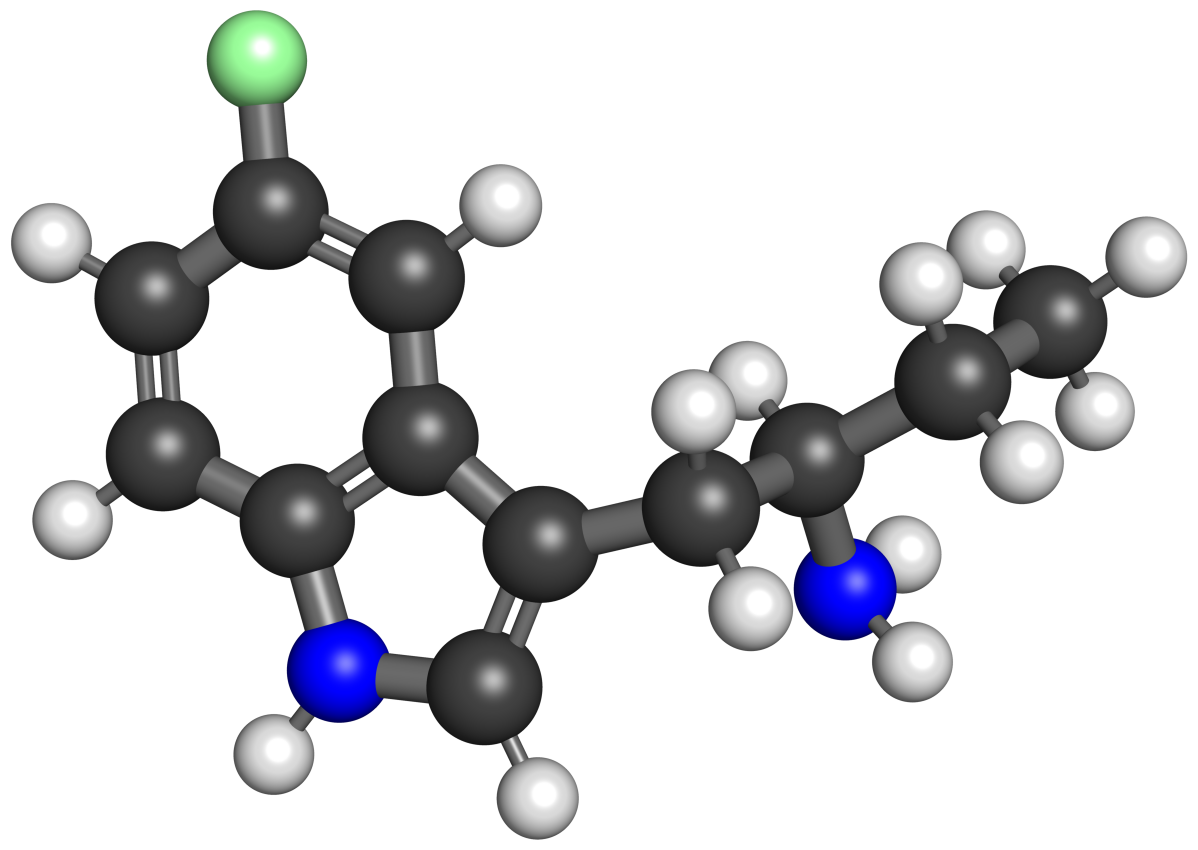

Clinical data
- Other names: 5-Fluoro-α-ethyltryptamine; 5-F-AET; 5F-AET; 5-Fluoro-αET; 5-F-αET; 5F-αET; PAL-545
- Drug class: Serotonin–norepinephrine–dopamine releasing agent; Serotonin receptor agonist; Entactogen

Identifiers
- IUPAC name: 1-(5-fluoro-1H-indol-3-yl)butan-2-amine
- CAS Number: 1380137-98-3
- PubChem CID: 118713118
- ChemSpider: 26955850
- ChEMBL: ChEMBL3330648

Chemical and physical data
- Formula: C_{12}H_{15}FN_{2}
- Molar mass: 206.264 g·mol^{−1}
- 3D model (JSmol): Interactive image
- SMILES: CCC(CC1=CNC2=C1C=C(C=C2)F)N
- InChI: InChI=1S/C12H15FN2/c1-2-10(14)5-8-7-15-12-4-3-9(13)6-11(8)12/h3-4,6-7,10,15H,2,5,14H2,1H3; Key:QGUZSMSUGSSPNJ-UHFFFAOYSA-N

5-Fluoro-AET, also known as 5-fluoro-α-ethyltryptamine or by the code name PAL-545, is a substituted tryptamine derivative which acts as a serotonin–dopamine releasing agent (SDRA) and as an agonist of the serotonin 5-HT_{2A} receptor.

== Pharmacology ==
=== Pharmacodynamics ===
Its EC_{50} values for monoamine release are 36.6 nM for serotonin, 5,334 nM for norepinephrine, and 150 nM for dopamine in rat brain synaptosomes. Its EC_{50} at the serotonin 5-HT_{2A} receptor is 246 nM and its E_{max} at the receptor is 87%.

Several close analogues of 5-fluoro-αET, including 5-fluoro-αMT and 5-chloro-αMT, are known to be potent monoamine oxidase inhibitors (MAOIs), specifically of monoamine oxidase A (MAO-A). However, α-ethyltryptamine (αET) is a very weak MAOI. 5-Fluoro-αET has also more recently been assessed, and in contrast to αET, but similarly to drugs like 5-fluoro-αET, was found to be a potent MAOI, with an IC_{50} of 2,480 nM. Potent monoamine oxidase inhibition by monoamine releasing agents (MRAs) has been associated with dangerous and sometimes fatal toxicity in humans.

== Chemistry ==
=== Analogues ===
Analogues of 5-fluoro-AET include α-ethyltryptamine (AET), 5-fluorotryptamine, 4-methyl-AET, 5-chloro-AET, 5-chloro-AMT, 5-fluoro-AMT, 5-fluoro-DMT, bretisilocin (5-fluoro-MET), 5-MeO-AET, 6-fluoro-AMT, 7-chloro-AMT, 7-methyl-DMT, and 7-methyl-AET, among others.

== Society and culture ==
=== Legal status ===
==== Canada ====
5-Fluoro-AET is not an explicitly nor implicitly controlled substance in Canada as of 2025.

==== United States ====
5-Fluoro-AET is not an explicitly controlled substance in the United States. However, it could be considered a controlled substance under the Federal Analogue Act if intended for human consumption.

== See also ==
- Substituted α-alkyltryptamine
