= 1-Propyl-5-MeO-AMT =

Clinical data
- Other names: 1-Propyl-5-MeO-DMT; 1-Pr-5-MeO-DMT; 1-Propyl-5-methoxy-α-methyltryptamine; N1-n-Propyl-5-methoxy-α-methyltryptamine
- Drug class: Serotonin receptor modulator; Serotonin 5-HT_{2A} receptor modulator

Identifiers
- IUPAC name: 1-(5-methoxy-1-propylindol-3-yl)propan-2-amine
- PubChem CID: 14739627
- ChemSpider: 23182714
- ChEMBL: ChEMBL439773

Chemical and physical data
- Formula: C_{15}H_{22}N_{2}O
- Molar mass: 246.354 g·mol^{−1}
- 3D model (JSmol): Interactive image
- SMILES: CCCN1C=C(C2=C1C=CC(=C2)OC)CC(C)N
- InChI: InChI=1S/C15H22N2O/c1-4-7-17-10-12(8-11(2)16)14-9-13(18-3)5-6-15(14)17/h5-6,9-11H,4,7-8,16H2,1-3H3; Key:DAGLCFOMYRIMJJ-UHFFFAOYSA-N

1-Propyl-5-MeO-AMT, also known as 1-propyl-5-methoxy-α-methyltryptamine, is a serotonin receptor modulator of the tryptamine, α-alkyltryptamine, and 5-methoxytryptamine families. It is the 1-propyl derivative of 5-methoxy-α-methyltryptamine (5-MeO-AMT).

Whereas most tryptamines are highly non-selective in terms of binding to serotonin receptors, 1-propyl-5-MeO-AMT shows selectivity for the serotonin 5-HT_{2A} receptor. Its affinities (K_{i}) for serotonin receptors were 12 nM for the serotonin 5-HT_{2A} receptor, 120 nM for the serotonin 5-HT_{2C} receptor, 5,000 nM for the serotonin 5-HT_{1B} receptor, 7,100 nM for the serotonin 5-HT_{1A} receptor, and >10,000 nM for the serotonin 5-HT_{1D} receptor, whereas other serotonin receptors were not reported. Its capacity and potency in activating the serotonin receptors was also not reported.

The drug was developed by Richard Glennon and colleagues and was first described in 1990. At the time, it was described as the most 5-HT_{2A} receptor-selective tryptamine known to date.

== See also ==
- 1-Methyltryptamine
- 1-Methylpsilocin (1-methyl-4-HO-DMT)
- Lespedamine (1-methoxy-DMT)
- O-4310 (1-isopropyl-6-fluoro-4-HO-DMT)
- MLD-41 (1-methyl-LSD)
- Methysergide (1-methylmethylergometrine)
