= Dimethylserotonin =

Dimethylserotonin (DMS) may refer to:

- Bufotenin (N,N-dimethylserotonin)
- 5-MeO-AMT (α,O-dimethylserotonin)
- 5-MeO-NMT (O,N-dimethylserotonin)

== See also ==
- Substituted tryptamine
- Methylserotonin
- Trimethylserotonin
- Tetramethylserotonin
- Dimethyltryptamine
