= Methylpsilocin =

Methylpsilocin (also known as methyl-4-HO-DMT or Me-4-HO-DMT) may refer to the following:

- 1-Methylpsilocin (1-Me-4-HO-DMT)
- O-Methylpsilocin (4-MeO-DMT; 4-HO-DMT O-methyl ether; psilocin O-methyl ether; PSOM)
- N-Methylpsilocin (4-HO-TMT; 4-hydroxy-N,N,N-trimethyltryptammonium; dephosphorylated aeruginascin)

== See also ==
- Substituted tryptamine
- Methyltryptamine
- Methyldimethyltryptamine (methyl-DMT)
- Methoxydimethyltryptamine (methoxy-DMT)
- Methyl-5-MeO-DMT
- Methylserotonin
