= Dimethyltryptamine (disambiguation) =

Dimethyltryptamine (DMT) may refer to:

- N,N-Dimethyltryptamine (N,N-DMT)
- α,N-Dimethyltryptamine (α,N-DMT; N-methyl-αMT; SK&F-7024, Ro 3–1715)
- 4,α-Dimethyltryptamine (4,α-DMT; 4-methyl-AMT; MP-809)

== See also ==
- Substituted tryptamine
- Methyltryptamine
- Ethyltryptamine
- Trimethyltryptamine
- Methylethyltryptamine
- Dimethylserotonin
