= Trimethylserotonin =

Trimethylserotonin (TMS) may refer to:

- Bufotenidine (N,N,N-trimethylserotonin)
- 5-MeO-DMT (N,N,O-trimethylserotonin)
- α,N,O-TMS (α,N,O-trimethylserotonin)
- α,N,N-TMS (α,N,N-trimethylserotonin)

== See also ==
- Substituted tryptamine
- Methylserotonin
- Dimethylserotonin
- Tetramethylserotonin
- Trimethyltryptamine
