= Ethyltryptamine =

Ethyltryptamine (ET) may refer to:

- α-Ethyltryptamine (AET or αET; Monase)
- N-Ethyltryptamine (NET)

== See also ==
- Substituted tryptamine
- Methyltryptamine
- Dimethyltryptamine
- Trimethyltryptamine
- Methylethyltryptamine
- Methylserotonin
