= 7-Chlorotryptamine =

Clinical data
- Other names: 7-Chloro-T; 7-CT; 7-Cl-T; PAL-532; PAL532
- Drug class: Serotonin receptor agonist; Serotonin releasing agent

Identifiers
- IUPAC name: 2-(7-chloro-1H-indol-3-yl)ethanamine
- CAS Number: 3804-16-8
- PubChem CID: 145709
- ChemSpider: 128536
- ChEMBL: ChEMBL3330643
- CompTox Dashboard (EPA): DTXSID50191457

Chemical and physical data
- Formula: C_{10}H_{11}ClN_{2}
- Molar mass: 194.66 g·mol^{−1}
- 3D model (JSmol): Interactive image
- SMILES: C1=CC2=C(C(=C1)Cl)NC=C2CCN
- InChI: InChI=1S/C10H11ClN2/c11-9-3-1-2-8-7(4-5-12)6-13-10(8)9/h1-3,6,13H,4-5,12H2; Key:QKRNGBURTLCWBQ-UHFFFAOYSA-N

7-Chlorotryptamine (7-chloro-T, 7-CT, or 7-Cl-T; code name PAL-532) is a serotonin receptor agonist and monoamine releasing agent (MRA) of the tryptamine family. It is a pale yellow solid. It is a full agonist of the serotonin 5-HT_{2A} receptor, with an EC_{50} of 18.8 nM and an E_{max} of 102%. In addition, it is a serotonin releasing agent (SRA), with EC_{50} values of 8.03 nM for serotonin, 656 nM for norepinephrine, and 1,330 nM for dopamine in rat brain synaptosomes. The drug is one of the most potent SRAs in vitro known, after 6-fluorotryptamine (6-FT) and naphthylaminopropane (NAP; PAL-287). 7-CT was first described in the scientific literature by 2014.

== See also ==
- Substituted tryptamine
- 7-Fluorotryptamine
- 7-Chloro-AMT
- 7-Methyl-DMT
- 5-Chlorotryptamine
- 5-Fluorotryptamine
- 6-Fluorotryptamine
- 1-Methyltryptamine
- 5-Methyltryptamine
- 5-Methoxytryptamine
