= O-4310 =

Chemical compound

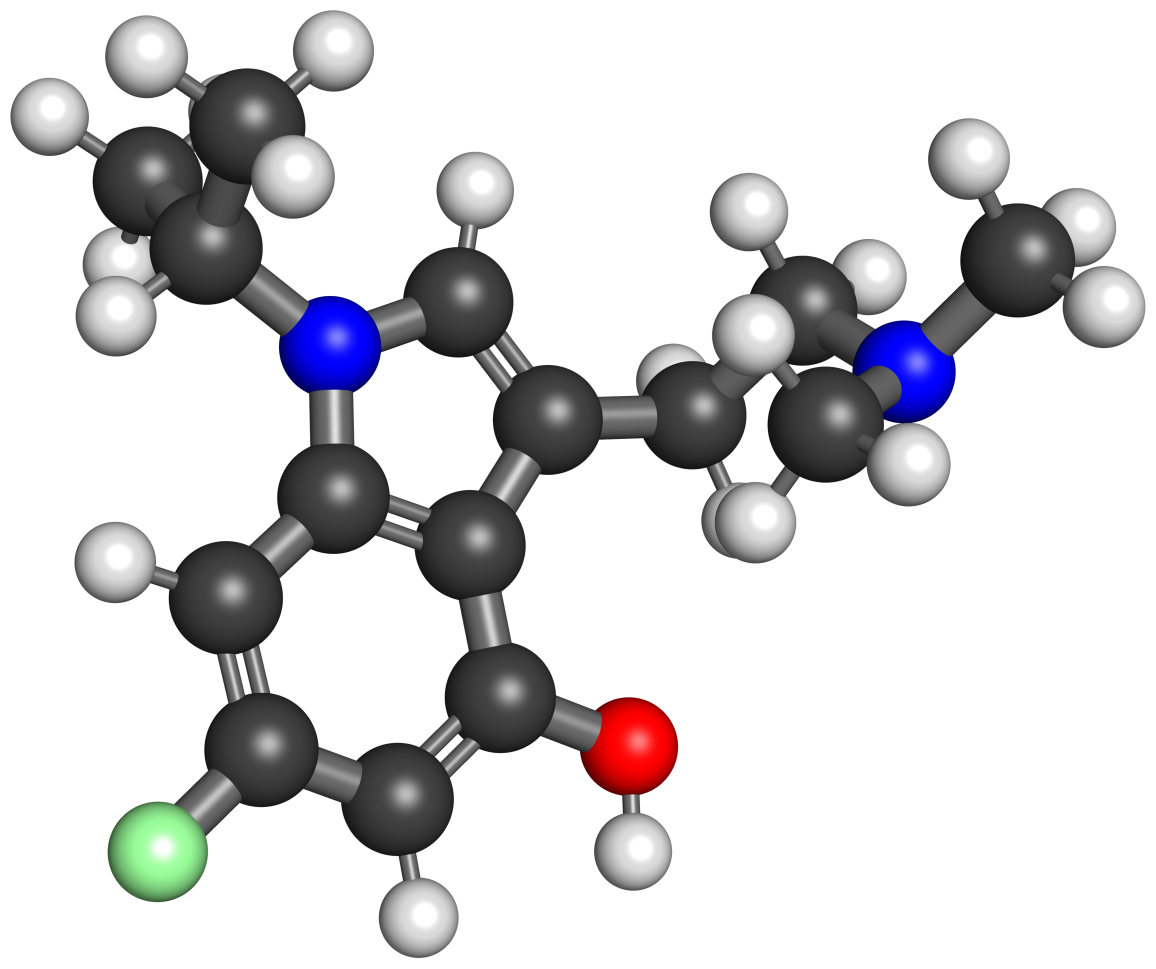

Clinical data
- Other names: O4310; 1-Isopropyl-6-fluoropsilocin; 1-iPr-6-F-psilocin; 1-iPr-6-F-4-HO-DMT
- Drug class: Serotonin 5-HT_{2A} receptor agonist

Identifiers
- IUPAC name: 3-[2-(dimethylamino)ethyl]-6-fluoro-1-isopropyl-1H-indol-4-ol
- CAS Number: 885671-63-6
- PubChem CID: 68541087
- ChemSpider: 65322014
- UNII: EJ3AE64233
- CompTox Dashboard (EPA): DTXSID001045394

Chemical and physical data
- Formula: C_{15}H_{21}FN_{2}O
- Molar mass: 264.344 g·mol^{−1}
- 3D model (JSmol): Interactive image
- SMILES: CC(C)N1C2=CC(F)=CC(O)=C2C(CCN(C)C)=C1
- InChI: InChI=1S/C15H21FN2O/c1-10(2)18-9-11(5-6-17(3)4)15-13(18)7-12(16)8-14(15)19/h7-10,19H,5-6H2,1-4H3; Key:PAUIFMSQKOHMQT-UHFFFAOYSA-N

O-4310, also known as 1-isopropyl-6-fluoropsilocin (1-iPr-6-F-4-HO-DMT), is a serotonin receptor agonist of the tryptamine family. It is the 1-isopropylated and 6-fluorinated derivative of the serotonergic psychedelic psilocin.

== Pharmacology ==
The drug is said to be a serotonin 5-HT_{2A} receptor agonist and to be highly selective for activation of this receptor over the closely related serotonin 5-HT_{2B} and 5-HT_{2C} receptors. Its EC_{50} at the serotonin 5-HT_{2A} receptor was reported to be 5 nM and it was said to have an E_{max} of 89% relative to serotonin. Conversely, O-4310 was said to be inactive at the serotonin 5-HT_{2B} receptor, with no EC_{50} or E_{max} reported for this receptor, and was claimed to have an EC_{50} of 592 nM at the serotonin 5-HT_{2C} receptor with an E_{max} of approximately 50%. Hence, O-4310 appears to show about 118-fold selectivity for activation of the serotonin 5-HT_{2A} receptor over the serotonin 5-HT_{2C} receptor.

The pharmacodynamic activity of O-4310 was briefly described in a patent but not in the published scientific literature. If the reported data are accurate, O-4310, along with other drugs like 25CN-NBOH and (S,S)-DMBMPP, would be one of the most selective known agonists of the serotonin 5-HT_{2A} receptor over the other serotonin 5-HT_{2} receptors.

== History ==
O-4310 was patented by Bryan Roth and colleagues in 2006 and the patent was assigned to the American pharmaceutical company Organix Inc. The drug was also employed in an animal study and described in the scientific literature by a group of Iranian researchers in 2017.

== See also ==
- Substituted tryptamine
- 1-Methyltryptamine
- 1-Methylpsilocin
- 1-Propyl-5-MeO-AMT
- Lespedamine (1-methoxy-DMT)
- 6-Fluoro-DMT
- SCHEMBL5334361
- 7-F-5-MeO-MET
