= Methoxytryptamine =

Methoxytryptamine (methoxy-T, MeO-T, or OMe-T) may refer to:

- 1-Methoxytryptamine
- 2-Methoxytryptamine
- 4-Methoxytryptamine
- 5-Methoxytryptamine
- 6-Methoxytryptamine
- 7-Methoxytryptamine

== See also ==
- Hydroxytryptamine
- Methyltryptamine
- Methoxy-DMT
