= Α,N,N-Trimethyltryptamine =

Psychoactive drug

α,N,N-Trimethyltryptamine

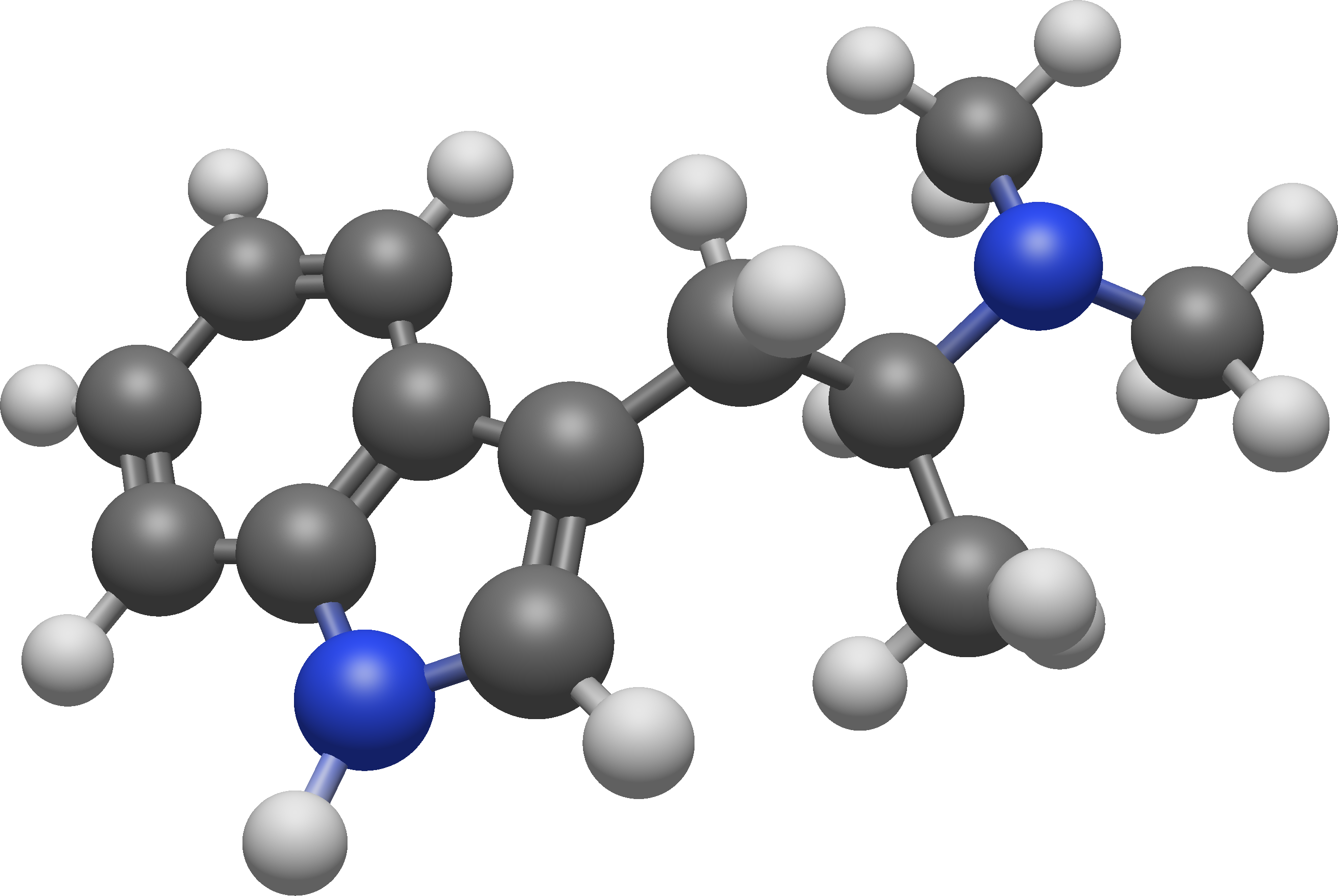

Clinical data
- Other names: α,N,N-TMT; α-TMT; ATMT; α-Methyl-N,N-dimethyltryptamine; α-Methyl-DMT; α-Me-DMT; Alpha-N
- Routes of administration: Oral
- Drug class: Serotonergic psychedelic; Hallucinogen

Identifiers
- IUPAC name: (2-(1H-Indol-3-yl)-1-methyl-ethyl)dimethylamine
- CAS Number: 4761-32-4
- PubChem CID: 134080494
- ChemSpider: 59718639
- UNII: 8AV9QTP9HK
- CompTox Dashboard (EPA): DTXSID401336121

Chemical and physical data
- Formula: C_{13}H_{18}N_{2}
- Molar mass: 202.301 g·mol^{−1}
- 3D model (JSmol): Interactive image
- SMILES: CN(C)C(C)Cc2c[nH]c1ccccc12
- InChI: InChI=1S/C13H18N2/c1-10(15(2)3)8-11-9-14-13-7-5-4-6-12(11)13/h4-7,9-10,14H,8H2,1-3H3; Key:XQFCCTPWINMCQJ-UHFFFAOYSA-N

α,N,N-Trimethyltryptamine (α,N,N-TMT, α-TMT, or ATMT), also known as α-methyl-N,N-dimethyltryptamine (α-methyl-DMT or α-Me-DMT) or as Alpha-N, is a psychedelic drug of the tryptamine and α-alkyltryptamine families. It is similar in chemical structure to other psychedelic tryptamines such as N,N-dimethyltryptamine (DMT) and α-methyltryptamine (αMT). It is taken orally.

== Use and effects ==
α,N,N-TMT was briefly mentioned by Alexander Shulgin in his 1997 book TiHKAL (Tryptamines I Have Known and Loved), but he did not mention having tested it and did not describe its effects, dose, or duration. In 2025, Hamilton Morris described having synthesized and assayed α,N,N-TMT. He reported that it was an active psychedelic taken orally but was much less potent than AMT.

== Pharmacology ==
=== Pharmacodynamics ===
The drug has been tested in animals and compared with α-methyltryptamine (αMT). It was found to produce similar effects as αMT, such as hyperlocomotion and reversal of reserpine-induced behavioral depression, but with only around half the potency of αMT.

== Chemistry ==
=== Analogues ===
Analogues of α,N,N-TMT (N,N-dimethyl-AMT) include α-methyltryptamine (AMT), α,N-DMT (N-methyl-AMT), α-methylserotonin (AMS; 5-HO-AMT), 5-MeO-AMT (α,O-DMS), α,N,O-TMS (N-methyl-5-MeO-AMT), and α,N,N,O-TeMS (N,N-dimethyl-5-MeO-AMT), among others.

== History ==
α,N,N-TMT was encountered as a novel designer drug in Europe by 2015.

== Society and culture ==
=== Legal status ===
==== Canada ====
α,N,N-TMT is not an explicitly nor implicitly controlled substance in Canada as of 2025.

==== United States ====
α,N,N-TMT is not an explicitly controlled substance in the United States. However, it could be considered a controlled substance under the Federal Analogue Act if intended for human consumption.

== See also ==
- Substituted α-alkyltryptamine
- Ciclindole
