= C11H13FN2 =

The molecular formula C_{11}H_{13}FN_{2} (molar mass: 192.233 g/mol, exact mass: 192.1063 u) may refer to:

- 5-Fluoro-AMT, also known as PAL-544
- 6-Fluoro-AMT
