= Hydroxytryptamine =

Hydroxytryptamine (hydroxy-T, HT, HO-T, or OH-T) may refer to:

- 1-Hydroxytryptamine
- 2-Hydroxytryptamine
- 4-Hydroxytryptamine
- 5-Hydroxytryptamine (5-HT; serotonin)
- 6-Hydroxytryptamine
- 7-Hydroxytryptamine

== See also ==
- Methoxytryptamine
- Hydroxy-DMT
