= Lespedamine =

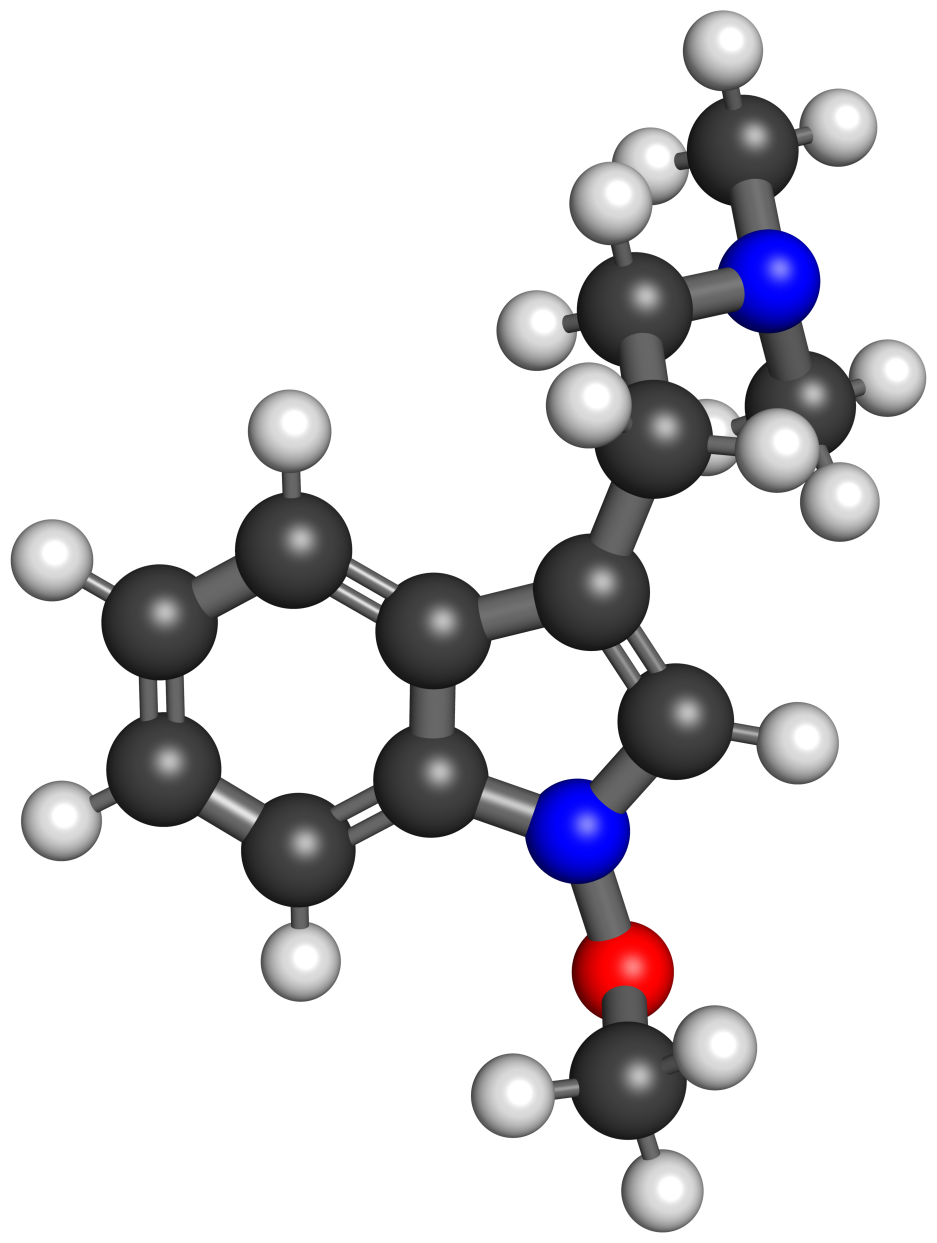

Clinical data
- Other names: 1-Methoxy-DMT; 1-MeO-DMT; 1-Methoxydimethyltryptamine; 1-Methoxy-N,N-dimethyltryptamine

Identifiers
- IUPAC name: 2-(1-methoxy-1H-indol-3-yl)-N,N-dimethylethan-1-amine
- CAS Number: 4335-93-7
- PubChem CID: 11138594
- ChemSpider: 9313707
- UNII: 6W73QAN9CK
- CompTox Dashboard (EPA): DTXSID601031963

Chemical and physical data
- Formula: C_{13}H_{18}N_{2}O
- Molar mass: 218.300 g·mol^{−1}
- 3D model (JSmol): Interactive image
- SMILES: CN(C)CCC1=CN(C2=CC=CC=C21)OC
- InChI: InChI=1S/C13H18N2O/c1-14(2)9-8-11-10-15(16-3)13-7-5-4-6-12(11)13/h4-7,10H,8-9H2,1-3H3; Key:DXTZTYQDNUHCAB-UHFFFAOYSA-N

Lespedamine, also known as 1-methoxy-N,N-dimethyltryptamine (1-methoxy-DMT or 1-MeO-DMT), is an indole alkaloid and substituted tryptamine present in the plant Lespedeza bicolor. The alkaloid bears a close structural resemblance to the psychedelic alkaloid dimethyltryptamine (DMT) and it was speculated by Alexander Shulgin in his 1997 book TiHKAL (Tryptamines I Have Known and Loved) that it might be psychoactive. No reports on lespedamine's biological activity are known to have been published. Lespedamine is not an explicitly controlled substance in the United States, but may be considered a Schedule I controlled substance in this country as it is a positional isomer of 5-MeO-DMT.

== See also ==
- Substituted tryptamine
- 1-Methyl-DMT
- 1-Methyltryptamine
- 1-Methylpsilocin (1-methyl-4-HO-DMT)
- 1-Propyl-5-MeO-AMT
