= 7-Chloro-AMT =

Chemical compound

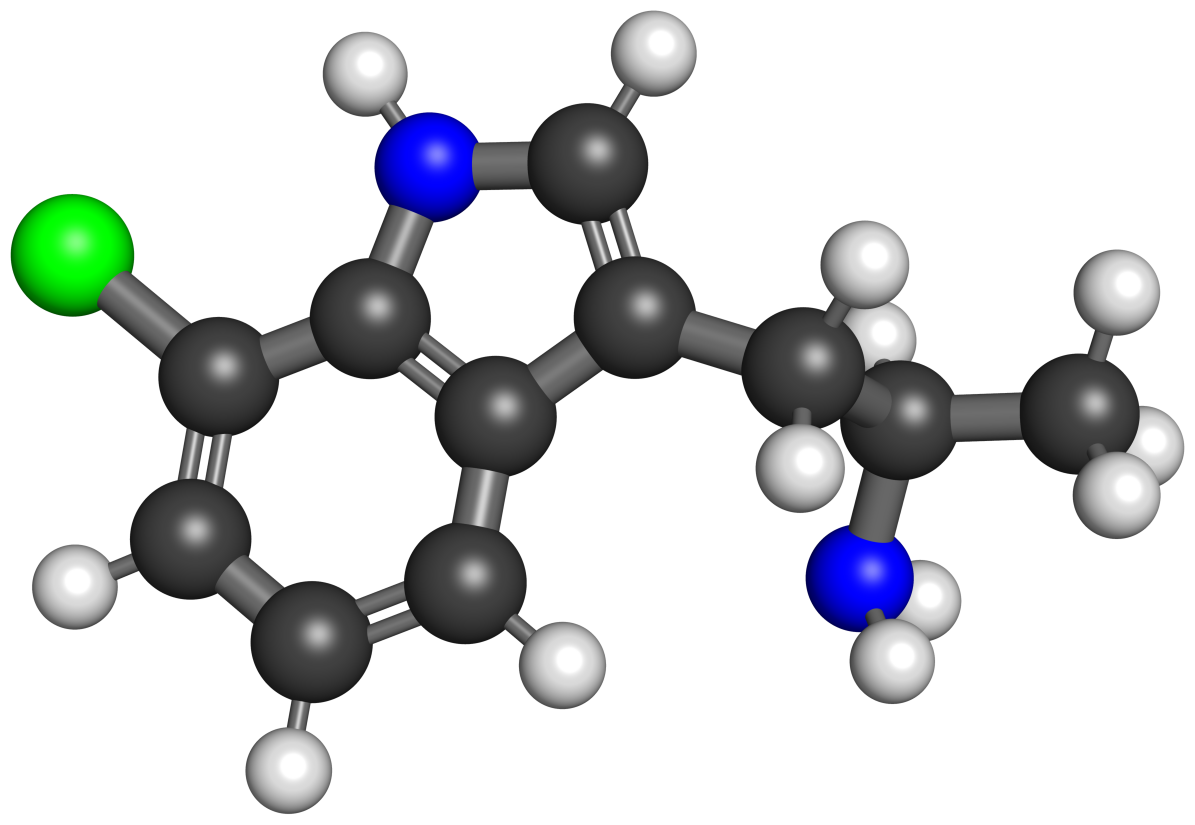

Identifiers
- IUPAC name: 1-(7-chloro-1H-indol-3-yl)propan-2-amine
- CAS Number: 711-99-9
- PubChem CID: 13900
- ChemSpider: 13298
- UNII: J4Y6BPR38T

Chemical and physical data
- Formula: C_{11}H_{13}ClN_{2}
- Molar mass: 208.69 g·mol^{−1}
- 3D model (JSmol): Interactive image
- SMILES: CC(CC1=CNC2=C1C=CC=C2Cl)N
- InChI: InChI=1S/C11H13ClN2/c1-7(13)5-8-6-14-11-9(8)3-2-4-10(11)12/h2-4,6-7,14H,5,13H2,1H3; Key:OHEYTFPYHFDAJQ-UHFFFAOYSA-N

7-Chloro-α-methyltryptamine (7-Cl-AMT) is a tryptamine derivative with stimulant effects, invented in the 1960s. It is a weak monoamine oxidase inhibitor but its pharmacology has not otherwise been studied by modern techniques, though several closely related compounds are known to act as serotonin–dopamine releasing agents and agonists of the 5-HT_{2A} receptor.

== See also ==
- Substituted tryptamine
- 7-Chlorotryptamine
- 5-Chloro-AMT
- 5-Chloro-DMT
- 5-Fluoro-AMT
- 5-Fluoro-AET
- 5-Fluoro-DMT
- 6-Fluoro-AMT
- 7-Methyl-DMT
- 7-Methyl-AET
- 7F-5-MeO-MET
- O-4310
