= 7-Methyl-α-ethyltryptamine =

Chemical compound

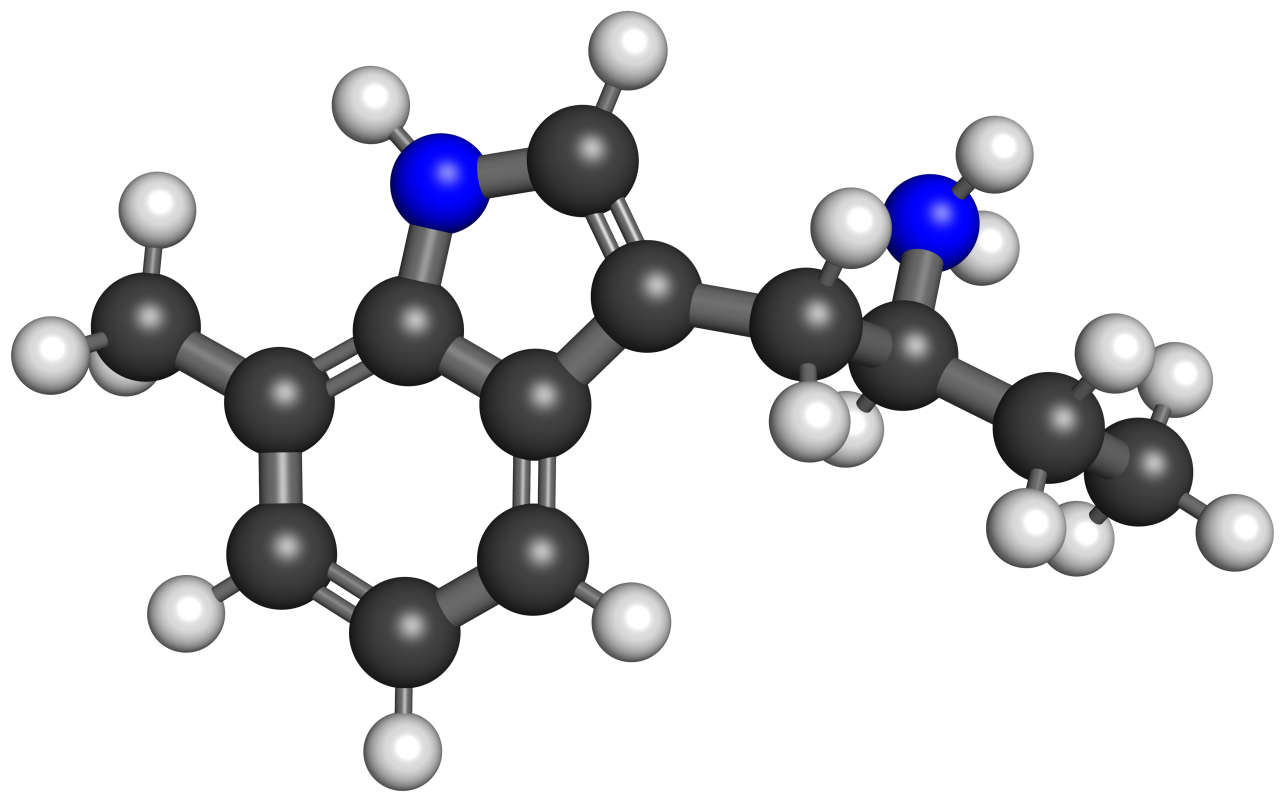

Identifiers
- IUPAC name: 1-(7-methyl-1H-indol-3-yl)butan-2-amine
- CAS Number: 13712-80-6 freebase 13518-76-8 hydrochloride salt
- PubChem CID: 57469234
- ChemSpider: 26286844
- UNII: 7H5EU45L83
- CompTox Dashboard (EPA): DTXSID60726754

Chemical and physical data
- Formula: C_{13}H_{18}N_{2}
- Molar mass: 202.301 g·mol^{−1}
- 3D model (JSmol): Interactive image
- SMILES: CCC(N)CC1=CNC2=C(C)C=CC=C21
- InChI: InChI=1S/C13H18N2/c1-3-11(14)7-10-8-15-13-9(2)5-4-6-12(10)13/h4-6,8,11,15H,3,7,14H2,1-2H3; Key:NBLFITFQOPGXLS-UHFFFAOYSA-N

7-Methyl-α-ethyltryptamine (7-Me-αET) is a tryptamine derivative related to α-ethyltryptamine (αET). It was discovered by a team at Upjohn in the early 1960s. It has similar pharmacological effects to αET, but is both 3-4 times more potent as a serotonin releasing agent, and 10 times more potent as a monoamine oxidase inhibitor, making it potentially hazardous as this pharmacological profile is shared with drugs such as PMA and 4-MTA, which are known to be dangerous in humans when used at high doses.

== Chemistry ==
=== Analogues ===
Analogues of 7-methyl-AET include α-ethyltryptamine (AET), 4-methyl-AET, 5-fluoro-AET, 5-chloro-AET, 7-chloro-AMT, and 7-methyl-DMT, among others.

== See also ==
- Substituted α-alkyltryptamine
