= 7-Methoxytryptamine =

Clinical data
- Other names: 7-Methoxy-T; 7-MeO-T; 7-OMe-T; PAL-533; PAL533
- Drug class: Serotonin receptor modulator; Serotonin 5-HT_{2A} receptor agonist; Serotonin releasing agent
- ATC code: None

Identifiers
- IUPAC name: 2-(7-methoxy-1H-indol-3-yl)ethanamine
- CAS Number: 2436-04-6
- PubChem CID: 17087
- ChemSpider: 16172
- UNII: SZ9QG5P86E
- ChEMBL: ChEMBL3330644

Chemical and physical data
- Formula: C_{11}H_{14}N_{2}O
- Molar mass: 190.246 g·mol^{−1}
- 3D model (JSmol): Interactive image
- SMILES: COC1=CC=CC2=C1NC=C2CCN
- InChI: InChI=1S/C11H14N2O/c1-14-10-4-2-3-9-8(5-6-12)7-13-11(9)10/h2-4,7,13H,5-6,12H2,1H3; Key:ZUJIGHUQQNOCAM-UHFFFAOYSA-N

7-Methoxytryptamine (7-MeO-T or 7-methoxy-T; developmental code name PAL-533) is a serotonin receptor modulator and monoamine releasing agent of the tryptamine family. It is the 7-methoxy derivative of tryptamine.

The drug acts as a full agonist of the serotonin 5-HT_{2A} receptor, with an EC_{50} of 496 nM and an E_{max} of 107%. It shows 67-fold lower potency as a serotonin 5-HT_{2A} receptor agonist compared to tryptamine itself. In addition to its serotonin 5-HT_{2A} receptor agonism, 7-methoxytryptamine is a serotonin releasing agent (SRA), with EC_{50} values for induction of monoamine release of 44.6 nM for serotonin, 2,118 nM for dopamine, and 5,600 nM for norepinephrine in rat brain synaptosomes. The effects of 7-methoxytryptamine in rodents have been described.

Tryptamines without substitutions at the amine or alpha carbon, such as tryptamine, serotonin (5-hydroxytryptamine; 5-HT), and 5-methoxytryptamine (5-MeO-T), are known to be very rapidly metabolized and thereby inactivated by monoamine oxidase A (MAO-A) in vivo and to have very short elimination half-lives. However, given intravenously at sufficiently high doses, tryptamine is still known to be able to produce weak and short-lived psychoactive effects in humans.

The chemical synthesis of 7-methoxytryptamine has been described.

7-Methoxytryptamine was first described in the scientific literature by Ernst Späth and Edgar Lederer by 1931. Its pharmacology was subsequently assessed in greater detail in 2014.

== See also ==
- Substituted tryptamine
- 7-MeO-DMT
- 7-MeO-DiPT
- 7-MeO-MiPT
- 7-Hydroxytryptamine
- 7-Methyltryptamine
