= 1-Methylpsilocin =

Chemical compound

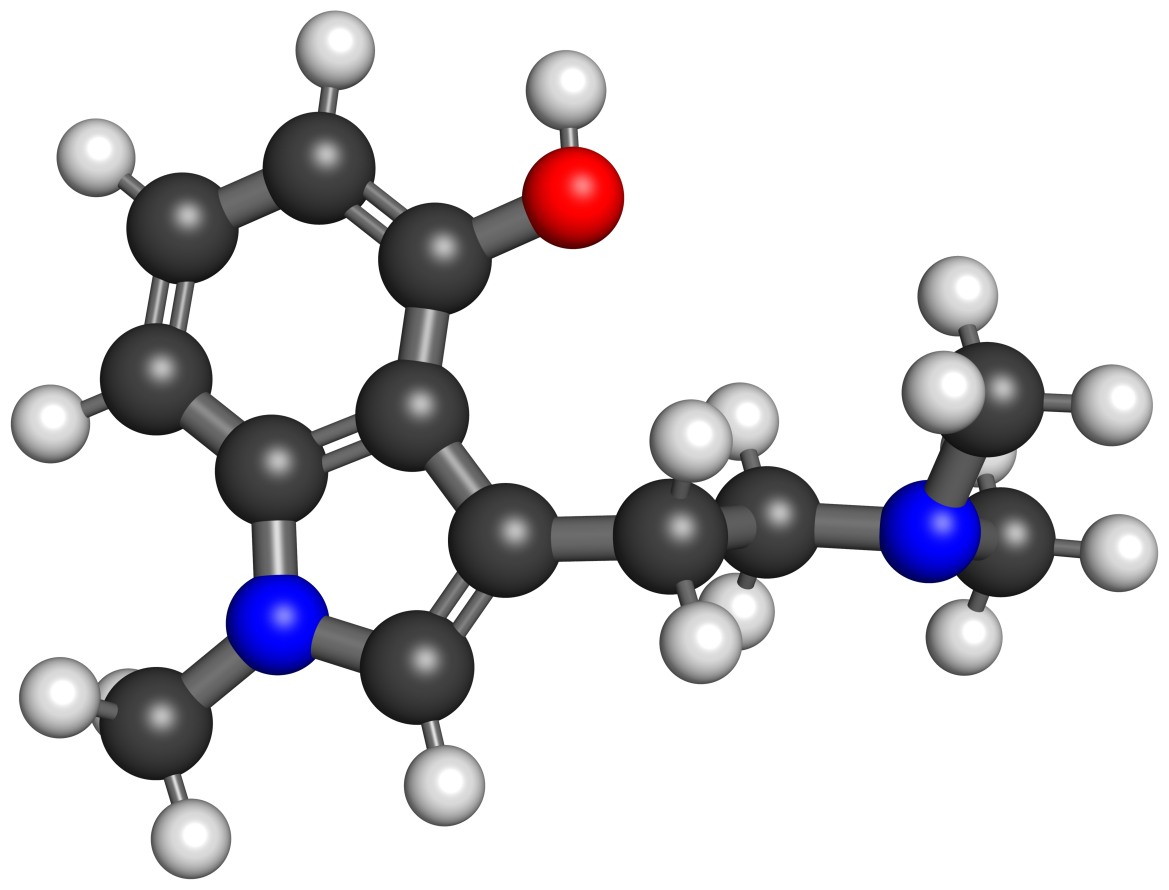

Clinical data
- Other names: CMY; CMY-16; CMY16; 1-Methyl-psilocin; 1-Methyl-4-hydroxy-N,N-dimethyltryptamine; 1-Methyl-4-HO-DMT; 1-Me-4-HO-DMT; 1-Me-4-OH-DMT
- Drug class: Serotonin receptor agonist; Serotonin 5-HT_{2C} receptor agonist; Serotonin 5-HT_{2A} receptor agonist; Serotonergic psychedelic; Hallucinogen

Identifiers
- IUPAC name: 1-methyl-3-[2-(N,N-dimethylamino)ethyl]-4-hydroxyindole
- CAS Number: 1465-16-3
- PubChem CID: 44404883
- ChemSpider: 21686519
- UNII: 65MKC68UST
- ChEMBL: ChEMBL197664
- CompTox Dashboard (EPA): DTXSID40658761

Chemical and physical data
- Formula: C_{13}H_{18}N_{2}O
- Molar mass: 218.300 g·mol^{−1}
- 3D model (JSmol): Interactive image
- SMILES: CN(C)CCc(cn1C)c2c1cccc2O
- InChI: InChI=1S/C13H18N2O/c1-14(2)8-7-10-9-15(3)11-5-4-6-12(16)13(10)11/h4-6,9,16H,7-8H2,1-3H3; Key:MZZRFEIDRWKTKJ-UHFFFAOYSA-N

1-Methylpsilocin (developmental code name CMY or CMY-16), also known as 1-methyl-4-hydroxy-N,N-dimethyltryptamine (1-Me-4-HO-DMT), is a serotonin receptor agonist and putative psychedelic drug of the tryptamine and 4-hydroxytryptamine families related to psilocin. It is the 1-methyl derivative of psilocin. The drug shows much greater selectivity as a serotonin 5-HT_{2C} receptor agonist than psilocin, but still robustly induces psychedelic-like effects in animals, albeit with lower potency.

== Use and effects ==
According to Alexander Shulgin in his book TiHKAL (Tryptamines I Have Known and Loved), 1-methylpsilocin is known to have been assessed in clinical studies by Sandoz (code name CMY or CMY-16) but its activity has not been reported. As such, its properties and effects in humans are unknown.

== Pharmacology ==
=== Pharmacodynamics ===
The affinities (K_{i}) of 1-methylpsilocin for serotonin receptors have been reported to be 900 nM for the serotonin 5-HT_{2A} receptor, 38 nM for the serotonin 5-HT_{2B} receptor, and 7.0 nM for the serotonin 5-HT_{2C} receptor (unedited/INI isoform). Its activational potencies and efficacies (EC_{50} (E_{max})) were 633 nM (31%) at the serotonin 5-HT_{2A} receptor, inverse agonism at the serotonin 5-HT_{2B} receptor (values not given), and 12 nM (45%) at the serotonin 5-HT_{2C} receptor. As a result, it was concluded that 1-methylpsilocin is a selective serotonin 5-HT_{2C} receptor agonist.

In subsequent research however, 1-methylpsilocin has been reported to have activational potencies and efficacies in terms of G_{q} dissociation BRET assays of 86 nM (73%) at the serotonin 5-HT_{2A} receptor, 32 nM (40%) at the serotonin 5-HT_{2B} receptor, and 9.5 nM at the serotonin 5-HT_{2C} receptor (92%). It was about 10-fold less potent than psilocin at the serotonin 5-HT_{2A} receptor and 30-fold less potent at the 5-HT_{2B} receptor but had similar potency at the serotonin 5-HT_{2C} receptor. Besides at the serotonin 5-HT_{2} receptors, 1-methylpsilocin has shown affinity for the serotonin 5-HT_{1A} receptor (K_{i} = 358 nM), albeit approximately 7-fold lower than that of psilocin.

Despite showing much greater potency at the serotonin 5-HT_{2C} receptor than at the 5-HT_{2A} receptor, 1-methylpsilocin produces the head-twitch response, a behavioral proxy of psychedelic effects, in rodents. This effect was absent in serotonin 5-HT_{2A} receptor knockout mice. The median effective dose (ED_{50}) of 1-methylpsilocin for induction of the head-twitch response was about 2.3-fold lower than that of psilocin (0.3 mg/kg and 0.7 mg/kg, respectively), and hence 1-methylpsilocin was somewhat less potent than psilocin. The two drugs showed similar maximal responses in terms of head twitch counts. Due to its induction of the head-twitch response, it is very likely that 1-methylpsilocin would produce hallucinogenic effects in humans, but may have reduced potency in comparison.

The fact that 1-methylpsilocin is able to robustly induce the head-twitch response similarly to psilocin suggests that serotonin 5-HT_{2C} receptor agonism does not suppress the head-twitch response mediated by the serotonin 5-HT_{2A} receptor. Accordingly, the serotonin 5-HT_{2C} receptor antagonist SB-242084 did not significantly reduce the head-twitch response induced by 1-methylpsilocin in rodents. On the other hand, 1-methylpsilocin was found to strongly suppress the head-twitch response induced by the phenethylamine psychedelic DOI (by up to 82%) in rodents. It was hypothesized that these paradoxical findings might be accounted for by differences in functional selectivity between the drugs and/or by 1-methylpsilocin possibly additionally activating certain serotonin 5-HT_{1} receptors.

Unlike psilocin, which produced hypolocomotion mediated by serotonin 5-HT_{1A} receptor activation, 1-methylpsilocin showed no effects in locomotor activity in rodents. These findings suggest that 1-methylpsilocin may be inactive as a serotonin 5-HT_{1A} receptor agonist. 1-Methylpsilocin has shown anti-obsessional-like effects in rodents. In addition, it has shown antidepressant-, antianhedonic-, and anxiolytic-like effects in rodents. In contrast to psilocin and DOI, 1-methylpsilocin did not show anti-inflammatory effects in preclinical research, which was attributed to its selectivity for the serotonin 5-HT_{2C} receptor and reduced activity at the serotonin 5-HT_{2A} receptor.

1-Methylpsilocin was shown to be a substantially biased agonist of the serotonin 5-HT_{2C} receptor at different downstream signaling pathways similarly to many other psychedelics in 2025. For instance, it was a high-efficacy agonist of the G_{q} and G_{11} pathways (89–95%), a moderate-efficacy agonist of the G_{z} pathway (66%), and a low-efficacy agonist or inactive at the G_{12}, G_{13}, G_{oA}, G_{oB}, G_{i1}, G_{i2}, G_{i3}, β-arrestin1, and β-arrestin2 pathways (0–28%).

== Chemistry ==
=== Synthesis ===
The chemical synthesis of 1-methylpsilocin has been described.

=== Analogues ===
Various analogues and derivatives of 1-methylpsilocin, including prodrugs, have been studied and described.

Some notable analogues of 1-methylpsilocin include 1-methyltryptamine, 1-methyl-DMT, lespedamine (1-methoxy-DMT), 1-propyl-5-MeO-AMT, O-4310 (1-isopropyl-6-fluoropsilocin), and CP-132,484 (4,5-dihydropyrano-1-methyltryptamine), among others. In addition, 1-methyl lysergamides like MLD-41 (1-methyl-LSD) and methysergide (1-methylmethylergometrine) are cyclized tryptamines and hence have some structural similarity to 1-methylpsilocin.

== History ==
1-Methylpsilocin was originally developed by Albert Hofmann and colleagues at Sandoz in the late 1950s. Subsequently, it was studied by Sard and colleagues at Organix in the mid-2000s and by other researchers such as Adam Halberstadt and colleagues in the 2010s and thereafter.

1-Methylpsilocin has been investigated for potential medical applications such as treatment of glaucoma, obsessive–compulsive disorder (OCD), cluster headaches, and obesity, as these conditions are amenable to treatment with psychedelic drugs but are not generally treated with such agents due to the hallucinogenic side effects they produce, which are considered undesirable. 1-Methylpsilocin therefore represents a potential alternative treatment to psilocin that may be less likely to produce hallucinogenic effects.

== See also ==
- Substituted tryptamine
