= 1-Methyl-DMT =

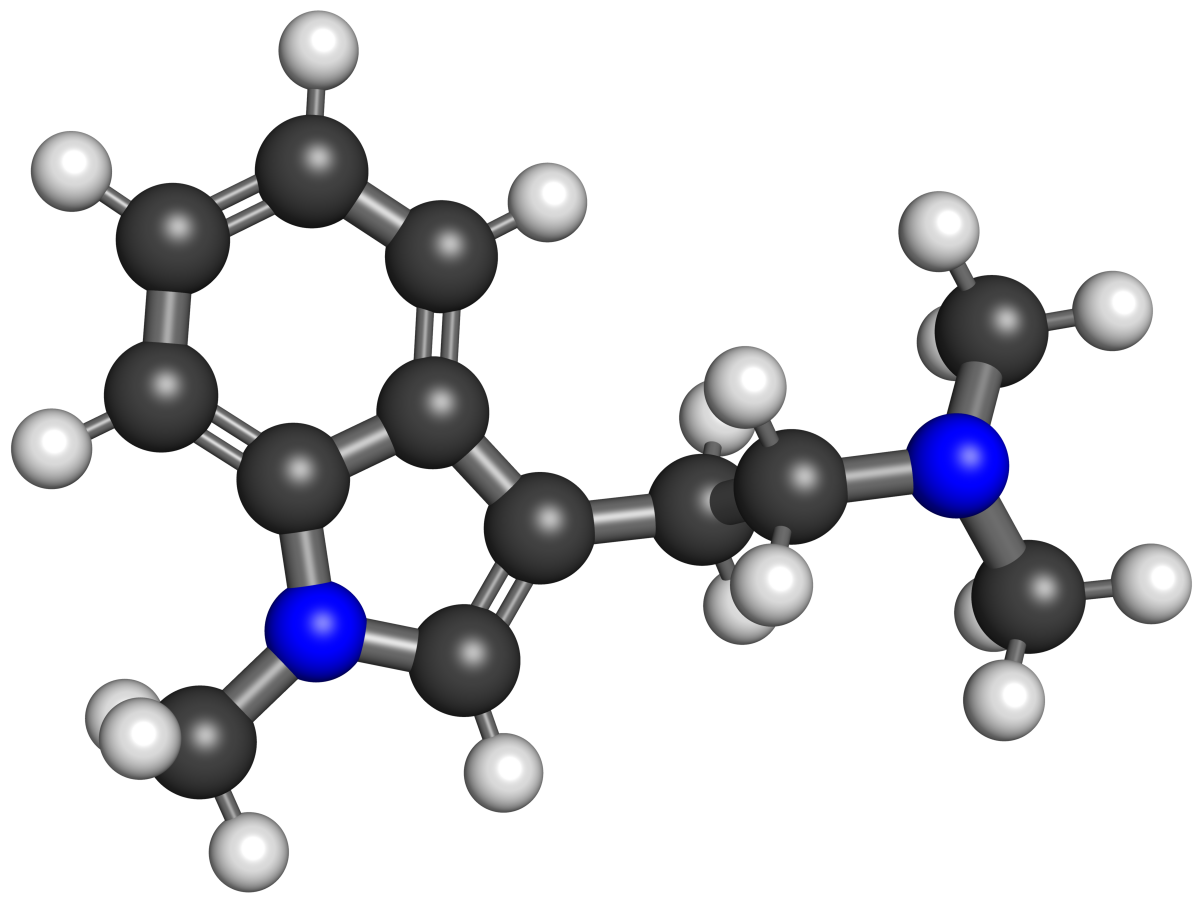

Clinical data
- Other names: 1-Me-DMT; 1-Methyl-N,N-dimethyltryptamine; 1,N,N-Timethyltryptamine; 1,N,N-TMT; 1-TMT; N,N,1-Trimethyltryptamine
- Drug class: Serotonin receptor modulator; Psychoplastogen
- ATC code: None

Identifiers
- IUPAC name: N,N-dimethyl-2-(1-methylindol-3-yl)ethanamine
- CAS Number: 13366-47-7
- PubChem CID: 25927
- ChemSpider: 24156
- ChEMBL: ChEMBL2036916
- CompTox Dashboard (EPA): DTXSID40158296

Chemical and physical data
- Formula: C_{13}H_{18}N_{2}
- Molar mass: 202.301 g·mol^{−1}
- 3D model (JSmol): Interactive image
- SMILES: CN1C=C(C2=CC=CC=C21)CCN(C)C
- InChI: InChI=1S/C13H18N2/c1-14(2)9-8-11-10-15(3)13-7-5-4-6-12(11)13/h4-7,10H,8-9H2,1-3H3; Key:WYFWKMQPMCPKLZ-UHFFFAOYSA-N

1-Methyl-DMT, or 1-Me-DMT, also known as 1-methyl-N,N-dimethyltryptamine or as 1,N,N-trimethyltryptamine (1,N,N-TMT or 1-TMT), is a serotonin receptor modulator of the tryptamine family related to dimethyltryptamine (DMT) and lespedamine (1-methoxy-DMT).

== Pharmacology ==
=== Pharmacodynamics ===
1-Methyl-DMT appears to have similar affinity for serotonin receptors as DMT, but is more toxic than DMT in rodents. In another study, it showed 3-fold higher affinity for the serotonin 5-HT_{2A} receptor than DMT. In a further study, it showed abolished affinity for the 5-HT_{1E} receptor and 30-fold lower affinity for the serotonin 5-HT_{1F} receptor than DMT. 1-Methyl-DMT shows comparable psychoplastogenic effects in preclinical research to DMT.

== Chemistry ==
=== Synthesis ===
The chemical synthesis of 1-methyl-DMT has been described.

=== Analogues ===
Analogues of 1-methyl-DMT include dimethyltryptamine (DMT), 1-methyltryptamine, lespedamine (1-MeO-DMT), 1-benzoyl-DMT, 1-methylpsilocin (1-Me-4-HO-DMT; CMY-16), 2-methyl-DMT, 4-methyl-DMT, 5-methyl-DMT, 6-methyl-DMT, and 7-methyl-DMT, among others.

== History ==
The drug was briefly mentioned by Alexander Shulgin in his 1997 book TiHKAL (Tryptamines I Have Known and Loved). 1-Methyl-DMT was first described in the scientific literature by Richard Glennon and colleagues in 1979.

== See also ==
- Substituted tryptamine
