= 6-Methyl-5-MeO-DMT =

Clinical data
- Other names: 6-Me-5-MeO-DMT; 5-Methoxy-6-methyl-DMT; 5,6-MeOM-DMT; 6-Methyl-5-methoxy-N,N-dimethyltryptamine; 6-Methylmebufotenin; 6,O-Dimethylbufotenin; 5-Methoxy-6,N,N-trimethyltryptamine; 5-MeO-6,N,N-TMT; 5-MeO-6-TMT
- Drug class: Serotonin receptor modulator; Serotonin 5-HT_{2A} receptor agonist
- ATC code: None

Identifiers
- IUPAC name: 2-(5-methoxy-6-methyl-1H-indol-3-yl)-N,N-dimethylethanamine
- CAS Number: 74798-72-4
- PubChem CID: 12650290
- ChemSpider: 23118887
- ChEMBL: ChEMBL20425

Chemical and physical data
- Formula: C_{14}H_{20}N_{2}O
- Molar mass: 232.327 g·mol^{−1}
- 3D model (JSmol): Interactive image
- SMILES: CC1=CC2=C(C=C1OC)C(=CN2)CCN(C)C
- InChI: InChI=1S/C14H20N2O/c1-10-7-13-12(8-14(10)17-4)11(9-15-13)5-6-16(2)3/h7-9,15H,5-6H2,1-4H3; Key:YPJSURIHBSXXMR-UHFFFAOYSA-N

6-Methyl-5-MeO-DMT, or 6-Me-5-MeO-DMT, also known as 5,6-MeOM-DMT, 5-MeO-6,N,N-TMT, or 6-methyl-5-methoxy-N,N-dimethyltryptamine, is a serotonin receptor modulator of the tryptamine and 5-methoxytryptamine families related to the psychedelic drug 5-MeO-DMT. It is the 6-methyl derivative of 5-MeO-DMT.

According to Alexander Shulgin in his book TiHKAL (Tryptamines I Have Known and Loved), 6-Me-5-MeO-DMT is inactive in humans at doses of up to 15 mg via smoking. For comparison, 5-MeO-DMT was active at doses of 6 to 20 mg smoked.

Unlike 5-MeO-DMT and 7-Me-5-MeO-DMT, 6-Me-5-MeO-DMT is inactive as a serotonin receptor agonist in the rat fundus strip assay and does not substitute for 5-MeO-DMT in rodent drug discrimination tests. However, 6-Me-5-MeO-DMT has subsequently been found to be a potent and high-efficacy agonist of the serotonin 5-HT_{2A} and 5-HT_{2C} receptors but not of the serotonin 5-HT_{2B} receptor.

The chemical synthesis of 6-Me-5-MeO-DMT has been described.

6-Me-5-MeO-DMT was first described in the scientific literature by Richard Glennon and colleagues by 1980. Subsequently, it was further described by Shulgin in TiHKAL in 1997.

== See also ==
- Substituted tryptamine
- 6-Methyl-DMT
- 6-Methyltryptamine
- 7-Me-5-MeO-DMT
- 5,6-MeO-MiPT
- 5,6-MDO-DMT
