= Α,N-DMT =

Chemical compound

α,N-DMT

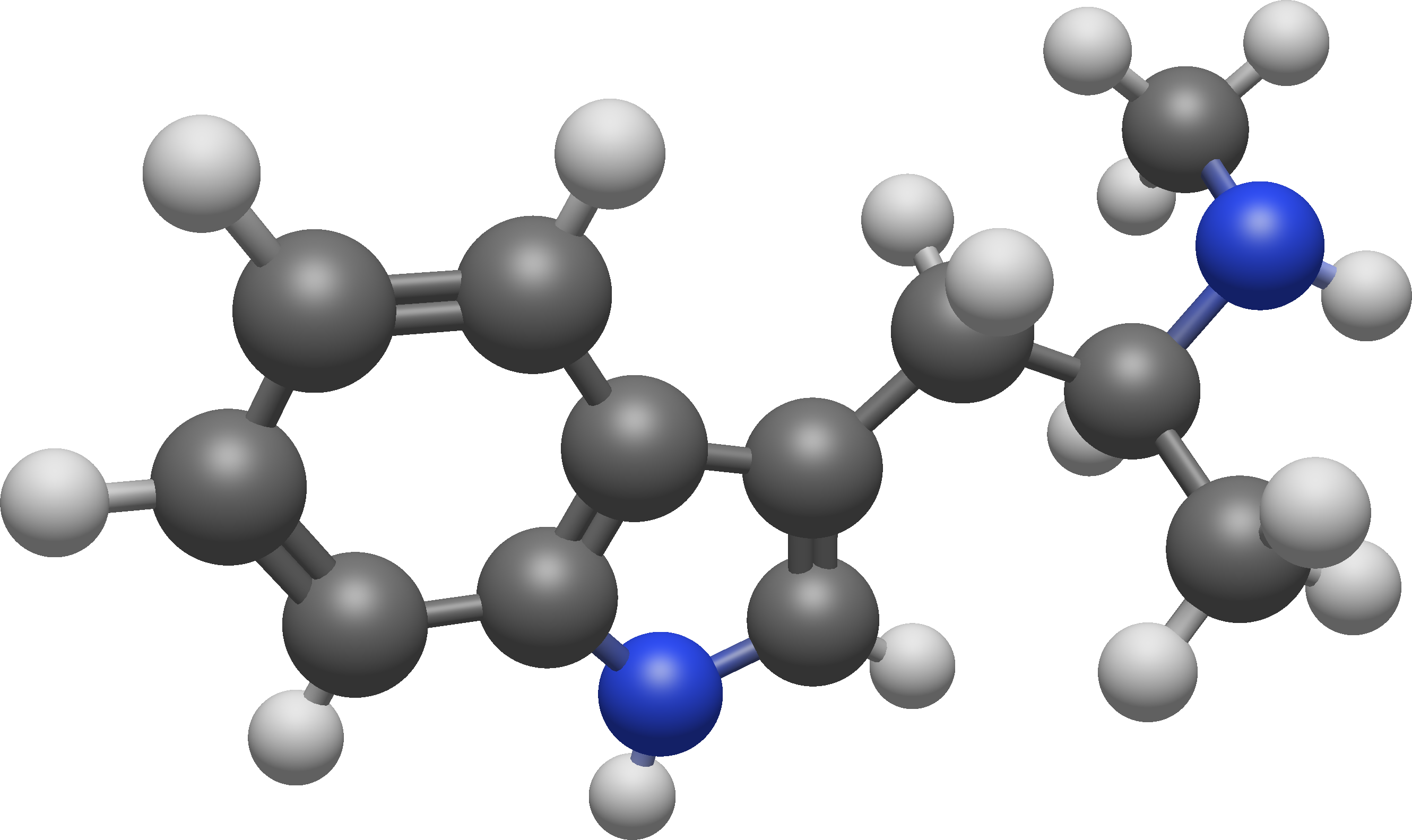

Clinical data
- Other names: α,N-Dimethyltryptamine; α,N-DMT; N-Methyl-α-methyltryptamine; N-Methyl-αMT; N-Methyl-AMT; NM-AMT; NM-αMT; Methamtryptamine; SK&F-7024; SKF-7024; Ro 3-1715; RO-3-1715
- Routes of administration: Oral

Identifiers
- IUPAC name: 1-(1H-indol-3-yl)-N-methylpropan-2-amine
- CAS Number: 299-24-1
- PubChem CID: 3724428
- ChemSpider: 2955156
- UNII: L8WKV7YXX3
- ChEBI: CHEBI:59024

Chemical and physical data
- Formula: C_{12}H_{16}N_{2}
- Molar mass: 188.274 g·mol^{−1}
- 3D model (JSmol): Interactive image
- SMILES: c1cccc2c1c(c[nH]2)CC(NC)C
- InChI: InChI=1S/C12H16N2/c1-9(13-2)7-10-8-14-12-6-4-3-5-11(10)12/h3-6,8-9,13-14H,7H2,1-2H3; Key:HUWIYJREHSBOEO-UHFFFAOYSA-N

α,N-Dimethyltryptamine (α,N-DMT; developmental code names SK&F-7024, Ro 3-1715), also known as N-methyl-α-methyltryptamine (N-methyl-αMT), is a lesser-known substituted tryptamine and psychoactive drug. It is the α,N-dimethyl positional isomer of N,N-dimethyltryptamine (N,N-DMT).

== Use and effects ==
α,N-DMT was synthesized and assessed by Alexander Shulgin. In his book TiHKAL (Tryptamines I Have Known and Loved), Shulgin lists the route as oral, the dosage as 50 to 100 mg, and the duration as 6 to 8 hours. It seemed to produce some stimulant-like effects but no apparent euphoric, entactogenic, or psychedelic effects. α,N-DMT also caused an unpleasant body load.

== Pharmacology ==
=== Pharmacodynamics ===
Very little data exists about the pharmacological properties, metabolism, and toxicity of α,N-DMT. α,N-DMT is known to be a potent monoamine oxidase inhibitor and tryptamine or serotonin receptor antagonist. Close analogues of α,N-DMT, such as α-methyltryptamine (αMT), are known to act as monoamine releasing agents and serotonin receptor agonists.

== Chemistry ==
α,N-DMT is the N-methylated analogue of αMT. There are notable parallels between the substituted tryptamines and substituted phenethylamines in this area in that α,N-DMT is to αMT as methamphetamine (N-methyl-α-methylphenethylamine) is to amphetamine (α-methylphenethylamine).

=== Synthesis ===
The chemical synthesis of α,N-DMT has been described.

=== Analogues ===
Analogues of α,N-DMT include α-methyltryptamine (AMT), α,N,N-TMT (N,N-dimethyl-AMT), α-methylserotonin (AMS; 5-HO-AMT), α,N,O-TMS (5-methoxy-N-methyl-AMT), α,N,N,O-TeMS (5-methoxy-N,N-dimethyl-AMT), IPAP (α,N-DPT), and BK-NM-AMT (β-keto-N-methyl-AMT), among others.

== See also ==
- Substituted α-alkyltryptamine
