= Α,N,O-TMS =

Chemical compound

α,N,O-TMS

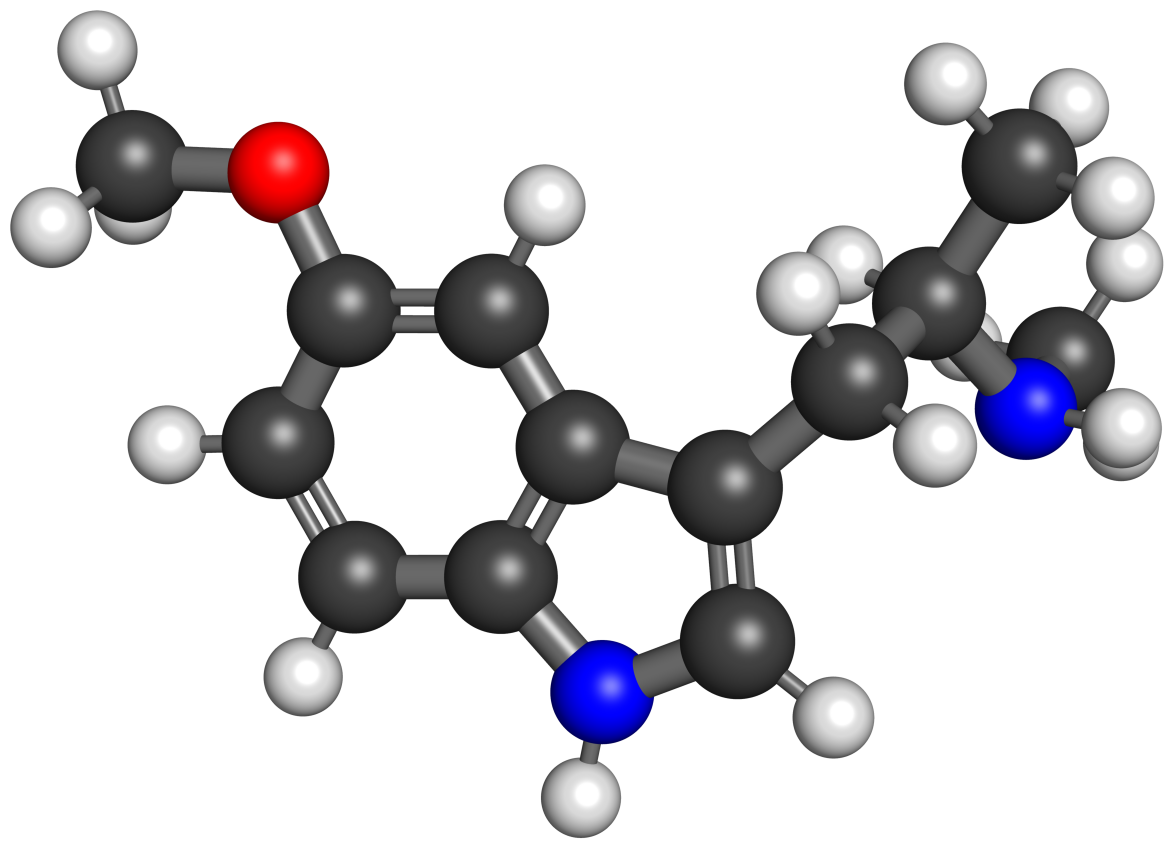

Clinical data
- Other names: α,N,O-Trimethylserotonin; α,N,O-TMS; 5-Methoxy-α,N-dimethyltryptamine; 5-MeO-α,N-DMT; 5-MeO-α-Me-NMT; N-Methyl-5-MeO-AMT; 5-MeO-ADMT
- Routes of administration: Oral
- ATC code: None

Pharmacokinetic data
- Duration of action: 6–8 hours

Identifiers
- IUPAC name: [1-(5-methoxy-1H-indol-3-yl)propan-2-yl](methyl)amine
- CAS Number: 4822-13-3
- PubChem CID: 20961
- ChemSpider: 19718
- UNII: PJ8WT93MNQ

Chemical and physical data
- Formula: C_{13}H_{18}N_{2}O
- Molar mass: 218.300 g·mol^{−1}
- 3D model (JSmol): Interactive image
- SMILES: O(c1cc2c(cc1)[nH]cc2CC(NC)C)C
- InChI: InChI=1S/C13H18N2O/c1-9(14-2)6-10-8-15-13-5-4-11(16-3)7-12(10)13/h4-5,7-9,14-15H,6H2,1-3H3; Key:IYEMYZOLBLHKFE-UHFFFAOYSA-N

α,N,O-Trimethylserotonin (α,N,O-TMS), also known as 5-methoxy-α,N-dimethyltryptamine (5-MeO-α,N-DMT), is a psychedelic drug of the tryptamine and α-alkyltryptamine families. It is taken orally.

== Use and effects ==
In his book TiHKAL (Tryptamines I Have Known and Loved), Shulgin lists the dose as 10 to 20 mg orally and the duration as 6 to 8 hours. The drug is significantly less potent than its non-N-methylated parent compound 5-MeO-AMT (5-methoxy-α-methyltryptamine), which has a dose range of 2.5 to 4.5 mg and a duration of 12 to 18 hours.

== Chemistry ==
=== Synthesis ===
The chemical synthesis of α,N,O-TMS has been described.

=== Analogues ===
Analogues of α,N,O-TMS (N-methyl-5-MeO-AMT) include α-methyltryptamine (AMT), α,N-DMT (N-methyl-AMT), α,N,N-TMT (N,N-dimethyl-AMT), α-methylserotonin (AMS; 5-HO-AMT), 5-MeO-AMT (α,O-DMS), and α,N,N,O-TeMS (N,N-dimethyl-5-MeO-AMT), among others.

== See also ==
- Substituted α-alkyltryptamine
