= 7,N,N-TMT =

Chemical compound

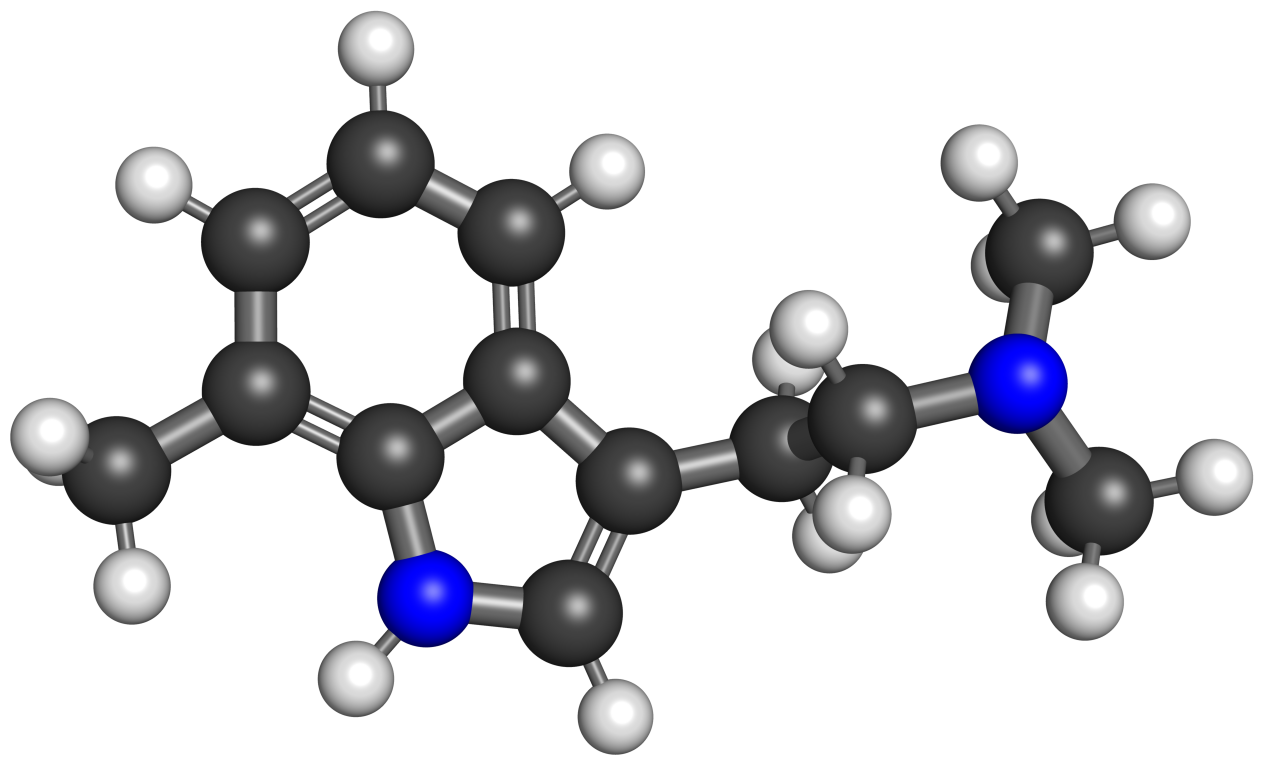

Clinical data
- Other names: 7,N,N-Trimethyltryptamine; 7,N,N-TMT; 7-TMT; 7-Methyl-N,N-dimethyltryptamine; 7-Methyl-DMT; 7-Me-DMT
- Drug class: Serotonin receptor modulator; Serotonergic psychedelic; Hallucinogen

Identifiers
- IUPAC name: 2-(7-methyl-1H-indol-3-yl)-N,N-dimethylethanamine
- CAS Number: 65882-39-5
- PubChem CID: 47747
- ChemSpider: 43445
- UNII: F9R59MT42E
- ChEMBL: ChEMBL20167
- CompTox Dashboard (EPA): DTXSID50216078

Chemical and physical data
- Formula: C_{13}H_{18}N_{2}
- Molar mass: 202.301 g·mol^{−1}
- 3D model (JSmol): Interactive image
- SMILES: CC1=C(NC=C2CCN(C)C)C2=CC=C1
- InChI: InChI=1S/C13H18N2/c1-10-5-4-6-12-11(7-8-15(2)3)9-14-13(10)12/h4-6,9,14H,7-8H2,1-3H3; Key:PQSFTUCFMWBITK-UHFFFAOYSA-N

7,N,N-trimethyltryptamine (7,N,N-TMT or 7-TMT), also known as 7-methyl-DMT, is a serotonin receptor modulator and psychedelic drug of the tryptamine family related to dimethyltryptamine (DMT). It was first described by 1978 and was encountered online as a novel designer drug in 2024.

== Use and effects ==
7-Methyl-DMT was not included nor mentioned in Alexander Shulgin's book TiHKAL (Tryptamines I Have Known and Loved).

== Pharmacology ==
=== Pharmacodynamics ===
7-TMT acts as an agonist of 5-HT_{2} receptors. In animal tests, both 7-TMT and its 5-methoxy derivative 5-MeO-7-TMT produced behavioural responses similar to those of psychedelic drugs such as DMT, but the larger 7-ethyl and 7-bromo derivatives of DMT did not produce psychedelic responses despite having higher 5-HT_{2} receptor affinity in vitro (cf. DOBU, DOAM). 7-TMT also weakly inhibits reuptake of serotonin but with little effect on dopamine or noradrenaline reuptake.

== Chemistry ==
=== Synthesis ===
The chemical synthesis of 7,N,N-TMT has been described.

=== Analogues ===
Analogues of 7-methyl-DMT include 7-methyltryptamine, dimethyltryptamine (DMT), 5-MeO-7-TMT (5-MeO-7,N,N-TMT), 7-MeO-DMT, 7-hydroxy-DMT, 7-methyl-AET, 7-MeO-DiPT, 7-MeO-MiPT, 7-chloro-AMT, 1-methyl-DMT, 2-methyl-DMT, 4-methyl-DMT, 5-methyl-DMT, and 6-methyl-DMT, among others.

== History ==
7,N,N-TMT was first described in the scientific literature by Richard Glennon and colleagues by 1978. It was encountered online as a novel designer drug in 2024.

== See also ==
- Substituted tryptamine
