= 4-Methyl-α-ethyltryptamine =

Chemical compound

Clinical data
- Other names: 4-Methyl-AET; 4-Methyl-αET; 4-Me-AET; 4-Me-αET
- ATC code: None

Legal status
- Legal status: Illegal in Singapore

Identifiers
- IUPAC name: 1-(4-methyl-1H-indol-3-yl)butan-2-amine
- CAS Number: 28289-30-7
- PubChem CID: 57466062
- ChemSpider: 26234938
- UNII: SBF4N6JJ4L
- CompTox Dashboard (EPA): DTXSID20726715

Chemical and physical data
- Formula: C_{13}H_{18}N_{2}
- Molar mass: 202.301 g·mol^{−1}
- 3D model (JSmol): Interactive image
- SMILES: Cc2c1c(CC(N)CC)c[nH]c1ccc2
- InChI: InChI=1S/C13H18N2/c1-3-11(14)7-10-8-15-12-6-4-5-9(2)13(10)12/h4-6,8,11,15H,3,7,14H2,1-2H3; Key:XKHCIOVNXOVPIK-UHFFFAOYSA-N

4-Methyl-α-ethyltryptamine (4-Me-αET) is a drug of the tryptamine and α-alkyltryptamine families. It is a designer drug and has been sold online as a "research chemical".

== Chemistry ==
=== Analogues ===
Analogues of 4-methyl-AET include α-ethyltryptamine (AET), 4-methyl-AMT, 4-methyl-DMT, 5-fluoro-AET, 7-methyl-AET, 7-chloro-AMT, and RS134-49 (4-methyl-THPI), among others.

== Society and culture ==
=== Legal status ===
==== Singapore ====
4-Me-AET is illegal in Singapore.

== See also ==
- Substituted α-alkyltryptamine
