= 7-Hydroxy-DMT =

Clinical data
- Other names: 7-HO-DMT; 7-OH-DMT; 7-Hydroxy-N,N-dimethyltryptamine
- Drug class: Serotonin receptor modulator
- ATC code: None

Identifiers
- IUPAC name: 3-[2-(dimethylamino)ethyl]-1H-indol-7-ol
- CAS Number: 7578-26-9
- PubChem CID: 23757258
- ChemSpider: 45558692
- CompTox Dashboard (EPA): DTXSID70635863

Chemical and physical data
- Formula: C_{12}H_{16}N_{2}O
- Molar mass: 204.273 g·mol^{−1}
- 3D model (JSmol): Interactive image
- SMILES: CN(C)CCC1=CNC2=C1C=CC=C2O
- InChI: InChI=1S/C12H16N2O/c1-14(2)7-6-9-8-13-12-10(9)4-3-5-11(12)15/h3-5,8,13,15H,6-7H2,1-2H3; Key:FZFHBMMTKKWEQH-UHFFFAOYSA-N

7-Hydroxy-DMT (7-HO-DMT), also known as 7-hydroxy-N,N-dimethyltryptamine, is a serotonin receptor modulator of the tryptamine family related to dimethyltryptamine (DMT). It is the 7-hydroxy derivative of DMT and is a positional isomer of psilocin (4-HO-DMT), bufotenin (5-HO-DMT), and 6-HO-DMT. The drug shows affinity for serotonin receptors in the rat fundus strip. However, it had the lowest serotonin receptor affinity of any other assessed compounds in a series of assessed tryptamines. In a later study, its affinity (K_{i}) for the serotonin 5-HT_{2A} receptor was >10,000 nM. 7-Hydroxy-DMT is said to be biologically active in animals but to show low potency. The drug was first described in the scientific literature by at least 1962. It is a Schedule I controlled substance in the United States as a positional isomer of psilocin.

== See also ==
- Substituted tryptamine
- 4-Hydroxy-DMT (psilocin)
- 5-Hydroxy-DMT (bufotenin)
- 6-Hydroxy-DMT
- 7-Hydroxytryptamine
