= Methylserotonin =

Methylserotonin, or methyl-5-hydroxytryptamine (methyl-5-HT), may refer to:

- 5-Methoxytryptamine (5-MeO-T; O-methylserotonin; O-Me-5-HT)
- 2-Methyl-5-hydroxytryptamine (2-Me-5-HT; 2-methylserotonin)
- α-Methylserotonin (α-methyl-5-hydroxytryptamine; α-methyl-5-HT; α-Me-5-HT)
- N-Methylserotonin (NMS; N-methyl-5-hydroxytryptamine; N-Me-5-HT)

== See also ==
- Substituted tryptamine
- Dimethylserotonin
- Trimethylserotonin
- Tetramethylserotonin
- Methyltryptamine
- Methyl-DMT
- Methylpsilocin
- Methyl-5-MeO-DMT
