= 5-Methoxy-7,N,N-trimethyltryptamine =

Chemical compound

5-MeO-7,N,N-TMT

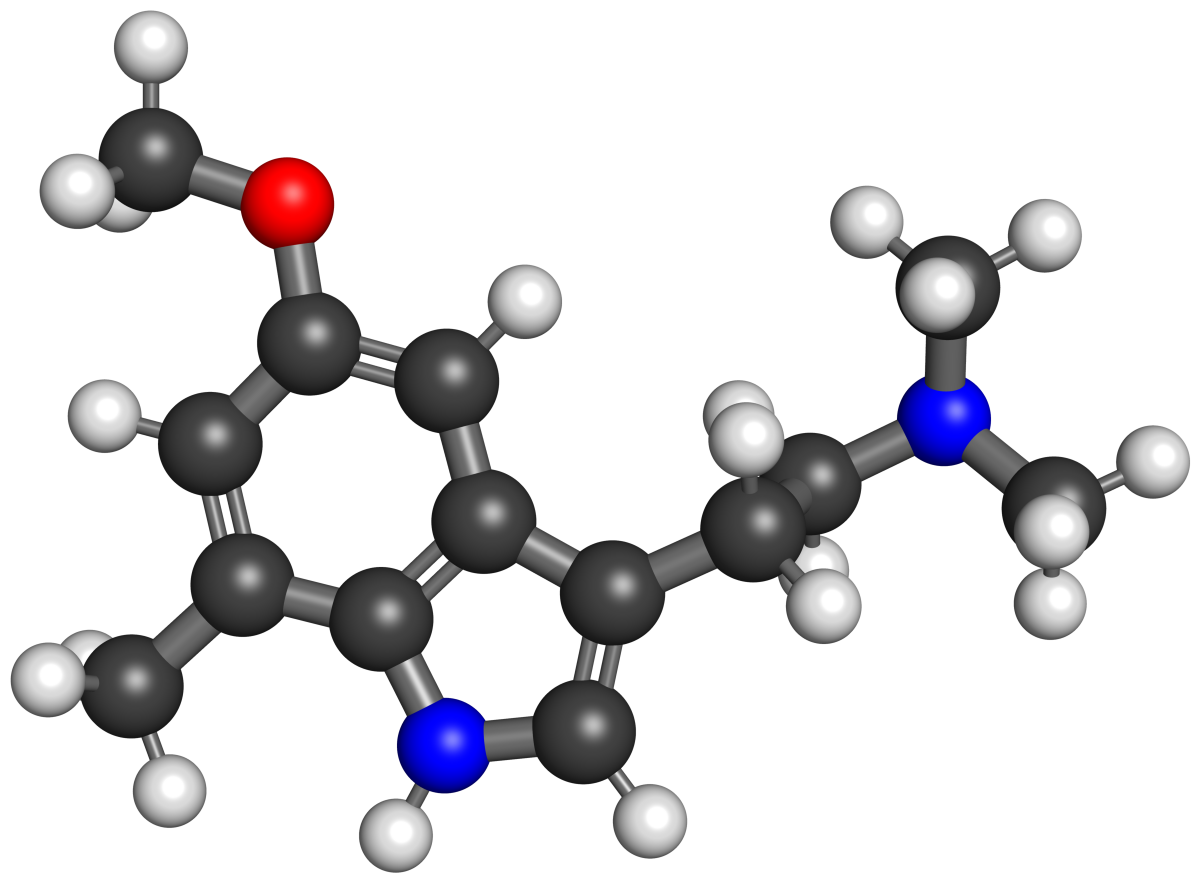

Clinical data
- Other names: 5-MeO-7,N,N-TMT; 5-MeO-7-TMT; 7-Me-5-MeO-DMT; 7-Methyl-5-MeO-DMT

Identifiers
- IUPAC name: 2-(5-Methoxy-7-methyl-1H-indol-3-yl)-N,N-dimethylethanamine
- CAS Number: 61018-77-7 freebase 74798-76-8 oxalate salt
- PubChem CID: 12338919
- ChemSpider: 10578304
- UNII: JC6AF6KXW9
- ChEMBL: ChEMBL20243
- CompTox Dashboard (EPA): DTXSID40491731

Chemical and physical data
- Formula: C_{14}H_{20}N_{2}O
- Molar mass: 232.327 g·mol^{−1}
- 3D model (JSmol): Interactive image
- SMILES: CC1=C(NC=C2CCN(C)C)C2=CC(OC)=C1
- InChI: InChI=1S/C14H20N2O/c1-10-7-12(17-4)8-13-11(5-6-16(2)3)9-15-14(10)13/h7-9,15H,5-6H2,1-4H3; Key:YGAOMGVUIWNFMD-UHFFFAOYSA-N

5-Methoxy-7,N,N-trimethyltryptamine (5-MeO-7,N,N-TMT, 5-MeO-7-TMT), also known as 7-Me-5-MeO-DMT, is a tryptamine derivative which acts as a partial agonist at the 5-HT_{2} serotonin receptors, with an EC_{50} of 63.9 nM and an efficacy of 66.2% at 5-HT_{2A} (vs 5-HT), and weaker activity at 5-HT_{2B} and 5-HT_{2C}. In animal tests, both 7,N,N-TMT and 5-MeO-7,N,N-TMT produced behavioural responses similar to those of psychedelic drugs such as DMT and 5-MeO-DMT, but compounds with larger 7-position substituents such as 7-ethyl-DMT and 7-bromo-DMT did not produce psychedelic-appropriate responding despite high 5-HT_{2} receptor binding affinity, suggesting these may be antagonists or weak partial agonists for the 5-HT_{2} receptors. The related compound 7-MeO-MiPT (cf. 5-MeO-MiPT) was also found to be inactive, suggesting that the 7-position has poor tolerance for bulky groups at this position, at least if agonist activity is desired.

== See also ==
- Substituted tryptamine
- 5-MeO-2-TMT
- 6-Me-5-MeO-DMT
- 7F-5-MeO-MET
- 7-Methyltryptamine
- 7-Methyl-DMT
- 7-Methylpsilocin
