= 7-MeO-DMT =

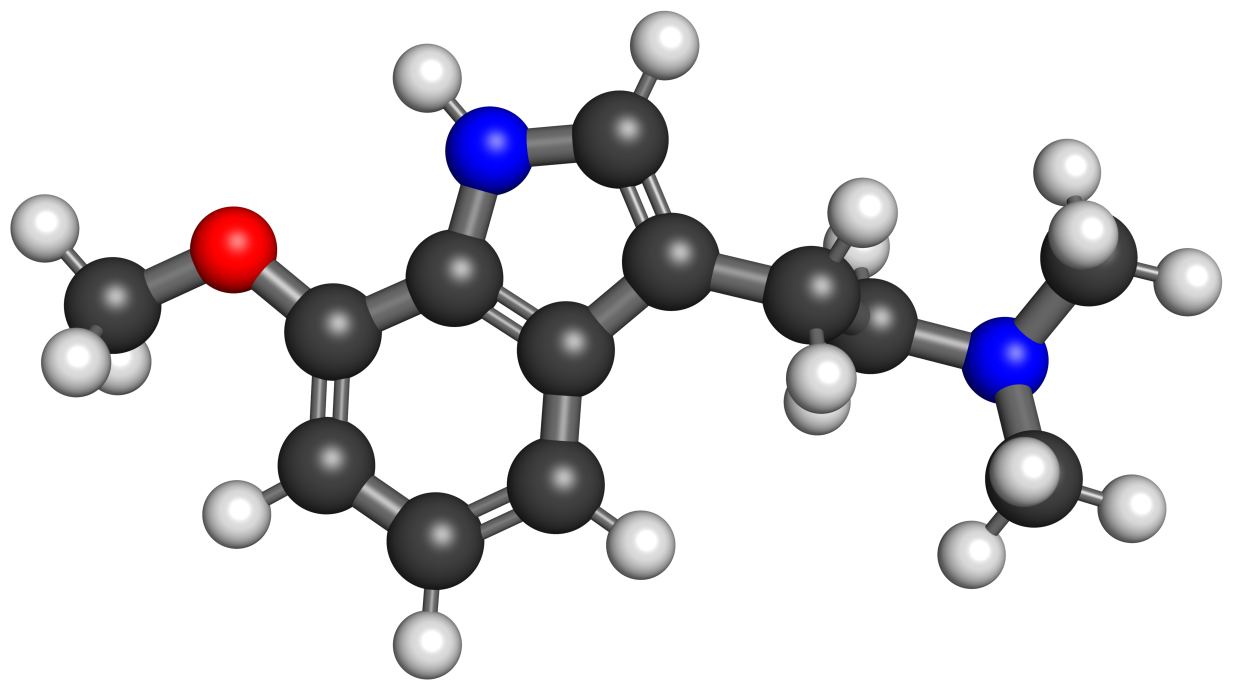

Clinical data
- Other names: 7-OMe-DMT; 7-Methoxy-DMT; 7-Methoxy-N,N-dimethyltryptamine
- Drug class: Serotonin receptor modulator; Possible serotonergic psychedelic or hallucinogen
- ATC code: None

Identifiers
- IUPAC name: 2-(7-methoxy-1H-indol-3-yl)-N,N-dimethylethanamine
- PubChem CID: 12017580
- ChemSpider: 23183416
- ChEMBL: ChEMBL97017

Chemical and physical data
- Formula: C_{13}H_{18}N_{2}O
- Molar mass: 218.300 g·mol^{−1}
- 3D model (JSmol): Interactive image
- SMILES: CN(C)CCC1=CNC2=C1C=CC=C2OC
- InChI: InChI=1S/C13H18N2O/c1-15(2)8-7-10-9-14-13-11(10)5-4-6-12(13)16-3/h4-6,9,14H,7-8H2,1-3H3; Key:GCEZYLSUTMYNRN-UHFFFAOYSA-N

7-MeO-DMT, or 7-OMe-DMT, also known as 7-methoxy-N,N-dimethyltryptamine, is a serotonin receptor modulator of the tryptamine family. It is the 7-methoxy derivative of the serotonergic psychedelic dimethyltryptamine (DMT) and is a positional isomer of 5-MeO-DMT, 4-MeO-DMT, and 6-MeO-DMT.

== Use and effects ==
7-MeO-DMT was only briefly mentioned in Alexander Shulgin's book TiHKAL (Tryptamines I Have Known and Loved) and its properties and effects were not described.

== Pharmacology ==
=== Pharmacodynamics ===
In an early study using the isolated rat stomach fundus strip, the drug showed very low serotonin receptor affinity (A_{2} = 4,677 nM) that was about 56-fold lower than that of 5-MeO-DMT. However, this assay was subsequently found to be an unreliable predictor of hallucinogenic activity. The receptor in this tissue may correspond to the serotonin 5-HT_{2B} receptor.

In subsequent studies, 7-MeO-DMT bound to the serotonin 5-HT_{2A} receptor (K_{i} = 5,400–5,440 nM) and had 9- to 59-fold lower affinity than 5-MeO-DMT and 5- to 17-fold lower affinity than DMT. It showed no detectable affinity for the serotonin 5-HT_{2C} receptor (K_{i} = >10,000 nM), but did show affinity for the serotonin 5-HT_{1A} receptor (K_{i} = 1,760 nM). Its affinity for the serotonin 5-HT_{1A} receptor was 160-fold lower than that of 5-MeO-DMT and was 9-fold lower than that of DMT. 7-MeO-DMT has also been assessed at the serotonin 5-HT_{1E} and 5-HT_{1F} receptors (K_{i} = >10,000 nM and 2,620 nM, respectively).

7-MeO-DMT substitutes for the atypical psychedelic 5-MeO-DMT in rodent drug discrimination tests. The drug was only briefly mentioned in Alexander Shulgin's 1997 book TiHKAL and is not known to have been tested in humans. Hence, it is unknown whether 7-MeO-DMT produces psychedelic effects in humans.

== Chemistry ==
=== Analogues ===
Analogues of 7-MeO-DMT include 7-methoxytryptamine, dimethyltryptamine (DMT), 4-MeO-DMT, 5-MeO-DMT, and 6-MeO-DMT, among others.

== History ==
7-MeO-DMT was first described in the scientific literature by at least 1968.

== Society and culture ==
=== Legal status ===
==== United States ====
7-MeO-DMT is not an explicitly controlled substance in the United States, but may be considered a Schedule I controlled substance in this country as it is a positional isomer of 5-MeO-DMT.

== See also ==
- Substituted tryptamine
