= Α,N,N,O-TeMS =

α,N,N,O-TeMS

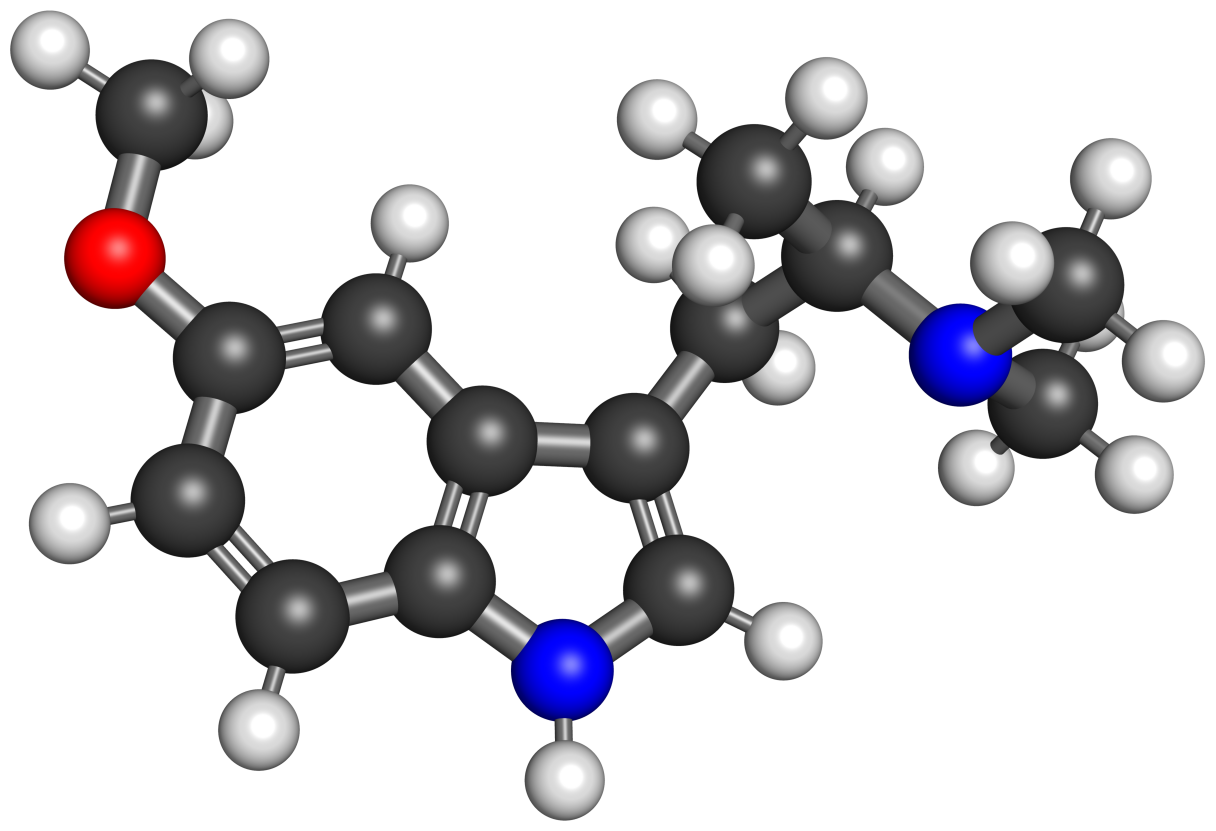

Clinical data
- Other names: 5-Methoxy-α-methyl-N,N-dimethyltryptamine; 5-Methoxy-α,N,N-trimethyltryptamine; α,N,N,O-Tetramethylserotonin; 5-MeO-α,N,N-TMT; 5-MeO-α-methyl-DMT; 5-MeO-α-Me-DMT; α,N,N,O-TeMS; N,N-Dimethyl-5-MeO-AMT

Identifiers
- IUPAC name: 1-(5-methoxy-1H-indol-3-yl)-N,N-dimethylpropan-2-amine
- CAS Number: 101831-90-7
- PubChem CID: 58946
- ChemSpider: 53134
- CompTox Dashboard (EPA): DTXSID90906668

Chemical and physical data
- Formula: C_{14}H_{20}N_{2}O
- Molar mass: 232.327 g·mol^{−1}
- 3D model (JSmol): Interactive image
- SMILES: CC(CC1=CNC2=C1C=C(C=C2)OC)N(C)C
- InChI: InChI=1S/C14H20N2O/c1-10(16(2)3)7-11-9-15-14-6-5-12(17-4)8-13(11)14/h5-6,8-10,15H,7H2,1-4H3; Key:WDKDEBAFCKHQPF-UHFFFAOYSA-N

α,N,N,O-Tetramethylserotonin (α,N,N,O-TeMS), also known as 5-methoxy-α,N,N-trimethyltryptamine (5-MeO-α,N,N-TMT), is a synthetic compound of the tryptamine, α-alkyltryptamine, and 5-methoxytryptamine families. It is the combined derivative of α-methyltryptamine (αMT) and 5-methoxy-N,N-dimethyltryptamine (5-MeO-DMT).

== Use and effects ==
α,N,N,O-TeMS was described by Alexander Shulgin in his book TiHKAL (Tryptamines I Have Known and Loved) as a putative psychedelic drug. However, Shulgin does not appear to have ever synthesized or assayed it. As such, α,N,N,O-TeMS's effects, dose, and duration are all unknown.

α,N,N,O-TeMS is the N,N-dimethylated derivative of 5-MeO-αMT (α,O-DMS) and the N-methylated derivative of 5-MeO-α,N-DMT (α,N,O-TMS). 5-MeO-α,N-DMT is less potent and shorter in duration than 5-MeO-αMT, with 5-MeO-α,N-DMT having a dose range of 10 to 20 mg and a duration of 6 to 8 hours versus 5-MeO-αMT having a dose range of 2.5 to 4.5 mg and a duration of 12 to 18 hours. Similarly, α,N-DMT (α,N-dimethyltryptamine) is less potent than αMT, with doses of 50 to 100 mg for α,N-DMT and doses of 15 to 30 mg for αMT. Hence, of potential relevance to α,N,N,O-TeMS, it appears that N-methylation of α-alkyltryptamines may reduce their activity by several-fold.

== Chemistry ==
Analogues of α,N,N,O-TeMS (N,N-dimethyl-5-MeO-AMT) include α-methyltryptamine (AMT), α,N-DMT (N-methyl-AMT), α,N,N-TMT (N,N-dimethyl-AMT), α-methylserotonin (5-HO-AMT), 5-MeO-AMT (α,O-DMS), and α,N,O-TMS (N-methyl-5-MeO-AMT), among others. Another compound, zalsupindole ((R)-N,N-dimethyl-5-MeO-isoAMT), is a close isotryptamine analogue of α,N,N,O-TeMS.

== History ==
α,N,N,O-TeMS was first described in the literature, specifically in TiHKAL, by 1997. It is known to have been made at Edgewood Arsenal, but the facility never published anything on the compound. α,N,N,O-TeMS does not appear to have been otherwise described in the literature.

== See also ==
- Substituted α-alkyltryptamine
