= 1-Methyltryptamine =

Clinical data
- Other names: 1-Methyl-T; 1-MT; 1-Me-T; 1-Me-tryptamine; PAL-637; PAL637
- Drug class: Serotonin receptor agonist; Serotonin releasing agent
- ATC code: None

Identifiers
- IUPAC name: 2-(1-methylindol-3-yl)ethanamine
- CAS Number: 7518-21-0 7088-88-2
- PubChem CID: 23492
- ChemSpider: 21963
- ChEBI: CHEBI:125627
- ChEMBL: ChEMBL3330641
- CompTox Dashboard (EPA): DTXSID80991164
- ECHA InfoCard: 100.028.525

Chemical and physical data
- Formula: C_{11}H_{14}N_{2}
- Molar mass: 174.247 g·mol^{−1}
- 3D model (JSmol): Interactive image
- SMILES: CN1C=C(C2=CC=CC=C21)CCN
- InChI: InChI=1S/C11H14N2/c1-13-8-9(6-7-12)10-4-2-3-5-11(10)13/h2-5,8H,6-7,12H2,1H3; Key:CAAGZPJPCKMFBD-UHFFFAOYSA-N

1-Methyltryptamine (1-methyl-T, 1-MT or 1-Me-T; code name PAL-637) is a serotonin receptor agonist and monoamine releasing agent of the tryptamine family. It is the 1-methyl derivative of tryptamine (T; PAL-235).

The drug is known to act as a serotonin 5-HT_{2A} receptor agonist (K_{i} = 473–6,590 nM; EC_{50} = 209–4,560 nM; E_{max} = 55–99%), as a serotonin releasing agent (EC_{50} = 53.1 nM), and to be inactive in inducing the release of norepinephrine and dopamine (EC_{50} = >10,000 nM). Its activities at other serotonin receptors were not reported. However, in another study, 1-methyltryptamine showed weak affinity for several other serotonin and related receptors. 1-Methyltryptamine shows dramatically reduced affinity and activational potency as well as reduced efficacy at the serotonin 5-HT_{2A} receptor compared to tryptamine (which showed K_{i} = 13.1 nM; EC_{50} = 7.36–99 nM; E_{max} = 101–104%). It also shows slightly reduced potency as a serotonin releasing agent and abolished activity as a releaser of norepinephrine and dopamine relative to tryptamine (which had EC_{50} = 32.6 nM, 716 nM, and 164 nM, respectively).

Analogues of 1-methyltryptamine, like 1-methylserotonin and 1-iPr-5-MeO-T, have been studied. Similarly to the case of 1-methyltryptamine contrasted with tryptamine, they show dramatically reduced affinities and activational potencies at the human serotonin 5-HT_{2A} receptor relative to their 1-unsubstituted counterparts (serotonin and 5-methoxytryptamine, respectively).

== See also ==
- Substituted tryptamine
- 1-Methyl-DMT
- 1-Methylpsilocin
- Lespedamine (1-methoxy-DMT)
- 1-Propyl-5-MeO-AMT
- O-4310 (1-isopropyl-6-fluoropsilocin)
- CP-132,484
- 2-Methyltryptamine
- 5-Methyltryptamine
