= 5-MeO-AMT =

Chemical compound

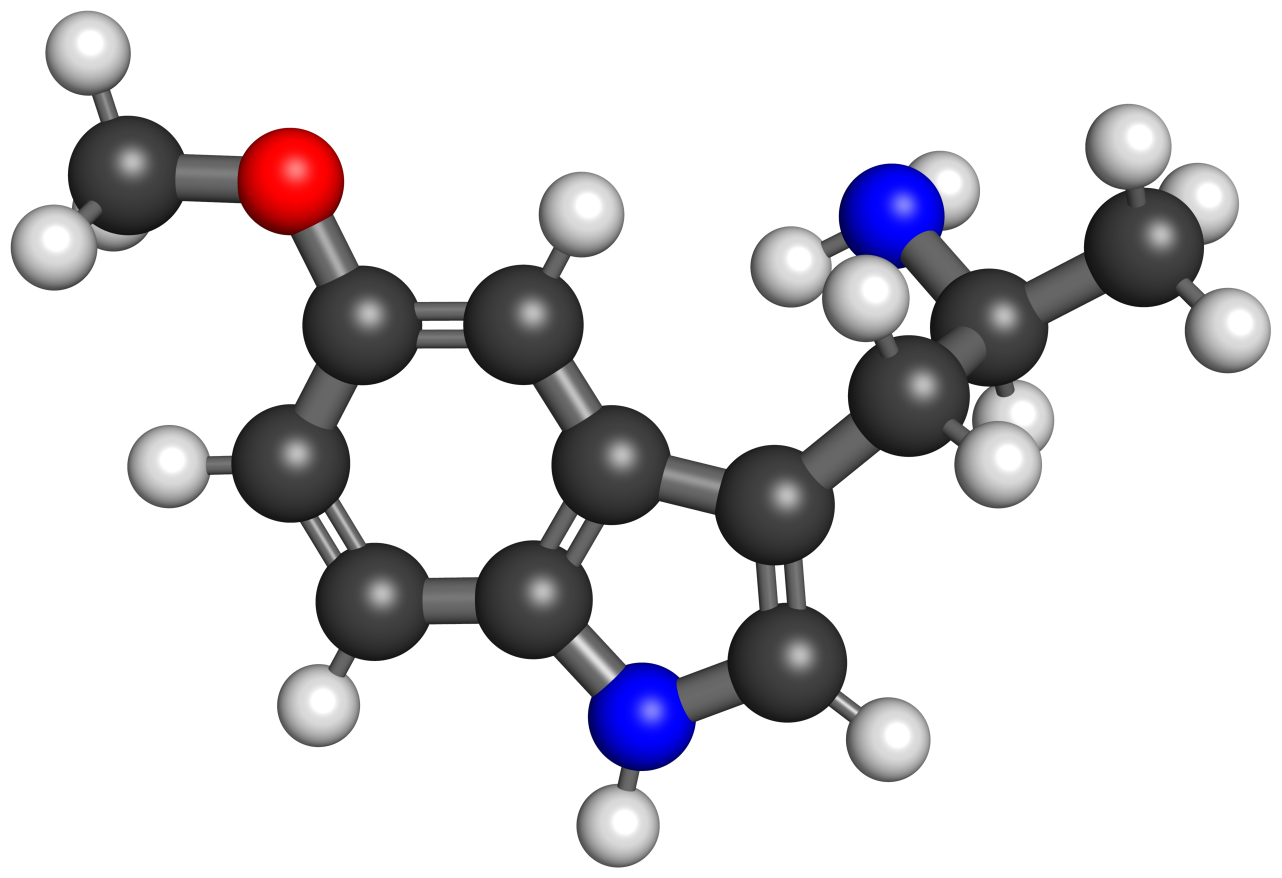

Clinical data
- Other names: 5-MeO-AMT; 5-Methoxy-α-methyltryptamine; α,O-Dimethylserotonin; α,O-DMS; Alpha-O
- Routes of administration: Oral
- Drug class: Serotonin receptor agonist; Serotonin 5-HT_{2A} receptor agonist; Serotonergic psychedelic; Hallucinogen
- ATC code: None

Legal status
- Legal status: AU: S9 (Prohibited substance); BR: Class F2 (Prohibited psychotropics); CA: Unscheduled; DE: NpSG (Industrial and scientific use only); UK: Class A; US: The DEA considers 5-MeO-AMT a controlled substance analogue.; Illegal in Sweden and Florida

Pharmacokinetic data
- Duration of action: 12–18 hours

Identifiers
- IUPAC name: 1-(5-methoxy-1H-indol-3-yl)propan-2-amine
- CAS Number: 1137-04-8
- PubChem CID: 36906
- ChemSpider: 33864
- UNII: U5XOB9AQ15
- ChEBI: CHEBI:125422
- ChEMBL: ChEMBL31115
- CompTox Dashboard (EPA): DTXSID60893758

Chemical and physical data
- Formula: C_{12}H_{16}N_{2}O
- Molar mass: 204.273 g·mol^{−1}
- 3D model (JSmol): Interactive image
- Melting point: 216 to 218 °C (421 to 424 °F)
- SMILES: N[C@@H](C)CC1=CNC(C=C2)=C1C=C2OC
- InChI: InChI=1S/C12H16N2O/c1-8(13)5-9-7-14-12-4-3-10(15-2)6-11(9)12/h3-4,6-8,14H,5,13H2,1-2H3; Key:OGNJZVNNKBZFRM-UHFFFAOYSA-N

5-MeO-αMT, also known as 5-methoxy-α-methyltryptamine or as α,O-dimethylserotonin (α,O-DMS or Alpha-O), is a psychedelic drug of the tryptamine, α-alkyltryptamine, and 5-methoxytryptamine families. It is a derivative of α-methyltryptamine (αMT) and an analogue of 5-MeO-DMT. The drug is said to be the most potent psychedelic of the methoxytryptamine class. It is taken orally and is used at doses of 2 to 4 mg.

== Use and effects ==
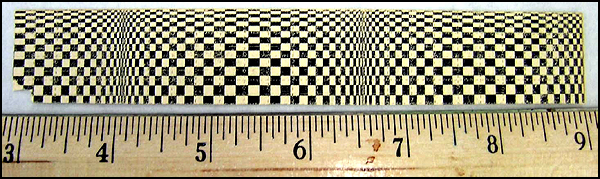
5-MeO-AMT blotters.

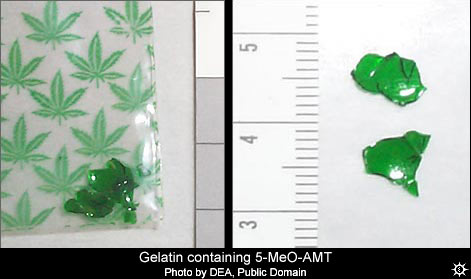
Counterfeit LSD gelatin tabs containing 5-MeO-AMT.

In his book TiHKAL (Tryptamines I Have Known and Loved), Alexander Shulgin lists the dose range of 5-MeO-AMT (for which he refers to as a,O-DMS) as 2.5 to 4.5 mg and its duration as 12 to 18 hours. However, a wider dose range of 0.5 to 15 mg has also been reported.

5-MeO-AMT has supposedly been sold as 4 mg tablets by the street name Alpha-O and taken as a recreational drug. Since the DEA arrest of the William Leonard Pickard group in 2000, 5-MeO-AMT may have occasionally been sold mislabeled as LSD in liquid, sugar cube, or blotter form, though this may be due to DEA reports.

== Overdose ==
If misrepresented as LSD, 5-MeO-AMT can be extremely dangerous; users may take a number of "hits" of 5-MeO-AMT, assuming that it is LSD. Unlike LSD, which is very safe in overdose, 5-MeO-AMT can be very harmful or fatal. Particularly sensitive individuals can experience symptoms of overdose at dosages in the normal (for most users) range — as low as 20 mg. This has led to at least a few hospitalizations and possibly more than one death. It is likely that the overdose potential of the compound is due to unwanted sympathomimetic effects, as the side effects noted in overdose cases include cardiac arrhythmia and seizure. It also seems that oral consumption is safer than insufflation.

Gloria Discerni, 18, died after overdosing on a drug initially believed to be LSD. Authorities learned months later that the drug wasn't LSD (which is not deadly in overdose) but a "designer drug" identified as 5-MeO-AMT.

== Pharmacology ==
=== Pharmacodynamics ===
5-MeO-AMT activities
Target	Affinity (K_{i}, nM)
5-HT_{1A}	46–194 (K_{i}); 680 (EC_{50}); 101% (E_{max})
5-HT_{1B}	417 (rat)
5-HT_{2A}	3.1–34 (K_{i}); 2–8.4 (EC_{50}); 84% (E_{max})
5-HT_{2B}	4 (EC_{50})
5-HT_{2C}	90
α_{1A}	>12,000
α_{2A}	11,000
D_{1}	>25,000
D_{2}	>25,000
D_{3}	>25,000
H_{1}	>25,000
TAAR_{1}	1,100 (K_{i}) (rat); 4,800 (K_{i}) (mouse) >10,000 (EC_{50}) (human)
SERT	8,270–12,000 (K_{i}); 1,980–17,000 (IC_{50}); 460 (EC_{50})
NET	>22,000 (K_{i}); 37,000–78,000 (IC_{50}); 8,900 (EC_{50})
DAT	>26,000 (K_{i}); 2,690–43,000 (IC_{50}); 1,500 (EC_{50})
MAO-A	31,000 (IC_{50})
Notes: The smaller the value, the more avidly the drug binds to the site. All proteins are human unless otherwise specified. Refs:

5-MeO-AMT acts as a non-selective serotonin receptor agonist, including of the serotonin 5-HT_{1A}, 5-HT_{2A}, and 5-HT_{2B} receptors, among others. Its EC_{50} at the serotonin 5-HT_{2A} receptor has been found to be 2 to 8.4 nM. In relation to this, it is an extremely potent agonist of the serotonin 5-HT_{2A} receptor in vitro, showing the highest potency of any other tryptamine assessed in one study. Its potency in activating the serotonin 5-HT_{2A} receptor was 38-fold higher than that of dimethyltryptamine (DMT) and 361-fold higher than that of psilocin in the same study. It is also a highly potent agonist of the serotonin 5-HT_{2B} receptor, with an EC_{50} of 4 nM.

Whereas tryptamine, serotonin (5-hydroxytryptamine), and αMT show potent activity as monoamine releasing agents, including of serotonin, norepinephrine, and/or dopamine, the monoamine-releasing activity of 5-methoxylated tryptamine derivatives, like 5-methoxytryptamine, 5-MeO-NMT, and 5-MeO-DMT among others, is dramatically reduced or abolished. Accordingly, whereas the EC_{50} values of αMT for induction of monoamine release are 22 to 68 nM for serotonin, 79 to 112 nM for norepinephrine, and 79 to 180 nM for dopamine, the EC_{50} values in the case of 5-MeO-AMT are 460 nM for serotonin, 8,900 nM for norepinephrine, and 1,500 nM for dopamine. Similarly, it is of very low potency as a monoamine reuptake inhibitor (IC_{50} values >1,000 nM). Considering the very high potency of 5-MeO-AMT in activating the serotonin 5-HT_{2A} receptor, its weak activities as a monoamine releasing agent and reuptake inhibitor are of questionable significance.

5-MeO-AMT is a weak monoamine oxidase A (MAO-A) inhibitor, with an IC_{50} of 31,000 nM. For comparison, the IC_{50} of AMT for MAO-A inhibition was 380 nM (~82-fold more potent than 5-MeO-AMT) and the IC_{50} values of amphetamine (and its enantiomers) for MAO-A inhibition have been reported to be 11,000 to 70,000 nM.

5-MeO-AMT produces the head-twitch response, a behavioral proxy of psychedelic effects, in rodents, and this is reversed by the serotonin 5-HT_{2A} receptor antagonist ketanserin. It substitutes for other psychedelics such as DOM and LSD in animal drug discrimination tests, but does not substitute for entactogens like MDMA or psychostimulants like dextromethamphetamine or cocaine. In contrast to other psychedelics, 5-MeO-AMT has been found to not fully substitute for other psychedelics including DOM, LSD, and dimethyltryptamine (DMT), but did partially generalize to LSD (67% responding). This is analogous to findings with 5-MeO-DMT, which has a major serotonin 5-HT_{2A} receptor-mediated component to its discriminative stimulus properties. 5-MeO-AMT does not produce locomotor hyperactivity, behavioral sensitization, conditioned place preference, or self-administration, further indicating a lack of psychostimulant-like effects as well as misuse potential. Instead, 5-MeO-AMT produces hypolocomotion. 5-MeO-AMT is known to produce sympathomimetic effects, but these effects likely depend on serotonin 5-HT_{2A} receptor activation rather than on monoamine release or reuptake inhibition. Other serotonergic psychedelics are also well known to produce sympathomimetic effects.

== Chemistry ==
5-MeO-AMT, also known as 5-methoxy-α-methyltryptamine, is a substituted tryptamine derivative. It is a derivative of tryptamine (T), 5-methoxytryptamine (5-MeO-T or 5-MT), and α-methyltryptamine (AMT or αMT) and is an analogue of other tryptamines like α-methylserotonin (5-HO-AMT) and 5-MeO-DMT. Some derivatives of 5-MeO-AMT include α,N-dimethyl-5-methoxytryptamine (5-MeO-α-Me-NMT or α,N,O-TMS) and α,N,N-trimethyl-5-methoxytryptamine (5-MeO-α-Me-DMT or α,N,N,O-TMS). As noted by Alexander Shulgin, the α-methylated tryptamines can be seen at as the tryptamine homologues of the amphetamines (α-methylated phenethylamines).

=== Properties ===
5-MeO-AMT is soluble in water and ethanol but not in ether.

=== Synthesis ===
The chemical synthesis of 5-MeO-AMT has been described.

=== Analogues ===
Analogues of 5-MeO-AMT include α-methyltryptamine (AMT), 4-HO-AMT, α-methylserotonin (5-HO-AMT), 5-EtO-AMT, 5-AlO-AMT, 5-fluoro-AMT, 5-chloro-AMT, α,N,O-TMS (5-MeO-N-Me-AMT), α,N,N,O-TeMS (5-MeO-α,N,N-TMT), 5-MeO-DMT, 5-MeO-DPT, 5-MeO-DiPT, O-methyl-AL-34662 (indazole-5-MeO-AMT), and zalsupindole ((R)-N,N-dimethyl-5-MeO-isoAMT), among others.

== History ==
5-MeO-AMT was first synthesized and described in the scientific literature in 1958. Its psychedelic effects in humans were first observed in 1976 and were described by Alexander Shulgin and David E. Nichols and colleagues by 1978.

== Society and culture ==
=== Legal status ===
==== Australia ====
5-MeO-AMT is considered a Schedule 9 prohibited substance in Australia under the Poisons Standard (October 2015). A Schedule 9 substance is a substance which may be abused or misused, the manufacture, possession, sale or use of which should be prohibited by law except when required for medical or scientific research, or for analytical, teaching or training purposes with approval of Commonwealth and/or State or Territory Health Authorities.

==== Canada ====
5-MeO-AMT is not a controlled substance in Canada as of 2025.

==== Finland ====
5-MeO-AMT is scheduled in the "government decree on psychoactive substances banned from the consumer market".

==== Sweden ====
Sveriges riksdags health ministry Statens folkhälsoinstitut classified 5-MeO-αMT as "health hazard" under the act Lagen om förbud mot vissa hälsofarliga varor (translated Act on the Prohibition of Certain Goods Dangerous to Health) as of Oct 1, 2004, in their regulation SFS 2004:696 listed as 5-metoxi-alfametyltryptamin (5-MeO-AMT), making it illegal to sell or possess.

==== United Kingdom ====
5-MeO-αMT was made illegal in the United Kingdom as of 7 January 2015, along with 5-MeO-DALT. This was following the events of 10 June 2014 when the Advisory Council on the Misuse of Drugs recommended that 5-MeO-αMT be scheduled as a class A drug by updating the blanket ban clause on tryptamines.

==== United States ====
5-MeO-AMT is unscheduled at the federal level in the United States. However, it may be considered a controlled substance under the Federal Analogue Act as an analogue of schedule psychedelics like AMT and 5-MeO-DMT, but only if it is intended for human consumption.

===== Florida =====
5-MeO-AMT is a Schedule I controlled substance in the state of Florida, making it illegal to buy, sell, or possess.

== See also ==
- Substituted α-alkyltryptamine
