= 7-Methyltryptamine =

Clinical data
- Other names: 7-Methyl-T; 7-MT; 7-Me-T; PAL-286; PAL286
- Drug class: Serotonin receptor modulator; Serotonin 5-HT_{2A} receptor agonist; Serotonin releasing agent
- ATC code: None

Identifiers
- IUPAC name: 2-(7-methyl-1H-indol-3-yl)ethanamine
- CAS Number: 14490-05-2
- PubChem CID: 26714
- ChemSpider: 24888
- UNII: C8Q3W2622L
- ChEMBL: ChEMBL204839
- CompTox Dashboard (EPA): DTXSID70162841
- ECHA InfoCard: 100.034.983

Chemical and physical data
- Formula: C_{11}H_{14}N_{2}
- Molar mass: 174.247 g·mol^{−1}
- 3D model (JSmol): Interactive image
- SMILES: CC1=C2C(=CC=C1)C(=CN2)CCN
- InChI: InChI=1S/C11H14N2/c1-8-3-2-4-10-9(5-6-12)7-13-11(8)10/h2-4,7,13H,5-6,12H2,1H3; Key:SGGBZKQTWMKXHD-UHFFFAOYSA-N

7-Methyltryptamine (7-Me-T or 7-methyl-T; developmental code name PAL-286) is a serotonin receptor modulator and monoamine releasing agent of the tryptamine family. It is the 7-methyl derivative of tryptamine.

The drug acts as a potent full agonist of the serotonin 5-HT_{2A} receptor, with an EC_{50} of 44.7 nM and an E_{max} of 103%. It shows 6-fold lower potency as a serotonin 5-HT_{2A} receptor agonist compared to tryptamine itself. 7-Methyltryptamine also shows affinity for the serotonin 5-HT_{1D} receptor, but has greatly reduced affinity compared to tryptamine (IC_{50} = 1,900 nM and 57 nM, respectively; 33-fold lower). It shows extremely weak affinity for the dizocilpine (MK-801) site of the NMDA receptor (IC_{50} = ~650,000 nM). In addition to its serotonin 5-HT_{2A} receptor agonism, 7-methyltryptamine is a serotonin releasing agent (SRA), with EC_{50} values for induction of monoamine release of 23.7 nM for serotonin, 3,380 nM for dopamine, and >10,000 nM for norepinephrine in rat brain synaptosomes.

Tryptamines without substitutions at the amine or alpha carbon, such as tryptamine, serotonin (5-hydroxytryptamine; 5-HT), and 5-methoxytryptamine (5-MeO-T), are known to be very rapidly metabolized and thereby inactivated by monoamine oxidase A (MAO-A) in vivo and to have very short elimination half-lives. However, given intravenously at sufficiently high doses, tryptamine is still known to be able to produce weak and short-lived psychoactive effects in humans.

The chemical synthesis of 7-methyltryptamine has been described. The chemical identification of 7-methyltryptamine has been described as well.

7-Methyltryptamine was first described in the scientific literature by 1956. Its pharmacology was subsequently assessed in greater detail in 2014.

== See also ==
- Substituted tryptamine
- 7-Methyl-DMT
- 7-Methyl-5-MeO-DMT
- 7-Methylpsilocin
- 7-Methoxytryptamine
