= 5-Chloro-αET =

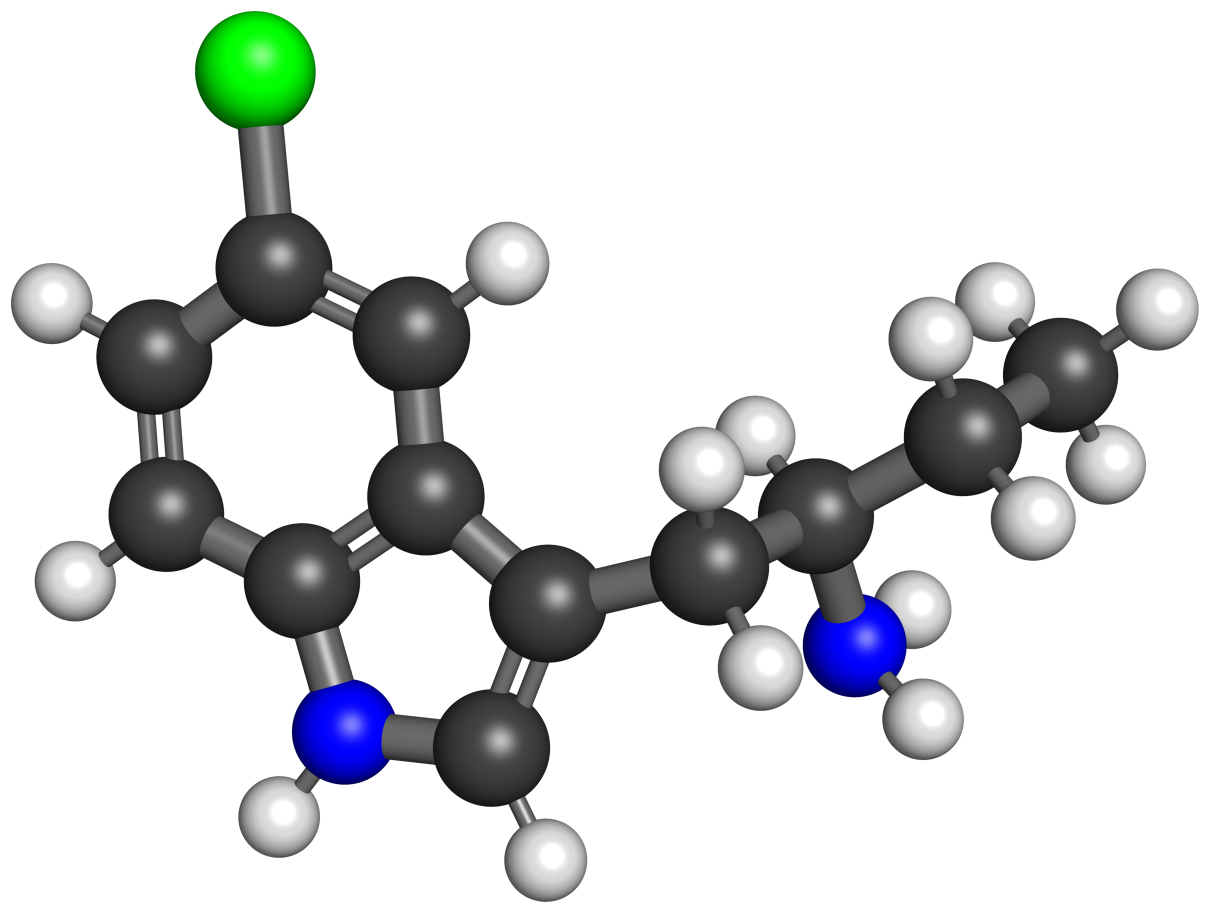

Clinical data
- Other names: 5-Chloro-AET; 5-Chloro-α-ethyltryptamine; PAL-526; PAL526
- Drug class: Serotonin releasing agent; Serotonin 5-HT_{2A} receptor agonist

Identifiers
- IUPAC name: 1-(5-chloro-1H-indol-3-yl)butan-2-amine
- PubChem CID: 112485369
- ChemSpider: 26493372
- ChEMBL: ChEMBL3330647

Chemical and physical data
- Formula: C_{12}H_{15}ClN_{2}
- Molar mass: 222.72 g·mol^{−1}
- 3D model (JSmol): Interactive image
- SMILES: CCC(CC1=CNC2=C1C=C(C=C2)Cl)N
- InChI: InChI=1S/C12H15ClN2/c1-2-10(14)5-8-7-15-12-4-3-9(13)6-11(8)12/h3-4,6-7,10,15H,2,5,14H2,1H3; Key:LBURKXNSAFJELW-UHFFFAOYSA-N

5-Chloro-αET (code name PAL-526), or 5-chloro-AET, also known as 5-chloro-α-ethyltryptamine, is a serotonergic agent of the tryptamine and α-alkyltryptamine families. It is the derivative of α-ethyltryptamine (αET or AET) with a 5-chloro substitution.

== Pharmacology ==
=== Pharmacodynamics ===
The drug is known to act as a potent serotonin releasing agent (SRA) and relatively weak serotonin 5-HT_{2A} receptor near-full agonist. It shows negligible induction of norepinephrine and dopamine release but does act as a very weak dopamine reuptake inhibitor (DRI). 5-Chloro-αET's EC_{50} and IC_{50} values are 33.2 nM for serotonin release, 249 nM (E_{max} = 87%) for serotonin 5-HT_{2A} receptor agonism (7.5-fold lower than for serotonin release), 1,838 nM for dopamine reuptake inhibition (55-fold lower than for serotonin release), and >10,000 nM for norepinephrine release. The monoamine release assays were performed in rat brain synaptosomes.

Several close analogues of 5-chloro-αET, including 5-chloro-αMT and 5-fluoro-αMT, are known to be potent monoamine oxidase inhibitors (MAOIs), specifically of monoamine oxidase A (MAO-A).

== Chemistry ==
=== Analogues ===
Analogues of 5-chloro-αET include α-ethyltryptamine (AET), 5-fluoro-αET, 5-chloro-αMT, and 5-fluoro-αMT, among others.

== History ==
5-Chloro-AET was first described in the scientific literature by at least 1963.

== Society and culture ==
=== Legal status ===
==== Canada ====
5-Chloro-AET is not an explicitly nor implicitly controlled substance in Canada as of 2025.

==== United States ====
5-Chloro-AET is not an explicitly controlled substance in the United States. However, it could be considered a controlled substance under the Federal Analogue Act if intended for human consumption.

== See also ==
- Substituted α-alkyltryptamine
