= 2-Methyl-DMT =

Chemical compound

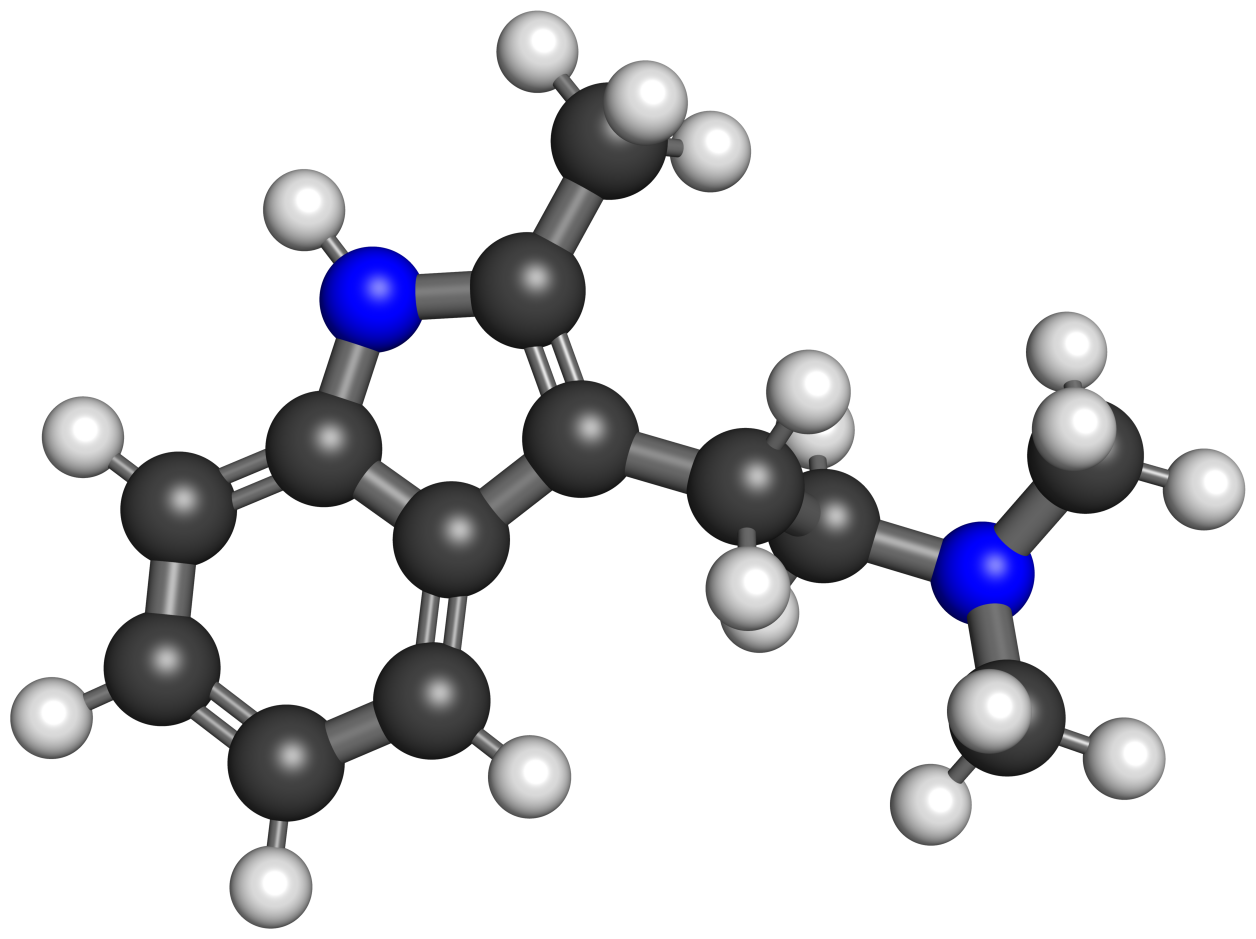

Clinical data
- Other names: 2-Me-DMT; 2-Methyl-N,N-dimethyltryptamine; 2,N,N-Trimethyltryptamine; 2,N,N-TMT; 2-TMT; Desmethoxy-Indapex; 3-[2-(Dimethylamino)ethyl]-2-methylindole;
- Routes of administration: Oral
- ATC code: None

Legal status
- Legal status: DE: NpSG (Industrial and scientific use only); UK: Class A

Pharmacokinetic data
- Duration of action: 4–6 hours

Identifiers
- IUPAC name: (2-(2-methyl-1H-indol-3-yl)-1-methyl-ethyl)dimethylamine
- CAS Number: 1080-95-1
- PubChem CID: 11820174
- ChemSpider: 9994827
- UNII: P15UO6J3FK
- ChEMBL: ChEMBL7580
- CompTox Dashboard (EPA): DTXSID801016967

Chemical and physical data
- Formula: C_{13}H_{18}N_{2}
- Molar mass: 202.301 g·mol^{−1}
- 3D model (JSmol): Interactive image
- SMILES: Cc1c(c2ccccc2[nH]1)CCN(C)C
- InChI: InChI=1S/C13H18N2/c1-10-11(8-9-15(2)3)12-6-4-5-7-13(12)14-10/h4-7,14H,8-9H2,1-3H3; Key:NDGCOWDSLVNLGE-UHFFFAOYSA-N

2-Methyl-DMT, or 2-Me-DMT, also known as 2-methyl-N,N-dimethyltryptamine or as 2,N,N-trimethyltryptamine (2,N,N-TMT or 2-TMT), is a psychoactive drug of the tryptamine family related to the psychedelic drug dimethyltryptamine (DMT). It is not a conventional psychedelic, but instead produces tactile enhancement and auditory distortion. The drug was described by Alexander Shulgin and reported in his book TiHKAL (Tryptamines I Have Known and Loved).

== Use and effects ==
2-Methyl-DMT is claimed to show psychoactive effects at a dose of 50 to 100 mg orally, but these are relatively mild compared to other similar drugs. This suggests that while the 2-methyl group has blocked the binding of metabolic enzymes, it is also interfering with binding to the 5-HT_{2A} receptor target that mediates the hallucinogenic effects of these drugs. The duration of 2-methyl-DMT is 4 to 6 hours.

The specific effects produced by 2-methyl-DMT included tingling, mild stomach rumbling, mild relaxation, skin "alerting" especially on the head and neck, bodily/tactile activation and heightened sensitivity, auditory distortion, and altered tonal perception. There were no visuals, no cloudiness of thought processes, no motor impairment, but sexual activity was said to be enhanced. There were no changes in appetite, no gastrointestinal problems, and no after-effects the next day. The drug was described as not being a psychedelic or psychostimulant, but instead being a specific "tactile stimulant" and sexual enhancer.

== Pharmacology ==
=== Pharmacodynamics ===
Its affinities (K_{i}) for the serotonin 5-HT_{1A} and 5-HT_{2A} receptor were 4,598 nM and 15,037 nM, respectively. These affinities were dramatically lower than those of dimethyltryptamine (DMT) in the same study, which were 87 nM and 1,513 nM, respectively. Hence, 2-methyl-DMT appears to show approximately 53- and 10-fold lower affinities for the serotonin 5-HT_{1A} and 5-HT_{2A} receptors compared to DMT. In addition, unlike DMT, 2-methyl-DMT failed to activate the serotonin 5-HT_{1A} and 5-HT_{2A} receptors. Similarly, 2-methyl-DMT showed profoundly reduced serotonin receptor agonism in the rat uterus and fundus strip. Despite the preceding findings however, 2-methyl-DMT robustly induces the head-twitch response, a behavioral proxy of psychedelic effects, in rodents, and does so to a similar magnitude as psilocin and 5-MeO-DMT.

In studies of other 2-methyltryptamines, specifically 2-methyl-5-MeO-DALT and 2-methyl-5-F-DALT, these compounds had variably reduced affinities for serotonin receptors and, in contrast to 2-methyl-DMT, did not produce the head-twitch response.

== Chemistry ==
=== Synthesis ===
The chemical synthesis of 2-methyl-DMT has been described.

=== Analogues ===
Analogues of 2-methyl-DMT include dimethyltryptamine (DMT), 2-methyltryptamine (2-methyl-T), 2-methyl-DET, 2-methyl-AMT, 2-Me-5-MeO-DMT (5-MeO-2,N,N-TMT), 4-methyl-DMT, 5-methyl-DMT, 6-methyl-DMT, and 7-methyl-DMT.

== History ==
2-Methyl-DMT was first described in the scientific literature by R. B. Barlow and I. Khan by 1959. Subsequently, it was described in greater detail by Alexander Shulgin in his book TiHKAL (Tryptamines I Have Known and Loved) in 1997.

== Society and culture ==
=== Legal status ===
==== Canada ====
2-Methyl-DMT is not an explicitly nor implicitly controlled substance in Canada as of 2025.

==== Sweden ====
Sweden's public health agency suggested classifying 2-methyl-DMT as a hazardous substance, on May 15, 2019.

==== United States ====
2-Methyl-DMT is not an explicitly controlled substance in the United States. However, it could be considered a controlled substance under the Federal Analogue Act if intended for human consumption.

== See also ==
- Substituted tryptamine
