= 4-MeO-DET =

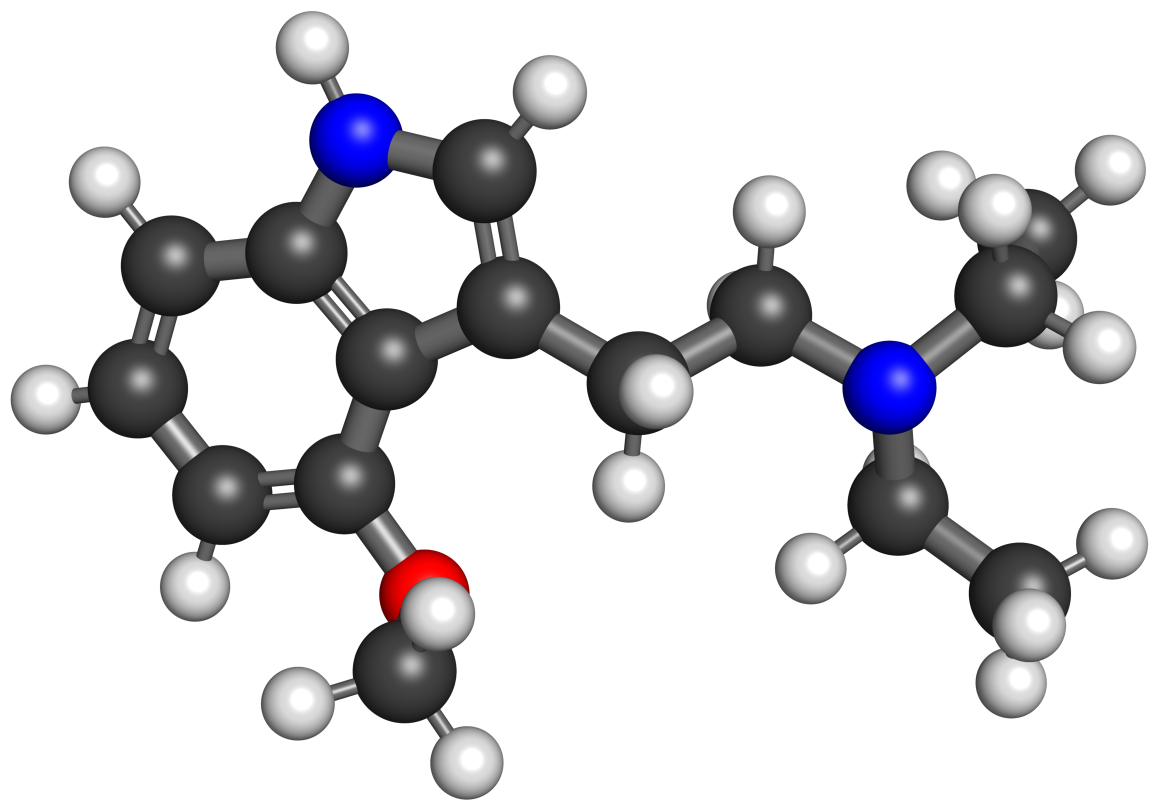

Clinical data
- Other names: 4-OMe-DET; 4-Methoxy-N,N-diethyltryptamine; 4-Methoxy-DET
- Routes of administration: Oral, smoking
- ATC code: None

Pharmacokinetic data
- Onset of action: Unknown
- Duration of action: Unknown

Identifiers
- IUPAC name: N,N-diethyl-2-(4-methoxy-1H-indol-3-yl)ethanamine
- PubChem CID: 24802084
- ChemSpider: 21436170

Chemical and physical data
- Formula: C_{15}H_{22}N_{2}O
- Molar mass: 246.354 g·mol^{−1}
- 3D model (JSmol): Interactive image
- SMILES: CCN(CC)CCC1=CNC2=C1C(=CC=C2)OC
- InChI: InChI=1S/C15H22N2O/c1-4-17(5-2)10-9-12-11-16-13-7-6-8-14(18-3)15(12)13/h6-8,11,16H,4-5,9-10H2,1-3H3; Key:HIVMOHVUFLVCMM-UHFFFAOYSA-N

4-MeO-DET, also known as 4-methoxy-N,N-diethyltryptamine, is a chemical compound of the tryptamine and 4-methoxytryptamine families related to psilocin (4-HO-DMT). It is the 4-methoxy derivative of diethyltryptamine (DET), the O-methyl ether 4-HO-DET (ethocin), and a positional isomer of 5-MeO-DET.

== Use and effects ==
According to Alexander Shulgin in his 1997 book TiHKAL (Tryptamines I Have Known and Loved), 4-MeO-DET is completely inactive at doses of up to 30 mg orally or smoked. Hence, its dose range is unknown but greater than 30 mg and its duration is unknown. Higher doses were not assessed.

== Chemistry ==
=== Analogues ===
Analogues of 4-MeO-DET include diethyltryptamine (DET), 4-methoxytryptamine (4-MT or 4-MeO-T), 4-HO-DET (ethocin), 4-AcO-DET (ethacetin), 5-MeO-DET, 4-MeO-DMT, 4-MeO-DiPT, 4-MeO-MiPT, and 4-methyl-DMT, among others. 4-MeO-MiPT is known to be active, producing erotic-enhancing effects but little in the way of visuals, whereas 4-MeO-DMT and 4-MeO-DiPT have been found to be active in preclinical research but have not been tested in humans.

== History ==
Aside from 4-MeO-DET's description in Alexander Shulgin's 1997 book TiHKAL (Tryptamines I Have Known and Loved), 4-MeO-DET does not appear to have been otherwise described in the literature.

== See also ==
- Substituted tryptamine
