= C15H22N2O =

The molecular formula C_{15}H_{22}N_{2}O (molar mass : 246.35 g/mol) may refer to:

- Eserethole
- 2-Ethyl-5-methoxy-N,N-dimethyltryptamine
- 4-HO-EPT
- 4-HO-EiPT
- 4-HO-MBT
- Levomilnacipran
- 4-MeO-DET
- 4-MeO-MiPT, a psychedelic drug
- 5-MeO-DET
- 5-MeO-MPT
- 5-MeO-MiPT
- 5-MeO-NsBT
- Mepivacaine
- Milnacipran
- Piquindone
- 1-Propyl-5-MeO-AMT
- F-17475
