= C17H24N2O2 =

The molecular formula C_{17}H_{24}N_{2}O_{2} (molar mass : 288.39 g/mol) may refer to:

- NBoc-DMT
- 4-AcO-EPT
- 4-AcO-EiPT
- 4,5-MDO-DiPT
- 5,6-MDO-DiPT
- Phenglutarimide
- O-Pivalylbufotenine
