= C13H18N2S =

The molecular formula C_{13}H_{18}N_{2}S (molar mass: 234.36 g/mol) may refer to:

- 4-MeS-DMT
- 5-MeS-DMT
