= 2-Methyl-DiPT =

Clinical data
- Other names: 2-Me-DiPT; 2-Methyl-N,N-diisopropyltryptamine
- Routes of administration: Unknown
- Drug class: Unknown
- ATC code: None

Pharmacokinetic data
- Duration of action: Unknown

Identifiers
- IUPAC name: N-[2-(2-methyl-1H-indol-3-yl)ethyl]-N-propan-2-ylpropan-2-amine

Chemical and physical data
- Formula: C_{17}H_{26}N_{2}
- Molar mass: 258.409 g·mol^{−1}
- 3D model (JSmol): Interactive image
- SMILES: CC(N(C(C)C)CCC(C1=CC=CC=C1N2)=C2C)C
- InChI: InChI=1S/C17H26N2/c1-12(2)19(13(3)4)11-10-15-14(5)18-17-9-7-6-8-16(15)17/h6-9,12-13,18H,10-11H2,1-5H3; Key:VRRKLUAGPLTKAR-UHFFFAOYSA-N

2-Methyl-DiPT, or 2-Me-DiPT, also known as 2-methyl-N,N-diisopropyltryptamine, is a chemical compound of the tryptamine family related to the psychedelic drug diisopropyltryptamine (DiPT). It is the 2-methyl derivative of DiPT.

The drug was mentioned by Alexander Shulgin in his book TiHKAL (Tryptamines I Have Known and Loved) as a potentially interesting analogue of DiPT that might likewise produce selective auditory hallucinogenic effects. This was based on findings that other 2-methylated tryptamines like 2-methyl-DMT and 2-methyl-DET have also uniquely been found to produce DiPT-like auditory effects. However, 2-methyl-DiPT is not known to have been synthesized nor tested.

A notable derivative of 2-methyl-DiPT is 5-MeO-2-Me-DiPT. In addition, a notable analogue of 2-methyl-DiPT is 2-methyl-iPALT.

2-Methyl-DiPT was first described by Shulgin in TiHKAL in 1997.

== See also ==
- Substituted tryptamine
