= C17H24N2 =

The molecular formula C_{17}H_{24}N_{2} (molar mass: 256.393 g/mol) may refer to:

- RU-28251
- 2-Methyl-iPALT
