= 4,5-MDO-DMT =

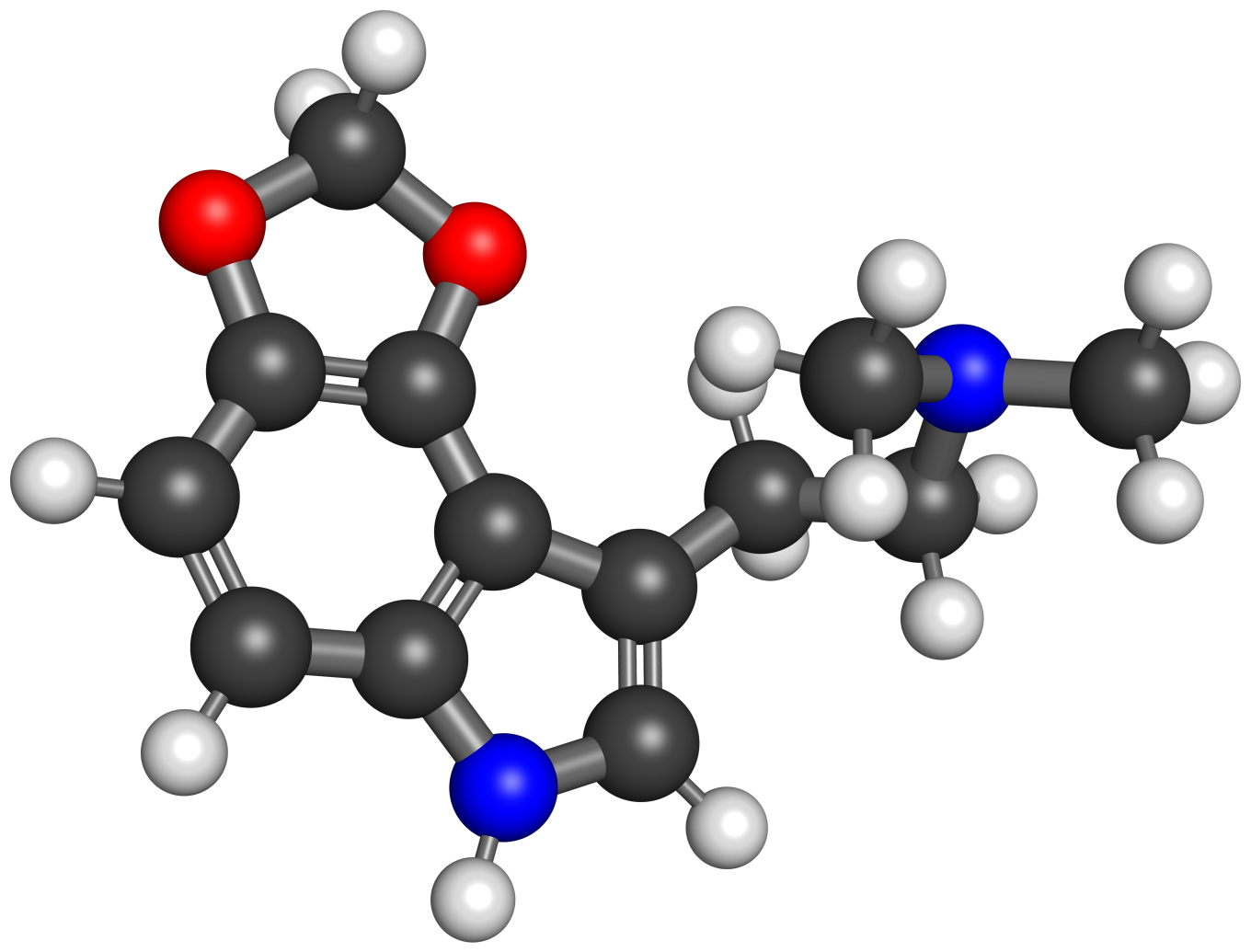

Clinical data
- Other names: 4,5-Methylenedioxy-N,N-dimethyltryptamine
- ATC code: None

Pharmacokinetic data
- Onset of action: Unknown
- Duration of action: Unknown

Identifiers
- IUPAC name: 2-(2H,6H-[1,3]dioxolo[4,5-e]indol-8-yl)-N,N-dimethylethan-1-amine
- CAS Number: 81249-30-1
- PubChem CID: 44278540
- ChemSpider: 23126498
- UNII: L83E2J7P8Z
- ChEMBL: ChEMBL28354
- CompTox Dashboard (EPA): DTXSID201027182

Chemical and physical data
- Formula: C_{13}H_{16}N_{2}O_{2}
- Molar mass: 232.283 g·mol^{−1}
- 3D model (JSmol): Interactive image
- Melting point: 93 to 95 °C (199 to 203 °F)
- SMILES: CN(C)CCC1=CNC2=C1C(OCO3)=C3C=C2
- InChI: InChI=1S/C13H16N2O2/c1-15(2)6-5-9-7-14-10-3-4-11-13(12(9)10)17-8-16-11/h3-4,7,14H,5-6,8H2,1-2H3; Key:ZMKRWFZFMOKVCP-UHFFFAOYSA-N

4,5-MDO-DMT, or 4,5-methylenedioxy-N,N-dimethyltryptamine, is a lesser-known psychedelic drug of the tryptamine family. It is the 4,5-methylenedioxy derivative of dimethyltryptamine (DMT) and is an analogue of psilocin (4-HO-DMT) and 5-MeO-DMT. The drug was included as an entry in Alexander Shulgin's 1997 book TiHKAL (Tryptamines I Have Known and Loved), but it was not tested to determine its psychoactive effects and its dose and duration are unknown. Studies in rodents found that its potential hallucinogenic potency is less than that of 4,5-MDO-DiPT but greater than that of 5,6-MDO-DiPT. Its chemical synthesis has been described. 4,5-MDO-DMT was first described in the scientific literature by Toni B. Kline and colleagues in 1982.

== See also ==
- Substituted tryptamine
