= 4-MeS-DMT =

Clinical data
- Other names: 4-SMe-DMT; 4-Methylthio-N,N-dimethyltryptamine
- Drug class: Serotonin receptor modulator; Serotonergic psychedelic; Hallucinogen
- ATC code: None

Identifiers
- IUPAC name: N,N-dimethyl-2-(4-methylsulfanyl-1H-indol-3-yl)ethanamine
- CAS Number: 10455-77-3
- PubChem CID: 193459
- ChemSpider: 167880
- ChEMBL: ChEMBL285355

Chemical and physical data
- Formula: C_{13}H_{18}N_{2}S
- Molar mass: 234.36 g·mol^{−1}
- 3D model (JSmol): Interactive image
- SMILES: CN(C)CCC1=CNC2=C1C(=CC=C2)SC
- InChI: InChI=1S/C13H18N2S/c1-15(2)8-7-10-9-14-11-5-4-6-12(16-3)13(10)11/h4-6,9,14H,7-8H2,1-3H3; Key:YWCOPJQNWPEWQP-UHFFFAOYSA-N

4-MeS-DMT, or 4-SMe-DMT, also known as 4-methylthio-N,N-dimethyltryptamine, is a serotonin receptor modulator and possible psychedelic drug of the tryptamine family related to psilocin. It is the 4-methylthio derivative of psilocin (4-HO-DMT) and is an analogue of 4-MeO-DMT. The drug's properties and effects in humans are unknown. It shows affinity for serotonin receptors. 4-MeS-DMT produces psychedelic-like behavioral effects in animals, for instance generalization with 5-MeO-DMT in rodent drug discrimination tests, though is less potent than 5-MeS-DMT or 4-MeO-DMT. The chemical synthesis of 4-MeS-DMT has been described. 4-MeS-DMT was first described in the scientific literature by Richard Glennon and colleagues in 1982. Subsequently, it was briefly described by Alexander Shulgin in his book TiHKAL (Tryptamines I Have Known and Loved) in 1997.

== See also ==
- Substituted tryptamine
