= 2-HO-NMT =

Chemical compound

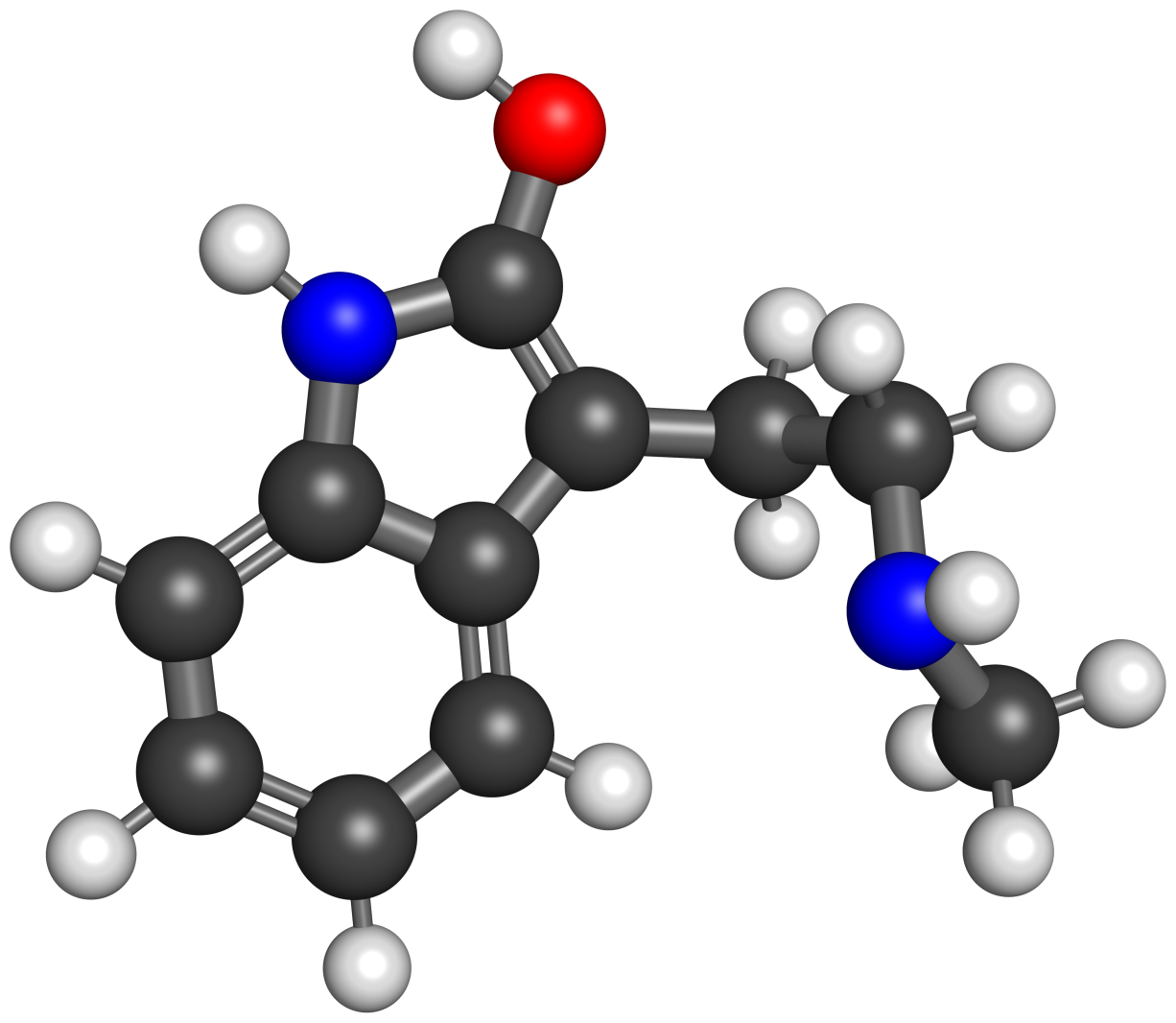

Identifiers
- IUPAC name: 3-[2-(methylamino)ethyl]-1H-indol-2-ol
- CAS Number: 106987-89-7
- PubChem CID: 101412996
- ChemSpider: 62893050
- UNII: EJK5GG95D9

Chemical and physical data
- Formula: C_{11}H_{14}N_{2}O
- Molar mass: 190.246 g·mol^{−1}
- 3D model (JSmol): Interactive image
- SMILES: CNCCC1=C(NC2=CC=CC=C21)O
- InChI: InChI=1S/C11H14N2O/c1-12-7-6-9-8-4-2-3-5-10(8)13-11(9)14/h2-5,12-14H,6-7H2,1H3; Key:XZRSXHHQVNZNTA-UHFFFAOYSA-N

2-Hydroxy-N-methyltryptamine (2-HO-NMT) is a tryptamine and is the 2-hydroxy analog of N-methyltryptamine (NMT). It is briefly mentioned in Alexander Shulgin's book TiHKAL (Tryptamines I Have Known and Loved) under the DMT entry and is stated to be found in Desmanthus illinoensis.

== See also ==
- 2-Methyltryptamine
- NMT
- DMT
