= C17H26N2O =

The molecular formula C_{17}H_{26}N_{2}O (molar mass: 274.40 g/mol) may refer to:

- 4-MeO-DiPT
- 5-MeO-PiPT
- 5-MeO-DPT, a hallucinogenic drug
- 5-Methoxy-diisopropyltryptamine
- Phenampromide
- Ropivacaine
