= 2-Methyltryptamine =

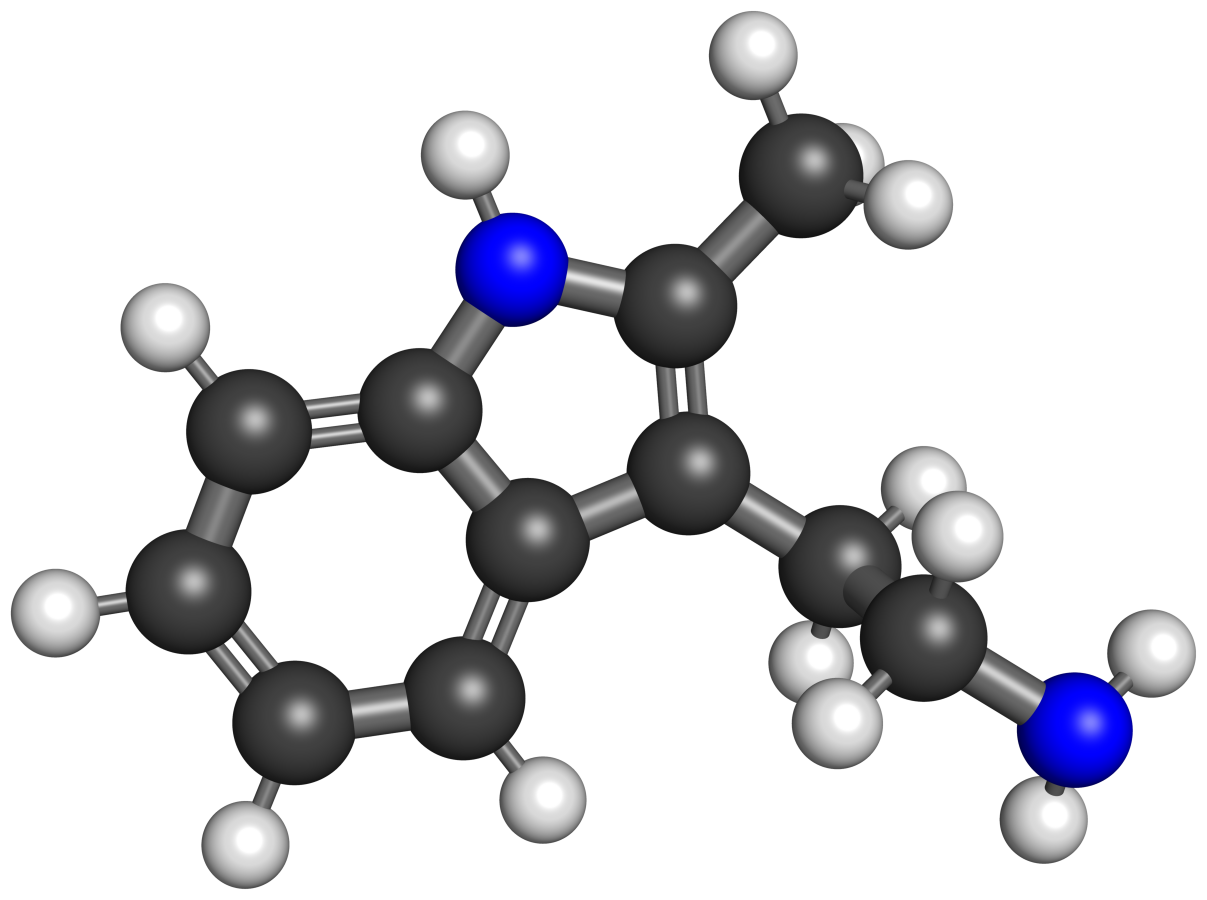

Clinical data
- Other names: 2-MT; 2-Me-T; 2-Methyl-T
- Drug class: Serotonin receptor agonist
- ATC code: None

Identifiers
- IUPAC name: 2-(2-methyl-1H-indol-3-yl)ethanamine
- CAS Number: 2731-06-8
- PubChem CID: 75949
- ChemSpider: 68452
- ChEMBL: ChEMBL2358910
- CompTox Dashboard (EPA): DTXSID30181755
- ECHA InfoCard: 100.018.498

Chemical and physical data
- Formula: C_{11}H_{14}N_{2}
- Molar mass: 174.247 g·mol^{−1}
- 3D model (JSmol): Interactive image
- SMILES: CC1=C(C2=CC=CC=C2N1)CCN
- InChI: InChI=1S/C11H14N2/c1-8-9(6-7-12)10-4-2-3-5-11(10)13-8/h2-5,13H,6-7,12H2,1H3; Key:CPVSLHQIPGTMLH-UHFFFAOYSA-N

2-Methyltryptamine (2-MT, 2-Me-T, or 2-methyl-T) is a serotonin receptor agonist of the tryptamine family. It shows dramatically reduced activity at serotonin receptors compared to tryptamine and mixed effects in terms of psychedelic-like effects in animals.

== Pharmacology ==
=== Pharmacodynamics ===
2-MT shows affinity (K_{i}) for the serotonin 5-HT_{1A} and 5-HT_{2A} receptors, with K_{i} values of 1,095 nM and 7,774 nM, respectively. These affinities were respectively 34-fold and 3.2-fold lower than those of tryptamine in the same study. It also acts as an agonist of the serotonin 5-HT_{1A} and 5-HT_{2A} receptors, with EC_{50} values of 12,534 nM and 4,598 nM, respectively. These activational potencies were respectively 14-fold and 19-fold lower than those of tryptamine in the same study.

It does not produce conditioned place preference (CPP), self-administration, or changes in locomotor activity in rodents. Findings on whether 2-MT produces the head-twitch response (HTR), a behavioral proxy of psychedelic effects, are mixed. In one study, it produced the HTR at a dose of 3 mg/kg intraperitoneally, and this was completely blocked by the serotonin 5-HT_{2A} receptor antagonist ketanserin. In another study, both tryptamine and 2-MT did not produce the HTR at a dose of 3 mg/kg intraperitoneally.

== Chemistry ==
=== Derivatives ===
A number of derivatives of 2-MT are known, including:

- 2,α-Dimethyltryptamine (2,α-DMT or 2-Me-αMT)
- 2,N,N-Trimethyltryptamine (2,N,N-TMT or 2-Me-DMT)
- 2-Methyl-N,N-diethyltryptamine (2-Me-DET)
- 5-Methoxy-2,N,N-trimethyltryptamine (5-MeO-2,N,N-TMT or 2-Me-5-MeO-DMT)

These drugs were synthesized and tested by Alexander Shulgin. He found that the drugs in this group became orally active but generally produced no or only mild psychedelic effects (with the exception of 2-Me-5-MeO-DMT). Instead, they caused effects like tactile enhancement and auditory distortion, among others.

A few other derivatives, including 2-methyl-DiPT, 2-methyl-iPALT, 2-methyl-5-MeO-DALT, and 2-methyl-5-F-DALT, are also known.

Further derivatives of 2-MT include the following:

- 2-Methyl-5-HT (a moderately selective serotonin 5-HT_{3} receptor full agonist)
- 2-Methyl-5-chloro-DMT (ST-1936; a selective serotonin 5-HT_{6} receptor agonist)
- 2-Ethyl-5-methoxy-DMT (EMDT; a selective serotonin 5-HT_{6} receptor agonist)

EMD-386088 (2-methyl-5-chloro-3-(1,2,3,6-tetrahydropyridin-4-yl)-1H-indole) isn't technically a tryptamine but is very similar and is a serotonin 5-HT_{6} receptor partial agonist as well as having moderate affinity for the serotonin 5-HT_{3} receptor and acting as a dopamine reuptake inhibitor.

Yet another related compound is 2-HO-NMT, a tryptamine alkaloid.

== See also ==
- Substituted tryptamine
- 1-Methyltryptamine
- 5-Methyltryptamine
