= 5-MeO-2-TMT =

Chemical compound

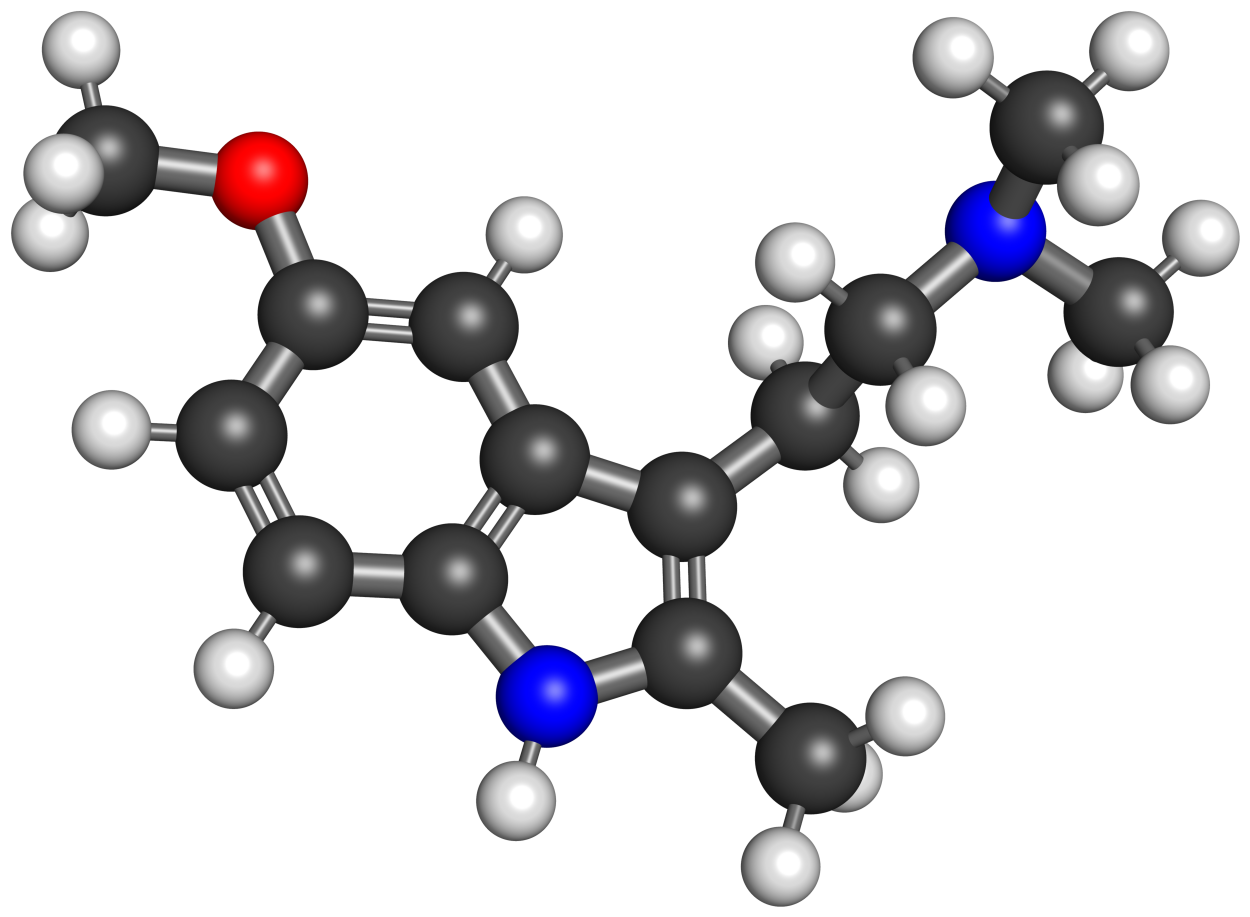

Clinical data
- Other names: 5-Methoxy-2,N,N-trimethyltryptamine; 5-MeO-2,N,N-TMT; 5-MeO-TMT; 2-Methyl-5-methoxy-N,N-dimethyltryptamine; 2-Me-5-MeO-DMT; Indapex; MMDT; 5-Methoxy-2-methyl-DMT
- Routes of administration: Oral
- Drug class: Serotonin receptor modulator; Serotonergic psychedelic; Hallucinogen
- ATC code: None

Legal status
- Legal status: DE: NpSG (Industrial and scientific use only); UK: Class A

Pharmacokinetic data
- Duration of action: 5–10 hours

Identifiers
- IUPAC name: 2-(5-methoxy-2-methyl-1H-indol-3-yl)-N,N-dimethylethanamine
- CAS Number: 67292-68-6
- PubChem CID: 49756
- ChemSpider: 45143
- UNII: XZ2CCP18I2
- ChEMBL: ChEMBL7143
- CompTox Dashboard (EPA): DTXSID10217627

Chemical and physical data
- Formula: C_{14}H_{20}N_{2}O
- Molar mass: 232.327 g·mol^{−1}
- 3D model (JSmol): Interactive image
- SMILES: CC1=C(C2=C(N1)C=CC(=C2)OC)CCN(C)C
- InChI: InChI=1S/C14H20N2O/c1-10-12(7-8-16(2)3)13-9-11(17-4)5-6-14(13)15-10/h5-6,9,15H,7-8H2,1-4H3; Key:ACEHBQPPDDGCGZ-UHFFFAOYSA-N

5-Methoxy-2,N,N-trimethyltryptamine (5-MeO-2,N,N-TMT, 5-MeO-TMT), also known as 2-methyl-5-methoxy-N,N-dimethyltryptamine (2-Me-5-MeO-DMT), is a serotonin receptor modulator and psychedelic drug of the tryptamine and 2-alkyltryptamine families. It is taken orally.

5-MeO-2-TMT was first synthesized by Alexander Shulgin and reported in his 1997 book TiHKAL (Tryptamines I Have Known and Loved).

== Use and effects ==
According to Alexander Shulgin in his book TiHKAL (Tryptamines I Have Known and Loved), 5-MeO-TMT has a dose range of 75 to 150 mg orally and a duration of 5 to 10 hours. It produces effects including sexual stimulation, enhanced orgasm, relaxation, sedation, tingling, sleep disturbances, chills and cold sensations, time dilation, reduced heart rate, reduced respiratory rate, mild nausea, motor incoordination, visual waviness, mild to pronounced closed-eye visuals, emotional lability, crying, body temperature fluctuations, uncomfortableness, gastrointestinal disturbances, and abdominal pain. It has been said that 5-MeO-TMT at a dose of 150 mg is definitely hallucinogenic and can be compared to a moderate 300 mg dose of mescaline.

== Pharmacology ==
=== Pharmacodynamics ===
5-MeO-2-TMT activities
Target	K_{i} (nM)
5-HT_{1A}	200
5-HT_{1B}	>10,000
5-HT_{1D}	250
5-HT_{1E}	1,800
5-HT_{1F}	ND
5-HT_{2A}	>10,000 (rat)
5-HT_{2B}	ND
5-HT_{2C}	4,020 (rat)
5-HT_{3}	ND
5-HT_{4}	ND
5-HT_{5A}	10,450
5-HT_{6}	60–80
5-HT_{7}	145
α_{1A}–α_{2C}	ND
β_{1}–β_{3}	ND
D_{1}–D_{5}	>10,000
H_{1}	>10,000
H_{2}	ND
H_{3}, H_{4}	>10,000
M_{1}–M_{5}	>10,000
I_{1}	ND
σ_{1}, σ_{2}	ND
TAAR1	ND
SERT	>10,000
NET	6,380
DAT	>10,000
Notes: The smaller the value, the more avidly the drug binds to the site. All proteins are human unless otherwise specified. Refs:

The affinities of 5-MeO-TMT for numerous targets have been reported. 2-Methyltryptamines like 5-MeO-TMT show a loss of affinity for the serotonin 5-HT_{2A} receptor but retained affinity for the serotonin 5-HT_{6} receptor. It also retains significant affinity for the serotonin 5-HT_{1A}, 5-HT_{1D}, and 5-HT_{7} receptors. In contrast to 5-MeO-DMT, 5-MeO-TMT is orally active, suggesting that the 2-methyl group blocks metabolism by monoamine oxidase (MAO).

== Chemistry ==
=== Synthesis ===
The chemical synthesis of 5-MeO-2-TMT has been described.

=== Analogues ===
- 2-Methyltryptamine (2-MT or 2-Me-T)
- 2-Methyl-N,N-diethyltryptamine (2-Me-DET)
- 2,N,N-Trimethyltryptamine (2,N,N-TMT or 2-Me-DMT)
- 2,α-Dimethyltryptamine (2,α-DMT or 2-Me-αMT)
- 5-Methoxy-7,N,N-trimethyltryptamine (5-MeO-7-TMT or 7-Me-5-MeO-DMT)
- 2-Ethyl-5-methoxy-N,N-dimethyltryptamine (EMDT; 2-Et-5-MeO-DMT)
- BGC20-761 (5-MeO-2-phenyl-DMT)

== Society and culture ==
=== Legal status ===
==== Canada ====
5-MeO-2-TMT is not an explicitly nor implicitly controlled substance in Canada as of 2025.

==== United States ====
5-MeO-2-TMT is not an explicitly controlled substance in the United States. However, it could be considered a controlled substance under the Federal Analogue Act if intended for human consumption.

== See also ==
- Substituted tryptamine
