= 2-(Indol-3-yl)cyclopropylamines =

Class of chemical compounds

2-(Indol-3-yl)cyclopropylamines, or cyclopropa-tryptamines, among other names, are a class serotonergic drugs of chemical compounds of the indole family, with a structure related to tryptamines.

2-(Indol-3-yl)cyclopropylamines can be conceptualized as cyclized analogs of certain substituted tryptamines, such as N,N-dimethyltryptamine, or tryptamines substituted with methoxy or other functional groups, for instance, 4- or 5-methoxy-N,N-dimethyltryptamine (4-MeO-DMT and 5-MeO-DMT). Prior to the discovery of 2-(indol-3-yl)cyclopropylamines and related compounds, the conformational changes that occur when a tryptamine molecule interacts with a receptor were not fully understood. To investigate this, the flexible ethylamine chain of tryptamine is replaced with a rigid cyclopropane ring, which defines the chemical structure of this class.

== Pharmacology ==
=== Pharmacodynamics ===
Binding (Ki) of a cyclopropa-T-type compound to 5-HT receptors
Compound	5-HT1A	5-HT2A	5-HT2B	5-HT2C
Racemic cyclopropa-T			Unknown	
		Unknown	Unknown	
			Unknown	
		Unknown	Unknown	
