= BGC20-761 =

Identifiers
- IUPAC name: 2-(5-methoxy-2-phenyl-1H-indol-3-yl)-N,N-dimethylethanamine
- CAS Number: 17375-63-2
- PubChem CID: 6918515
- ChemSpider: 5293712
- UNII: 6G5F6ESV5I
- ChEMBL: ChEMBL7318

Chemical and physical data
- Formula: C_{19}H_{22}N_{2}O
- Molar mass: 294.398 g·mol^{−1}
- 3D model (JSmol): Interactive image
- SMILES: CN(C)CCC1=C(NC2=C1C=C(C=C2)OC)C3=CC=CC=C3
- InChI: InChI=1S/C19H22N2O/c1-21(2)12-11-16-17-13-15(22-3)9-10-18(17)20-19(16)14-7-5-4-6-8-14/h4-10,13,20H,11-12H2,1-3H3; Key:VSGPGYWZVPDDSK-UHFFFAOYSA-N

BGC20-761 (5-MeO-2-phenyl-DMT, PMDT) is an experimental drug which acts as an antagonist of the 5-HT_{6}, 5-HT_{2} family, and dopamine D2 receptors, with strongest affinity for 5-HT_{6}. In animal studies it has antipsychotic-like effects, but also memory enhancing action attributed to its 5-HT_{6} affinity.

== See also ==
- EMDT
- ST-1936
