= HBL20016 =

Clinical data
- Other names: HBL-20016; 5-Methylthio-6-fluoro-N,N-dimethyltryptamine; 5-MeS-6-F-DMT
- Drug class: Serotonin receptor agonist; Serotonin 5-HT_{1A}, 5-HT_{2A}, 5-HT_{2B}, and 5-HT_{2C} receptor agonist; Serotonergic psychedelic; Hallucinogen; Antiobsessional agent

Identifiers
- IUPAC name: 2-(6-fluoro-5-methylsulfanyl-1H-indol-3-yl)-N,N-dimethylethanamine
- PubChem CID: 177962217

Chemical and physical data
- Formula: C_{13}H_{17}FN_{2}S
- Molar mass: 252.35 g·mol^{−1}
- 3D model (JSmol): Interactive image
- SMILES: CN(C)CCC1=CNC2=CC(=C(C=C21)SC)F
- InChI: InChI=1S/C13H17FN2S/c1-16(2)5-4-9-8-15-12-7-11(14)13(17-3)6-10(9)12/h6-8,15H,4-5H2,1-3H3; Key:KQLJYTPVARKBRE-UHFFFAOYSA-N

HBL20016, also known as 5-methylthio-6-fluoro-N,N-dimethyltryptamine (5-MeS-6-F-DMT), is a non-selective serotonin receptor agonist and serotonergic psychedelic of the tryptamine family related to 5-MeO-DMT. It is the 6-fluoro derivative of 5-MeS-DMT and the 5-methylthio derivative of 6-fluoro-DMT.

The drug acts as an agonist of the serotonin 5-HT_{1A}, 5-HT_{2A}, 5-HT_{2B}, and 5-HT_{2C} receptors. Its activational potencies (EC_{50}) are 645 nM for the serotonin 5-HT_{1A} receptor, 1.64 nM for the serotonin 5-HT_{2A} receptor, 3.42 nM for the serotonin 5-HT_{2B} receptor, and 8.37 nM for the serotonin 5-HT_{2C} receptor. HBL20016 produces the head-twitch response (HTR), a behavioral proxy of psychedelic effects, in rodents, and hence would be expected to be hallucinogenic in humans. The HTR induced by HBL20016 is comparable in magnitude to that occurring with psilocybin. HBL20016 has shown antiobsessional-like effects in rodents, for instance against obsessive self-grooming.

The chemical synthesis of HBL20016 has been described.

HBL20016 was first described in the scientific literature in December 2024. It was developed by Negev Labs and Parow Entheobiosciences. A related drug, HBL20017 (4-F-5-MeS-DMT), which is a non-hallucinogenic agent with an otherwise mostly similar pharmacological profile, is under investigation for the potential treatment of obsessive–compulsive disorder (OCD).

== See also ==
- Substituted tryptamine
- List of investigational hallucinogens and entactogens
- HBL20017 (4-F-5-MeS-DMT)
