= 5-MeS-DMT =

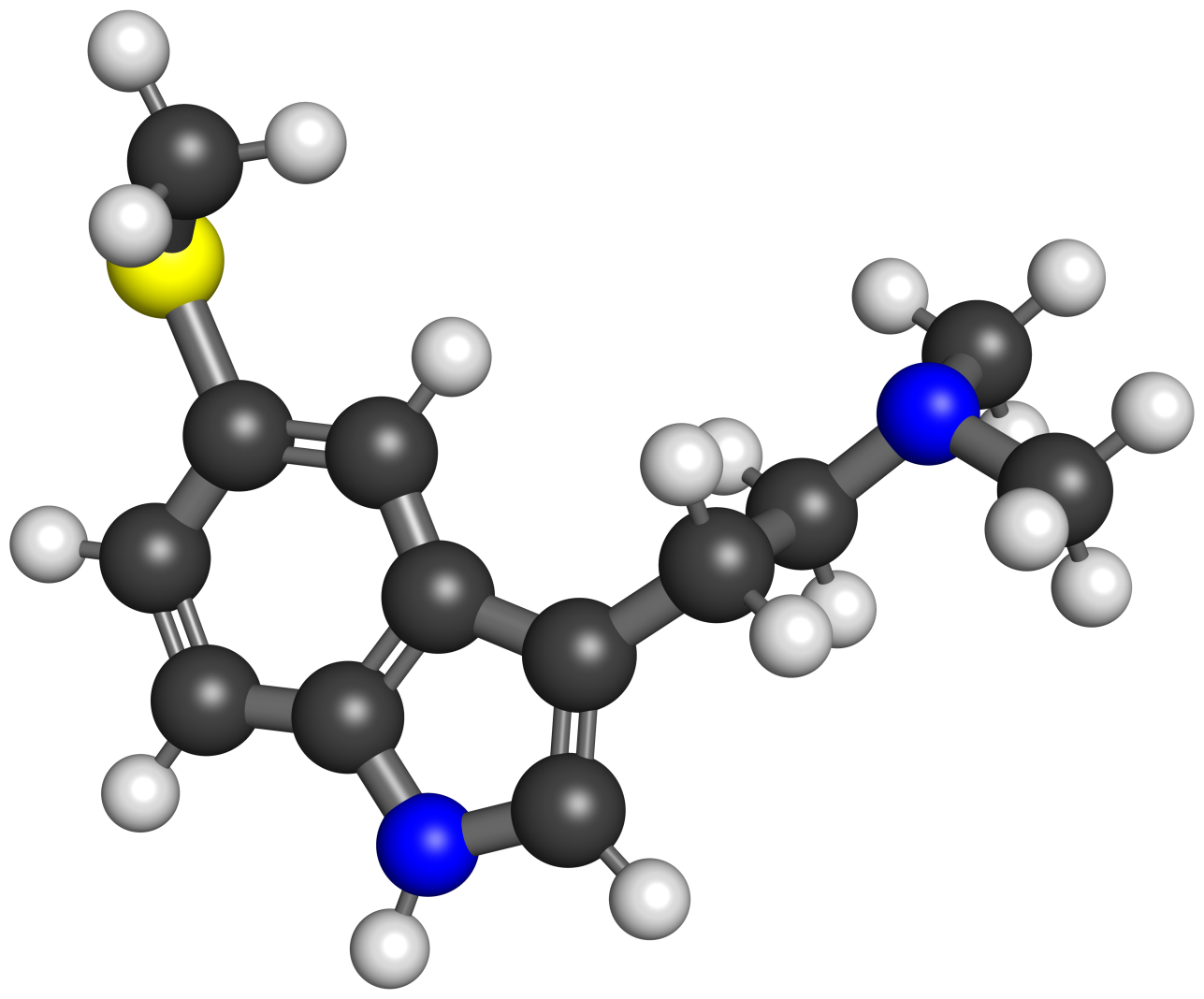

Clinical data
- Other names: 5-Methylthio-N,N-dimethyltryptamine; 5-Methylthio-DMT
- Routes of administration: Smoking
- Drug class: Serotonin receptor modulator; Serotonergic psychedelic; Hallucinogen
- ATC code: None

Pharmacokinetic data
- Onset of action: Very fast
- Duration of action: 10–30 minutes or <1 hour

Identifiers
- IUPAC name: N,N-dimethyl-2-[5-(methylsulfanyl)-1H-indol-3-yl]ethan-1-amine
- CAS Number: 5102-11-4
- PubChem CID: 21180
- ChemSpider: 19917
- UNII: 8E8PJ79K57
- ChEMBL: ChEMBL31783
- CompTox Dashboard (EPA): DTXSID50199019

Chemical and physical data
- Formula: C_{13}H_{18}N_{2}S
- Molar mass: 234.36 g·mol^{−1}
- 3D model (JSmol): Interactive image
- SMILES: CN(CCC1=CNC2=C1C=C(SC)C=C2)C
- InChI: InChI=1S/C13H18N2S/c1-15(2)7-6-10-9-14-13-5-4-11(16-3)8-12(10)13/h4-5,8-9,14H,6-7H2,1-3H3; Key:YOGJZQGRTVMCPY-UHFFFAOYSA-N

5-MeS-DMT, also known as 5-methylthio-N,N-dimethyltryptamine or as 5-methylthio-DMT, is a lesser-known psychedelic drug of the tryptamine family. It is the 5-methylthio derivative of dimethyltryptamine (DMT) and is an analogue of 5-MeO-DMT.

== Use and effects ==
In his book TiHKAL (Tryptamines I Have Known and Loved), Alexander Shulgin lists the dose as 15 to 30 mg smoked and its duration as less than 1 hour. In individual reports, the duration was 10 to 30 minutes. The effects included feeling stoned and no visuals, among others. It was also described as coming on very fast and being quite intense. The drug is said to be about half as potent as 5-MeO-DMT.

== Pharmacology ==
=== Pharmacodynamics ===
5-MeS-DMT was less potent than 5-MeO-DMT and psilocin (4-HO-DMT) but more potent than 4-MeO-DMT or 4-MeS-DMT in rodent behavioral studies. It is known produce generalization with 5-MeO-DMT in rodent drug discrimination tests, with only slightly lower potency in comparison.

== Chemistry ==
=== Synthesis ===
The chemical synthesis of 5-MeS-DMT has been described.

=== Analogues ===
Analogues of 5-MeS-DMT include dimethyltryptamine (DMT), 5-MeO-DMT, 5,N,N-TMT (5-methyl-DMT; 5-Me-DMT), HBL20016 (5-MeS-6-F-DMT), and HBL20017 (4-F-5-MeS-DMT), among others.

== History ==
It was first described in the scientific literature by Richard Glennon and colleagues by 1982. However, 5-MeS-DMT was synthesized and tested by Shulgin as early as 1979.

== See also ==
- Substituted tryptamine
