= 4-Methyl-DMT =

Clinical data
- Other names: 4-Me-DMT; 4-Methyl-N,N-dimethyltryptamine; 4,N,N-Trimethyltryptamine; 4,N,N-TMT; 4-TMT
- Drug class: Serotonin receptor modulator; Serotonergic psychedelic; Hallucinogen
- ATC code: None

Identifiers
- IUPAC name: N,N-dimethyl-2-(4-methyl-1H-indol-3-yl)ethanamine
- CAS Number: 28289-23-8
- PubChem CID: 54308858
- ChemSpider: 96349687

Chemical and physical data
- Formula: C_{13}H_{18}N_{2}
- Molar mass: 202.301 g·mol^{−1}
- 3D model (JSmol): Interactive image
- SMILES: CC1=C2C(=CC=C1)NC=C2CCN(C)C
- InChI: InChI=1S/C13H18N2/c1-10-5-4-6-12-13(10)11(9-14-12)7-8-15(2)3/h4-6,9,14H,7-8H2,1-3H3; Key:SJLWCURJFQWOAR-UHFFFAOYSA-N

4-Methyl-DMT, or 4-Me-DMT, also known as 4-methyl-N,N-dimethyltryptamine or as 4,N,N-trimethyltryptamine (4,N,N-TMT or 4-TMT), is a serotonin receptor modulator and possible psychedelic drug of the tryptamine family related to dimethyltryptamine (DMT) and psilocin (4-HO-DMT).

== Use and effects ==
4-Methyl-DMT was not included nor mentioned in Alexander Shulgin's book TiHKAL (Tryptamines I Have Known and Loved). Its dose in humans is unknown.

The related drug 4-methyl-AMT has shown mixed findings in terms of hallucinogenic effects in humans and is clearly less potent than α-methyltryptamine (AMT) in such regards.

== Pharmacology ==
=== Pharmacodynamics ===
4-Methyl-DMT showed affinity for the serotonin receptors in the isolated rat stomach fundus strip (A_{2} = 141 nM). Its affinity for these receptors was 7-fold higher than that of dimethyltryptamine (DMT), roughly the same as that of psilocin (4-HO-DMT), and about 60% of that of 5-MeO-DMT. However, this assay was subsequently found to be an unreliable predictor of hallucinogenic activity. The receptor in this tissue may correspond to the serotonin 5-HT_{2B} receptor.

In other studies, 4-methyl-DMT was assessed and showed affinity for the serotonin 5-HT_{1E} receptor (K_{i} = 470 nM) and for the serotonin 5-HT_{1F} receptor (K_{i} = 198 nM). These affinities were similar to but slightly lower than those of DMT (K_{i} = 300 nM and 130 nM, respectively).

Like DMT and 5-MeO-DMT, 4-methyl-DMT fully substituted for the psychedelic drug DOM in rodent drug discrimination tests. It was a little more than twice as potent as DMT in this assay but was about half as potent as 5-MeO-DMT. Similarly to diethyltryptamine (DET) and dipropyltryptamine (DPT), 4-methyl-DMT produced behavioral disruption at higher doses.

== Chemistry ==
=== Synthesis ===
The chemical synthesis of 4-methyl-DMT has been described.

=== Analogues ===
Analogues of 4-methyl-DMT include dimethyltryptamine (DMT), psilocin (4-HO-DMT), 4-fluoro-DMT, 4-MeO-DMT, 4-MeO-DET, 1-methyl-DMT, 2-methyl-DMT, 4-methyl-AMT, 4-methyl-AET, 5-methyl-DMT, 6-methyl-DMT, 7-methyl-DMT, and RS134-49 (4-methyl-THPI), among others.

== History ==
4-Methyl-DMT was first described in the scientific literature by Richard Glennon and colleagues by 1983.

== Society and culture ==
=== Legal status ===
==== Canada ====
4-Methyl-DMT is not an explicitly nor implicitly controlled substance in Canada as of 2025.

==== United States ====
4-Methyl-DMT is not an explicitly controlled substance in the United States. However, it could be considered a controlled substance under the Federal Analogue Act if intended for human consumption.

== See also ==
- Substituted tryptamine
