= 4-MeO-DiPT =

Chemical compound

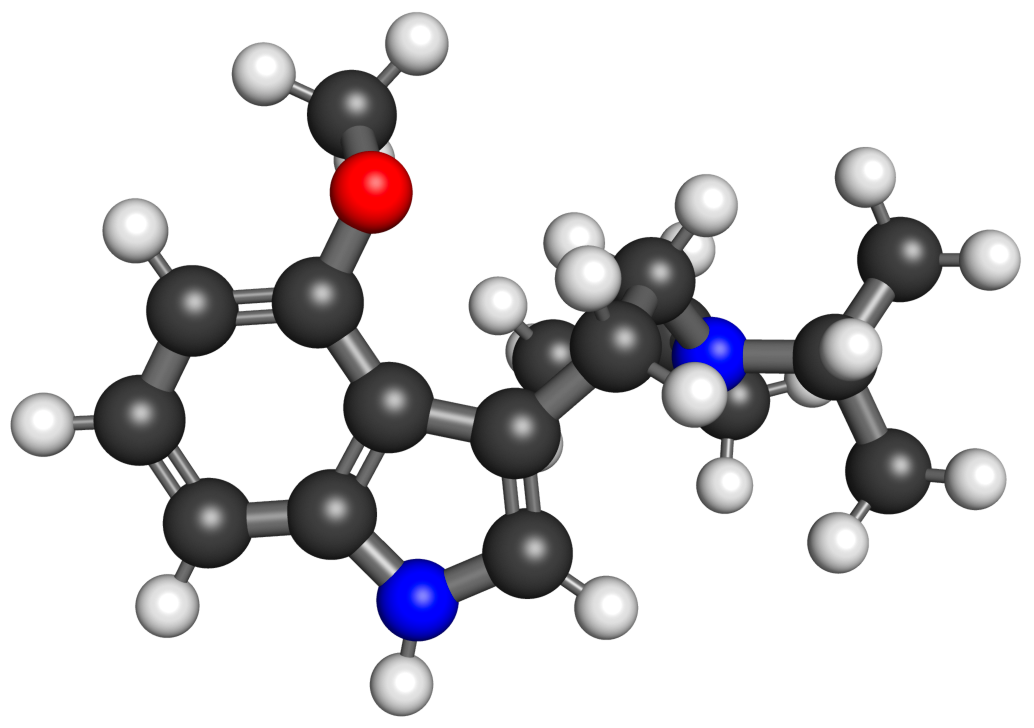

Clinical data
- Other names: 4-OMe-DiPT; 4-Methoxy-N,N-diisopropyltryptamine; D-4200; N,N-Diisopropyl-4-methoxytryptamine
- Drug class: Non-selective serotonin receptor agonist; Serotonin 5-HT_{2A} receptor agonist; Serotonin reuptake inhibitor
- ATC code: None

Identifiers
- IUPAC name: N-Isopropyl-N-[2-(4-methoxy-1H-indol-3-yl)ethyl]-2-propanamine
- PubChem CID: 24802108
- ChemSpider: 21436143
- CompTox Dashboard (EPA): DTXSID401342570

Chemical and physical data
- Formula: C_{17}H_{26}N_{2}O
- Molar mass: 274.408 g·mol^{−1}
- 3D model (JSmol): Interactive image
- SMILES: CC(C)N(CCC1=CNC2=C1C(=CC=C2)OC)C(C)C
- InChI: InChI=1S/C17H26N2O/c1-12(2)19(13(3)4)10-9-14-11-18-15-7-6-8-16(20-5)17(14)15/h6-8,11-13,18H,9-10H2,1-5H3; Key:WIVWUNUDMXNQJD-UHFFFAOYSA-N

4-MeO-DiPT, also known as 4-methoxy-N,N-diisopropyltryptamine, is a novel serotonin receptor modulator of the tryptamine family related to known psychedelic tryptamines like psilocin (4-HO-DMT) and 5-MeO-DMT. It is the 4-methoxy analog of DiPT and the O-methyl ether of 4-HO-DiPT. Very little data exists about the human use, metabolism, and toxicity of 4-MeO-DiPT.

== Use and effects ==
4-MeO-DiPT is not known to have been assessed in humans. It is unknown whether the drug produces psychedelic effects in humans.

== Pharmacology ==
=== Pharmacodynamics ===
4-MeO-DiPT activities
Target	Affinity (K_{i}, nM)
5-HT_{1A}	2,830–3, (K_{i}); 1,930–3,029 (EC_{50}); 94–113% (E_{max})
5-HT_{2A}	500 (K_{i}); 109–870^{a} (EC_{50}); 92^{a}–97% (E_{max})
5-HT_{2B}	21 (EC_{50}); 101% (E_{max})
5-HT_{2C}	833 (K_{i}); 113–179^{a} (EC_{50}); 85^{a}-103% (E_{max})
SERT	12 (K_{i}); 11–17 (IC_{50})
NET	9,844
DAT	>10,000
Notes: The smaller the value, the more avidly the drug interacts with the site. Footnotes: ^{a} = Stimulation of IP_{1} formation. Sources:

4-MeO-DiPT acts as a serotonin reuptake inhibitor and non-selective serotonin receptor agonist, including of the serotonin 5-HT_{2A}, and 5-HT_{2C} receptors. It shows the highest potency as a serotonin reuptake inhibitor with 40- to 50-fold selectivity for the serotonin transporter (SERT) over the 5-HT_{2A} receptor, moderate potency as an agonist of the 5-HT_{2C} receptor, and low potency with high efficacy as an agonist of the 5-HT_{1A} receptor. Affinities towards receptors outside of the serotonin receptor family have not yet been assessed.

Increased extracellular concentrations of serotonin, resulting from SERT blockade, similarly to 4-MeO-MiPT may compete at 5-HT_{2A}, altering or blunting effects mediated by this receptor. This profile makes 4-MeO-DiPT a potential candidate for elucidating the role of SERT blockade in the mechanisms underlying serotonergic psychedelic action.

== Chemistry ==
4-MeO-DiPT is a synthetic derivative of the substituted tryptamine and 4-methoxytryptamine families. It is the 4-methoxy analogue of N,N-diisopropyltryptamine (DiPT) and the O-methyl ether of 4-HO-DiPT.

=== Analogues ===
Analogues of 4-MeO-DiPT include N,N-diisopropyltryptamine (DiPT), 4-methoxytryptamine (4-MeO-T), 4-MeO-MiPT, 4-MeO-DMT, 4-HO-DiPT, 4-AcO-DiPT, 5-MeO-DiPT, 5-MeO-DMT, and psilocin (4-HO-DMT), among others.

== History ==
4-MeO-DiPT was briefly mentioned by Alexander Shulgin in his 1997 book TiHKAL (Tryptamines I Have Known Loved). Subsequently, it was described and studied further in the early 2020s.

== Society and culture ==
=== Legal status ===
==== United States ====
4-MeO-DiPT is not an explicitly controlled substance in the United States, but may be considered a Schedule I controlled substance in this country as it is a positional isomer of 5-MeO-DiPT.

== See also ==
- Substituted tryptamine
