= HBL20017 =

Clinical data
- Other names: HBL-20017; 4-Fluoro-5-methylthio-N,N-dimethyltryptamine; 4-F-5-MeS-DMT
- Drug class: Serotonin receptor agonist; Serotonin 5-HT_{1A}, 5-HT_{2A}, 5-HT_{2B}, and 5-HT_{2C} receptor agonist; Non-hallucinogenic serotonin 5-HT_{2A} receptor agonist; Antiobsessional agent

Identifiers
- IUPAC name: 2-(4-fluoro-5-methylsulfanyl-1H-indol-3-yl)-N,N-dimethylethanamine
- PubChem CID: 172267333

Chemical and physical data
- Formula: C_{13}H_{17}FN_{2}S
- Molar mass: 252.35 g·mol^{−1}
- 3D model (JSmol): Interactive image
- SMILES: CN(C)CCC1=CNC2=C1C(=C(C=C2)SC)F
- InChI: InChI=1S/C13H17FN2S/c1-16(2)7-6-9-8-15-10-4-5-11(17-3)13(14)12(9)10/h4-5,8,15H,6-7H2,1-3H3; Key:LMEFNTNEKMLVRF-UHFFFAOYSA-N

HBL20017, also known as 4-fluoro-5-methylthio-N,N-dimethyltryptamine (4-F-5-MeS-DMT), is a non-selective and putatively non-hallucinogenic serotonin receptor agonist of the tryptamine family related to 5-MeO-DMT which is being investigated for the potential treatment of obsessive–compulsive disorder (OCD). It is the 4-fluoro derivative of 5-MeS-DMT and the 5-methylthio derivative of 4-fluoro-DMT.

The drug acts as an agonist of the serotonin 5-HT_{1A}, 5-HT_{2A}, 5-HT_{2B}, and 5-HT_{2C} receptors. Its activational potencies (EC_{50}) are 1.21 to 1.84 nM for the serotonin 5-HT_{1A} receptor, 6.37 to 7.95 nM for the serotonin 5-HT_{2A} receptor, 17.1 nM for the serotonin 5-HT_{2B} receptor, and 0.80 to 22.56 nM for the serotonin 5-HT_{2C} receptor. Despite acting as a serotonin 5-HT_{2A} receptor agonist, HBL20017 did not produce the head-twitch response (HTR), a behavioral proxy of psychedelic effects, in rodents, and hence appears to be non-hallucinogenic. A related drug, HBL20016 (5-MeS-6-F-DMT), did robustly produce the HTR on the other hand, and thus may be hallucinogenic.

HBL20017 has shown antiobsessional-like effects in rodents, for instance against obsessive marble burying and obsessive self-grooming. HBL20017 produced antiobsessional effects in SAPAP3 knockout mice (an obsessional self-grooming model) that were apparent within 48 hours and that lasted for as long as 42 days following a single dose. HBL20016 also showed antiobsessional-like effects but was not as effective as HBL20017. HBL20017 might be more effective than psilocybin in terms of antiobsessional effects, at least based on animal studies.

The chemical synthesis of HBL20017 has been described.

HBL20017 was first described in the scientific literature by Alan P. Kozikowski and colleagues in December 2024. It was developed by Negev Labs and Parow Entheobiosciences. The drug is in the preclinical research stage of development.

== See also ==
- Substituted tryptamine
- List of investigational hallucinogens and entactogens
- Non-hallucinogenic 5-HT_{2A} receptor agonist
- HBL20016 (5-MeS-6-F-DMT)
- 4-Fluoro-5-methoxy-DMT (4-F-5-MeO-DMT)
