= 2,α-Dimethyltryptamine =

Chemical compound

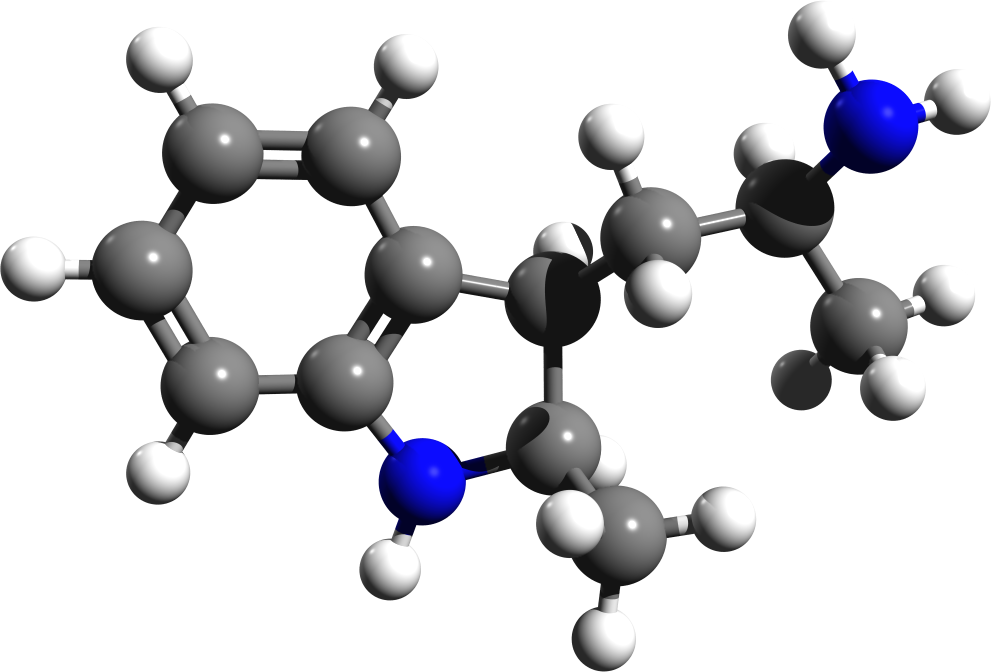

Clinical data
- Other names: 2,α-DMT; 2-Methyl-α-methyltryptamine; 2-Methyl-AMT; 2-Methyl-αMT; 2-Me-AMT; 2-Me-αMT
- Routes of administration: Oral
- ATC code: None

Identifiers
- IUPAC name: 1-(2-methyl-1H-indol-3-yl)propan-2-amine
- CAS Number: 4966-28-3
- ChemSpider: 23511903
- UNII: QAH3JR2679

Chemical and physical data
- Formula: C_{12}H_{16}N_{2}
- Molar mass: 188.274 g·mol^{−1}
- 3D model (JSmol): Interactive image
- SMILES: Cc1c(c2ccccc2[nH]1)CC(C)N
- InChI: InChI=1S/C12H16N2/c1-8(13)7-11-9(2)14-12-6-4-3-5-10(11)12/h3-6,8,14H,7,13H2,1-2H3; Key:AXZQFXRPULJFQK-UHFFFAOYSA-N

2,α-Dimethyltryptamine (2,α-DMT), also known as 2-methyl-α-methyltryptamine (2-Me-αMT or 2-Me-AMT), is a tryptamine and a lesser-known psychedelic drug. It is the 2,α-dimethyl analogue of DMT and the 2-methyl derivative of α-methyltryptamine (αMT or AMT).

== Use and effects ==
In his book TiHKAL (Tryptamines I Have Known and Loved), Alexander Shulgin lists 2,α-DMT's dose as 300 to 500 mg orally and its duration as 7 to 10 hours. The effects of 2,α-DMT have been reported to include feeling intoxicated or drunk-like, feeling good and peaceful, things feeling softer and richer, brighter lights, flashes on edge of visual field, daydreaming with music, completely clear thinking, eating food being an adventure, facial tingling, impaired motor coordination, easy sleep, and next-day dehydration.

== Chemistry ==
=== Synthesis ===
The chemical synthesis of 2,α-DMT has been described.

=== Analogues ===
Analogues of 2,α-DMT (2-methyl-AMT) include 2-methyltryptamine (2-MT or 2-Me-T), 2,N,N-TMT (2-methyl-DMT), 2-methyl-DET, and 5-MeO-2-TMT (2-methyl-5-MeO-DMT), among others.

== History ==
The chemical synthesis of 2,α-DMT was first reported in 1965.

== See also ==
- Substituted tryptamine
