= 2-Methyl-iPALT =

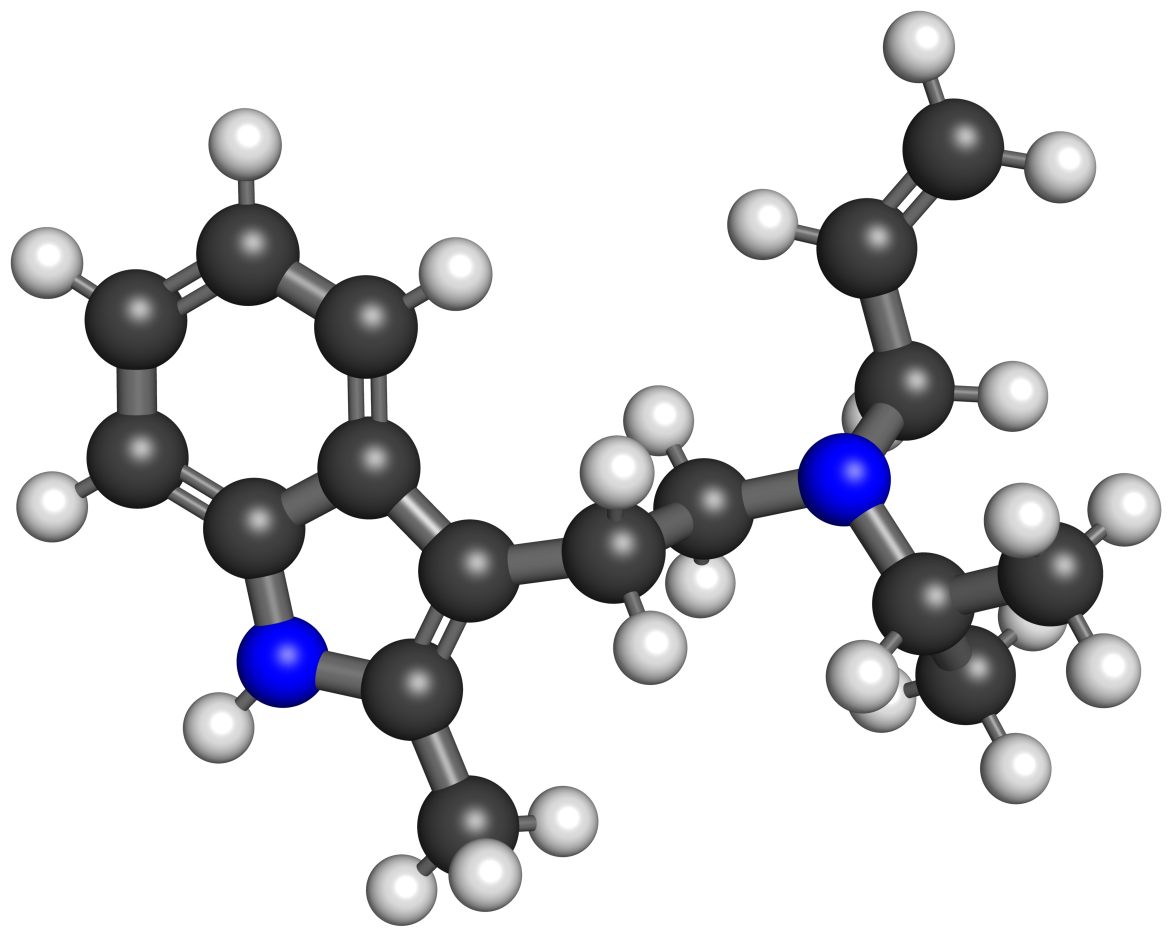

Clinical data
- Other names: 2-Me-iPALT; 2-Methyl-ALiPT; 2-Me-ALiPT; ASR-3002; ASR3002; 2-Methyl-N-isopropyl-N-allyltryptamine; 2-Methyl-N-allyl-N-isopropyltryptamine
- Drug class: Serotonin receptor modulator; Serotonin 5-HT_{2A} receptor agonist
- ATC code: None

Identifiers
- IUPAC name: N-[2-(2-methyl-1H-indol-3-yl)ethyl]-N-prop-2-enylpropan-2-amine
- CAS Number: 2915652-49-0
- PubChem CID: 167499858

Chemical and physical data
- Formula: C_{17}H_{24}N_{2}
- Molar mass: 256.393 g·mol^{−1}
- 3D model (JSmol): Interactive image
- SMILES: CC1=C(C2=CC=CC=C2N1)CCN(CC=C)C(C)C
- InChI: InChI=1S/C17H24N2/c1-5-11-19(13(2)3)12-10-15-14(4)18-17-9-7-6-8-16(15)17/h5-9,13,18H,1,10-12H2,2-4H3; Key:QXAIQMVRYZDEJS-UHFFFAOYSA-N

2-Methyl-iPALT, or 2-methyl-ALiPT, also known as 2-methyl-N-isopropyl-N-allyltryptamine or by its developmental code name ASR-3002, is a serotonin receptor modulator of the tryptamine family. It is the 2-methyl derivative of iPALT. The drug is very similar in structure to 2-methyl-DiPT, which Alexander Shulgin hypothesized would be a DiPT-like selective auditory hallucinogen but never synthesized nor tested.

== Pharmacology ==
=== Pharmacodynamics ===
2-Methyl-iPALT is a non-selective serotonin receptor agonist, including of the serotonin 5-HT_{1B}, 5-HT_{2A}, 5-HT_{2B}, and 5-HT_{6} receptors, but not of the serotonin 5-HT_{1A} receptor. However, it shows rather low, micromolar potency for most of these actions, with for example 264-fold lower potency as a serotonin 5-HT_{2A} receptor agonist than the known psychedelic drug 5-MeO-iPALT (ASR-3001). The drug is inactive as a monoamine reuptake inhibitor.

== Chemistry ==
=== Synthesis ===
The chemical synthesis of 2-methyl-iPALT has been described.

=== Analogues ===
Analogues of 2-methyl-iPALT include 5-MeO-iPALT (ASR-3001), 4-HO-iPALT, 2-methyl-DMT, 2-methyl-DET, and 2-methyl-DiPT, among others.

== History ==
2-Methyl-iPALT was patented by the Alexander Shulgin Research Institute (ASRI) in 2024.

== See also ==
- Substituted tryptamine
