= 4,5-MDO-DiPT =

Chemical compound

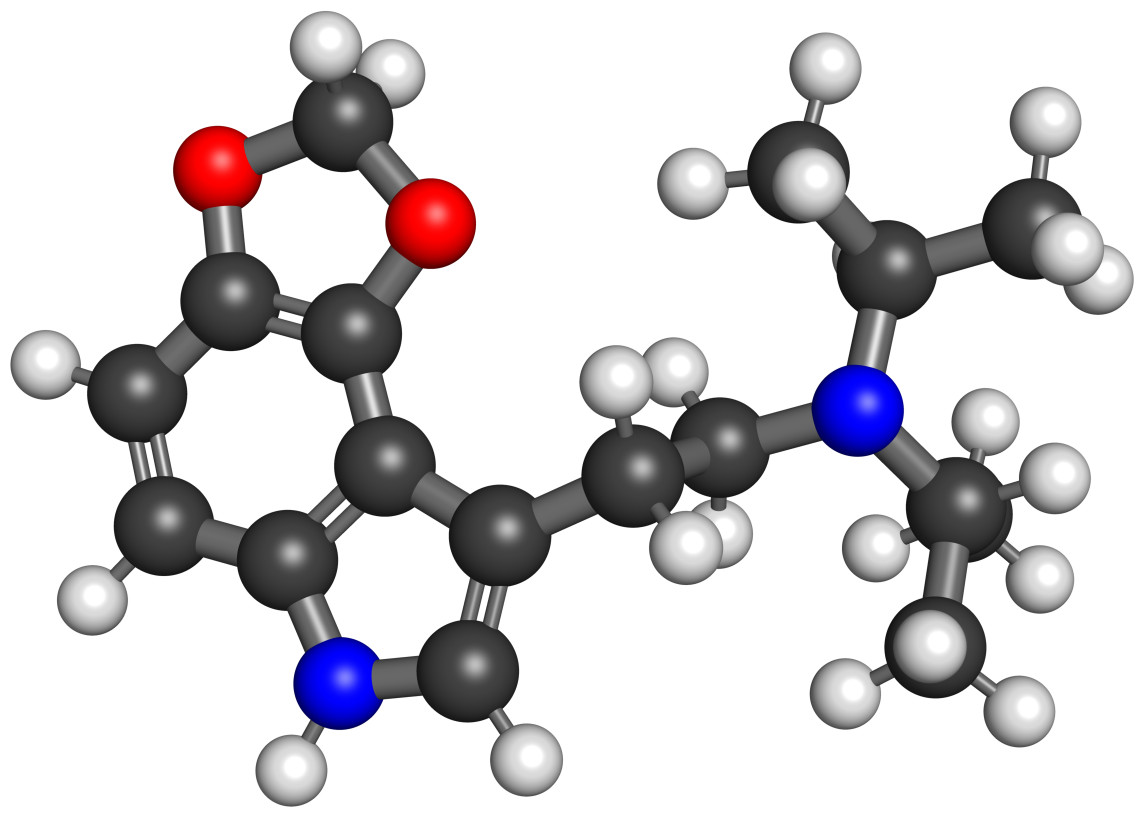

Clinical data
- Other names: 4,5-Methylenedioxy-N,N-diisopropyltryptamine
- Routes of administration: Oral
- Drug class: Serotonergic psychedelic; Hallucinogen
- ATC code: None

Pharmacokinetic data
- Duration of action: Unknown

Identifiers
- IUPAC name: N-[2-(6H-[1,3]dioxolo[4,5-e]indol-8-yl)ethyl]-N-propan-2-ylpropan-2-amine
- CAS Number: 82173-82-8
- PubChem CID: 44383444
- ChemSpider: 23511907
- UNII: VTE2RS8757
- ChEMBL: ChEMBL352315
- CompTox Dashboard (EPA): DTXSID901336588

Chemical and physical data
- Formula: C_{17}H_{24}N_{2}O_{2}
- Molar mass: 288.391 g·mol^{−1}
- 3D model (JSmol): Interactive image
- SMILES: CC(C)N(CCC1=CNC2=C1C3=C(C=C2)OCO3)C(C)C
- InChI: InChI=1S/C17H24N2O2/c1-11(2)19(12(3)4)8-7-13-9-18-14-5-6-15-17(16(13)14)21-10-20-15/h5-6,9,11-12,18H,7-8,10H2,1-4H3; Key:PTYYWSKZYOSFEK-UHFFFAOYSA-N

4,5-MDO-DiPT, also known as 4,5-methylenedioxy-N,N-diisopropyltryptamine, is a lesser-known psychedelic drug of the tryptamine family. It is the 4,5-methylenedioxy derivative of diisopropyltryptamine (DiPT) and is an analogue of 4-HO-DiPT and 5-MeO-DiPT.

== Use and effects ==
In his book TiHKAL (Tryptamines I Have Known and Loved), Alexander Shulgin lists the dose of 4,5-MDO-DiPT as greater than 25 mg orally, whereas the duration is listed as unknown. At a dose of 25 mg, nothing happened for 3 hours, then the drug suddenly onset and produced LSD-like psychedelic effects, with a plateau that lasted for a fair amount of time. Higher doses were not explored.

== Pharmacology ==
Very little data exists about the pharmacological properties, metabolism, and toxicity of 4,5-MDO-DiPT.

== Chemistry ==
=== Synthesis ===
The chemical synthesis of 4,5-MDO-DiPT has been described.

=== Analogues ===
Analogues of 4,5-MDO-DiPT include diisopropyltryptamine (DiPT), 4-HO-DiPT, 5-MeO-DiPT, 4,5-MDO-DMT, 5,6-MDO-DiPT, and 4,5-DHP-DMT, among others. Another analogue of 4,5-MDO-DiPT, known as 4,5-MDO-MiPT, has also been described, but has not been synthesized nor tested in humans.

== History ==
4,5-MDO-DiPT was first described in the scientific literature by Toni B. Kline and colleagues in 1982. Subsequently, it was further described by Alexander Shulgin in his 1997 book TiHKAL (Tryptamines I Have Known and Loved).

== See also ==
- Substituted tryptamine
