= ST-1936 =

Chemical compound

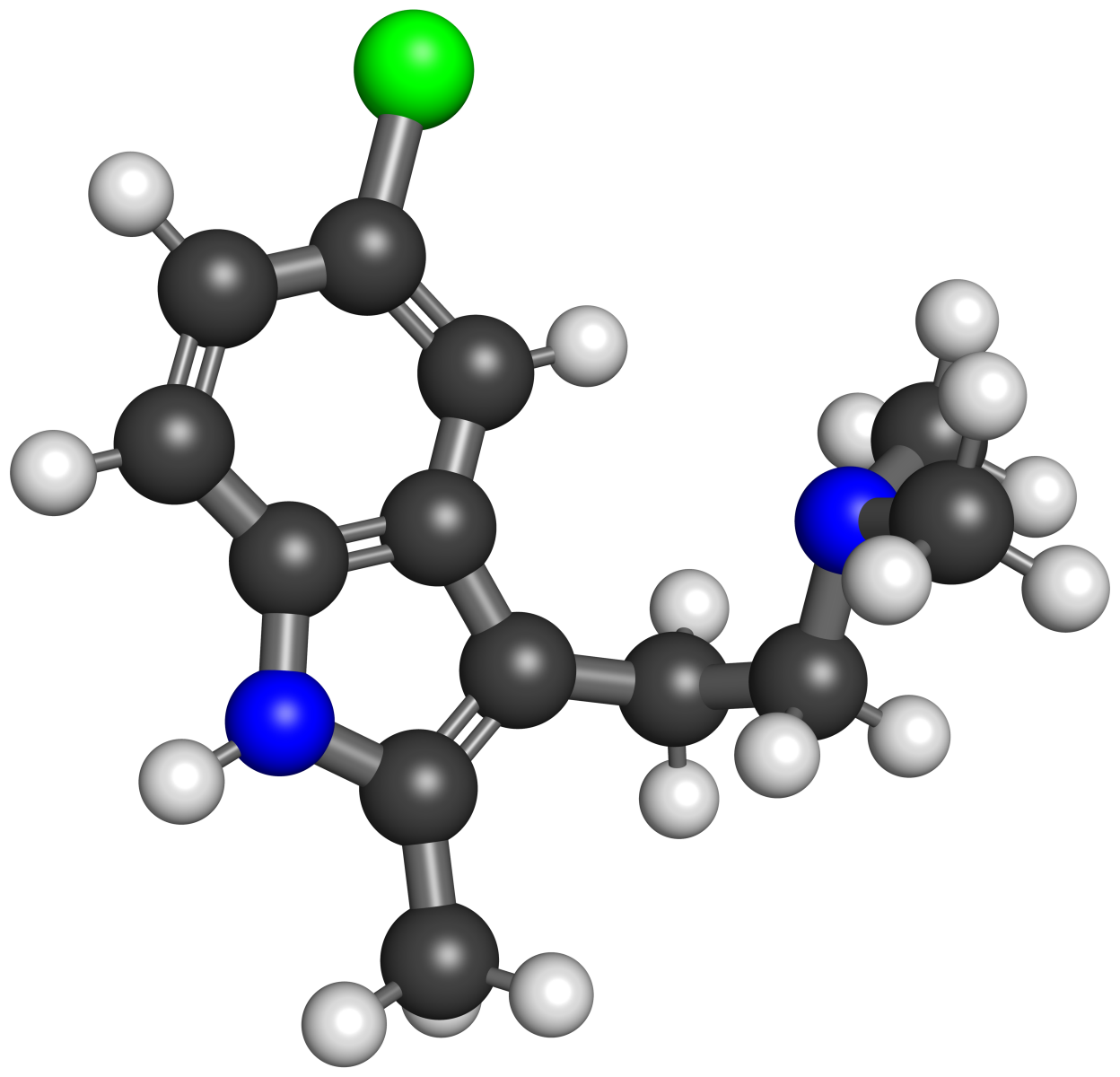

Clinical data
- Other names: 2-Methyl-5-chloro-N,N-dimethyltryptamine; 2-Methyl-5-chloro-DMT; 2-Me-5-Cl-DMT
- ATC code: none

Identifiers
- IUPAC name: 2-(2-methyl-5-chloro-1H-indol-3-yl)-N,N-dimethylethanamine
- CAS Number: 1210-81-7
- PubChem CID: 9921064
- ChemSpider: 8096699
- UNII: 4R5ZNV2CHC
- ChEMBL: ChEMBL365751
- CompTox Dashboard (EPA): DTXSID001045649

Chemical and physical data
- Formula: C_{13}H_{17}ClN_{2}
- Molar mass: 236.74 g·mol^{−1}
- 3D model (JSmol): Interactive image
- SMILES: CC1=C(CCN(C)C)C2=CC(Cl)=CC=C2N1
- InChI: InChI=1S/C13H17ClN2/c1-9-11(6-7-16(2)3)12-8-10(14)4-5-13(12)15-9/h4-5,8,15H,6-7H2,1-3H3; Key:KSYMELKKLOFABL-UHFFFAOYSA-N

ST-1936, also known as 2-methyl-5-chloro-N,N-dimethyltryptamine (2-methyl-5-chloro-DMT), is a tryptamine derivative which is used in scientific research. It acts as a selective 5-HT_{6} receptor agonist, with a K_{i} of 13 nM, and much weaker action at 5-HT_{2B} and 5-HT_{7} subtypes. In animal studies it has been found to increase dopamine and noradrenaline mediated signalling but decreases glutamatergic transmission, and has antidepressant effects.

== See also ==
- 2-Methyltryptamine
- EMD-386088
- EMDT
- 5-Bromo-DMT
- 5-Chloro-AMT
