= 4-MeO-MiPT =

Chemical compound

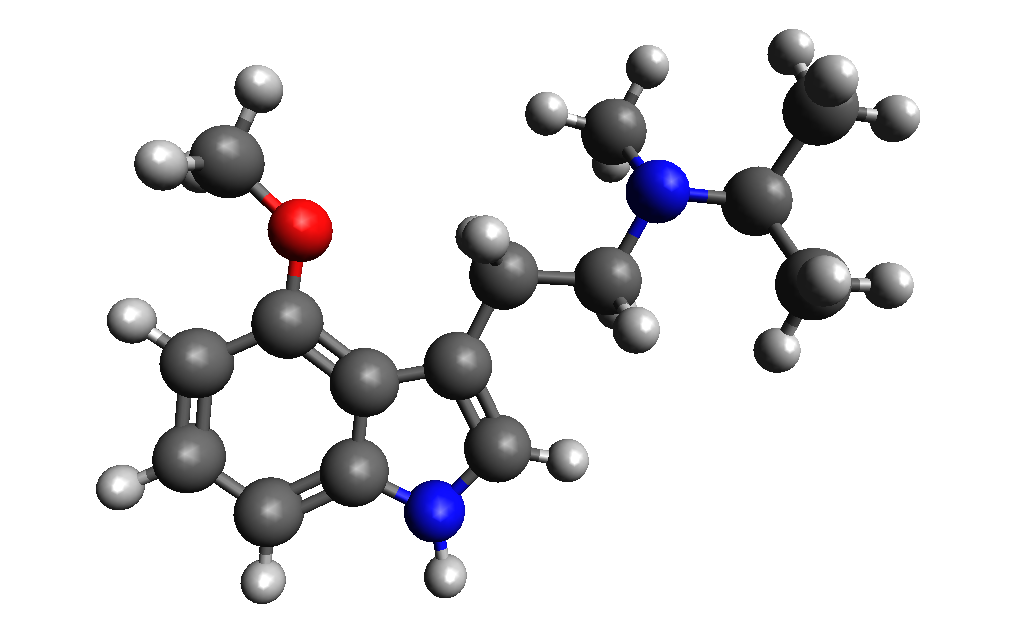

Clinical data
- Other names: 4-OMe-MiPT; 4-Methoxy-N-methyl-N-isopropyltryptamine
- Routes of administration: Oral
- Drug class: Non-selective serotonin receptor agonist; Serotonin 5-HT_{2A} receptor agonist; Serotonergic psychedelic; Hallucinogen; Serotonin reuptake inhibitor
- ATC code: None

Pharmacokinetic data
- Onset of action: 20–40 minutes
- Duration of action: 4–6 hours

Identifiers
- IUPAC name: N-[2-(4-methoxy-1H-indol-3-yl)ethyl]-N-methylpropan-2-amine
- CAS Number: 96096-53-6
- PubChem CID: 29935317
- ChemSpider: 21106243
- UNII: HU85354AY8
- ChEMBL: ChEMBL354500
- CompTox Dashboard (EPA): DTXSID501027181

Chemical and physical data
- Formula: C_{15}H_{22}N_{2}O
- Molar mass: 246.354 g·mol^{−1}
- 3D model (JSmol): Interactive image
- Melting point: 80 to 81 °C (176 to 178 °F)
- SMILES: CC(N(CCC1=CNC2=C1C(OC)=CC=C2)C)C
- InChI: InChI=1S/C15H22N2O/c1-11(2)17(3)9-8-12-10-16-13-6-5-7-14(18-4)15(12)13/h5-7,10-11,16H,8-9H2,1-4H3; Key:BJIWLHLNPTWSGD-UHFFFAOYSA-N

4-MeO-MiPT, also known as 4-methoxy-N-methyl-N-isopropyltryptamine, is a lesser-known psychedelic drug of the tryptamine and 4-methoxytryptamine families. It is the 4-methoxy analogue of MiPT and the O-methyl ether of 4-HO-MiPT. The drug is taken orally.

It acts as a serotonin reuptake inhibitor and as a non-selective serotonin receptor agonist, including of the serotonin 5-HT_{2A} receptor. The drug produces psychedelic-like effects in animals.

4-MeO-MiPT was first described by David Repke and Alexander Shulgin and colleagues in 1985. It was subsequently further described by Shulgin in his 1997 book TiHKAL (Tryptamines I Have Known And Loved). The drug was reported as a novel designer drug by 2016. Very little data exists about the pharmacological properties, metabolism, and toxicity of 4-MeO-MiPT.

== Use and effects ==
Alexander Shulgin found the effective dose of 4-MeO-MiPT to be 20 to 30 mg (or ~0.4 mg/kg body weight of subject) orally; the onset between ingestion and the first noticeable effects was 20 to 40 minutes, with a listed duration of 4 to 6 hours. The effects were significantly milder than those of 4-HO-MiPT, with 4-MeO-MiPT producing erotic-enhancing effects, and few of the visuals common with tryptamines. Online anecdotal reports describe 4-MeO-MiPT as producing mild psychedelic effects with little body load.

== Pharmacology ==
=== Pharmacodynamics ===
4-MeO-MiPT activities
Target	Affinity (K_{i}, nM)
5-HT_{1A}	347–731 (K_{i}); 1,072–1,490 (EC_{50}); 97–99% (E_{max})
5-HT_{1B}	>10,000
5-HT_{1D}	441
5-HT_{1E}	>10,000
5-HT_{2A}	178–470 (K_{i}); 5.6–376^{a} (EC_{50}); 63–90% (E_{max})
5-HT_{2B}	48 (K_{i}); 16.8–53 (EC_{50}); 66–75% (E_{max})
5-HT_{2C}	510–810 (K_{i}); 23–120^{a} (EC_{50}); 77–96% (E_{max})
5-HT_{3}	>10,000
5-HT_{5A}	>10,000
5-HT_{6}	1,004
5-HT_{7}	>10,000
α_{2A}	240
α_{2B}	1,806
α_{2C}	552
H_{1}	>10,000
σ_{1}	1,037
σ_{2}	843
SERT	38–41 (K_{i}); 53–57 (IC_{50})
NET, DAT	>10,000
Notes: The smaller the value, the more avidly the drug interacts with the site. Footnotes: ^{a} = Stimulation of IP_{1} formation. Sources:

4-MeO-MiPT acts as a serotonin reuptake inhibitor (SRI) and non-selective serotonin receptor agonist, including of the serotonin 5-HT_{1A}, 5-HT_{2A}, 5-HT_{2B}, 5-HT_{2C} receptors. The substance additionally displayed sub micromolar affinities at α_{2A}, α_{2C} and σ_{2} receptors.

Increased extracellular concentrations of serotonin, resulting from SERT blockade, similarly may compete at the serotonin 5-HT_{2A} receptor, altering or blunting effects mediated by this receptor, which could potentially explain anecdotal reports of subjective effects being dose-dependently milder than that of 4-HO-MiPT or 5-MeO-MiPT. This profile makes 4-MeO-MiPT a potential candidate for elucidating the role of SERT blockade in the mechanisms underlying serotonergic psychedelic action.

The drug induces the head-twitch response, a behavioral proxy of psychedelic effects, in rodents. Its potency for inducing the head-twitch response in mice is similar to that of 4-HO-MiPT and 4-AcO-MiPT, but the efficacy for doing so is markedly lower: 34 head twitches versus around 77–80 head twitches per 30 minutes for the aforementioned compounds.

== Chemistry ==
4-MeO-MiPT is synthetic derivative of the substituted tryptamine and 4-methoxytryptamine families. It is the 4-methoxy analogue of N-methyl-N-isopropyltryptamine (MiPT) and the O-methyl ether of 4-HO-MiPT.

=== Synthesis ===
The chemical synthesis of 4-MeO-MiPT has been described.

=== Analogues ===
Analogues of 4-MeO-MiPT include N-methyl-N-isopropyltryptamine (MiPT), 4-methoxytryptamine (4-MeO-T), 4-MeO-DiPT, 4-MeO-DMT, 4-HO-MiPT, 4-AcO-MiPT, 5-MeO-MiPT, 5-MeO-DMT, and psilocin (4-HO-DMT), among others.

== History ==
4-MeO-MiPT was first described in the scientific literature by David Repke and Alexander Shulgin and colleagues in 1985. Subsequently, it was described in greater detail by Alexander Shulgin in his 1997 book TiHKAL (Tryptamines I Have Known Loved) as entry #39. The pharmacology of 4-MeO-MiPT was studied and described in the 2020s. It was reported as a novel designer drug by at least 2016.

== Society and culture ==
=== Legal status ===
==== Canada ====
4-MeO-MiPT is not an explicitly nor implicitly controlled substance in Canada as of 2025.

==== United States ====
4-MeO-MiPT is not an explicitly controlled substance in the United States. However, it could be considered a controlled substance under the Federal Analogue Act if intended for human consumption.

== See also ==
- Substituted tryptamine
