= 4-MeO-DMT =

Chemical compound

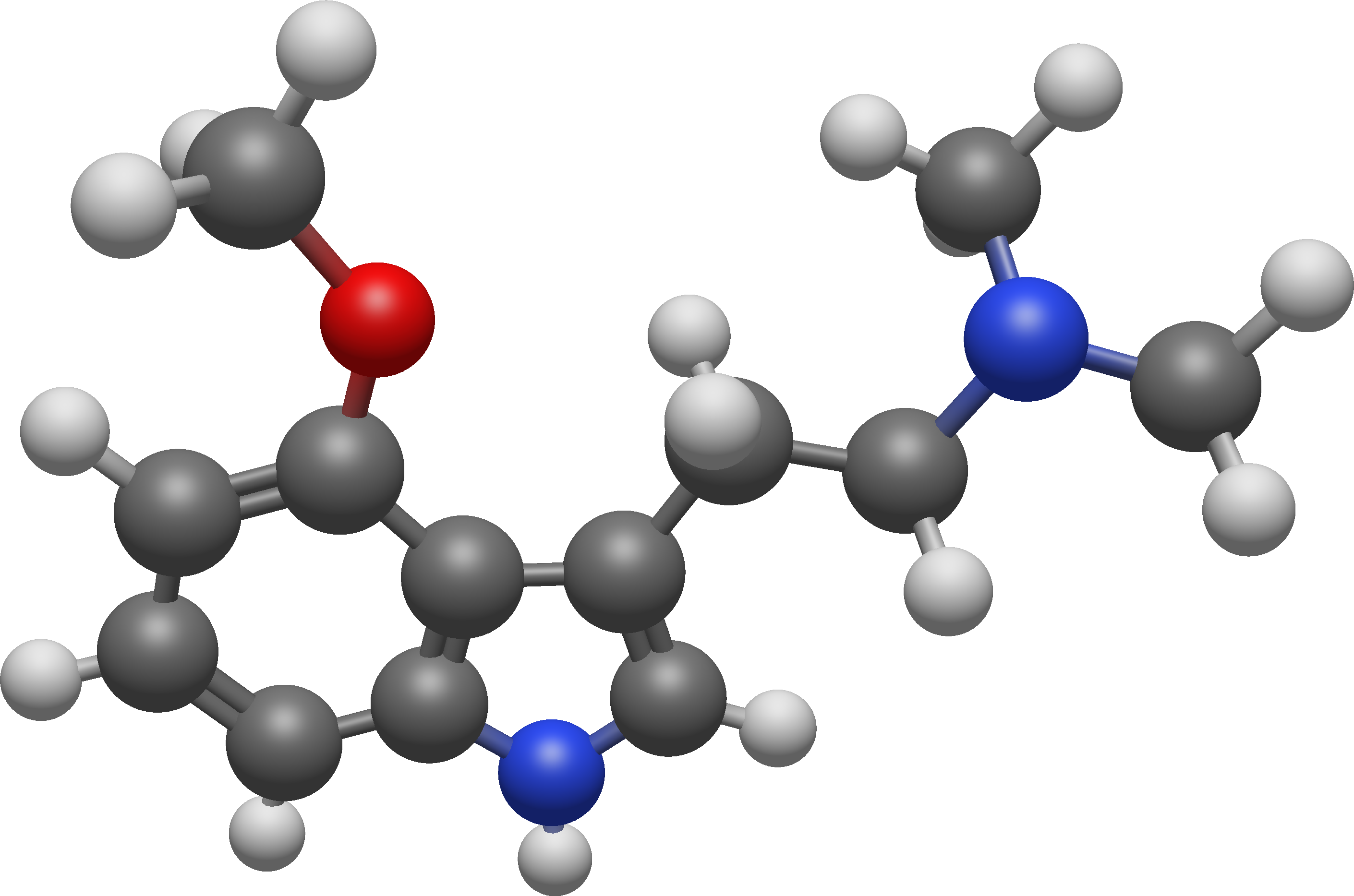

Clinical data
- Other names: 4-OMe-DMT; 4-Methoxy-DMT; 4-Methoxy-N,N-dimethyltryptamine; O-Methylpsilocin; PSOM
- Drug class: Serotonin receptor modulator

Identifiers
- IUPAC name: 2-(4-Methoxy-1H-indol-3-yl)-N,N-dimethylethanamine
- CAS Number: 3965-97-7
- PubChem CID: 12017578
- ChemSpider: 23126449
- UNII: X4NBI2F334
- ChEMBL: ChEMBL32029
- CompTox Dashboard (EPA): DTXSID20475892

Chemical and physical data
- Formula: C_{13}H_{18}N_{2}O
- Molar mass: 218.300 g·mol^{−1}
- 3D model (JSmol): Interactive image
- SMILES: CN(C)CCC1=CNC2=CC=CC(OC)=C21
- InChI: InChI=1S/C13H18N2O/c1-15(2)8-7-10-9-14-11-5-4-6-12(16-3)13(10)11/h4-6,9,14H,7-8H2,1-3H3; Key:HFYHBTWTJDAYGW-UHFFFAOYSA-N

4-MeO-DMT, or 4-methoxy-DMT, also known as 4-methoxy-N,N-dimethyltryptamine or as O-methylpsilocin (PSOM), is a serotonin receptor modulator and possible psychedelic drug of the tryptamine and 4-hydroxytryptamine families. It is the O-methylated analogue of psilocin (4-HO-DMT) and a positional isomer of 5-MeO-DMT.

== Use and effects ==
According to Alexander Shulgin in his book TiHKAL (Tryptamines I Have Known and Loved), 4-MeO-DMT is not known to have been tested in humans. However, the N,N-diethyl analogue 4-MeO-DET has been tested in humans and was found to be completely inactive at doses of up to 30 mg orally or smoked.

== Pharmacology ==
=== Pharmacodynamics ===
4-MeO-DMT activities
Target	Affinity (K_{i}, nM)
5-HT_{1A}	235 (K_{i}); 352 (EC_{50}); 103% (E_{max})
5-HT_{2A}	68–1,300 (K_{i}); 21 (EC_{50}); 76% (E_{max})
5-HT_{2B}	9 (EC_{50}); 58% (E_{max})
5-HT_{2C}	340 (K_{i}); 4 (EC_{50}); 100% (E_{max})
SERT	903 (IC_{50})
NET, DAT	>10,000
Notes: The smaller the value, the more avidly the drug interacts with the site. Sources:

4-MeO-DMT has shown high affinity for several serotonin receptors, including the serotonin 5-HT_{1A} receptor, the serotonin 5-HT_{2A} receptor, and the serotonin 5-HT_{2C} receptor. Compared to 5-MeO-DMT, 4-MeO-DMT had similar affinity for the serotonin 5-HT_{2A} receptor, but showed much lower affinity (21-fold) for the serotonin 5-HT_{1A} receptor. The drug shows pronounced biased agonism at the serotonin 5-HT_{2C} receptor.

4-MeO-DMT produces serotonergic psychedelic-like effects in animals, including rodents and monkeys. It has been found to disrupt object size discrimination performance in monkeys, suggesting that it may have psychedelic effects in humans. However, whereas 5-MeO-DMT has greater potency than bufotenin (5-HO-DMT), 4-MeO-DMT has lower potency than psilocybin (4-PO-DMT). This may be due to the fact that the lipophilicity of psilocin is not importantly enhanced by O-methylation, in contrast to the case of bufotenin, which has associated limitations in terms of blood–brain barrier permeability. Besides psilocin/psilocybin, 4-MeO-DMT is also less potent than 5-MeO-DMT.

4-MeO-DMT fully substituted for DOM in rodent drug discrimination tests, with an ED_{50} of about 3.53 mg/kg and about 3-fold lower potency than 5-MeO-DMT. 4-MeO-DMT also substituted for 5-MeO-DMT in rodent drug discrimination tests, with an ED_{50} of 3.47 μmol/kg and about 2.7-fold lower potency than 5-MeO-DMT. Despite its activity in drug discrimination tests however, 4-MeO-DMT fails to produce the head-twitch response in rodents. This may in part be related to the drug's unusually potent serotonin 5-HT_{1A} receptor agonism.

== Chemistry ==
=== Analogues ===
Analogues of 4-MeO-DMT include dimethyltryptamine (DMT), 4-methoxytryptamine (4-MT or 4-MeO-T), psilocin (4-HO-DMT), 4-AcO-DMT (psilacetin), 4-MeO-DET, 4-MeO-DiPT, 4-MeO-MiPT, 4-methyl-DMT, 5-MeO-DMT, 6-MeO-DMT, and 7-MeO-DMT, among others.

== History ==
4-MeO-DMT was first described in the scientific literature by at least 1968.

== Society and culture ==
=== Legal status ===
==== Canada ====
4-MeO-DMT is not a controlled substance in Canada.

==== United States ====
In the United States, 4-MeO-DMT is a Schedule I controlled substance as it is a positional isomer of 5-MeO-DMT.

== See also ==
- Substituted tryptamine
