= 5,6-MDO-DiPT =

Chemical compound

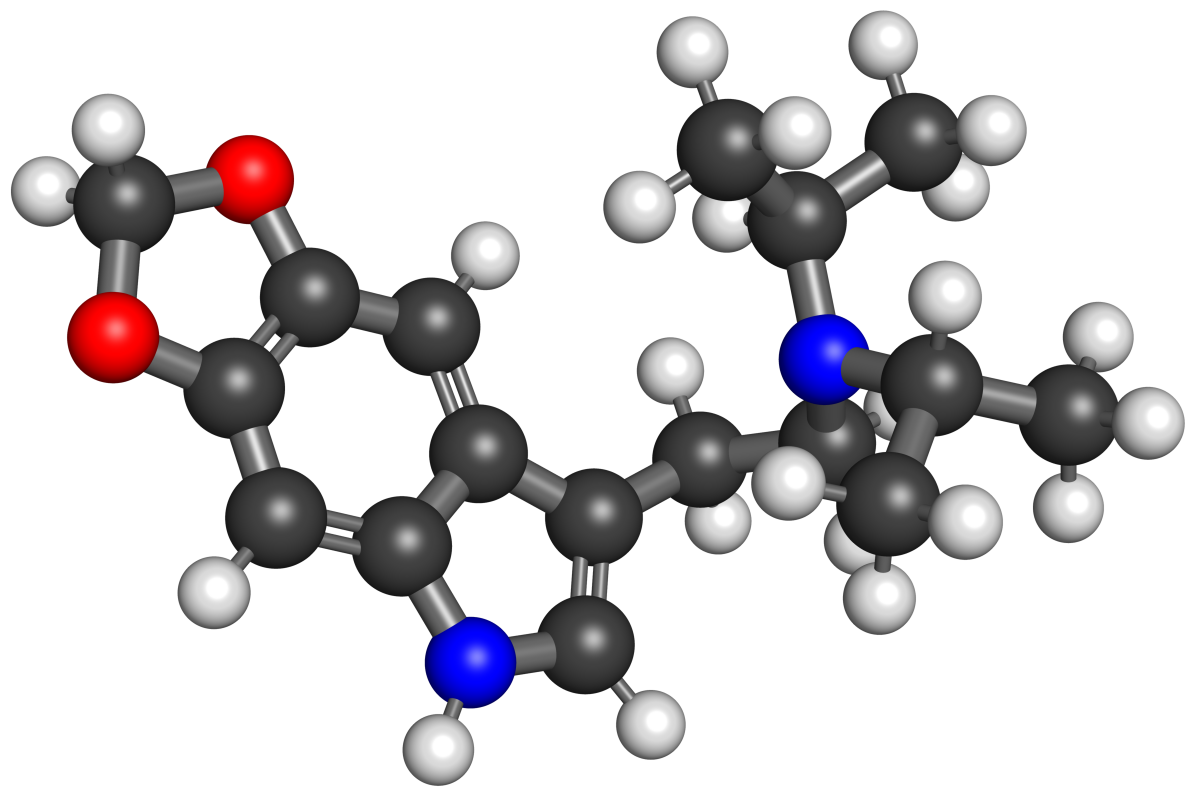

Clinical data
- Other names: 5,6-Methylenedioxy-N,N-diisopropyltryptamine
- Routes of administration: Unknown
- ATC code: None

Pharmacokinetic data
- Onset of action: Unknown
- Duration of action: Unknown

Identifiers
- IUPAC name: N-[2-(5H-[1,3]dioxolo[4,5-f]indol-7-yl)ethyl]-N-propan-2-ylpropan-2-amine
- PubChem CID: 13141004
- ChemSpider: 10524336
- UNII: 9P8WPL88C4
- ChEMBL: ChEMBL368261
- CompTox Dashboard (EPA): DTXSID201336587

Chemical and physical data
- Formula: C_{17}H_{24}N_{2}O_{2}
- Molar mass: 288.391 g·mol^{−1}
- 3D model (JSmol): Interactive image
- SMILES: CC(C)N(CCC1=CNC2=CC3=C(C=C21)OCO3)C(C)C
- InChI: InChI=1S/C17H24N2O2/c1-11(2)19(12(3)4)6-5-13-9-18-15-8-17-16(7-14(13)15)20-10-21-17/h7-9,11-12,18H,5-6,10H2,1-4H3; Key:MAICYUOZXYUWMJ-UHFFFAOYSA-N

5,6-MDO-DiPT, also known as 5,6-methylenedioxy-N,N-diisopropyltryptamine, is a lesser-known chemical compound of the tryptamine family. It is the 5,6-methylenedioxy derivative of diisopropyltryptamine (DiPT) and is an analogue of 5-MeO-DiPT. The drug is included as an entry in Alexander Shulgin's 1991 book TiHKAL (Tryptamines I Have Known and Loved). However, Shulgin did not test 5,6-MDO-DiPT and its dose, duration, and effects are unknown. Very little data exists about the pharmacological properties, metabolism, and toxicity of 5,6-MDO-DiPT. Its chemical synthesis has been described. The drug was first described in the scientific literature by Toni B. Kline and colleagues in 1982.

== See also ==
- Substituted tryptamine
- 4,5-MDO-DiPT
