= EMDT =

Chemical compound

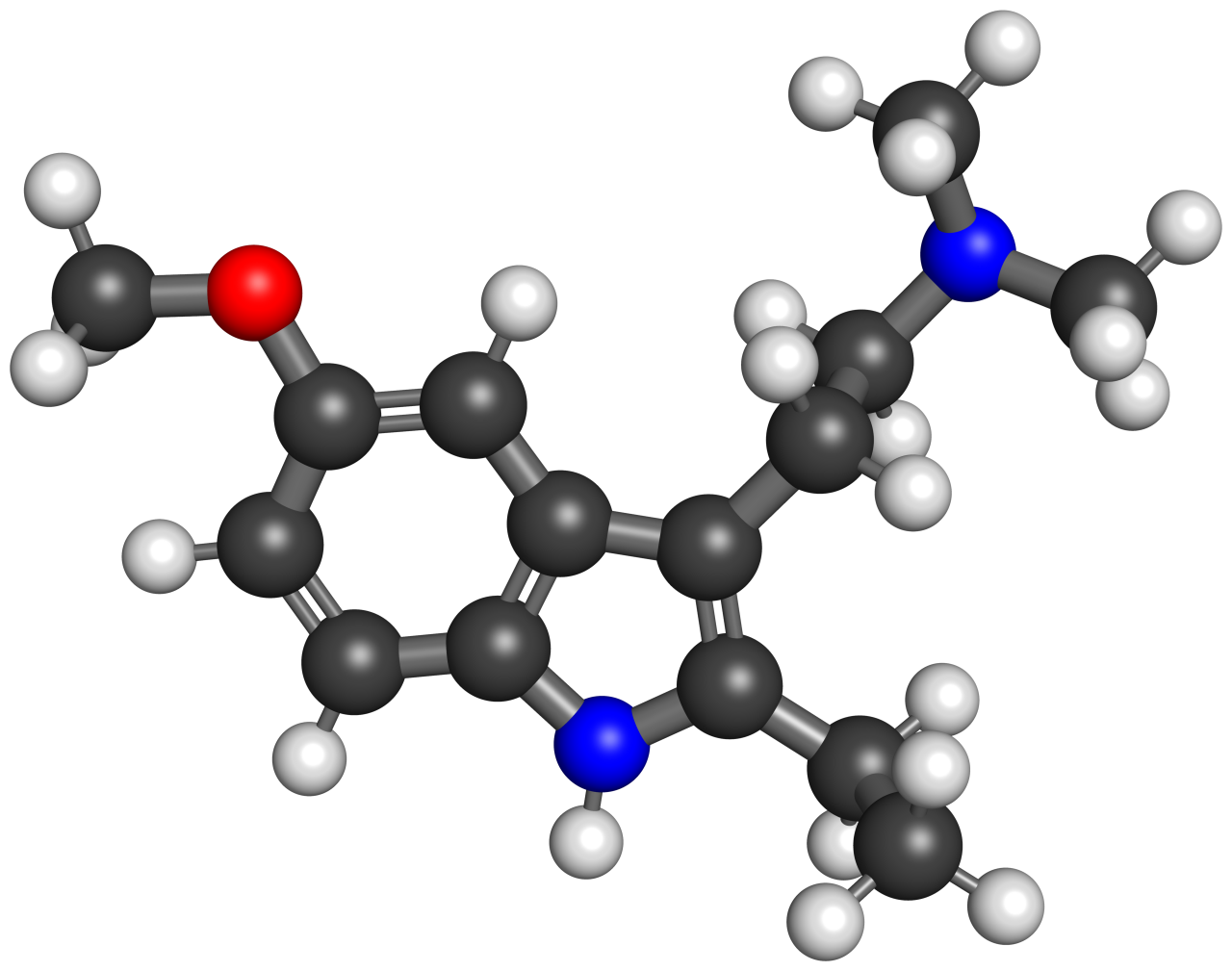

Clinical data
- Other names: 2-Ethyl-5-methoxy-N,N-dimethyltryptamine; 2-Ethyl-5-MeO-DMT; 2-Et-5-MeO-DMT
- ATC code: none

Identifiers
- IUPAC name: 2-(2-ethyl-5-methoxy-1H-indol-3-yl)-N,N-dimethylethanamine
- CAS Number: 263744-72-5
- PubChem CID: 6918513
- IUPHAR/BPS: 12
- ChemSpider: 5293710
- UNII: GWM65988LJ
- ChEMBL: ChEMBL267615
- CompTox Dashboard (EPA): DTXSID301336792

Chemical and physical data
- Formula: C_{15}H_{22}N_{2}O
- Molar mass: 246.354 g·mol^{−1}
- 3D model (JSmol): Interactive image
- SMILES: CCc2[nH]c1ccc(OC)cc1c2CCN(C)C
- InChI: InChI=1S/C15H22N2O/c1-5-14-12(8-9-17(2)3)13-10-11(18-4)6-7-15(13)16-14/h6-7,10,16H,5,8-9H2,1-4H3; Key:ZEYRDXUWJDGTLD-UHFFFAOYSA-N

2-Ethyl-5-methoxy-N,N-dimethyltryptamine (EMDT), also known as 2-ethyl-5-MeO-DMT, is a tryptamine derivative which is used in scientific research. It acts as a selective 5-HT_{6} receptor agonist, with a K_{i} of 16 nM, and was one of the first selective agonists developed for this receptor. Its affinities for many other targets have also been reported. EMDT inhibits both short- and long-term memory formation in animal studies, and this effect can be reversed by the selective 5-HT_{6} antagonist SB-399,885. Additionally, it is active in the tail suspension test, suggesting that it could be an effective antidepressant.

== See also ==
- Substituted tryptamine
- 2-Methyltryptamine
- BGC20-761
- EMD-386,088
- ST-1936
