= 4-Methoxytryptamine =

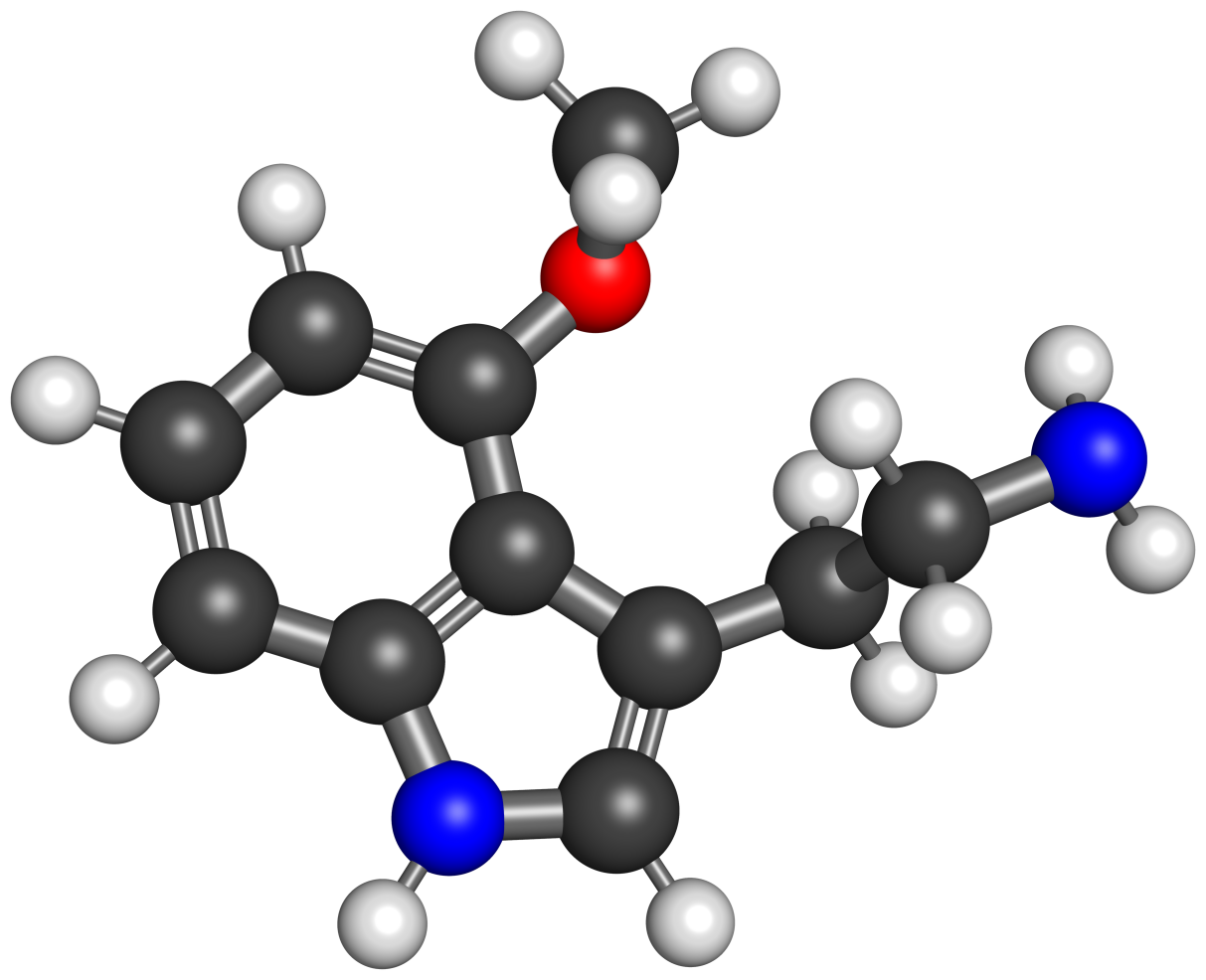

Clinical data
- Other names: 4-Methoxytryptamine; 4-Methoxy-T; 4-MeO-T; PAL-548; PAL548
- Drug class: Serotonin receptor modulator; Serotonin 5-HT_{2A} receptor agonist
- ATC code: None

Identifiers
- IUPAC name: 2-(4-methoxy-1H-indol-3-yl)ethanamine
- CAS Number: 3610-35-3
- PubChem CID: 19219
- ChemSpider: 18136
- ChEMBL: ChEMBL343529
- CompTox Dashboard (EPA): DTXSID70189679

Chemical and physical data
- Formula: C_{11}H_{14}N_{2}O
- Molar mass: 190.246 g·mol^{−1}
- 3D model (JSmol): Interactive image
- SMILES: COC1=CC=CC2=C1C(=CN2)CCN
- InChI: InChI=1S/C11H14N2O/c1-14-10-4-2-3-9-11(10)8(5-6-12)7-13-9/h2-4,7,13H,5-6,12H2,1H3; Key:WMBARRJMPVVQEZ-UHFFFAOYSA-N

4-Methoxytryptamine (4-MeO-T; developmental code name PAL-548) is a serotonin receptor modulator of the tryptamine and 4-hydroxytryptamine families. It is the O-methyl derivative of 4-hydroxytryptamine (4-HT) and a positional isomer of 5-methoxytryptamine and 6-methoxytryptamine.

== Pharmacology ==
The drug has been found to act as a potent serotonin 5-HT_{2A} receptor full agonist, with an EC_{50} of 9.02 nM and an E_{max} of 108%. It was inactive as a monoamine releasing agent, including of serotonin, norepinephrine, and dopamine, in rat brain synaptosomes (all EC_{50} = >10,000 nM), but was a very low-potency serotonin reuptake inhibitor (IC_{50} = 4,114 nM).

== History ==
4-Methoxytryptamine was first described in the scientific literature by at least 1962.

== See also ==
- Substituted tryptamine
- 4-Hydroxytryptamine
- 5-Methoxytryptamine
- 6-Methoxytryptamine
- 4-MeO-DMT
