= 2-Me-DET =

Chemical compound

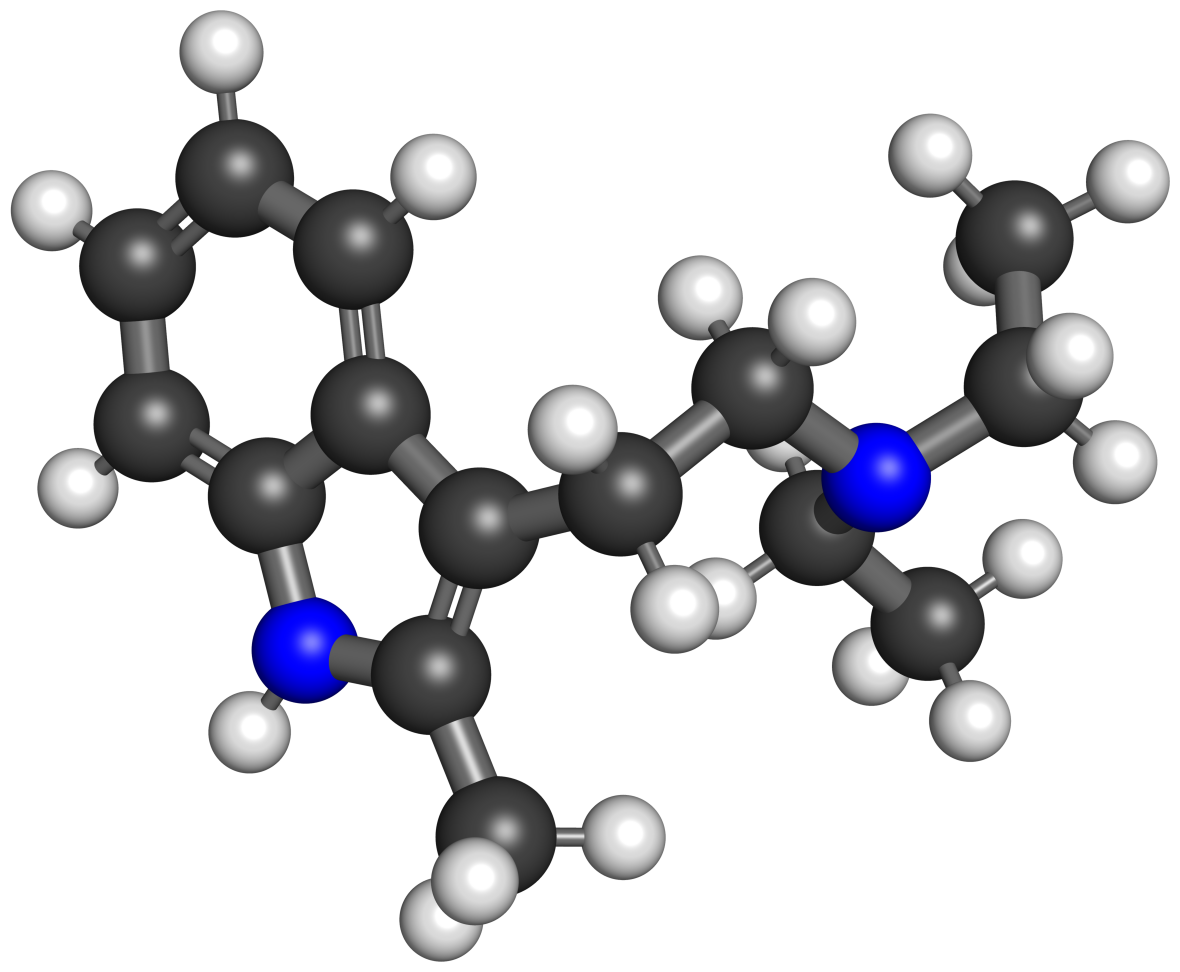

Clinical data
- Other names: 2-Methyl-DET; 2-Methyl-N,N-diethyltryptamine
- Routes of administration: Oral
- Drug class: Psychoactive drug; Serotonergic psychedelic; Hallucinogen
- ATC code: None

Pharmacokinetic data
- Duration of action: 6–8 hours

Identifiers
- IUPAC name: N,N-diethyl-2-(2-methyl-1H-indol-3-yl)ethanamine
- CAS Number: 26628-88-6
- PubChem CID: 33561
- ChemSpider: 30962
- UNII: SSF4F77CV3
- CompTox Dashboard (EPA): DTXSID30181174

Chemical and physical data
- Formula: C_{15}H_{22}N_{2}
- Molar mass: 230.355 g·mol^{−1}
- 3D model (JSmol): Interactive image
- SMILES: CCN(CC)CCc1c(C)[nH]c2ccccc12
- InChI: InChI=1S/C15H22N2/c1-4-17(5-2)11-10-13-12(3)16-15-9-7-6-8-14(13)15/h6-9,16H,4-5,10-11H2,1-3H3; Key:VVUATPWGKMGHGM-UHFFFAOYSA-N

2-Me-DET, or 2-methyl-DET, also known as 2-methyl-N,N-diethyltryptamine, is a psychedelic drug of the tryptamine family. It is the 2-methyl derivative of diethyltryptamine (DET). The drug is taken orally.

== Use and effects ==
In his book TiHKAL (Tryptamines I Have Known and Loved), Alexander Shulgin lists 2-Me-DET's dose as 80 to 120 mg orally and its duration as 6 to 8 hours. The effects of 2-Me-DET have been reported to include a vague unreal feeling, clouding and slowing of thoughts, DiPT-like sound distortion including higher pitches of music sounding muffled and tones shifting to a lower frequency, and stomach ache.

== Pharmacology ==
=== Pharmacodynamics ===
2-Me-DET is a serotonin receptor agonist in the rat uterus and stomach strip, with similar potency as dimethyltryptamine (DMT) and diethyltryptamine (DET) but profoundly greater potency than 2-methyl-DMT.

== Chemistry ==
=== Synthesis ===
The chemical synthesis of 2-Me-DET has been described.

=== Analogues ===
Analogues of 2-Me-DET include 2-methyltryptamine (2-MT; 2-Me-T), 2-methyl-DMT (2-Me-DMT; 2,N,N-TMT), 2-methyl-5-MeO-DMT (5-MeO-2,N,N-TMT), and 2-methyl-AMT (2-Me-AMT; 2,α-DMT).

== History ==
2-Me-DET was first described in the scientific literature by R. B. Barlow and I. Khan in 1959. Subsequently, it was described in greater detail by Alexander Shulgin in his 1997 book TiHKAL (Tryptamines I Have Known and Loved).

== See also ==
- Substituted tryptamine
