= TiHKAL =

1997 book by Alexander Shulgin and Ann Shulgin

TiHKAL: The Continuation
- Cover of TiHKAL, 1st ed.
- Author: Alexander and Ann Shulgin
- Subject: Pharmacology, Autobiography, Psychedelic drugs
- Publisher: Transform Press
- Publication date: 1997
- Publication place: United States
- Media type: Paperback
- Pages: xxviii, 804 p.
- ISBN: 0-9630096-9-9
- OCLC: 38503252
- Preceded by: PiHKAL (1991)

TiHKAL: The Continuation, also known as Tryptamines I Have Known and Loved, is a 1997 book written by Alexander Shulgin and Ann Shulgin. It is about a family of psychoactive drugs known as tryptamines, which includes psychedelics, other hallucinogens, and entactogens. The book has two halves, and the second part of the book contains detailed entries on 55 tryptamines. TiHKAL is a sequel to PiHKAL: A Chemical Love Story (Phenethylamines I Have Known and Loved) (1991).

== Content ==
TiHKAL, much like its predecessor PiHKAL, is divided into two parts. The first part, for which all rights are reserved, begins with a fictionalized autobiography, picking up where the similar section of PiHKAL left off; it then continues with a collection of essays on topics ranging from psychotherapy and the Jungian mind to the prevalence of DMT in nature, ayahuasca and the war on drugs.

The second part of TiHKAL, which may be conditionally distributed for non-commercial reproduction, is a detailed synthesis manual for 55 tryptamines (many discovered by Alexander Shulgin himself), including their chemical structures, doses, durations, and commentary. It includes entries on compounds including simple tryptamines like dimethyltryptamine (DMT), psilocin, and 5-MeO-DMT, α-alkyltryptamines like α-methyltryptamine (AMT), β-carbolines or harmala alkaloids like harmaline, the iboga alkaloid ibogaine, and lysergamides like LSD. Whereas PiHKAL had 179 entries on phenethylamines, TiHKAL has only 55 entries. Shulgin has made the second part freely available on Erowid while the first part is available only in the printed text.

Members of the Shulgin research group who contributed to the experience reports included Shulgin himself, Ann Shulgin, Myron Stolaroff, Jean Stolaroff, Darrell Lemaire, and Peyton Jacob III, among others.

Shulgin corresponded with the Temple of the True Inner Light, a psychedelic church based in New York City that was founded in 1980 and employed dipropyltryptamine (DPT) as its sacrament for decades, and wrote briefly but kindly about them in the chapter on DPT in TiHKAL.

== Response ==
As with PiHKAL, the Shulgins were motivated to release the synthesis information as a way to protect the public's access to information about psychedelic compounds, a goal Alexander Shulgin has noted many times. Following a raid of his laboratory in 1994 by the United States DEA, Richard Meyer, spokesman for DEA's San Francisco Field Division, stated that "It is our opinion that those books [referring to the previous work, PiHKAL] are pretty much cookbooks on how to make ‘controlled drugs’. Agents tell me that in clandestine labs that they have raided, they have found copies of those books."

== Notable compounds ==
Some compounds in TiHKAL, including dimethyltryptamine (DMT), psilocybin (4-PO-DMT), psilocin (4-HO-DMT), bufotenin (5-HO-DMT), 5-MeO-DMT, α-methyltryptamine (AMT), lysergic acid diethylamide (LSD), harmaline, and ibogaine, are widely known and/or used hallucinogens.

== Tryptamines listed ==
| # | Substance | Chemical name | Group | Dose^{a} | Duration | Link |
|---|---|---|---|---|---|---|
| 1 | AL-LAD (6-allyl-6-nor-LSD) | 6-Allyl-N,N-diethyl-NL | Lysergamide | 80–160 μg | 6–8 hours | |
| 2 | DBT (dibutyltryptamine) | N,N-Dibutyl-T | Tryptamine | Unknown | Unknown | |
| 3 | DET (diethyltryptamine) | N,N-Diethyl-T | Tryptamine | 50–100 mg | 2–4 hours | |
| 4 | DiPT (diisopropyltryptamine) | N,N-Diisopropyl-T | Tryptamine | 25–100 mg | 6–8 hours | |
| 5 | α,O-DMS (5-MeO-AMT) | 5-Methoxy-α-methyl-T | α-Alkyltryptamine | 2.5–4.5 mg | 12–18 hours | |
| 6 | DMT (dimethyltryptamine) | N,N-Dimethyl-T | Tryptamine | Various^{b} | Up to 1 hour | |
| 7 | 2,α-DMT (2-methyl-AMT) | 2,α-Dimethyl-T | α-Alkyltryptamine | 300–500 mg | 7–10 hours | |
| 8 | α,N-DMT (N-methyl-AMT) | α,N-Dimethyl-T | α-Alkyltryptamine | 50–100 mg | 6–8 hours | |
| 9 | DPT (dipropyltryptamine) | N,N-Dipropyl-T | Tryptamine | 100–250 mg | 2–4 hours | |
| 10 | EiPT (ethylisopropyltryptamine) | N-Ethyl-N-isopropyl-T | Tryptamine | 24–40 mg | 4–6 hours | |
| 11 | α-ET (AET; α-ethyltryptamine) | α-Ethyl-T | α-Alkyltryptamine | 100–150 mg | 6–8 hours | |
| 12 | ETH-LAD (6-ethyl-6-nor-LSD) | 6,N,N-Triethyl-NL | Lysergamide | 40–150 μg | 8–12 hours | |
| 13 | Harmaline (dihydroharmine) | 3,4-Dihydro-7-methoxy-1-methyl-BC | β-Carboline | 150–300 mg | 5–8 hours | |
| 14 | Harmine | 7-Methoxy-1-methyl-BC | β-Carboline | >300 mg | Unknown | |
| 15 | 4-HO-DBT | N,N-Dibutyl-4-hydroxy-T | 4-Hydroxytryptamine | >20 mg | Unknown | |
| 16 | 4-HO-DET | N,N-Diethyl-4-hydroxy-T | 4-Hydroxytryptamine | 10–25 mg | 4–6 hours | |
| 17 | 4-HO-DiPT | N,N-Diisopropyl-4-hydroxy-T | 4-Hydroxytryptamine | 15–20 mg | 2–3 hours | |
| 18 | 4-HO-DMT (psilocin) | N,N-Dimethyl-4-hydroxy-T | 4-Hydroxytryptamine | 10–20 mg | 3–6 hours | |
| 19 | 5-HO-DMT (bufotenin) | N,N-Dimethyl-5-hydroxy-T | 5-Hydroxytryptamine | 8–16 mg i.v. | 1–2 hours | |
| 20 | 4-HO-DPT | N,N-Dipropyl-4-hydroxy-T | 4-Hydroxytryptamine | Unknown | Unknown | |
| 21 | 4-HO-MET | N-Ethyl-4-hydroxy-N-methyl-T | 4-Hydroxytryptamine | 10–20 mg | 4–6 hours | |
| 22 | 4-HO-MiPT | 4-Hydroxy-N-isopropyl-N-methyl-T | 4-Hydroxytryptamine | 12–25 mg | 4–6 hours | |
| 23 | 4-HO-MPT | 4-Hydroxy-N-methyl-N-propyl-T | 4-Hydroxytryptamine | Unknown | Unknown | |
| 24 | 4-HO-pyr-T | 4-Hydroxy-N,N-tetramethylene-T | Pyrrolidinylethylindole | >20 mg | Unknown | |
| 25 | Ibogaine | A complexly substituted-T | Azepinoindole | Various^{c} | "Quite long" | |
| 26 | LSD (METH-LAD) | N,N-Diethyl-L | Lysergamide | 60–200 μg | 8–12 hours | |
| 27 | MBT (methylbutyltryptamine) | N-Butyl-N-methyl-T | Tryptamine | 250–400 mg | 4–6 hours | |
| 28 | 4,5-MDO-DiPT | N,N-Diisopropyl-4,5-methylenedioxy-T | Other | >25 mg | Unknown | |
| 29 | 5,6-MDO-DiPT | N,N-Diisopropyl-5,6-methylenedioxy-T | Other | Unknown | Unknown | |
| 30 | 4,5-MDO-DMT | N,N-Dimethyl-4,5-methylenedioxy-T | Other | Unknown | Unknown | |
| 31 | 5,6-MDO-DMT | N,N-Dimethyl-5,6-methylenedioxy-T | Other | >5 mg | Unknown | |
| 32 | 5,6-MDO-MiPT | N-Isopropyl-N-methyl-5,6-methylenedioxy-T | Other | >50 mg | Unknown | |
| 33 | 2-Me-DET (2-methyl-DET) | N,N-Diethyl-2-methyl-T | Other | 80–120 mg | 6–8 hours | |
| 34 | 2-Me-DMT (2-methyl-DMT) | 2,N,N-Trimethyl-T | Other | 50–100 mg | 4–6 hours | |
| 35 | Melatonin (5-MeO-NAcT) | N-Acetyl-5-methoxy-T | N-Acetyltryptamine | 1–10 mg | "A few hours" | |
| 36 | 5-MeO-DET | N,N-Diethyl-5-methoxy-T | 5-Methoxytryptamine | 1–3 mg | 3–4 hours | |
| 37 | 5-MeO-DiPT | N,N-Diisopropyl-5-methoxy-T | 5-Methoxytryptamine | 6–12 mg | 4–8 hours | |
| 38 | 5-MeO-DMT | 5-Methoxy-N,N-dimethyl-T | 5-Methoxytryptamine | Various^{d} | 1–2 hours | |
| 39 | 4-MeO-MiPT | N-Isopropyl-4-methoxy-N-methyl-T | Other | 20–30 mg | 4–6 hours | |
| 40 | 5-MeO-MiPT | N-Isopropyl-5-methoxy-N-methyl-T | 5-Methoxytryptamine | 4–6 mg^{e} | 4–6 hours | |
| 41 | 5,6-MeO-MiPT | 5,6-Dimethoxy-N-isopropyl-N-methyl-T | Other | >75 mg | Unknown | |
| 42 | 5-MeO-NMT | 5-Methoxy-N-methyl-T | 5-Methoxytryptamine | Unknown | Unknown | |
| 43 | 5-MeO-pyr-T | 5-Methoxy-N,N-tetramethylene-T | Pyrrolidinylethylindole | 0.5–2 mg | "Several hours" | |
| 44 | 6-MeO-THH | 6-Methoxy-1-methyl-1,2,3,4-tetrahydro-BC | β-Carboline | Unknown | Unknown | |
| 45 | 5-MeO-TMT | 5-Methoxy-2,N,N-trimethyl-T | Other | 75–150 mg | 5–10 hours | |
| 46 | 5-MeS-DMT | N,N-Dimethyl-5-methylthio-T | Other | 15–30 mg sm. | <1 hour | |
| 47 | MiPT (methylisopropyltryptamine) | N-Isopropyl-N-methyl-T | Tryptamine | 10–25 mg | 3–4 hours | |
| 48 | α-MT (AMT; α-methyltryptamine) | α-Methyl-T | α-Alkyltryptamine | 15–30 mg^{f} | 12–16 hours | |
| 49 | NET (N-ethyltryptamine) | N-Ethyl-T | Tryptamine | Unknown | Unknown | |
| 50 | NMT (N-methyltryptamine) | N-Methyl-T | Tryptamine | Unknown | Unknown | |
| 51 | PRO-LAD (6-propyl-6-nor-LSD) | 6-Propyl-NL | Lysergamide | 100–200 μg | 6–8 hours | |
| 52 | pyr-T (pyrrolidinyltryptamine) | N,N-Tetramethylene-T | Pyrrolidinylethylindole | Unknown | Unknown | |
| 53 | T (tryptamine) | Tryptamine | Tryptamine | 250 mg i.v. | "Very short" | |
| 54 | Tetrahydroharmine (THH) | 7-Methoxy-1-methyl-1,2,3,4-tetrahydro-BC | β-Carboline | 300 mg | Unknown | |
| 55 | α,N,O-TMS (5-MeO-α,N-DMT) | α,N-Dimethyl-5-methoxy-T | α-Alkyltryptamine | 10–20 mg | 6–8 hours | |
| 56 | 5-MeO-DALT^{g} | 5-Methoxy-N,N-diallyl-T | 5-Methoxytryptamine | 12–20 mg | 2–4 hours | |
| 57 | DALT (diallyltryptamine)^{g} | N,N-Diallyl-T | Tryptamine | >40 mg | Unknown | |
Acronyms (in chemical names): T = tryptamine; BC = β-carboline; L = lysergamide; NL = 6-norlysergamide. Footnotes: ^{a} = Dose and duration for compounds are orally unless otherwise specified. ^{b} = DMT doses are >350 mg orally, 60–100 mg intramuscularly, subcutaneously, or smoked, and 4–30 mg intravenously. ^{c} = Ibogaine dose is "from hundreds of [mg] up to [1 g] or more". ^{d} = 5-MeO-DMT doses are 6–20 mg smoked and 2–3 mg intravenously. ^{e} = 5-MeO-MiPT doses are 4–6 mg orally and 12–20 mg smoked. ^{f} = AMT doses are 15–30 mg orally and 5–20 mg smoked. ^{g} = The 5-MeO-DALT (#56) and DALT (#57) entries were not included in the published version of TiHKAL and were subsequently released in 2004.

In addition to TiHKAL, Shulgin has also described the properties of psychedelic tryptamines in humans in literature reviews.

== See also ==
- Bibliography of Alexander Shulgin
- PiHKAL (Phenethylamines I Have Known and Loved) (1991)
- The Shulgin Index, Volume One: Psychedelic Phenethylamines and Related Compounds (2011)
- List of psychedelic literature
- Substituted tryptamine
- Substituted β-carboline and harmala alkaloid
- Azepinoindole and iboga alkaloid
- Substituted lysergamide
