= Fluorodimethyltryptamine =

Fluorodimethyltryptamine (fluoro-DMT or F-DMT) may refer to:

- 4-Fluoro-N,N-dimethyltryptamine (4-fluoro-DMT; 4-F-DMT)
- 5-Fluoro-N,N-dimethyltryptamine (5-fluoro-DMT; 5-F-DMT)
- 6-Fluoro-N,N-dimethyltryptamine (6-fluoro-DMT; 6-F-DMT)

== See also ==
- Substituted tryptamine
- 5-Halo-DMT
- Bretisilocin (5-fluoro-MET)
- Fluorodiethyltryptamine (fluoro-DET)
- Fluoro-α-methyltryptamine
- 5-Fluorotryptamine
