= C12H15FN2 =

The molecular formula C_{12}H_{15}FN_{2} (molar mass: 206.259 g/mol, exact mass: 206.1219 u) may refer to:

- Flubatine
- 4-Fluoro-DMT (4-fluoro-N,N-dimethyltryptamine)
- 5-Fluoro-DMT (5-fluoro-N,N-dimethyltryptamine)
- 6-Fluoro-DMT (6-fluoro-N,N-dimethyltryptamine)
