= Hydroxydiethyltryptamine =

Hydroxydiethyltryptamine (hydroxy-DET or HO-DET) may refer to:

- 4-Hydroxy-N,N-diethyltryptamine (4-hydroxy-DET; 4-HO-DET; ethocin)
- 5-Hydroxy-N,N-diethyltryptamine (5-hydroxy-DET; 5-HO-DET)
- 6-Hydroxy-N,N-diethyltryptamine (6-hydroxy-DET; 6-HO-DET)

== See also ==
- Substituted tryptamine
- Methoxydiethyltryptamine (methoxy-DET)
- Hydroxydimethyltryptamine (hydroxy-DMT)
- Methoxydimethyltryptamine (methoxy-DMT)
- Fluorodiethyltryptamine (fluoro-DET)
