= 6-Hydroxy-DET =

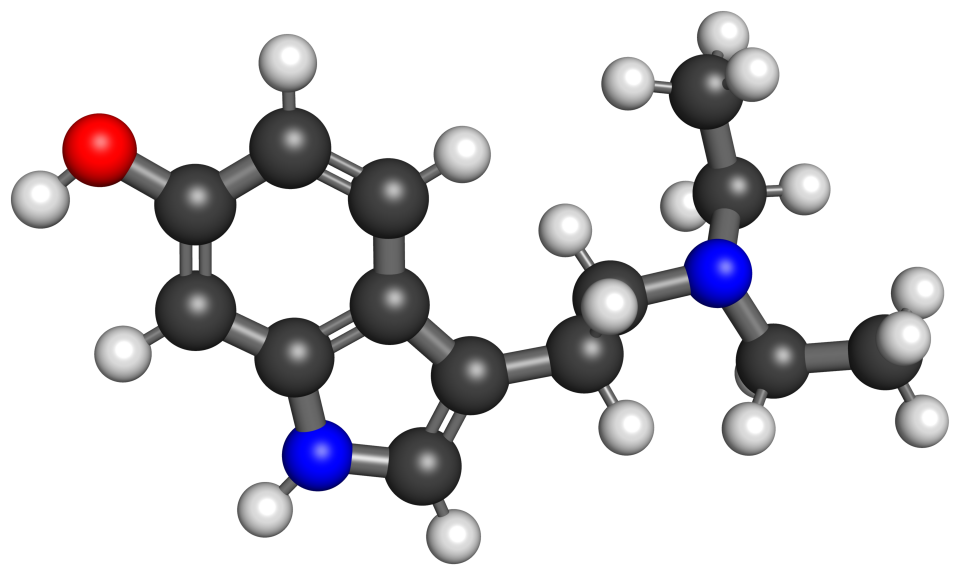

Clinical data
- Other names: 6-HO-DET; 6-OH-DET; 6-HDET; 6-Hydroxydiethyltryptamine; 6-Hydroxy-N,N-diethyltryptamine
- Routes of administration: Intramuscular injection
- Drug class: Serotonergic psychedelic; Hallucinogen
- ATC code: None

Pharmacokinetic data
- Onset of action: 1 hour
- Duration of action: 3–4 hours

Identifiers
- IUPAC name: 3-[2-(diethylamino)ethyl]-1H-indol-6-ol
- CAS Number: 1476-59-1
- PubChem CID: 124708066
- ChemSpider: 103872145

Chemical and physical data
- Formula: C_{14}H_{20}N_{2}O
- Molar mass: 232.327 g·mol^{−1}
- 3D model (JSmol): Interactive image
- SMILES: CCN(CC)CCC1=CNC2=C1C=CC(=C2)O
- InChI: InChI=1S/C14H20N2O/c1-3-16(4-2)8-7-11-10-15-14-9-12(17)5-6-13(11)14/h5-6,9-10,15,17H,3-4,7-8H2,1-2H3; Key:BOLBZNHQIHKGON-UHFFFAOYSA-N

6-Hydroxy-DET, or 6-HO-DET, also known as 6-hydroxy-N,N-diethyltryptamine, is a possible psychedelic drug of the tryptamine family related to dimethyltryptamine (DMT). It is the 6-hydroxy derivative of diethyltryptamine (DET). The drug is a notable metabolite of DET.

== Use and effects ==
According to Alexander Shulgin in his book TiHKAL (Tryptamines I Have Known and Loved), 6-HO-DET has been reported to be active at a dose of 10 mg by intramuscular injection. Lower doses of 1 to 2 mg were inactive, whereas 5 mg produced threshold effects. The drug at a dose of 10 mg was said to produce psychedelic effects very similar to those with 60 mg diethyltryptamine (DET), with these effects starting after 1 hour and lasting 2 to 3 hours. Based on this report, the drug would be about 5 to 6 times more potent than DET in humans. However, this report of 6-HO-DET's properties and effects is a second-hand early account in a single subject provided by Stephen Szara and colleagues and has not been replicated. Moreover, it is seemingly inconsistent with the inactivity of the closely related compounds 6-HO-DMT, 6-MeO-DMT, and 6-fluoro-DET. Relatedly, Shulgin wrote in TiHKAL that it is generally accepted that 6-HO-DET is inactive.

== Pharmacology ==
=== Pharmacodynamics ===
The effects of 6-HO-DET in animals have been studied. It was found to be much more potent than diethyltryptamine (DET) in terms of producing behavioral effects in rodents.

=== Pharmacokinetics ===
Alexander Shulgin has noted that 6-HO-DET may have poor blood–brain barrier permeability due to its exposed hydroxyl group and consequent polarity analogously to bufotenin (5-HO-DMT).

== Chemistry ==
=== Properties ===
The predicted log P of 6-HO-DET is 3.1. For comparison, the predicted log P of 6-HO-DMT is 2.4, of 4-HO-DET is 2.7, of 5-HO-DET is 1.9, and of bufotenin (5-HO-DMT) is 1.2.

=== Analogues ===
Analogues of 6-HO-DET include diethyltryptamine (DET), 6-hydroxytryptamine (6-HT or 6-HO-T), 6-HO-DMT, 6-MeO-DMT, 6-methyl-DMT, 6-fluoro-DET, psilocin (4-HO-DMT), 4-HO-DET, bufotenin (5-HO-DMT), 7-HO-DMT, 5-HO-DET, 5-HO-DPT, and 5-HO-DiPT, among others.

== History ==
6-HO-DET was first described in the scientific literature by Stephen Szara and colleagues by 1962. It was identified as a major active metabolite of diethyltryptamine (DET). In addition, they found that excretion of 6-HO-DET with DET administration correlated with DET's hallucinogenic effects and that 6-HO-DET was much more potent than DET in humans based on preliminary observations. Consequently, Szara and colleagues theorized that 6-hydroxylation of psychedelic tryptamines like dimethyltryptamine (DMT), DET, and α-methyltryptamine (AMT) was importantly involved in their hallucinogenic effects. However, this hypothesis was later found to be incorrect and was abandoned.

== See also ==
- Substituted tryptamine
