= Fluorotryptamine =

Fluorotryptamine may refer to:

- 4-Fluorotryptamine
- 5-Fluorotryptamine
- 6-Fluorotryptamine
- 7-Fluorotryptamine

== See also ==
- Chlorotryptamine
- Bromotryptamine
