= Bromotryptamine =

Bromotryptamine may refer to:

- 4-Bromotryptamine
- 5-Bromotryptamine
- 6-Bromotryptamine
- 7-Bromotryptamine

== See also ==
- Fluorotryptamine
- Chlorotryptamine
