= Methoxydiethyltryptamine =

Methoxydiethyltryptamine (methoxy-DET, MeO-DET, or OMe-DET) may refer to:

- 4-Methoxy-DET (4-MeO-DET)
- 5-Methoxy-DET (5-MeO-DET)

== See also ==
- Substituted tryptamine
- Hydroxydiethyltryptamine (hydroxy-DET)
- Methoxydimethyltryptamine (methoxy-DMT)
- Hydroxydimethyltryptamine (hydroxy-DMT)
- Fluorodiethyltryptamine (fluoro-DET)
