= Fluoro-α-methyltryptamine =

Fluoro-α-methyltryptamine (fluoro-AMT or F-AMT) may refer to:

- 5-Fluoro-α-methyltryptamine (5-fluoro-AMT; 5-F-AMT)
- 6-Fluoro-α-methyltryptamine (6-fluoro-AMT; 6-F-AMT)

== See also ==
- Substituted tryptamine
- 5-Chloro-AMT
- 5-Fluoro-AET
- 5-Chloro-AET
- 5-Halo-DMT
- Fluorodimethyltryptamine (fluoro-DMT)
- Fluorodiethyltryptamine (fluoro-DET)
