= C13H15F3N2O =

The molecular formula C_{13}H_{15}F_{3}N_{2}O (molar mass: 272.271 g/mol) may refer to:

- 5-TFMO-DMT
- 6-TFMO-DMT
