= 5-Bromotryptamine =

Clinical data
- Other names: 5-Bromo-T; 5-Br-T; PAL-518; PAL518
- Drug class: Serotonin receptor modulator; Serotonin 5-HT_{2A} receptor agonist; Serotonin–dopamine releasing agent
- ATC code: None

Identifiers
- IUPAC name: 2-(5-bromo-1H-indol-3-yl)ethanamine
- CAS Number: 3610-42-2
- PubChem CID: 77158
- ChemSpider: 69595
- ChEMBL: ChEMBL1288717
- CompTox Dashboard (EPA): DTXSID40957504

Chemical and physical data
- Formula: C_{10}H_{11}BrN_{2}
- Molar mass: 239.116 g·mol^{−1}
- 3D model (JSmol): Interactive image
- SMILES: C1=CC2=C(C=C1Br)C(=CN2)CCN
- InChI: InChI=1S/C10H11BrN2/c11-8-1-2-10-9(5-8)7(3-4-12)6-13-10/h1-2,5-6,13H,3-4,12H2; Key:CGHUQJRRADEHTQ-UHFFFAOYSA-N

5-Bromotryptamine (5-Br-T; developmental code name PAL-518) is a serotonin receptor modulator and monoamine releasing agent of the tryptamine family. It is the 5-bromo derivative of tryptamine.

The drug acts as a potent full agonist of the serotonin 5-HT_{2A} receptor, with an EC_{50} of 5.14 nM and an E_{max} of 108%. It is also a potent full agonist of the serotonin 5-HT_{2B} receptor. In addition to its serotonin receptor agonism, 5-bromotryptamine is a serotonin–dopamine releasing agent (SDRA), with EC_{50} values for induction of monoamine release of 75 nM for serotonin, 478 nM for dopamine, and >10,000 nM for norepinephrine in rat brain synaptosomes.

Tryptamines without substitutions at the amine or alpha carbon, such as tryptamine, serotonin (5-hydroxytryptamine; 5-HT), and 5-methoxytryptamine (5-MeO-T), are known to be very rapidly metabolized and thereby inactivated by monoamine oxidase A (MAO-A) in vivo and to have very short elimination half-lives. However, given intravenously at sufficiently high doses, tryptamine is still known to be able to produce weak and short-lived psychoactive effects in humans.

The chemical synthesis of 5-bromotryptamine has been described.

5-Bromotryptamine was first described in the scientific literature by 1965.

== See also ==
- Substituted tryptamine
- 5,6-Dibromotryptamine
- 6-Bromotryptamine
- 5-Bromo-DMT
- 5,6-Dibromo-DMT
- BK-5Br-NM-AMT
- 5-Chlorotryptamine
- 5-Fluorotryptamine
