= 6-Fluorotryptamine =

Clinical data
- Other names: 6-Fluorotryptamine; 6-FT; 6-Fluoro-T; PAL-227; PAL227
- Drug class: Serotonin receptor agonist; Monoamine releasing agent; Monoamine oxidase inhibitor

Identifiers
- IUPAC name: 2-(6-fluoro-1H-indol-3-yl)ethanamine
- CAS Number: 575-85-9
- PubChem CID: 854024
- ChemSpider: 746410
- ChEMBL: ChEMBL381160
- CompTox Dashboard (EPA): DTXSID60357527
- ECHA InfoCard: 100.215.037

Chemical and physical data
- Formula: C_{10}H_{11}FN_{2}
- Molar mass: 178.210 g·mol^{−1}
- 3D model (JSmol): Interactive image
- SMILES: C1=CC2=C(C=C1F)NC=C2CCN
- InChI: InChI=1S/C10H11FN2/c11-8-1-2-9-7(3-4-12)6-13-10(9)5-8/h1-2,5-6,13H,3-4,12H2; Key:BQTOKMYKZPCPRW-UHFFFAOYSA-N

6-Fluorotryptamine (6-FT or 6-fluoro-T; code name PAL-227) is a serotonin receptor agonist and monoamine releasing agent (MRA) of the tryptamine family.

== Pharmacology ==
6-FT is known to have affinity for the serotonin 5-HT_{1A} and 5-HT_{2A} receptors, with K_{i} values of 267 nM and 606 nM, respectively. The drug is known to act as a full agonist of the serotonin 5-HT_{2A} receptor, with an EC_{50} of 4.56 nM and an E_{max} of 101%. Another study found EC_{50} values of 54 nM at the serotonin 5-HT_{1A} receptor and 81 nM at the serotonin 5-HT_{2A} receptor.

As an MRA, 6-FT is specifically a selective serotonin releasing agent (SRA). It is one of the most potent SRAs known in vitro, with an EC_{50} of 4.4 nM in rat brain synaptosomes. It was more potent as an SRA than any other tryptamine in large series of compounds, and was second in potency of the assessed compounds only to the phenethylamine derivative naphthylaminopropane (NAP; PAL-287). 6-FT also much more weakly induces the release of dopamine and norepinephrine, with EC_{50} values of 106 nM (24-fold lower than serotonin) and 1,575 nM (358-fold lower than serotonin), respectively.

Besides its serotonin receptor agonism and monoamine release induction, 6-FT is a somewhat potent monoamine oxidase inhibitor (MAOI), with IC_{50} values of 1,580 nM for monoamine oxidase A (MAO-A) and 5,620 nM for monoamine oxidase B (MAO-B).

In contrast to analogues like 6-fluoro-AMT and 6-fluoro-DMT as well as many other tryptamines, 6-FT fails to induce the head-twitch response, a behavioral proxy of psychedelic effects, in rodents.

Tryptamines without substitutions at the amine or alpha carbon, such as tryptamine, serotonin (5-hydroxytryptamine; 5-HT), and 5-methoxytryptamine (5-MeO-T), are known to be very rapidly metabolized and thereby inactivated by monoamine oxidase A (MAO-A) in vivo and to have very short elimination half-lives. However, given intravenously at sufficiently high doses, tryptamine is still known to be able to produce weak and short-lived psychoactive effects in humans.

== History ==
6-FT was first described in the scientific literature by 1995.

== See also ==
- 5-Fluorotryptamine
- 5-Methoxytryptamine
- 5-Methyltryptamine
- 6-Fluoro-AMT
- 6-Fluoro-DET
- 6-Fluoro-DMT
- 6-MeO-DMT
- 7-Chlorotryptamine
