= Fluorodiethyltryptamine =

Fluorodiethyltryptamine (fluoro-DET or F-DET) may refer to:

- 5-Fluoro-N,N-diethyltryptamine (5-fluoro-DET; 5-F-DET)
- 6-Fluoro-N,N-diethyltryptamine (6-fluoro-DET; 6-F-DET)

== See also ==
- Substituted tryptamine
- Fluorodimethyltryptamine (fluoro-DMT)
- 5-Halo-DMT
- Bretisilocin (5-fluoro-MET)
- Fluoro-α-methyltryptamine
- 5-Fluorotryptamine
