= 5,6-Dibromo-DMT =

Chemical compound

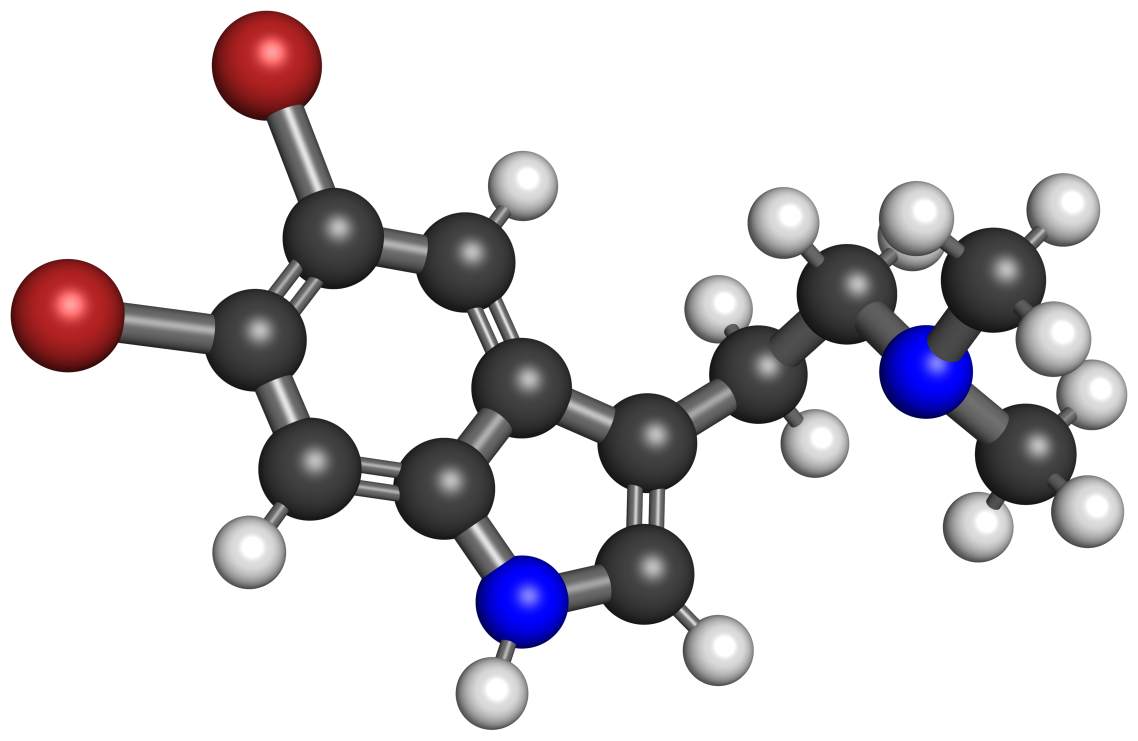

Clinical data
- Other names: 5,6-Dibromodimethyltryptamine; 1H-Indole-3-ethanamine, 5,6-dibromo-N,N-dimethyl-; NSC-622271

Identifiers
- IUPAC name: 2-(5,6-dibromo-1H-indol-3-yl)-N,N-dimethylethanamine
- CAS Number: 72853-80-6
- PubChem CID: 360251
- ChemSpider: 319811
- UNII: QTA0HT8VX3
- ChEMBL: ChEMBL256339

Chemical and physical data
- Formula: C_{12}H_{14}Br_{2}N_{2}
- Molar mass: 346.066 g·mol^{−1}
- 3D model (JSmol): Interactive image
- SMILES: CN(C)CCC1=CNC2=CC(=C(C=C21)Br)Br
- InChI: InChI=1S/C12H14Br2N2/c1-16(2)4-3-8-7-15-12-6-11(14)10(13)5-9(8)12/h5-7,15H,3-4H2,1-2H3; Key:FQUXASLSQLXGHJ-UHFFFAOYSA-N

5,6-Dibromo-DMT (5,6-Dibromo-N,N-dimethyltryptamine, 5,6-Br-DMT) is a substituted tryptamine alkaloid found in some marine sponges. It is briefly mentioned in Alexander Shulgin's book TiHKAL (Tryptamines I Have Known and Loved) under the DMT entry and is stated to be found, along with other tryptamines, in Smenospongia aurea and other sponges.

== See also ==
- Substituted tryptamine
- 5,6-Dibromo-N-methyltryptamine
- 6-Bromotryptamine
- 5-Bromo-DMT
