= Chlorotryptamine =

Chlorotryptamine may refer to:

- 4-Chlorotryptamine
- 5-Chlorotryptamine
- 6-Chlorotryptamine
- 7-Chlorotryptamine

== See also ==
- Fluorotryptamine
- Bromotryptamine
