= 5-TFM-DMT =

Chemical compound

5-(Trifluoromethyl)-DMT

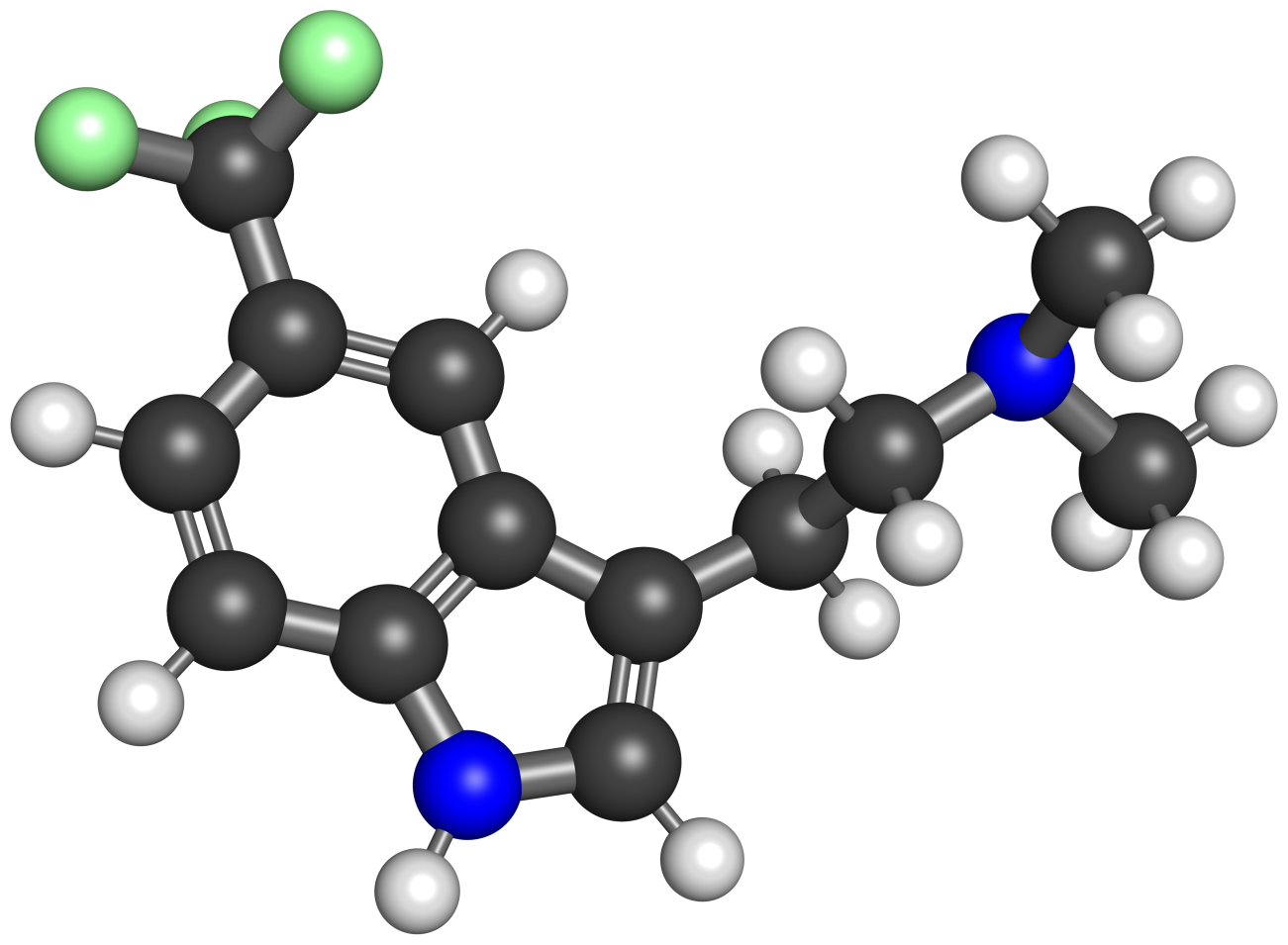

Clinical data
- Other names: 5-TFM-DMT

Identifiers
- IUPAC name: N,N-dimethyl-5-(trifluoromethyl)-1H-Indole-3-ethanamine
- CAS Number: 2418713-31-0
- PubChem CID: 154577546

Chemical and physical data
- Formula: C_{13}H_{15}F_{3}N_{2}
- Molar mass: 256.272 g·mol^{−1}
- 3D model (JSmol): Interactive image
- SMILES: CN(C)CCC1=CNC2=CC=C(C(F)(F)F)C=C21
- InChI: InChI=1S/C13H15F3N2/c1-18(2)6-5-9-8-17-12-4-3-10(7-11(9)12)13(14,15)16/h3-4,7-8,17H,5-6H2,1-2H3; Key:VOLQGCCSWTZFGQ-UHFFFAOYSA-N

5-TFM-DMT (5-(trifluoromethyl)-DMT, 5-CF3-DMT, 5-(trifluoromethyl)-N,N-dimethyltryptamine) is a putative psychedelic tryptamine derivative related to drugs such as 5-MeO-DMT, 5-Fluoro-DMT, and 5-TFMO-DMT. It acts as a partial agonist at the 5-HT_{2A} receptor, with an EC_{50} of 185.7 nM and an efficacy of 28.7% (vs 5-HT), and a full agonist at 5-HT_{2C} with an EC_{50} of 89.7 nM and an efficacy of 88.8%, and no significant activity at 5-HT_{2B}.

== See also ==
- Substituted tryptamine
- 5-MeO-DMT
- 5-Bromo-DMT
- 5-Chloro-DMT
- 5-Fluoro-DMT
- 5-Nitro-DMT
- 5-TFMO-DMT
