= 5-Nitro-DMT =

Chemical compound

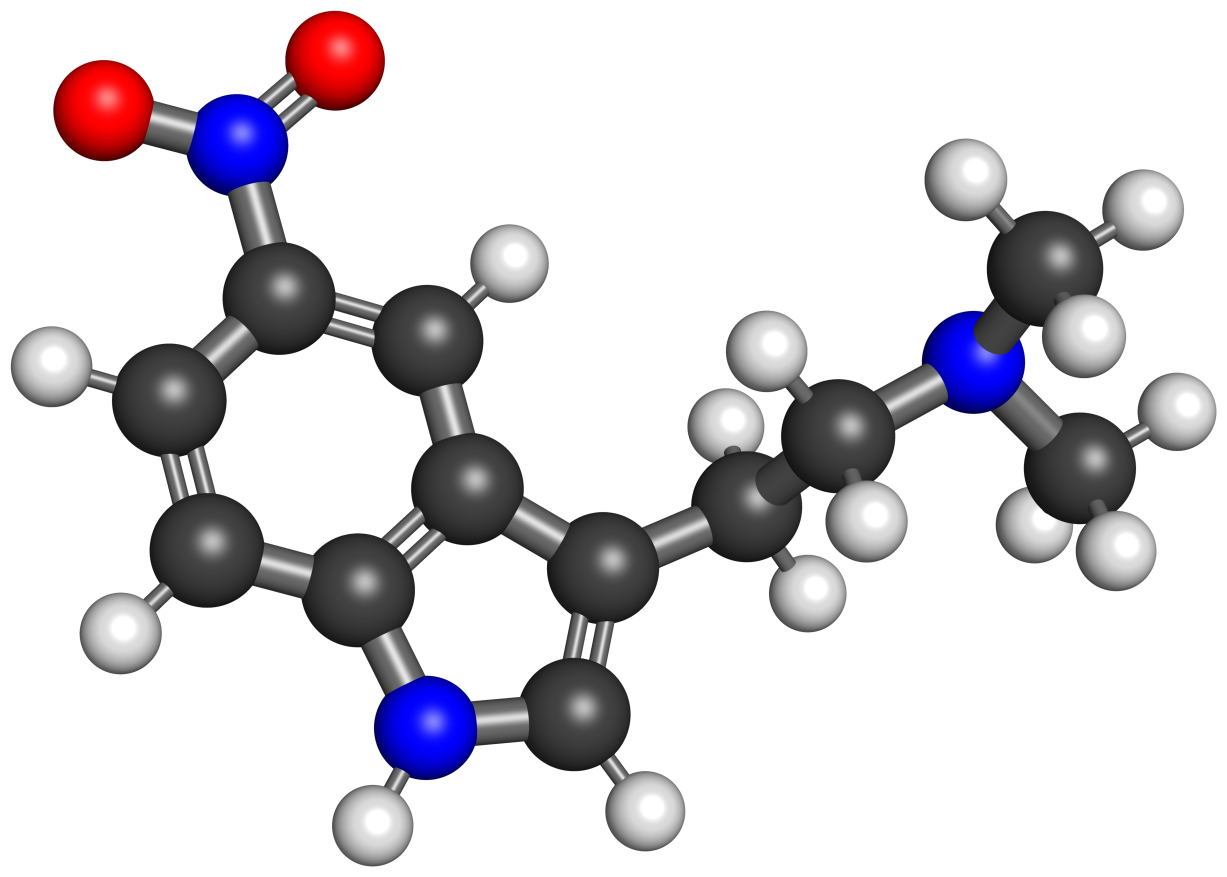

Identifiers
- IUPAC name: N,N-dimethyl-2-(5-nitro-1H-indol-3-yl)ethanamine
- CAS Number: 69937-13-9
- PubChem CID: 949965
- ChemSpider: 825756
- CompTox Dashboard (EPA): DTXSID40359185

Chemical and physical data
- Formula: C_{12}H_{15}N_{3}O_{2}
- Molar mass: 233.271 g·mol^{−1}
- 3D model (JSmol): Interactive image
- SMILES: CN(C)CCC1=CNC2=C1C=C(C=C2)[N+](=O)[O-]
- InChI: InChI=1S/C12H15N3O2/c1-14(2)6-5-9-8-13-12-4-3-10(15(16)17)7-11(9)12/h3-4,7-8,13H,5-6H2,1-2H3; Key:WNAXXOOIDCPHIB-UHFFFAOYSA-N

5-Nitro-DMT (5-nitro-N,N-dimethyltryptamine) is a substituted tryptamine derivative which acts as a serotonin receptor agonist, though its subtype selectivity has not been studied with modern techniques.

== See also ==
- Substituted tryptamine
- 5-Bromo-DMT
- 5-MeO-DMT
- 5-Nitrotryptamine
- 5-TFM-DMT
- 5-TFMO-DMT
