= Hydroxydimethyltryptamine =

Hydroxydimethyltryptamine (hydroxy-DMT or HO-DMT) may refer to:

- 4-Hydroxy-N,N-dimethyltryptamine (4-hydroxy-DMT; 4-HO-DMT; psilocin)
- 5-Hydroxy-N,N-dimethyltryptamine (5-hydroxy-DMT; 5-HO-DMT; bufotenin)
- 6-Hydroxy-N,N-dimethyltryptamine (6-hydroxy-DMT; 6-HO-DMT)
- 7-Hydroxy-N,N-dimethyltryptamine (7-hydroxy-DMT; 7-HO-DMT)

== See also ==
- Substituted tryptamine
- Methoxydimethyltryptamine (methoxy-DMT)
- Hydroxydiethyltryptamine (hydroxy-DET)
