= Diethyltryptamine =

Psychedelic drug

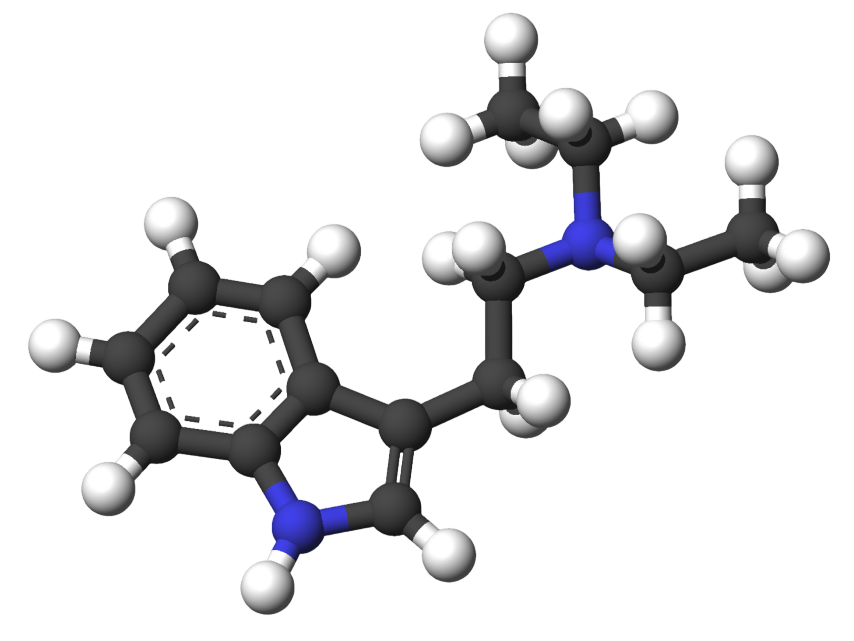

Clinical data
- Other names: DET; N,N-Diethyltryptamine; N,N-DET; T-9; T9
- Routes of administration: Oral, inhalation (smoking), intramuscular, intravenous, subcutaneous
- Drug class: Non-selective serotonin receptor agonist; Serotonin 5-HT_{2A} receptor agonist; Serotonergic psychedelic; Hallucinogen
- ATC code: None

Legal status
- Legal status: BR: Class F2 (Prohibited psychotropics); CA: Schedule III; DE: Anlage I (Authorized scientific use only); UK: Class A; US: Schedule I; UN: Psychotropic Schedule I

Pharmacokinetic data
- Metabolism: Oxidative deamination (MAO-A), N-oxidation, N-dealkylation
- Metabolites: Indole-3-acetic acid (12–17% in urine); 6-HO-DET (3–4% in urine)
- Onset of action: Oral: 40–60 min; Smoked: A few seconds to minutes; Intramuscular: 15 min
- Duration of action: 2–4 hours
- Excretion: urine

Identifiers
- IUPAC name: N,N-diethyl-2-(1H-indol-3-yl)ethan-2-amine
- CAS Number: 61-51-8
- PubChem CID: 6090
- DrugBank: DB01460
- ChemSpider: 5865
- UNII: 916E8V4S2V
- KEGG: C22726
- ChEBI: CHEBI:184081
- ChEMBL: ChEMBL142936
- CompTox Dashboard (EPA): DTXSID9052763

Chemical and physical data
- Formula: C_{14}H_{20}N_{2}
- Molar mass: 216.328 g·mol^{−1}
- 3D model (JSmol): Interactive image
- Melting point: 169 to 171 °C (336 to 340 °F)
- SMILES: CCN(CC)CCC1=CNC2=C1C=CC=C2
- InChI: InChI=1S/C14H20N2/c1-3-16(4-2)10-9-12-11-15-14-8-6-5-7-13(12)14/h5-8,11,15H,3-4,9-10H2,1-2H3; Key:LSSUMOWDTKZHHT-UHFFFAOYSA-N

Diethyltryptamine (DET), also known as N,N-diethyltryptamine or T-9, is a psychedelic drug of the tryptamine family closely related to dimethyltryptamine (DMT). It is taken orally, but can also be used by non-oral routes, such as smoking and injection. The drug is relatively short-acting. Compared to DMT, it is said to have fewer visual effects and to be more functional and clearheaded.

The drug acts as a non-selective serotonin receptor agonist, including of the serotonin 5-HT_{2A} receptor among others. It has not been found to occur endogenously. DET is a close structural homologue of DMT and dipropyltryptamine (DPT). Other analogues of DET include 4-HO-DET (ethocin), ethocybin (4-PO-DET), and 5-MeO-DET.

DET was first synthesized in 1956 by Stephen Szára and subsequently described in material published in 1957. More systematic studies were reported later by Szára and colleagues and independently by Z. Böszörményi and colleagues. Experiences with DET played an important role in the development of the religious beliefs of the Temple of the True Inner Light in the 1970s. The drug has been a Schedule I controlled substance in the United States since 1970.

== Use and effects ==
According to Alexander Shulgin in his book TiHKAL (Tryptamines I Have Known and Loved), DET's dose range is 50 to 100 mg orally and its duration is 2 to 4 hours. It was also assessed at oral doses of 44 to 400 mg, though 150 mg was described as "a little too much" and the 400 mg dose was simply described as "too high". Its onset is 40 minutes to more than 1 hour and peak effects occurred at just over 1 hour. In addition to oral administration, DET was assessed by smoking at doses of 40 to 90 mg, by subcutaneous injection at a dose of 40 mg, by intramuscular injection at a dose of 60 mg, and by intravenous injection at a dose of 60 mg. By these routes, it has a faster onset than when taken orally. The drug is said to taste terrible when smoked, like "burning plastic". DET was initially assumed to be inactive orally similarly to dimethyltryptamine (DMT), but this proved to be incorrect.

The effects of DET have been reported to include similar "illusions" and hallucinations" as DMT, a wave-like time course of effects, closed-eye visuals, open-eye visuals, auditory and olfactory hallucinations, synesthesia, feeling like in another world, cosmic thinking, mystical and philosophical feelings, dream-like mysteriousness of objects, greater emotional significance of objects, peoples' faces seeming "mask-like", enhanced appreciation of art, architecture, and music, feeling like a small child perceiving the world and discovering it anew, time dilation, enjoyment and euphoria, increased empathy, and emotional insights. Additional effects included feeling stoned, alcohol-like intoxication, drifting of thoughts, and difficulty concentrating and cognitive impairment. The effects of the drug were described as highly dependent on set and setting, with prominent negative reactions in unfavorable environments or with too high of doses, including unpleasantness, anxiety, paranoia, social withdrawal, and unwillingness to take the drug again, among others. Physical effects of DET included DMT-like vegetative or autonomic symptoms, pupil dilation, sweating, slight burning and numbness of hands and feet, dizziness, vertigo, feeling sick, paleness, shakiness, muscle tremors, athetoid movements, vomiting, feeling of hollowness in the chest, pronounced tachycardia, pressor effects, and other somatic symptoms. Subsequent-day effects included an afterglow, hangover, lassitude, and cognitive fuzziness.

In other reports, DET is said to be longer-lasting than DMT when smoked, but to lack DMT's pronounced visual effects and impact, for instance having little in the way of hallucinations and visual distortion. Nonetheless, it is said to produce intense and pleasurable states of mind, albeit more subtle, less intense, and more functional and clearheaded compared to DMT. The drug is said to have a duration of 1 hour when smoked and 3 hours when injected. The onset when smoked is said to be a few seconds to a few minutes. The experience when smoked can be built on and extended with repeated inhalations. Some users have described religious feelings and experiences while on DET. The drug can be advantageous over long-acting psychedelics like LSD or mescaline due to its much shorter and more manageable duration. Like other psychedelics, DET is reported to produce antidepressant-like effects after the experience, such as increased interest in hobbies like art and writing, as well as increased creativity.

== Pharmacology ==
=== Pharmacodynamics ===
DET activities
Target	Affinity (K_{i}, nM)
5-HT_{1A}	370 (K_{i}); 138 (EC_{50}); 98% (E_{max})
5-HT_{2A}	530 (K_{i}); 68–612^{a} (EC_{50}); 46^{a}–90% (E_{max})
5-HT_{2C}	970 (K_{i}); 660^{a} (EC_{50}); 106%^{a} (E_{max})
SERT	1,200 (K_{i}); 254–258 (IC_{50})
NET	>10,000 (IC_{50})
DAT	>10,000 (IC_{50})
Notes: The smaller the value, the more avidly drug interacts with the site. Footnotes: ^{a} = Stimulation of IP_{1} formation. Sources:

Similarly to other classic psychedelics, DET acts as a non-selective serotonin receptor agonist, including of the serotonin 5-HT_{2A}, 5-HT_{2B}, and 5-HT_{2C} receptors. The drug has been shown to activate G_{q}-mediated signaling at the serotonin 5-HT_{2A} receptor with E_{max} higher than 70% and to produce the head-twitch response in rodents which is a behavioral proxy of psychedelic-like effects. It is also a serotonin receptor agonist in the rat uterus and stomach strip, with slightly greater potency than dimethyltryptamine (DMT).

DET is a very weak reversible monoamine oxidase inhibitor (MAOI), with IC_{50} values of 59 μM for serotonin and 5,000 μM for tryptamine as substrates. Injections of 30 mg/kg to rats resulted in 67% reduction of brain MAO-A activity 15 minutes after administration. The substance may also act as a serotonin reuptake inhibitor, with low affinity but moderate potency. It shows no activity as a norepinephrine or dopamine reuptake inhibitor.

=== Pharmacokinetics ===
DET demonstrates significant resistance to metabolism by monoamine oxidase A (MAO-A) compared to DMT. This may be due to the increased steric bulk of the N-ethyl substituents relative to the respective methyl groups of DMT which results in metabolic stability sufficient for oral activity. This is also true for many other tryptamines with larger nitrogen substituents.

The drug similarly to DMT is rapidly absorbed from the intraperitoneal cavity and quickly distributed through plasma, liver and brain. Most of the substance had disappeared from the aforementioned tissues 30 minutes from administration, except in the brain, where it could still be detected at 60 minutes.

Likewise to DMT the substance is metabolized through 6-hydroxylation and N-dealkylation to form the corresponding intermediates. These metabolites were found to be excreted in urine of about 20% of the administered dose as the glucoronide conjugate, of which the parent compound can be detected by chromatographic analysis at low concentrations (3–5%). Hepatic 6-hydroxylation of the indole ring, yields a minor, psychoactively inactive metabolite 6-hydroxy-DET (6-HO-DET) in similar concentration, with additional hydroxylation possible at alternative positions. Repeated administration of DET, or second exposure one to two weeks after the first, resulted in significant metabolic changes. The unchanged drug excreted after a later exposure was significantly lower, while the excretion of the metabolites which were measured in this case were higher than at the first exposure to DET.

== Chemistry ==
DET, also known as N,N-diethyltryptamine, is a synthetic compound in the tryptamine class, structurally related to the endogenous neurotransmitter serotonin and the naturally occurring psychedelic compounds dimethyltryptamine (DMT) and dipropyltryptamine (DPT). It is the ethyl analogue of DMT.

=== Synthesis ===
The chemical synthesis of DET has been described. Its synthesis is fairly simple.

=== Analogues ===
Analogues of DET include dimethyltryptamine (DMT), dipropyltryptamine (DPT), methylethyltryptamine (MET), methylpropyltryptamine (MPT), ethylpropyltryptamine (EPT), 4-HO-DET, 5-HO-DET, 6-HO-DET, 4-AcO-DET, ethocybin (4-PO-DET or CEY-19), 6F-DET, and 2-Me-DET.

== History ==
DET was first synthesized and administered intramuscularly in a 60 mg dose by Stephen Szára in 1956. It was subsequently described in his material published in 1957. More systematic studies were reported later by Szára and colleagues and independently by Z. Böszörményi and colleagues. Early research began as a search for "psychosis mimics" in psychiatry, then expanded into broader psychedelic and structure–activity studies. Selection of study subjects for some of these studies was criticized by Alexander Shulgin in his 1997 book TiHKAL (Tryptamines I Have Known and Loved) for its "oppressive research environment". For many years, based on early clinical reports and private communications, Shulgin maintained that DET exhibited psychoactive effects only when administered via parenteral routes. He eventually revised his view, ultimately acknowledging that the substance is also orally active.

Initially, DET was not classified as a controlled substance, and some early clinical and experimental psychopharmacological research used it without scheduling restrictions. By the late 1960s and early 1970s, however, increasing regulatory attention led to tighter controls and this led to DET getting placed in Schedule I internationally by the Convention on Psychotropic Substances.

Modern research on DET remains limited compared to dimethyltryptamine (DMT), due to its status as a controlled substance and the predominance of focus on other tryptamines with greater prevalence in traditional or clinical contexts. Most recent studies and reviews refer to DET primarily in comparative molecular pharmacology, assessing its receptor binding and signaling at serotonin receptors.

== Society and culture ==
=== Religious use ===
Use of DET by Alan Birnbaum played an important role in the development and beliefs of his psychedelic church The Temple of the True Inner Light, which subsequently employed the unscheduled and hence dipropyltryptamine (DPT) as well as other psychedelics as sacraments.

=== Legal status ===
==== International ====
DET is listed under Schedule I of the United Nations 1971 Convention on Psychotropic Substances, placing it under international control. This means that countries that are parties to the Convention are required to regulate DET production, distribution, and use, restricting it to scientific and very limited medical purposes. Possession and trade of DET without appropriate authorization is prohibited under international law.

==== Australia ====
DET is considered a Schedule 9 prohibited substance in Australia under the Poisons Standard (October 2015). A Schedule 9 substance is a substance which may be abused or misused, the manufacture, possession, sale or use of which should be prohibited by law except when required for medical or scientific research, or for analytical, teaching or training purposes with approval of Commonwealth and/or State or Territory Health Authorities.

==== Canada ====
DET is a Schedule III controlled substance in Canada.

==== Germany ====
DET is controlled in Germany under Anlage I BtMG (Narcotics Act, Schedule I). as of January 24, 1974. It is illegal to manufacture, possess, import, export, buy, sell, procure or dispense it without a license.

==== Italy ====
DET is a Schedule I controlled substance in Italy.

==== New Zealand ====
DET is a Class A controlled substance in New Zealand.

==== Switzerland ====
DET is a controlled substance in Switzerland specifically named under Verzeichnis D.

==== United Kingdom ====
DET is a Class A controlled substance in the United Kingdom.

==== United States ====
DET is a Schedule I controlled substance in the United States.

== Research ==
=== Psychosis model ===
Early studies of DET as well as other psychedelics were focused on their presumed psychotomimetic properties. Researchers theorized that abnormal metabolites of endogenous chemicals such as tryptamine, serotonin, and tryptophan could be the explanation for mental disorders such as schizophrenia, or psychosis. DET, along with other synthetic psychedelics, was administered to both patients and healthy volunteers to understand its effects and as a possible biological model for psychosis. With the progression of science and pharmacological understanding, this belief has been dismissed by most researchers.

=== Mushroom production ===
Although DET is a synthetic compound with no known natural sources, it has been used in conjunction with the mycelium of Psilocybe cubensis to biosynthetically produce the chemicals ethocybin (4-PO-DET) and ethocin (4-HO-DET). Isolation of the alkaloids resulted in 3.3% ethocybin and 0.01 to 0.8% ethocin. The findings were reported by Jochen Gartz.

== See also ==
- Substituted tryptamine
