= 5-Halo-DMT =

5-Halo-DMT, also known as 5-halo-N,N-dimethyltryptamine, may refer to:

- 5-Fluoro-DMT
- 5-Chloro-DMT
- 5-Bromo-DMT
- 5-Iodo-DMT

== See also ==
- Substituted tryptamine
- Fluorodimethyltryptamine
- BK-NM-AMT § Derivatives
