= 6-Methyl-DMT =

Clinical data
- Other names: 6-Me-DMT; 6-Methyl-N,N-dimethyltryptamine; 6,N,N-Trimethyltryptamine; 6,N,N-TMT; 6-TMT
- Drug class: Serotonin receptor modulator
- ATC code: None

Identifiers
- IUPAC name: N,N-dimethyl-2-(6-methyl-1H-indol-3-yl)ethanamine
- PubChem CID: 12650287
- ChemSpider: 23118495
- ChEMBL: ChEMBL20860

Chemical and physical data
- Formula: C_{13}H_{18}N_{2}
- Molar mass: 202.301 g·mol^{−1}
- 3D model (JSmol): Interactive image
- SMILES: CC1=CC2=C(C=C1)C(=CN2)CCN(C)C
- InChI: InChI=1S/C13H18N2/c1-10-4-5-12-11(6-7-15(2)3)9-14-13(12)8-10/h4-5,8-9,14H,6-7H2,1-3H3; Key:ODOKWPMMQYDQIA-UHFFFAOYSA-N

6-Methyl-DMT, or 6-Me-DMT, also known as 6-methyl-N,N-dimethyltryptamine or as 6,N,N-trimethyltryptamine (6,N,N-TMT or 6-TMT), is a serotonin receptor modulator of the tryptamine family related to dimethyltryptamine (DMT). It is the 6-methyl derivative of DMT.

== Use and effects ==
6-Methyl-DMT was not included nor mentioned in Alexander Shulgin's book TiHKAL (Tryptamines I Have Known and Loved).

== Pharmacology ==
=== Pharmacodynamics ===
6-Methyl-DMT showed about half the affinity of DMT for the ketanserin-labeled serotonin 5-HT_{2} receptor (K_{i} = 2,500 nM and 1,200 nM, respectively). The drug did not substitute for 5-MeO-DMT in rodent drug discrimination tests. According to David E. Nichols, 6-substituted tryptamines in general may be inactive as serotonergic psychedelics. However, 6-fluoro-AMT is known to be robustly active as a psychedelic.

== Chemistry ==
=== Synthesis ===
The chemical synthesis of 6-methyl-DMT has been described.

=== Analogues ===
Analogues of 6-methyl-DMT include 6-methyltryptamine, dimethyltryptamine (DMT), 6-MeO-DMT, 6-MeO-DiPT, 6-MeO-MiPT, 6-hydroxy-DMT, 6-hydroxy-DET, 6-fluoro-DMT, 6-fluoro-DET, 6-fluoro-AMT, O-4310 (1-iPr-6-F-4-HO-DMT), 1-methyl-DMT, 2-methyl-DMT, 4-methyl-DMT, 5-methyl-DMT, and 7-methyl-DMT, among others.

== History ==
6-Methyl-DMT was first described in the scientific literature by Richard Glennon and colleagues by 1980.

== See also ==
- Substituted tryptamine
