= 5-TFMO-DMT =

Chemical compound

5-(Trifluoromethoxy)-DMT

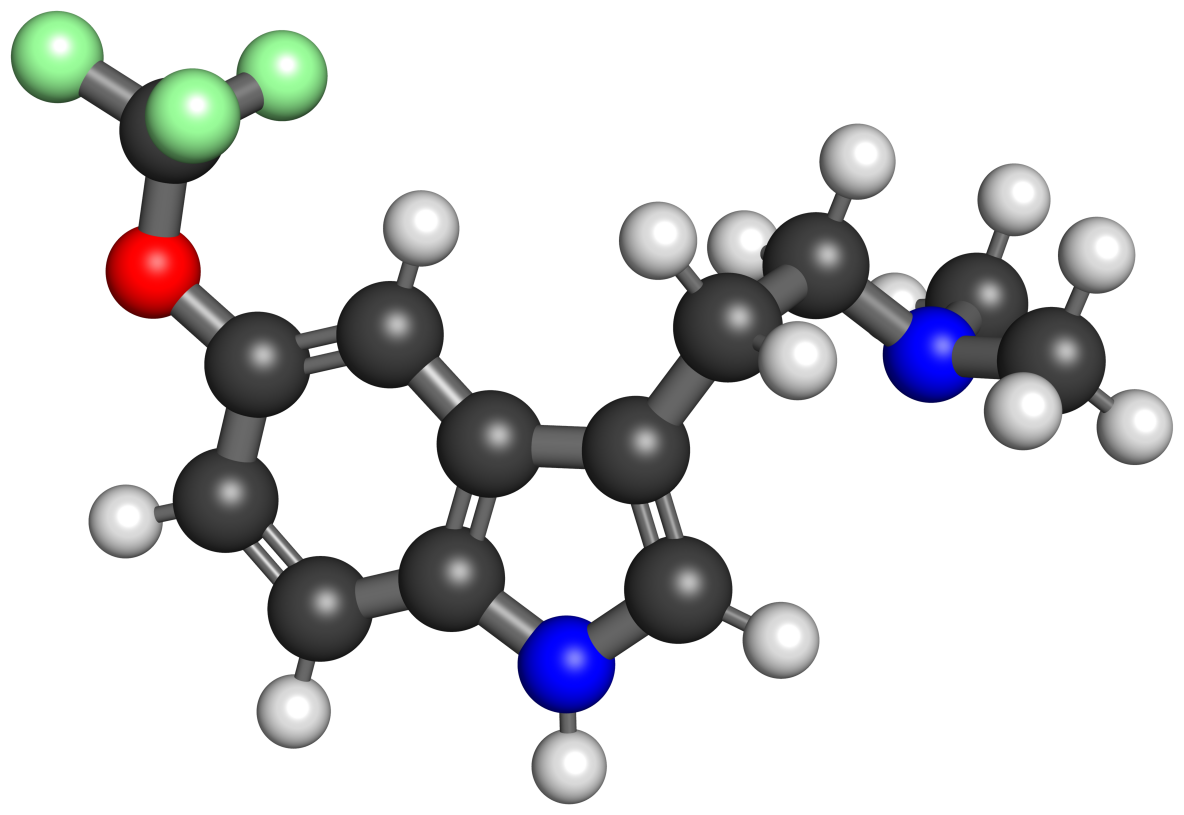

Clinical data
- Other names: 5-OCF3-DMT

Identifiers
- IUPAC name: N,N-dimethyl-5-(trifluoromethoxy)-1H-Indole-3-ethanamine
- CAS Number: 2857094-46-1
- PubChem CID: 166116644

Chemical and physical data
- Formula: C_{13}H_{15}F_{3}N_{2}O
- Molar mass: 272.271 g·mol^{−1}
- 3D model (JSmol): Interactive image
- SMILES: CN(C)CCC1=CNC2=CC=C(OC(F)(F)F)C=C21
- InChI: InChI=1S/C13H15F3N2O/c1-18(2)6-5-9-8-17-12-4-3-10(7-11(9)12)19-13(14,15)16/h3-4,7-8,17H,5-6H2,1-2H3; Key:ODQYGFDOWUZNBA-UHFFFAOYSA-N

5-TFMO-DMT (5-(trifluoromethoxy)-DMT, 5-OCF3-DMT, 5-(trifluoromethoxy)-N,N-dimethyltryptamine) is a psychedelic tryptamine derivative related to drugs such as 5-MeO-DMT and DMT (DMT). It acts as an agonist at the 5-HT_{2A} receptor with an EC_{50} of 127.2 nM. It was shown to release serotonin (5-HT) from synaptosomal preparations, and to reduce immobility time in the forced-swim test in animal studies, suggesting that it might have antidepressant activity.

== See also ==
- Substituted tryptamine
- 5-MeO-DMT
- 5-EtO-DMT
- 5-Fluoro-DMT
- 5-Nitro-DMT
- 5-TFM-DMT
- 6-TFMO-DMT
