= 6-Fluoro-DET =

Chemical compound

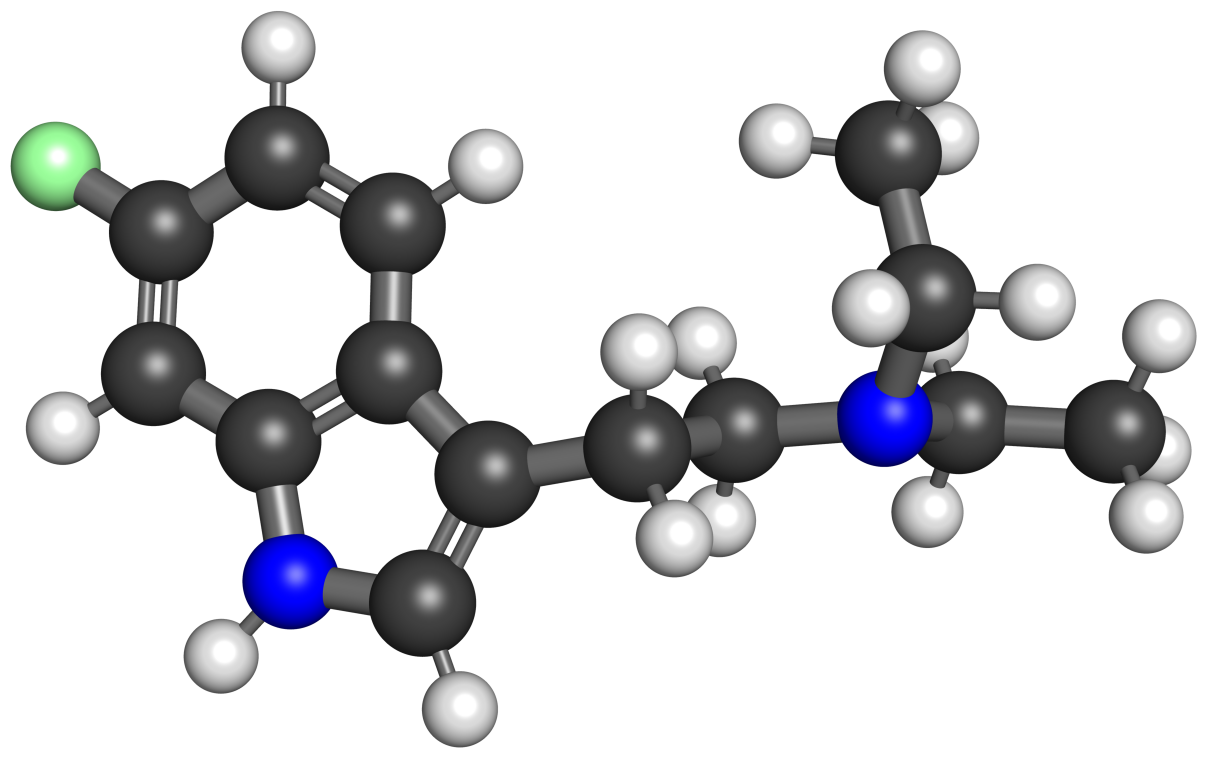

Clinical data
- Other names: 6-F-DET; 6-F-DET; 6-Fluoro-N,N-diethyltryptamine
- Drug class: Serotonin receptor modulator; Serotonin 5-HT_{2A} receptor agonist

Identifiers
- IUPAC name: N,N-diethyl-2-(6-fluoro-1H-indol-3-yl)ethanamine
- CAS Number: 2836-69-3
- PubChem CID: 17371
- ChemSpider: 16436
- UNII: 0ZD2XR6YPV
- ChEMBL: ChEMBL444612
- CompTox Dashboard (EPA): DTXSID301345652

Chemical and physical data
- Formula: C_{14}H_{19}FN_{2}
- Molar mass: 234.318 g·mol^{−1}
- 3D model (JSmol): Interactive image
- SMILES: CCN(CC)CCC1=CNC2=C1C=CC(=C2)F
- InChI: InChI=1S/C14H19FN2/c1-3-17(4-2)8-7-11-10-16-14-9-12(15)5-6-13(11)14/h5-6,9-10,16H,3-4,7-8H2,1-2H3; Key:RPWUTEXLVPDNEA-UHFFFAOYSA-N

6-Fluoro-DET, or 6-F-DET, also known as 6-fluoro-N,N-diethyltryptamine, is a substituted tryptamine derivative related to psychedelic drugs such as diethyltryptamine (DET).

== Use and effects ==
6-Fluoro-DET produces physiological effects but does not produce hallucinogenic effects in humans.

== Pharmacology ==
=== Pharmacodynamics ===
6-Fluoro-DET acts as a partial agonist at the serotonin 5-HT_{2A} receptor, but while it produces similar physiological effects to psychedelics, it does not appear to produce psychedelic effects itself even at high doses. Relatedly, 6-F-DET does not substitute for LSD in drug discrimination tests and does not produce the head-twitch response in rodents. For the preceding reasons, it saw some use as an active placebo in early clinical trials of psychedelic drugs, but was regarded as having little use otherwise, though more recent research into compounds such as AL-34662, tabernanthalog, and zalsupindole has shown that these kind of non-psychedelic serotonin 5-HT_{2A} agonists can have various useful applications.

A hypothesis for the lack of head-twitch response in mice and hallucinogenic effects in humans is that 6-F-DET acts as a 5-HT_{2A} receptor partial agonist of the G_{q} signaling pathway. This hypothesis explains the lack of hallucinogenic effects of other 5-HT_{2A} receptor ligands, which are also weak Gq agonists and below the efficacy threshold found to induce psychedelic effects, like 25N-N1-Nap, 2-Br-LSD, lisuride, tabernanthalog, and 6-MeO-DMT.

== Chemistry ==
=== Analogues ===
Analogues of 6-fluoro-DET include 6-fluoro-DMT, 5-fluoro-DMT, 5-chloro-DMT, 5-bromo-DMT, 5-fluoro-AMT, 6-fluoro-AMT, 6-methyl-DMT, 6-MeO-DMT, 6-hydroxy-DMT, and bretisilocin (5-fluoro-MET), among others.

== History ==
6-Fluoro-DET was first described in the scientific literature by Stephen Szara and colleagues by 1963.

== See also ==
- Substituted tryptamine
- Non-hallucinogenic 5-HT_{2A} receptor agonist
- 6-MeO-isoDMT
