= Methoxydimethyltryptamine =

Methoxydimethyltryptamine (methoxy-DMT, MeO-DMT, or OMe-DMT) may refer to:

- 1-Methoxy-DMT (1-MeO-DMT; lespedamine)
- 4-Methoxy-DMT (4-MeO-DMT; O-methylpsilocin; psilocin O-methyl ether; PSOM)
- 5-Methoxy-DMT (5-MeO-DMT; O-methylbufotenin; mebufotenin)
- 6-Methoxy-DMT (6-MeO-DMT)
- 7-Methoxy-DMT (7-MeO-DMT)

== See also ==
- Substituted tryptamine
- Hydroxydimethyltryptamine (hydroxy-DMT)
- Methoxydiethyltryptamine (methoxy-DET)
- Trimethyltryptamine (methyl-DMT)
