= 5-Chloro-DMT =

Psychedelic drug

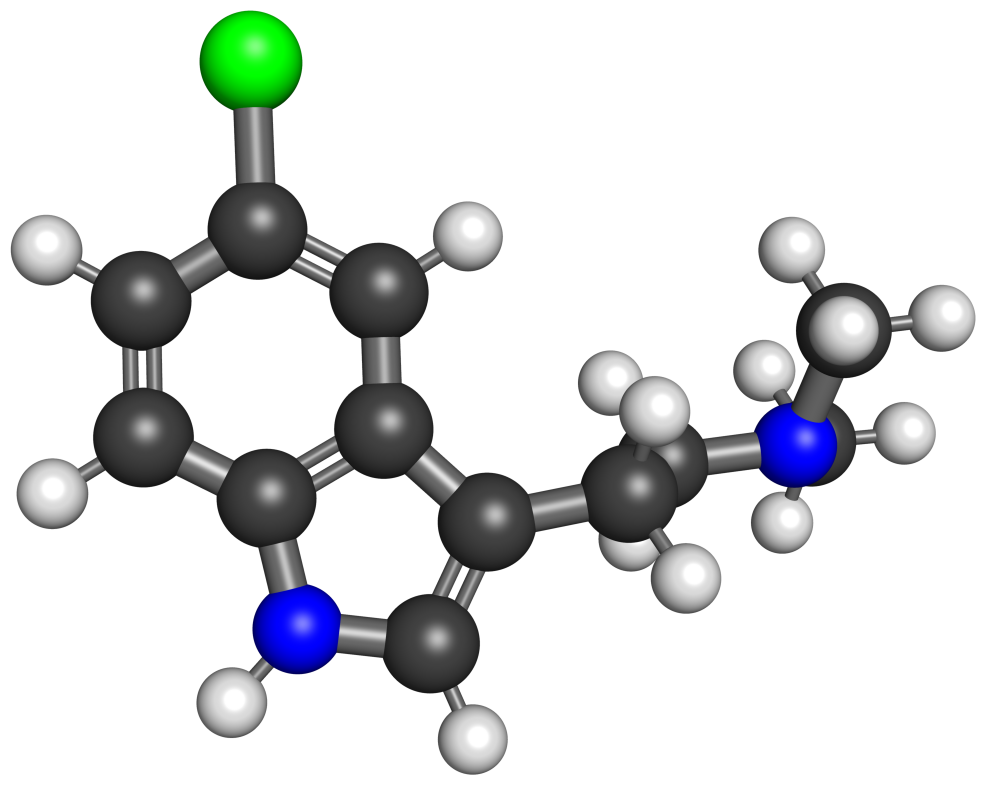

Clinical data
- Other names: 5-Chloro-N,N-dimethyltryptamine; 5-Chloro-DMT; 5-Cl-DMT
- Routes of administration: Unknown
- Drug class: Serotonin receptor agonist; Serotonin 5-HT_{2A} receptor agonist; Serotonergic psychedelic; Hallucinogen

Pharmacokinetic data
- Onset of action: Unknown
- Duration of action: Unknown

Identifiers
- IUPAC name: 2-(5-chloro-1H-indol-3-yl)-N,N-dimethylethanamine
- CAS Number: 22120-32-7
- PubChem CID: 2762739
- ChemSpider: 2043437
- UNII: S62WYB8S7C
- CompTox Dashboard (EPA): DTXSID90376408

Chemical and physical data
- Formula: C_{12}H_{15}ClN_{2}
- Molar mass: 222.72 g·mol^{−1}
- 3D model (JSmol): Interactive image
- SMILES: CN(C)CCC1=CNC2=C1C=C(C=C2)Cl
- InChI: InChI=1S/C12H15ClN2/c1-15(2)6-5-9-8-14-12-4-3-10(13)7-11(9)12/h3-4,7-8,14H,5-6H2,1-2H3; Key:BXYDWQABVPBLBU-UHFFFAOYSA-N

5-Chloro-DMT, or 5-Cl-DMT, also known as 5-chloro-N,N-dimethyltryptamine, is a psychedelic drug of the tryptamine family related to dimethyltryptamine (DMT) and other psychedelic tryptamines such as 5-bromo-DMT and 5-fluoro-DMT. It has been encountered as a novel designer drug.

== Use and effects ==
5-Chloro-DMT was not included nor mentioned in Alexander Shulgin's book TiHKAL (Tryptamines I Have Known and Loved). No experience reports existed for the drug as of 2020. In addition, its routes of administration and doses were unavailable as of 2020. In any case, it is known that the closely structurally related psychedelics DMT, 5-bromo-DMT, and 5-MeO-DMT which have low oral activity. In 2023, Hamilton Morris described 5-chloro-DMT as being of reduced activity relative to DMT similarly to 5-bromo-DMT.

== Pharmacology ==
=== Pharmacodynamics ===
5-Chloro-DMT activities
Target	Affinity (K_{i}, nM)
5-HT_{1A}	33 (K_{i}); 41 (EC_{50}); 94% (E_{max})
5-HT_{2A}	134 (K_{i}); 310^{a} (EC_{50}); 45%^{a} (E_{max})
5-HT_{2C}	55 (K_{i}); 22^{a} (EC_{50}); 81%^{a} (E_{max})
SERT	830 (K_{i}); 394 (IC_{50})
Notes: The smaller the value, the more avidly the drug interacts with the site. Footnotes: ^{a} = Stimulation of IP_{1} formation. Sources:

5-Chloro-DMT acts as a serotonin receptor agonist. It is known to have affinity for and act as an agonist of the serotonin 5-HT_{1A}, 5-HT_{2A}, and 5-HT_{2C} receptors. The drug shows higher affinity for the serotonin 5-HT_{1A} receptor compared to unsubstituted dimethyltryptamine (DMT), with around 10-fold higher selectivity for this receptor over the serotonin 5-HT_{2A} receptor. It exhibits lower efficacy in terms of serotonin 5-HT_{2A} receptor calcium mobilization relative to the parent compound DMT.

The drug produces the head-twitch response, a behavioral proxy of psychedelic effects, in rodents, with intermediate potency among halogenated derivatives. In addition, it produces hypolocomotion and hypothermia, effects that appear to be mediated through serotonin 5-HT_{1A} receptor activation.

5-Chloro-DMT demonstrates similar biased agonism patterns at the serotonin 5-HT_{2A} receptor compared to other halogenated derivatives, showing higher potency and efficacy for β-arrestin2 recruitment relative to miniG_{αq} recruitment, with bias factors comparable to serotonin.

== Chemistry ==
=== Analogues ===
Analogues of 5-chloro-DMT include 5-chlorotryptamine, dimethyltryptamine (DMT), 5-fluoro-DMT, 5-bromo-DMT, 5-TFM-DMT, 6-fluoro-DMT, bretisilocin (5-fluoro-MET), 5-chloro-AMT, 6-fluoro-AMT, 7-chloro-AMT, and 5,N,N-TMT, among others.

== History ==
5-Chloro-DMT was first described in the scientific literature by Benington and colleagues by 1960. It was encountered as a novel designer drug by 2020.

== Society and culture ==
=== Legal status ===
==== Canada ====
5-Chloro-DMT is not a controlled substance in Canada as of 2025.

==== United States ====
5-Chloro-DMT is not an explicitly controlled substance in the United States. However, it could be considered a controlled substance under the Federal Analogue Act if intended for human consumption.

== See also ==
- Substituted tryptamine
