= 5,6-Dibromo-N-methyltryptamine =

Chemical compound

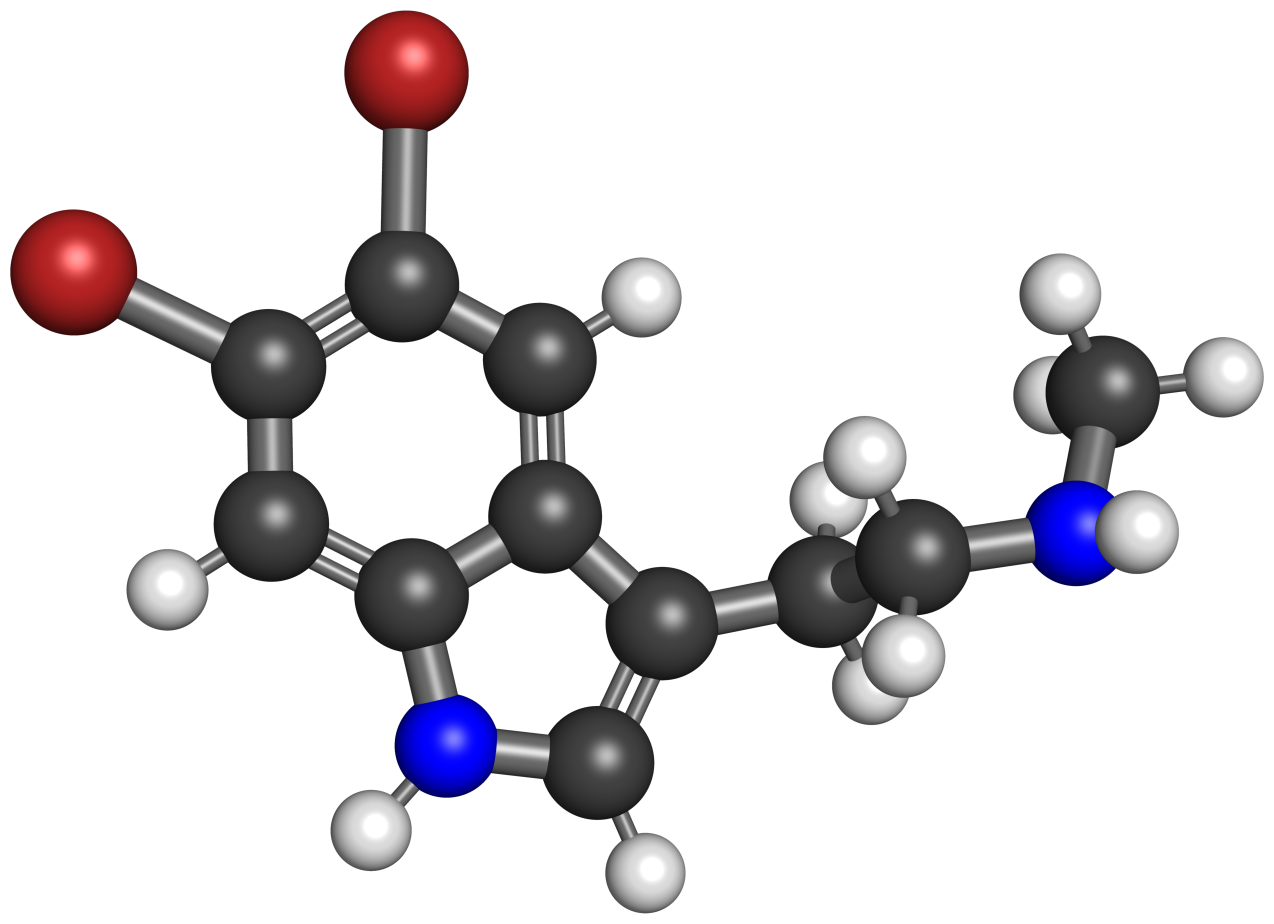

Clinical data
- Other names: 5,6-Dibromo-NMT

Identifiers
- IUPAC name: 2-(5,6-Dibromo-1H-indol-3-yl)-N-methylethanamine
- CAS Number: 41115-68-8
- PubChem CID: 309210
- ChemSpider: 273390
- UNII: WXL6YC9X88
- CompTox Dashboard (EPA): DTXSID50309237

Chemical and physical data
- Formula: C_{11}H_{12}Br_{2}N_{2}
- Molar mass: 332.039 g·mol^{−1}
- 3D model (JSmol): Interactive image
- SMILES: CNCCc1c[nH]c2cc(Br)c(Br)cc12
- InChI: InChI=1S/C11H12Br2N2/c1-14-3-2-7-6-15-11-5-10(13)9(12)4-8(7)11/h4-6,14-15H,2-3H2,1H3; Key:XYEURTBVGQLDGD-UHFFFAOYSA-N

5,6-Dibromo-N-methyltryptamine, also known as 5,6-dibromo-NMT, is a substituted tryptamine alkaloid that occurs naturally in marine sponges.

== See also ==
- 5,6-Dibromotryptamine
- 6-Bromotryptamine
- 5-Bromo-DMT
