= 6-TFMO-DMT =

Clinical data
- Other names: 6-Trifluoromethoxy-DMT; 6-Trifluoromethoxy-N,N-dimethyltryptamine
- Drug class: Serotonin receptor modulator; Serotonin 5-HT_{2A} receptor agonist; Psychedelic drug; Hallucinogen
- ATC code: None

Identifiers
- IUPAC name: N,N-dimethyl-2-[6-(trifluoromethoxy)-1H-indol-3-yl]ethanamine
- PubChem CID: 172291242

Chemical and physical data
- Formula: C_{13}H_{15}F_{3}N_{2}O
- Molar mass: 272.271 g·mol^{−1}
- 3D model (JSmol): Interactive image
- SMILES: CN(C)CCC1=CNC2=C1C=CC(=C2)OC(F)(F)F
- InChI: InChI=1S/C13H15F3N2O/c1-18(2)6-5-9-8-17-12-7-10(3-4-11(9)12)19-13(14,15)16/h3-4,7-8,17H,5-6H2,1-2H3; Key:TZLAKZDAVNSCDO-UHFFFAOYSA-N

6-TFMO-DMT, also known as 6-trifluoromethoxy-DMT or as 6-trifluoromethoxy-N,N-dimethyltryptamine, is a psychedelic drug of the tryptamine family. It is an analogue of 5-MeO-DMT, 6-MeO-DMT, and 5-TFMO-DMT. The drug shows affinity for the serotonin 5-HT_{1A} and 5-HT_{2A} receptors. Its affinities for these receptors were substantially reduced compared to those of dimethyltryptamine (DMT) and 5-MeO-DMT. 6-TFMO-DMT was inactive as an agonist of the serotonin 5-HT_{1A} receptor, but was active as an agonist of the serotonin 5-HT_{2A} receptor, with dramatically reduced potency compared to 5-MeO-DMT and a few-fold lower potency than DMT. The drug robustly induced the head-twitch response, a behavioral proxy of psychedelic effects, in rodents, with similar maximal efficacy as psilocin. 6-TFMO-DMT was first described in the scientific literature by Xue Chen and colleagues by 2023.

== See also ==
- Substituted tryptamine
- 5-TFMO-DMT
- 6-MeO-DMT
