= 6-Fluoro-AMT =

Chemical compound

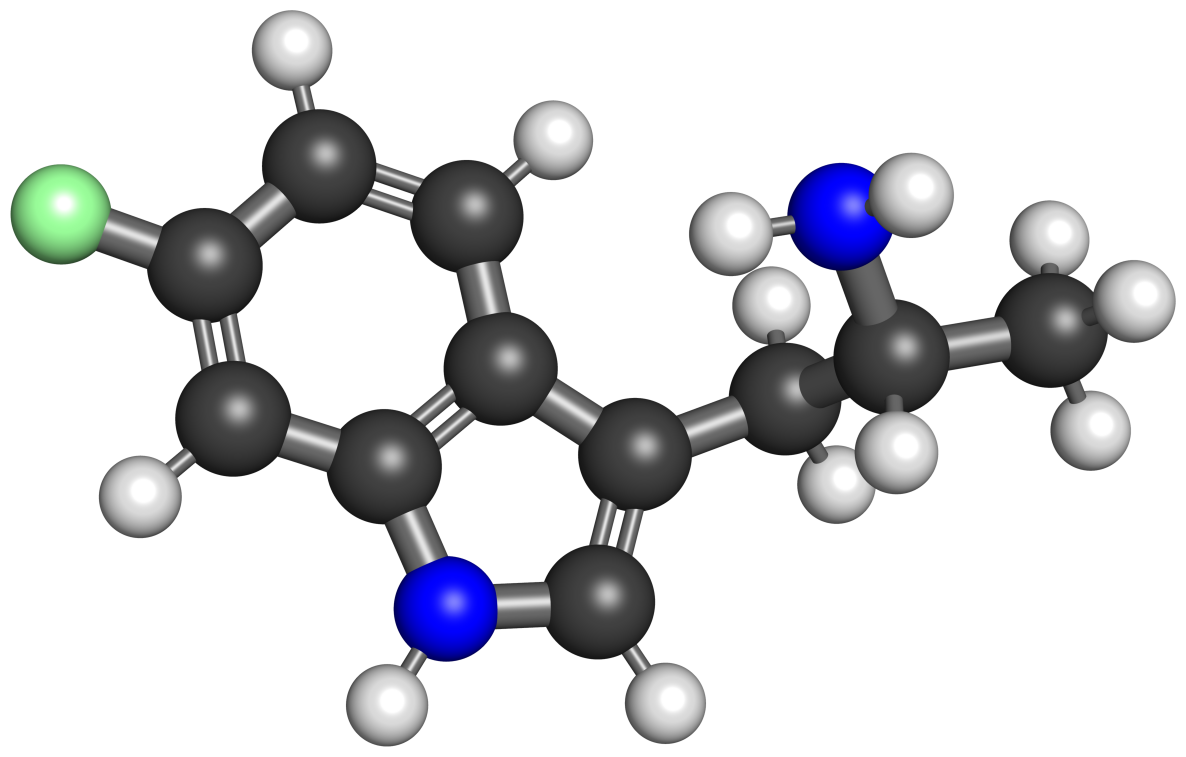

Clinical data
- Other names: 6-Fluoro-AMT; 6-Fluoro-αMT; 6F-AMT; 6F-αMT; 6-F-AMT; 6-F-αMT; 6-Fluoro-α-methyltryptamine
- Routes of administration: Oral
- Drug class: Serotonergic psychedelic; Hallucinogen

Identifiers
- IUPAC name: 1-(6-fluoro-1H-indol-3-yl)propan-2-amine
- CAS Number: 712-11-8
- PubChem CID: 15289992
- ChemSpider: 14228507
- UNII: 46F5HN29NW
- CompTox Dashboard (EPA): DTXSID701045426

Chemical and physical data
- Formula: C_{11}H_{13}FN_{2}
- Molar mass: 192.237 g·mol^{−1}
- 3D model (JSmol): Interactive image
- SMILES: NC(C)CC1=CNC2=CC(F)=CC=C21
- InChI: InChI=1S/C11H13FN2/c1-7(13)4-8-6-14-11-5-9(12)2-3-10(8)11/h2-3,5-7,14H,4,13H2,1H3; Key:XYJYWUUXCUJXAI-UHFFFAOYSA-N

6-Fluoro-AMT, or 6-fluoro-αMT, also known as 6-fluoro-α-methyltryptamine, is a psychedelic drug of the tryptamine family related to α-methyltryptamine (AMT) and 5-MeO-AMT.

== Use and effects ==
6-Fluoro-AMT was allegedly manufactured and sold from the laboratory operated by Leonard Pickard and Gordon Todd Skinner, who described 6-fluoro-AMT as "a beast". In interviews, Skinner stated that he first began to experiment with 6-fluoro-AMT in the early 1980s by giving it to high school friends. Their experiences made him cautious about the appropriate doses, which he said ranged from 25 to 75 mg (Skinner weighed about 250 lbs at the time of his own bioassay). Skinner said that 6-fluoro-AMT is a long-lasting psychedelic with more time distortion and that it was enhanced by combination with ALD-52.

== Pharmacology ==
=== Pharmacodynamics ===
Animal tests showed the drug to be somewhat less potent in terms of pharmacological activity than AMT or 5-fluoro-AMT. It produces the head-twitch response, a behavioral proxy of psychedelic-like effects, in rodents. Its IC_{50} for monoamine oxidase A (MAO-A) inhibition is 580 to 1,800 nM, compared to 180 to 450 nM for 5-fluoro-AMT and 380 nM for AMT.

== Chemistry ==
=== Analogues ===
Analogues of 6-fluoro-AMT include α-methyltryptamine (AMT), 5-fluoro-AMT, 5-chloro-AMT, 5-fluoro-AET, 5-chloro-AET, 6-fluoro-DMT, 6-fluoro-DET, 6-methyl-DMT, 6-MeO-DMT, 6-hydroxy-DMT, 7-chloro-AMT, and O-4310 (1-isopropyl-6-fluoro-4-HO-DMT), among others.

== History ==
6-Fluoro-AMT was first described in the scientific literature, by Asher Kalir and Stephen Szara, by at least 1963.

== Society and culture ==
=== Legal status ===
==== Canada ====
6-Fluoro-AMT is not an explicitly nor implicitly controlled substance in Canada as of 2025.

==== United States ====
6-Fluoro-AMT is not an explicitly controlled substance in the United States. However, it could be considered a controlled substance under the Federal Analogue Act if intended for human consumption.

== See also ==
- Substituted α-alkyltryptamine
