= 5-Chlorotryptamine =

Clinical data
- Other names: 5-Chloro-T; 5-Cl-T; 5-ClT; PAL-441; PAL441
- Drug class: Serotonin receptor modulator; Serotonin 5-HT_{2A} receptor agonist; Serotonin releasing agent
- ATC code: None

Identifiers
- IUPAC name: 2-(5-chloro-1H-indol-3-yl)ethanamine
- CAS Number: 3764-94-1
- PubChem CID: 77379
- ChemSpider: 69793
- UNII: 9V4S232P62
- ChEMBL: ChEMBL1288716
- CompTox Dashboard (EPA): DTXSID50191073
- ECHA InfoCard: 100.021.077

Chemical and physical data
- Formula: C_{10}H_{11}ClN_{2}
- Molar mass: 194.66 g·mol^{−1}
- 3D model (JSmol): Interactive image
- SMILES: C1=CC2=C(C=C1Cl)C(=CN2)CCN
- InChI: InChI=1S/C10H11ClN2/c11-8-1-2-10-9(5-8)7(3-4-12)6-13-10/h1-2,5-6,13H,3-4,12H2; Key:FVQKQPVVCKOWLM-UHFFFAOYSA-N

5-Chlorotryptamine (5-Cl-T; developmental code name PAL-441) is a serotonin receptor modulator and monoamine releasing agent of the tryptamine family. It is the 5-chloro derivative of tryptamine.

The drug shows affinity for the serotonin 5-HT_{1A}, 5-HT_{2A}, 5-HT_{6}, and 5-HT_{7} receptors (K_{i} = 5.5–16 nM, 317–889 nM, 38 nM, and 16 nM, respectively). It acts as a potent agonist of the serotonin 5-HT_{1A} receptor (EC_{50} = 3,846 nM) and of the 5-HT_{2A} receptor (EC_{50} = 4.11–145 nM; E_{max} = 109%). In addition, 5-chlorotryptamine is a serotonin releasing agent (SRA), with EC_{50} values for induction of monoamine release of 19.1 nM for serotonin, 476 nM for dopamine, and >10,000 nM for norepinephrine in rat brain synaptosomes. Similarly to tryptamine and other simple amine-unsubstituted tryptamines, 5-chlorotryptamine was ineffective in producing the head-twitch response, a behavioral proxy of psychedelic effects, in rodents.

Tryptamines without substitutions at the amine or alpha carbon, such as tryptamine, serotonin (5-hydroxytryptamine; 5-HT), and 5-methoxytryptamine (5-MeO-T), are known to be very rapidly metabolized and thereby inactivated by monoamine oxidase A (MAO-A) in vivo and to have very short elimination half-lives. However, given intravenously at sufficiently high doses, tryptamine is still known to be able to produce weak and short-lived psychoactive effects in humans.

The chemical synthesis of 5-chlorotryptamine has been described.

5-Chlorotryptamine was first described in the scientific literature by 1959.

== See also ==
- Substituted tryptamine
- 5-Fluorotryptamine
- 5-Bromotryptamine
- 7-Chlorotryptamine
- 5-Chloro-DMT
- 5-Chloro-AMT
