= 4-Fluorotryptamine =

Clinical data
- Other names: 4-Fluoro-T; 4-F-T; 4-FT; PAL-551; PAL551
- Drug class: Serotonin receptor modulator; Serotonin 5-HT_{2A} receptor agonist; Serotonin–dopamine releasing agent
- ATC code: None

Identifiers
- IUPAC name: 2-(4-fluoro-1H-indol-3-yl)ethanamine
- CAS Number: 467452-26-2
- PubChem CID: 20976025
- ChemSpider: 19879143
- ChEMBL: ChEMBL382635
- CompTox Dashboard (EPA): DTXSID90610117

Chemical and physical data
- Formula: C_{10}H_{11}FN_{2}
- Molar mass: 178.210 g·mol^{−1}
- 3D model (JSmol): Interactive image
- SMILES: C1=CC2=C(C(=C1)F)C(=CN2)CCN
- InChI: InChI=1S/C10H11FN2/c11-8-2-1-3-9-10(8)7(4-5-12)6-13-9/h1-3,6,13H,4-5,12H2; Key:QTNVDKAISCZLHR-UHFFFAOYSA-N

4-Fluorotryptamine (4-FT; developmental code name PAL-551) is a serotonin receptor modulator and monoamine releasing agent of the tryptamine family. It is the 4-fluoro derivative of tryptamine.

The drug acts as a potent full agonist of the serotonin 5-HT_{2A} receptor, with an EC_{50} of 28 nM and an E_{max} of 108%. In addition, it is a serotonin–dopamine releasing agent (SDRA), with EC_{50} values for induction of monoamine release of 108 nM for serotonin, 106 nM for dopamine, and 1,123 nM for norepinephrine in rat brain synaptosomes.

Tryptamines without substitutions at the amine or alpha carbon, such as tryptamine, serotonin (5-hydroxytryptamine; 5-HT), and 5-methoxytryptamine (5-MeO-T), are known to be very rapidly metabolized and thereby inactivated by monoamine oxidase A (MAO-A) in vivo and to have very short elimination half-lives. However, given intravenously at sufficiently high doses, tryptamine is still known to be able to produce weak and short-lived psychoactive effects in humans.

The chemical synthesis of 4-fluorotryptamine has been described.

4-Fluorotryptamine was first described in the scientific literature by 2014.

== See also ==
- Substituted tryptamine
- 4-Fluoro-DMT
- 4-F-5-MeO-DMT
- 4-F-5-MeO-pyr-T
- HBL20017 (4-F-5-MeS-DMT)
