= 5,6-Dibromotryptamine =

Chemical compound

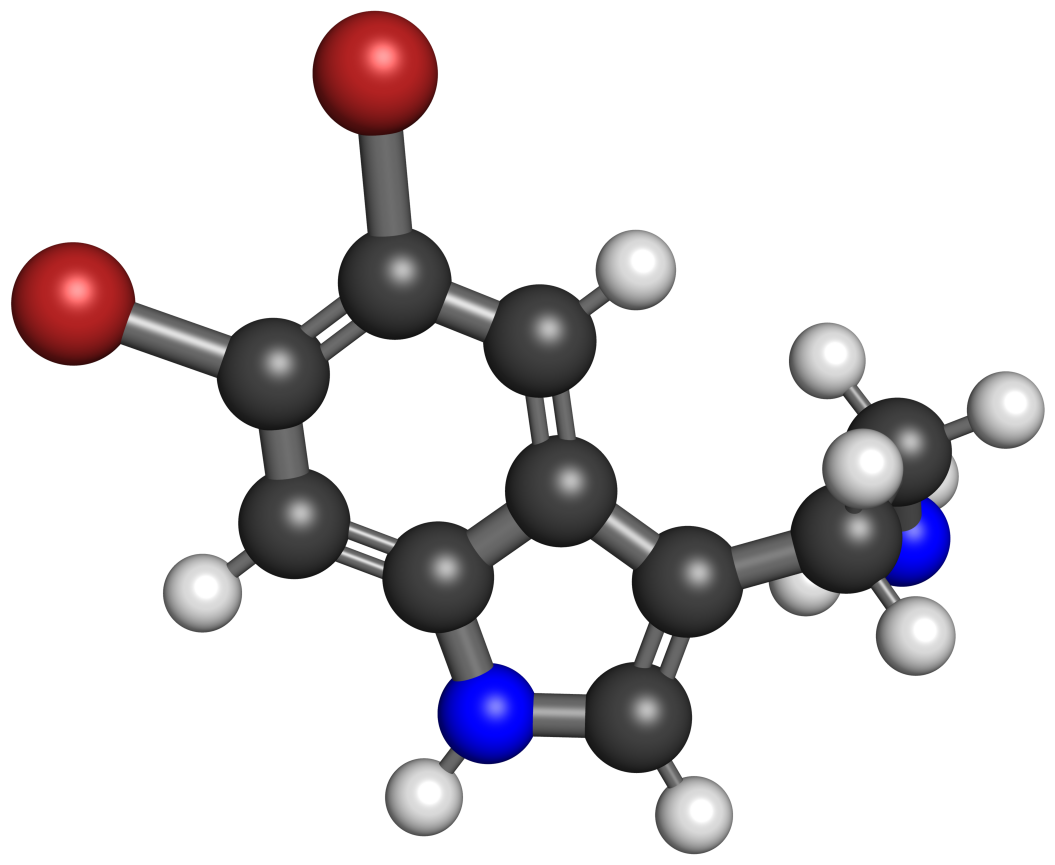

Identifiers
- IUPAC name: 2-(5,6-dibromo-1H-indol-3-yl)ethanamine
- CAS Number: 41115-69-9
- PubChem CID: 309209
- ChemSpider: 273389
- UNII: N5ZVP2A44V
- ChEMBL: ChEMBL256339
- CompTox Dashboard (EPA): DTXSID90309236

Chemical and physical data
- Formula: C_{10}H_{10}Br_{2}N_{2}
- Molar mass: 318.012 g·mol^{−1}
- 3D model (JSmol): Interactive image
- SMILES: C1=C2C(=CC(=C1Br)Br)NC=C2CCN
- InChI: InChI=1S/C10H10Br2N2/c11-8-3-7-6(1-2-13)5-14-10(7)4-9(8)12/h3-5,14H,1-2,13H2; Key:QCSXERFQDJZYFJ-UHFFFAOYSA-N

5,6-Dibromotryptamine is a substituted tryptamine and indolic alkaloid found in some marine sponges such as Hyrtios sp. found in the South Pacific area. 5,6-Dibromotryptamine is potentially an anti bacterial and anti cancer agent.

== See also ==
- 5,6-Dibromo-N-methyltryptamine
- 6-Bromotryptamine
- 5-Bromo-DMT
