= 4-Fluoro-DMT =

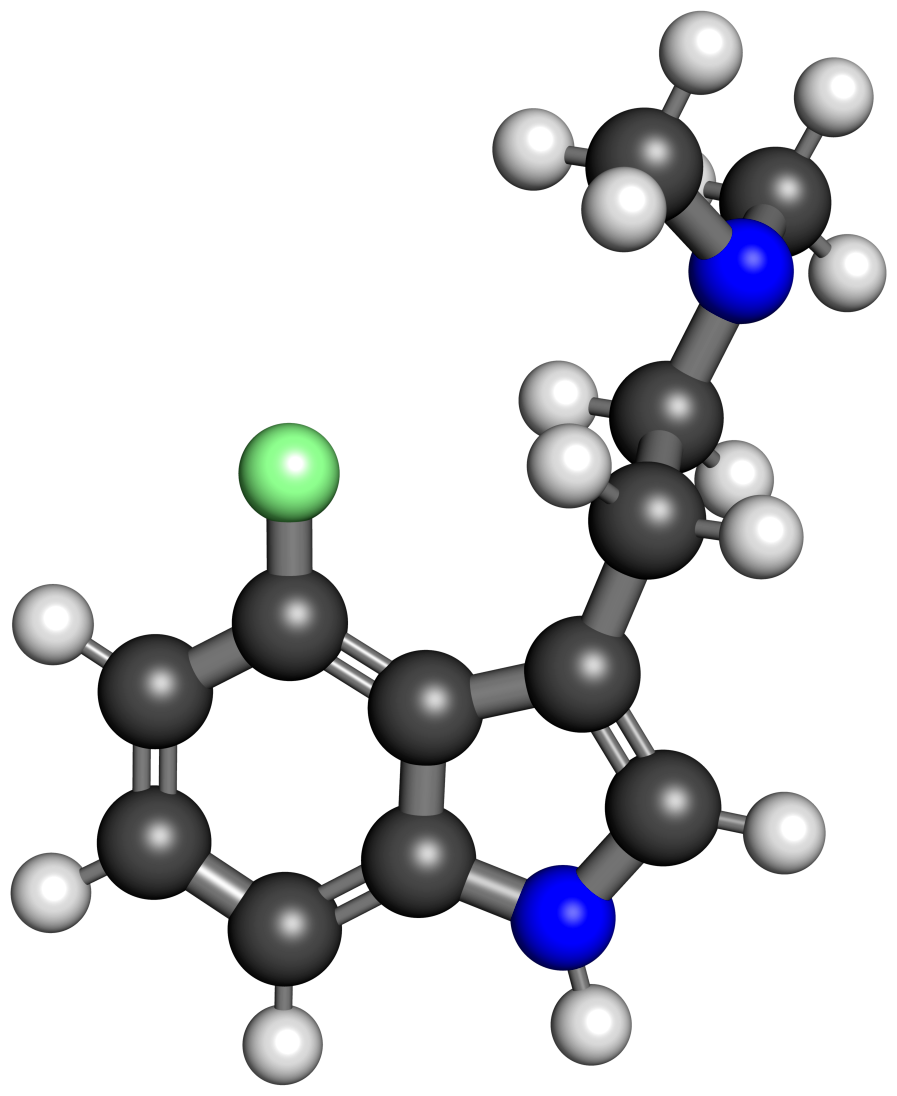

Clinical data
- Other names: 4-Fluoro-N,N-dimethyltryptamine; 4-F-DMT; 4F-DMT
- Routes of administration: Sublingual, inhalation
- Drug class: Serotonin 5-HT_{2C} receptor agonist; Psychoactive drug; Entactogen
- ATC code: None

Pharmacokinetic data
- Onset of action: 40 minutes
- Duration of action: 2–3 hours

Identifiers
- IUPAC name: 2-(4-fluoro-1H-indol-3-yl)-N,N-dimethylethanamine
- CAS Number: 1644-64-0
- PubChem CID: 11492162
- ChemSpider: 9666968
- UNII: A2FA8F63VS
- ChEMBL: ChEMBL197646

Chemical and physical data
- Formula: C_{12}H_{15}FN_{2}
- Molar mass: 206.264 g·mol^{−1}
- 3D model (JSmol): Interactive image
- SMILES: CN(C)CCC1=CNC2=C1C(=CC=C2)F
- InChI: InChI=1S/C12H15FN2/c1-15(2)7-6-9-8-14-11-5-3-4-10(13)12(9)11/h3-5,8,14H,6-7H2,1-2H3; Key:ISJZKVWGUWBUFG-UHFFFAOYSA-N

4-Fluoro-DMT (or 4-F-DMT), also known as 4-fluoro-N,N-dimethyltryptamine, is a serotonin receptor agonist of the tryptamine family and a close analogue of psilocin (4-HO-DMT) and dimethyltryptamine (DMT). It is a modestly selective serotonin 5-HT_{2C} receptor full agonist and doesn't appear to produce psychedelic-like effects in animals but instead produces antiobsessional-like effects. It has been encountered online as a novel designer drug, with claimed mild entactogen-like effects.

== Use and effects ==
According to an unverified online anecdotal report, 4-fluoro-DMT is said to produce mild entactogen-like effects, such as enhanced sociability, empathy, and communication and a feeling of peace, with few or no psychedelic effects. It was described as being like a lighter version of MDMA and being like an LSD or psilocybin afterglow. However, there was also said to be a slight feeling of "psychedelic dissociation". The drug is said to be active at doses of 10 to 30 mg sublingually and 15 mg by inhalation. Its onset is said to be 40 minutes and its duration is said to be 2 to 3 hours.

== Pharmacology ==
=== Pharmacodynamics ===
4-Fluoro-DMT's affinity (K_{i}) for the serotonin 5-HT_{1A} receptor was 135 nM. This can be compared to psilocin's affinity of 378 nM and serotonin's affinity of 1.7 nM. In another study, 4-F-DMT showed affinities (K_{i}) of 335 nM for the serotonin 5-HT_{2A} receptor, 8.39 nM for the serotonin 5-HT_{2B} receptor, and 82–84 nM for the serotonin 5-HT_{2C} receptor. Its activational potencies (EC_{50}) and efficacies (E_{max}) were 949 nM (49%) at the serotonin 5-HT_{2A} receptor, 1,180 nM (38%) at the serotonin 5-HT_{2B} receptor, and 99 nM (93%) at the serotonin 5-HT_{2C} receptor. 4-F-DMT showed dramatically less potent EC_{50} values at the serotonin 5-HT_{2A} and 5-HT_{2B} receptors compared to psilocin (40- and 20-fold less potent), whereas its potency was less markedly reduced at the serotonin 5-HT_{2C} receptor (about 3-fold less potent). Hence, whereas psilocin is a balanced agonist of the serotonin 5-HT_{2} receptors, 4-F-DMT is a selective serotonin 5-HT_{2C} receptor agonist with about 10-fold preference for activation of this receptor over the serotonin 5-HT_{2A} and 5-HT_{2B} receptors. Moreover, whereas psilocin was a partial agonist of the serotonin 5-HT_{2C} receptor (E_{max} = 51%), 4-F-DMT had higher efficacy and was a full agonist (E_{max} = 93%).

4-F-DMT produced partial generalization (0–56%) to LSD in animal drug discrimination tests, but this was not statistically significant and an ED_{50} was not calculated. It also failed to substitute for DOI in drug discrimination tests (10–33%). Conversely, psilocin produced full generalization at much lower doses. Hence, 4-F-DMT may not be hallucinogenic in humans. On the other hand, the drug was dose-dependently and strongly active in producing antiobsessional-like effects in an animal model of obsessive–compulsive disorder (OCD) (specifically inhibition of serotonin-induced scratching behavior), an effect that it is thought may be mediated by serotonin 5-HT_{2C} receptor agonism.

== Chemistry ==
=== Properties ===
4-F-DMT is more lipophilic than psilocin (4-HO-DMT) due to lacking its hydrophilic hydroxyl group, and hence 4-F-DMT might cross the blood–brain barrier more readily than psilocin.

=== Synthesis ===
The chemical synthesis of 4-fluoro-DMT has been described.

=== Analogues ===
Analogues of 4-F-DMT include dimethyltryptamine (DMT), 4-bromo-DMT, psilocin (4-HO-DMT), 4-methyl-DMT, 4-MeO-DMT, and 5-fluoro-DMT, among others. Derivatives of 4-F-DMT such as 4-fluoro-5-methoxy-DMT (4-F-5-MeO-DMT) and HBL20017 (4-F-5-MeS-DMT) have also been synthesized and studied.

== History ==
4-F-DMT was first synthesized and described in the scientific literature by 1964. It was encountered online as a novel designer drug in 2025.

== See also ==
- Substituted tryptamine
- 4-Fluorotryptamine
- 5-Fluoro-DMT
- 6-Fluoro-DMT
- 4-F-5-MeO-DMT
- 4-F-5-MeO-pyr-T
- 4-MeO-MiPT
