= 4-Fluoro-5-methoxy-DMT =

Chemical compound

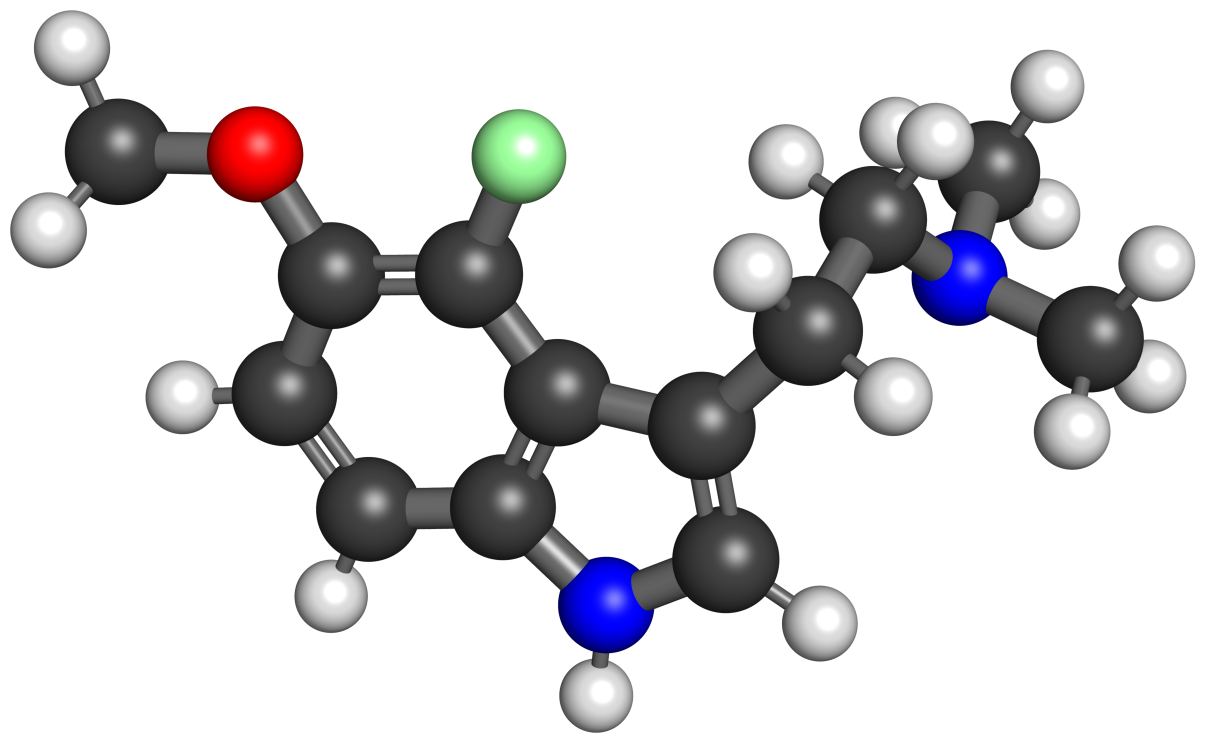

Identifiers
- IUPAC name: 4-Fluoro-5-Methoxy-N,N-dimethyltryptamine
- CAS Number: 312314-18-4
- PubChem CID: 10082834
- ChemSpider: 8258372
- UNII: 3E926T8YGD
- CompTox Dashboard (EPA): DTXSID001029532

Chemical and physical data
- Formula: C_{13}H_{17}FN_{2}O
- Molar mass: 236.290 g·mol^{−1}
- 3D model (JSmol): Interactive image
- SMILES: CN(C)CCC1=CNC2=C1C(=C(C=C2)OC)F
- InChI: InChI=1S/C13H17FN2O/c1-16(2)7-6-9-8-15-10-4-5-11(17-3)13(14)12(9)10/h4-5,8,15H,6-7H2,1-3H3; Key:CTEKFOKTEGQYLO-UHFFFAOYSA-N

4-Fluoro-5-methoxy-N,N-dimethyltryptamine (4-F-5-MeO-DMT) was first described by David E. Nichols team in 2000. It is a potent 5-HT_{1A} receptor agonist. Substitution with the 4-fluorine markedly increased 5-HT_{1A} selectivity over 5-HT_{2A}_{/2C} receptors with potency greater than that of the 5-HT_{1A} agonist 8-OH-DPAT.

The analog compound with the N,N-dialkyl substituents constrained into a pyrrolidine ring, is a slightly stronger agonist for the 5-HT_{1A} receptor and retains the selectivity over the 5-HT_{2A/2C} receptors.

== See also ==
- Substituted tryptamine
- 4-Fluorotryptamine
- 4-HO-5-MeO-DMT
- 5-Fluoro-AMT
- 6-Fluoro-DMT
- 7F-5-MeO-MET
- 4-F-5-MeO-pyr-T
- HBL20017 (4-F-5-MeS-DMT)
