= Flubatine =

Identifiers
- IUPAC name: (1R,5S,6S)-6-(6-(18F)fluoranylpyridin-3-yl)-8-azabicyclo[3.2.1]octane
- CAS Number: 1012885-77-6
- PubChem CID: 71724875
- ChemSpider: 129434972
- UNII: CN2ULA1988

Chemical and physical data
- 3D model (JSmol): Interactive image
- SMILES: C1C[C@@H]2C[C@H]([C@H](C1)N2)C3=CN=C(C=C3)[18F]
- InChI: InChI=1S/C12H15FN2/c13-12-5-4-8(7-14-12)10-6-9-2-1-3-11(10)15-9/h4-5,7,9-11,15H,1-3,6H2/t9-,10+,11+/m1/s1/i13-1; Key:FDFUKZJWVPEZEH-MEPPPMTQSA-N

Flubatine ([18F]-norchloro-fluoro-homoepibatidine) is a fluorine-18 (^{18}F) labeled radiotracer and radioligand for positron emission tomography (PET) imaging, developed as a high-affinity ligand for brain nicotinic acetylcholine receptors (nAChRs) of the α4β2 subtype. It is used to image cholinergic deficits in disorders such as Alzheimer’s disease and Parkinson’s disease. Both (+)- and (−)- enantiomer bind specifically to α4β2 nAChRs.

== Synthesis ==
Flubatine is prepared by radiolabeling a precursor molecule with fluorine-18 under no-carrier-added conditions. The synthetic route involves two main steps:

- Precursor synthesis: Optically pure precursor compounds (one for each enantiomer) are synthesized by organic chemical methods starting from epibatidine-like intermediates.
- Radiolabeling: The [^{18}F]fluoride ion is introduced by nucleophilic aromatic substitution of the precursor under controlled conditions (often using cryptand-assisted [^{18}F]fluoride and heat). Using a trimethylammonium leaving group on the pyridine ring allows for efficient fluorination.
