= 5-Fluoro-DMT =

Chemical compound

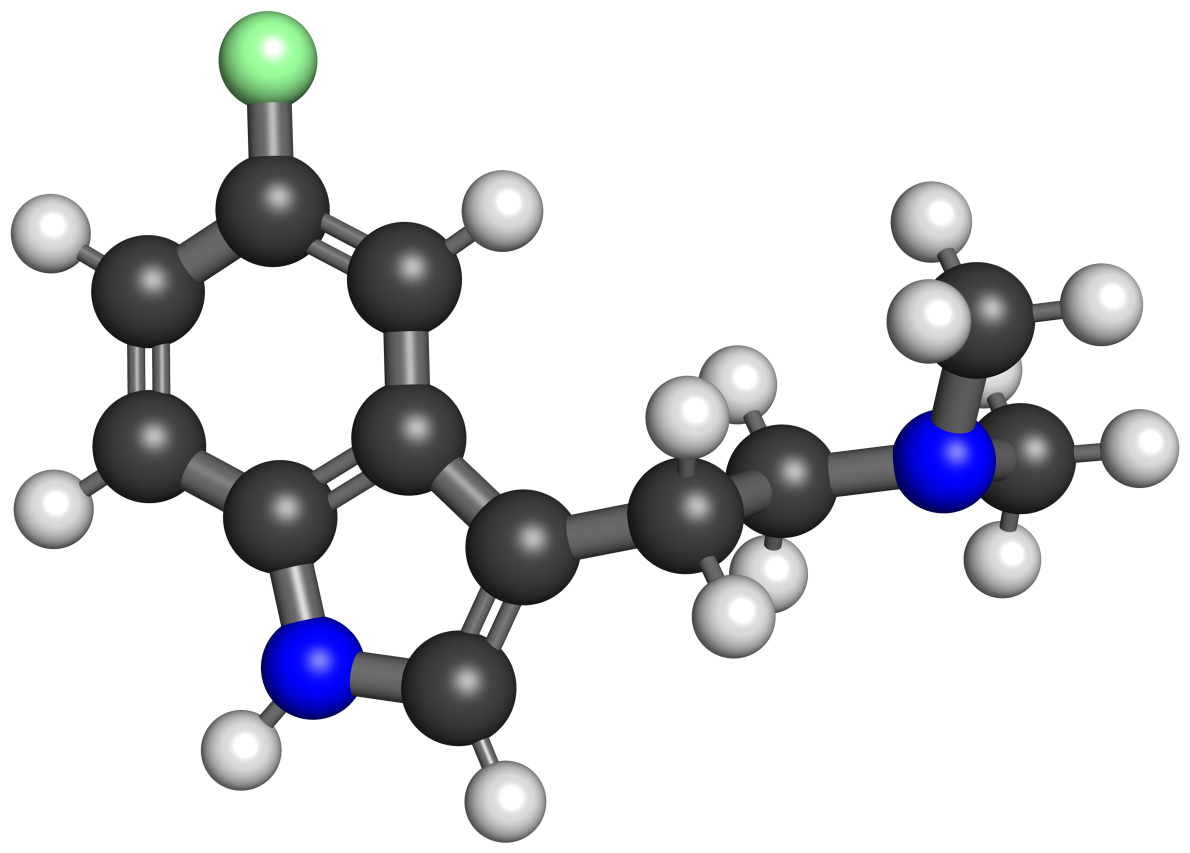

Clinical data
- Other names: 5-F-DMT; 5F-DMT; 5-Fluoro-N,N-dimethyltryptamine
- Drug class: Serotonin receptor agonist; Serotonin 5-HT_{2A} receptor agonist; Serotonergic psychedelic; Hallucinogen

Identifiers
- IUPAC name: 2-(5-fluoro-1H-indol-3-yl)-N,N-dimethylethanamine
- CAS Number: 22120-36-1
- PubChem CID: 2762738
- ChemSpider: 2043436
- UNII: 67P3LCN6RM
- ChEMBL: ChEMBL1630729
- CompTox Dashboard (EPA): DTXSID30376407

Chemical and physical data
- Formula: C_{12}H_{15}FN_{2}
- Molar mass: 206.264 g·mol^{−1}
- 3D model (JSmol): Interactive image
- SMILES: CN(C)CCC1=CNC2=C1C=C(C=C2)F
- InChI: InChI=1S/C12H15FN2/c1-15(2)6-5-9-8-14-12-4-3-10(13)7-11(9)12/h3-4,7-8,14H,5-6H2,1-2H3; Key:BXYDWQABVPBLBU-UHFFFAOYSA-N

5-Fluoro-DMT, or 5-F-DMT, also known as 5-fluoro-N,N-dimethyltryptamine, is a psychedelic drug of the tryptamine family related to dimethyltryptamine (DMT) and to other psychedelic tryptamines like 5-chloro-DMT and 5-bromo-DMT.

== Use and effects ==
5-Fluoro-DMT was not included nor mentioned in Alexander Shulgin's book TiHKAL (Tryptamines I Have Known and Loved). In 2023, Hamilton Morris described 5-fluoro-DMT as being of increased activity relative to dimethyltryptamine (DMT) in contrast to 5-bromo-DMT and 5-chloro-DMT.

== Pharmacology ==
=== Pharmacodynamics ===
5-Fluoro-DMT is known to have affinity for and to act as an agonist of the serotonin 5-HT_{1A} and 5-HT_{2A} receptors. Fluorination of psychedelic tryptamines either reduces or has little effect on serotonin 5-HT_{2A} and 5-HT_{2C} receptor affinity or intrinsic activity, although 6-fluoro-DET is inactive as a psychedelic despite acting as a 5-HT_{2A} agonist (cf. lisuride), while 4-fluoro-5-methoxy-DMT is a much stronger agonist at the serotonin 5-HT_{1A} receptor than at the serotonin 5-HT_{2A} receptor.

5-Fluoro-DMT produces a robust head-twitch response in mice, and hence is a putative serotonergic psychedelic. In another study however, it failed to substitute for LSD in rodent drug discrimination tests, at least at the assessed doses. The drug also produces hypolocomotion and hypothermia in rodents.

== Chemistry ==
=== Analogues ===
Analogues of 5-fluoro-DMT include dimethyltryptamine (DMT), 5-fluorotryptamine (5-fluoro-T), 5-bromo-DMT, 5-chloro-DMT, bretisilocin (5-fluoro-MET), 5-fluoro-DET, 4-fluoro-DMT, 6-fluoro-DMT, 6-fluoro-DET, 4-fluoro-5-methoxy-DMT, 5-fluoro-AMT, 6-fluoro-AMT, and O-4310 (1-iPr-6-F-4-HO-DMT), among others.

== History ==
5-Fluoro-DMT was first described in the scientific literature by Stephen Szára and colleagues by 1966.

== Society and culture ==
=== Legal status ===
==== Canada ====
5-Fluoro-DMT is not an explicitly nor implicitly controlled substance in Canada as of 2025.

==== United States ====
5-Fluoro-DMT is not an explicitly controlled substance in the United States. However, it could be considered a controlled substance under the Federal Analogue Act if intended for human consumption.

== See also ==
- Substituted tryptamine
- GR-159897
- 5-Fluoro-AMT
