= 6-Fluoro-DMT =

Chemical compound

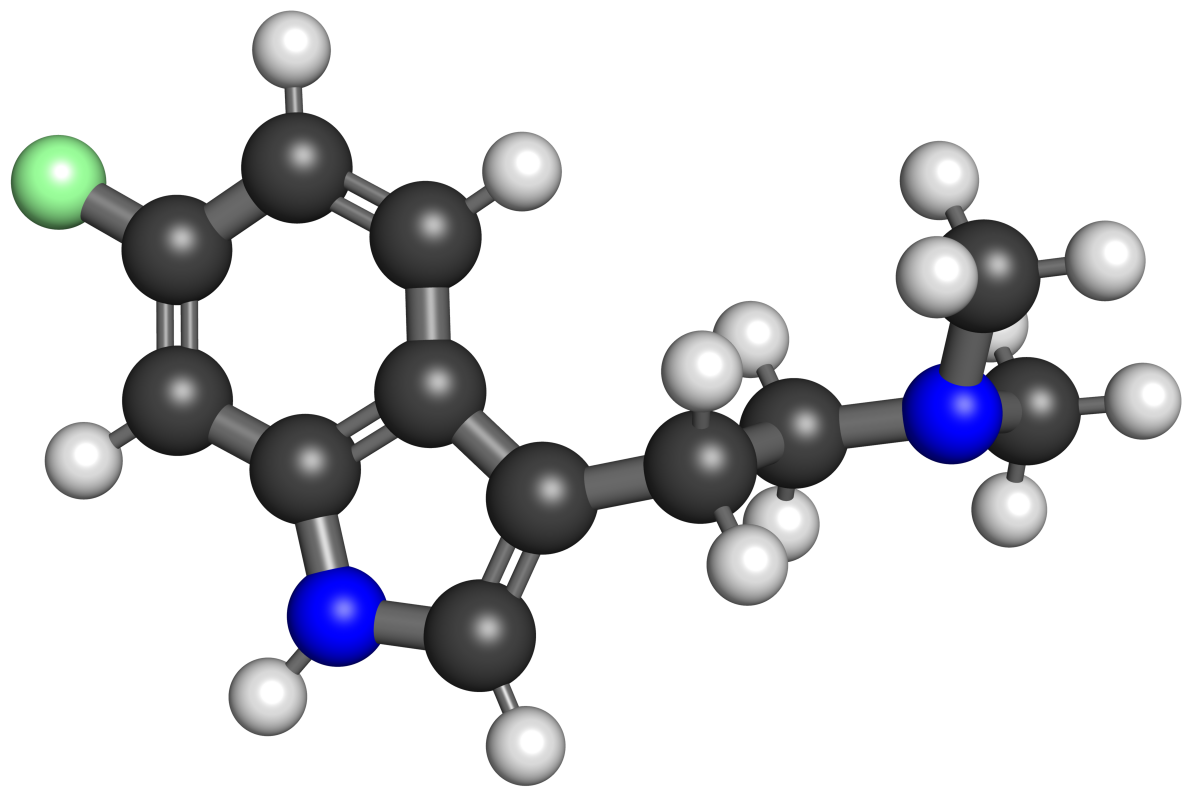

Clinical data
- Other names: 6-Fluoro-N,N-dimethyltryptamine; 6-Fluoro-DMT; 6-F-DMT; 6F-DMT
- Drug class: Serotonin receptor modulator; Serotonin 5-HT_{2A} receptor agonist; Possible psychedelic drug or hallucinogen
- ATC code: None

Identifiers
- IUPAC name: 2-(6-fluoro-1H-indol-3-yl)-N,N-dimethyl-ethanamine
- CAS Number: 1511-31-5
- PubChem CID: 121013343
- ChemSpider: 26286731
- UNII: J4CZH8D9EN

Chemical and physical data
- Formula: C_{12}H_{15}FN_{2}
- Molar mass: 206.264 g·mol^{−1}
- 3D model (JSmol): Interactive image
- SMILES: CN(CCC1=CNC2=C1C=CC(F)=C2)C
- InChI: InChI=1S/C12H15FN2/c1-15(2)6-5-9-8-14-12-7-10(13)3-4-11(9)12/h3-4,7-8,14H,5-6H2,1-2H3; Key:DZXZPVGWRZCXDH-UHFFFAOYSA-N

6-Fluoro-DMT, also known as 6-fluoro-N,N-dimethyltryptamine, is a serotonin receptor modulator and possible psychedelic drug of the tryptamine family related to dimethyltryptamine (DMT).

== Use and effects ==
6-Fluoro-DMT was not included nor mentioned in Alexander Shulgin's book TiHKAL (Tryptamines I Have Known and Loved). However, he did briefly discuss it in an early literature review, but its properties and effects in humans were not described.

The closely related compound 6-fluoro-DET has been found to be inactive in terms of psychedelic-type effects both in animals and humans. Relatedly, it has been claimed that 6-fluoro-DMT is inactive as a psychedelic similarly to 6-fluoro-DET, though it is unclear whether this claim was based on actual testing or on extrapolation from 6-fluoro-DET and theoretical notions. In the 1960s, it had been theorized by Stephen Szára and colleagues that psychedelic tryptamines were prodrugs that required 6-hydroxylation to become hallucinogenic, but this theory was later found to be incorrect.

Indeed, the related compound 6-fluoro-AMT is known to be robustly active as a psychedelic. Additionally, 6-fluoro-DMT robustly induces the head-twitch response, a behavioral proxy of psychedelic effects, in rodents. Likewise, HBL20016 (5-MeS-6-F-DMT), the 5-methylthio derivative of 6-fluoro-DMT, robustly produces the head-twitch response in rodents as well.

== Pharmacology ==
=== Pharmacodynamics ===
6-Fluoro-DMT activities
Target	Affinity (K_{i}, nM)
5-HT_{1A}	693–865 (K_{i}); IA (EC_{50})
5-HT_{1B}	218
5-HT_{1D}	55
5-HT_{1E}	461
5-HT_{1F}	ND
5-HT_{2A}	511–866 (K_{i}); 41–16,830 (EC_{50}); 74% (E_{max})
5-HT_{2B}	30
5-HT_{2C}	674 (K_{i}); 1.252–5.816 (EC_{50}); 105–131% (E_{max})
5-HT_{3}	>10,000
5-HT_{4}	ND
5-HT_{5A}	961
5-HT_{6}	26
5-HT_{7}	41
α_{1A}	173
α_{1B}	>10,000
α_{1D}	ND
α_{2A}	>10,000
α_{2B}	260
α_{2C}	149
β_{1}	>10,000
β_{2}	>10,000
β_{3}	ND
D_{1}	547
D_{2}	610
D_{3}	867
D_{4}	1,454
D_{5}	6,291
H_{1}	47
H_{2}	925
H_{3}, H_{4}	>10,000
M_{1}–M_{5}	>10,000
I_{1}	898
σ_{1}	6,892
σ_{2}	7,128
TAAR1	ND
SERT	145 (K_{i})
NET	>10,000 (K_{i})
DAT	>10,000 (K_{i})
Notes: The smaller the value, the more avidly the drug binds to the site. All proteins are human unless otherwise specified. Refs:

6-Fluoro-DMT is known to possess varying affinities for serotonin receptors, adrenergic receptors, dopamine receptors, histamine receptors, the imidazoline I_{1} receptor, sigma receptors, and the serotonin transporter (SERT). It has been found to be a potent partial agonist of the serotonin 5-HT_{2A} receptor and a potent full agonist of the serotonin 5-HT_{2C} receptor. In another study however, it showed affinity for the serotonin 5-HT_{1A} and 5-HT_{2A} receptors but was inactive as a serotonin 5-HT_{1A} receptor agonist and showed low potency as a serotonin 5-HT_{2A} receptor agonist. On the other hand, it was only about 3-fold less potent than dimethyltryptamine (DMT) as a serotonin 5-HT_{2A} receptor agonist in this study. 6-Fluoro-DMT was less active than DMT in producing effects in early animal studies. It robustly induces the head-twitch response, a behavioral proxy of psychedelic effects, in rodents, with maximal efficacy greater than that of psilocin or 5-MeO-DMT but less than that of DMT.

== Chemistry ==
=== Analogues ===
Analogues of 6-fluoro-DMT include 6-fluorotryptamine, dimethyltryptamine (DMT), 4-fluoro-DMT, 5-fluoro-DMT, 5-fluoro-AMT, 5-bromo-DMT, 5-chloro-DMT, bretisilocin (5-fluoro-MET), 6-fluoro-AMT, 6-fluoro-DET, 6-methyl-DMT, 6-MeO-DMT, 6-hydroxy-DMT, and HBL20016 (5-MeS-6-F-DMT), among others.

== History ==
6-Fluoro-DMT was first described in the scientific literature by at least 1966.

== See also ==
- Substituted tryptamine
- Non-hallucinogenic 5-HT_{2A} receptor agonist
