= 5-Fluorotryptamine =

Clinical data
- Other names: 5-Fluoro-T; 5-FT; 5-F-T; PAL-284; PAL284
- Drug class: Serotonin receptor agonist; Monoamine releasing agent

Identifiers
- IUPAC name: 2-(5-fluoro-1H-indol-3-yl)ethanamine
- CAS Number: 576-16-9 2711-58-2 (hydrochloride)
- PubChem CID: 164682
- IUPHAR/BPS: 146
- ChemSpider: 144367
- UNII: AY99XA22FG
- ChEMBL: ChEMBL275628
- CompTox Dashboard (EPA): DTXSID20206229

Chemical and physical data
- Formula: C_{10}H_{11}FN_{2}
- Molar mass: 178.210 g·mol^{−1}
- 3D model (JSmol): Interactive image
- SMILES: C1=CC2=C(C=C1F)C(=CN2)CCN
- InChI: InChI=1S/C10H11FN2/c11-8-1-2-10-9(5-8)7(3-4-12)6-13-10/h1-2,5-6,13H,3-4,12H2; Key:ZKIORVIXEWIOGB-UHFFFAOYSA-N

5-Fluorotryptamine (5-fluoro-T, 5-FT, or 5-F-T; code name PAL-284) is a serotonin receptor agonist and monoamine releasing agent of the tryptamine family.

== Pharmacology ==
5-FT is known to have affinity for the serotonin 5-HT_{1A} and 5-HT_{2A} receptors, with K_{i} values of 18 nM and 6.0–3,908 nM, respectively. It is a full agonist of the serotonin 5-HT_{2A} receptor, with an EC_{50} of 2.64 to 58 nM and an E_{max} of 110%. The drug is also an agonist of the serotonin 5-HT_{1A} receptor, with an EC_{50} of 129 nM. 5-HT shows high affinity for the serotonin 5-HT_{2B} and 5-HT_{2C} receptors as well (K_{i} = 5.7 nM and 3.72 nM, respectively). In addition to its serotonin receptor agonism, 5-FT is a serotonin–dopamine releasing agent (SDRA), with EC_{50} values for induction of monoamine release of 10.1 nM for serotonin, 82.3 nM for dopamine, and 464 nM for norepinephrine. The drug is also a weak monoamine oxidase inhibitor (MAOI), with IC_{50} values of 13,200 nM for monoamine oxidase A (MAO-A) and 52,500 nM for monoamine oxidase B (MAO-B).

Despite its serotonin 5-HT_{2A} receptor agonism, 5-FT fails to induce the head-twitch response, a behavioral proxy of psychedelic effects, in rodents, suggesting that it may not have hallucinogenic effects in humans.

Tryptamines without substitutions at the amine or alpha carbon, such as tryptamine, serotonin (5-hydroxytryptamine; 5-HT), and 5-methoxytryptamine (5-MeO-T), are known to be very rapidly metabolized and thereby inactivated by monoamine oxidase A (MAO-A) in vivo and to have very short elimination half-lives. However, given intravenously at sufficiently high doses, tryptamine is still known to be able to produce weak and short-lived psychoactive effects in humans.

== History ==
5-FT was first described in the scientific literature by 1983.

== See also ==
- Substituted tryptamine
- 5-Chlorotryptamine
- 5-Bromotryptamine
- 6-Fluorotryptamine (6-FT)
- 7-Chlorotryptamine (7-CT)
- 5-Fluoro-AMT
- 5-Fluoro-AET
- 5-Fluoro-DMT
- 5-Fluoro-DET
- Bretisilocin (5-fluoro-MET)
- 5-Fluoro-EPT
- 5-Methyltryptamine
- 5-Methoxytryptamine
