= 6-Bromotryptamine =

Chemical compound

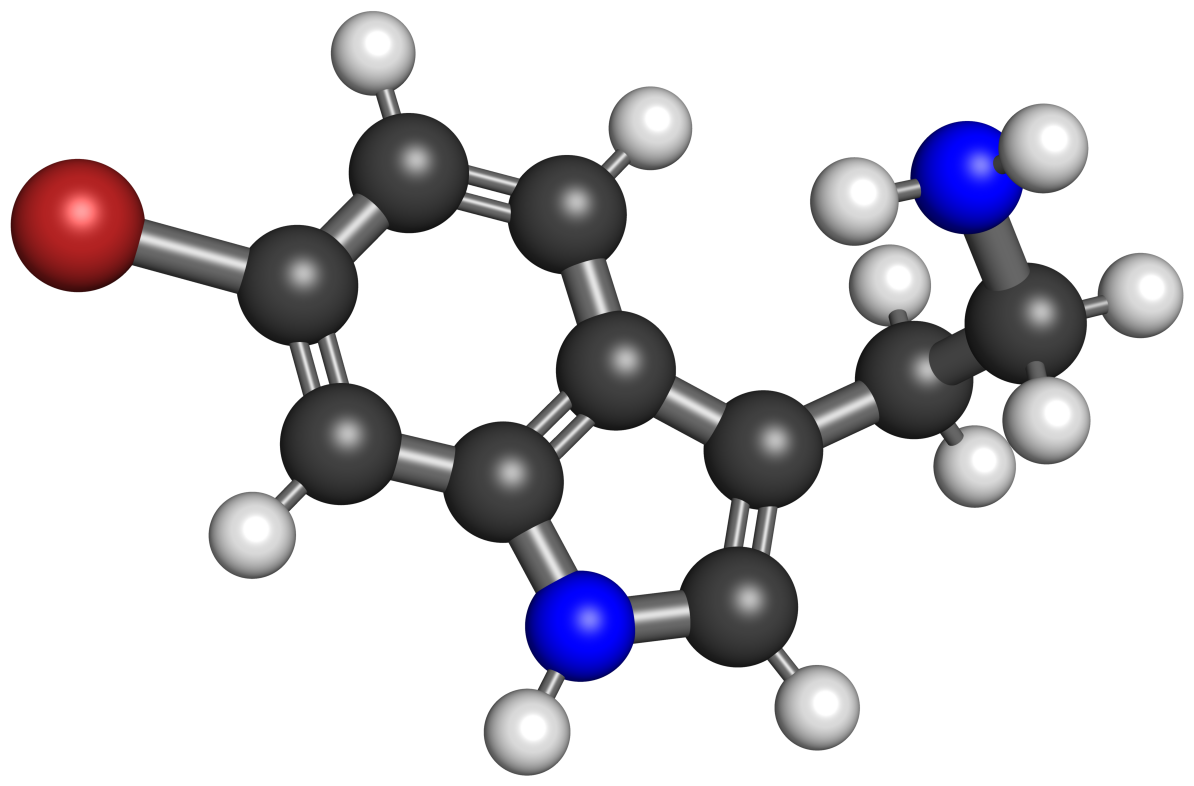

Clinical data
- Other names: 2-(6-Bromo-1H-indol-3-yl)ethanamine; Ethanamine, 2-(6-bromo-1H-indol-3-yl)-

Identifiers
- IUPAC name: 2-(6-bromo-1H-indol-3-yl)ethanamine
- CAS Number: 96624-18-9
- PubChem CID: 180714
- ChemSpider: 157253
- ChEMBL: ChEMBL3799071
- CompTox Dashboard (EPA): DTXSID10242378

Chemical and physical data
- Formula: C_{10}H_{11}BrN_{2}
- Molar mass: 239.116 g·mol^{−1}
- 3D model (JSmol): Interactive image
- SMILES: C1=CC2=C(C=C1Br)NC=C2CCN
- InChI: InChI=1S/C10H11BrN2/c11-8-1-2-9-7(3-4-12)6-13-10(9)5-8/h1-2,5-6,13H,3-4,12H2; Key:JMJWBINWUCHDRO-UHFFFAOYSA-N

6-Bromotryptamine is a substituted tryptamine that is a marine natural product.

== See also ==
- Substituted tryptamine
- 5,6-Dibromotryptamine
- 5,6-Dibromo-N-methyltryptamine
- 5-Bromo-DMT
