= 6-Hydroxy-DMT =

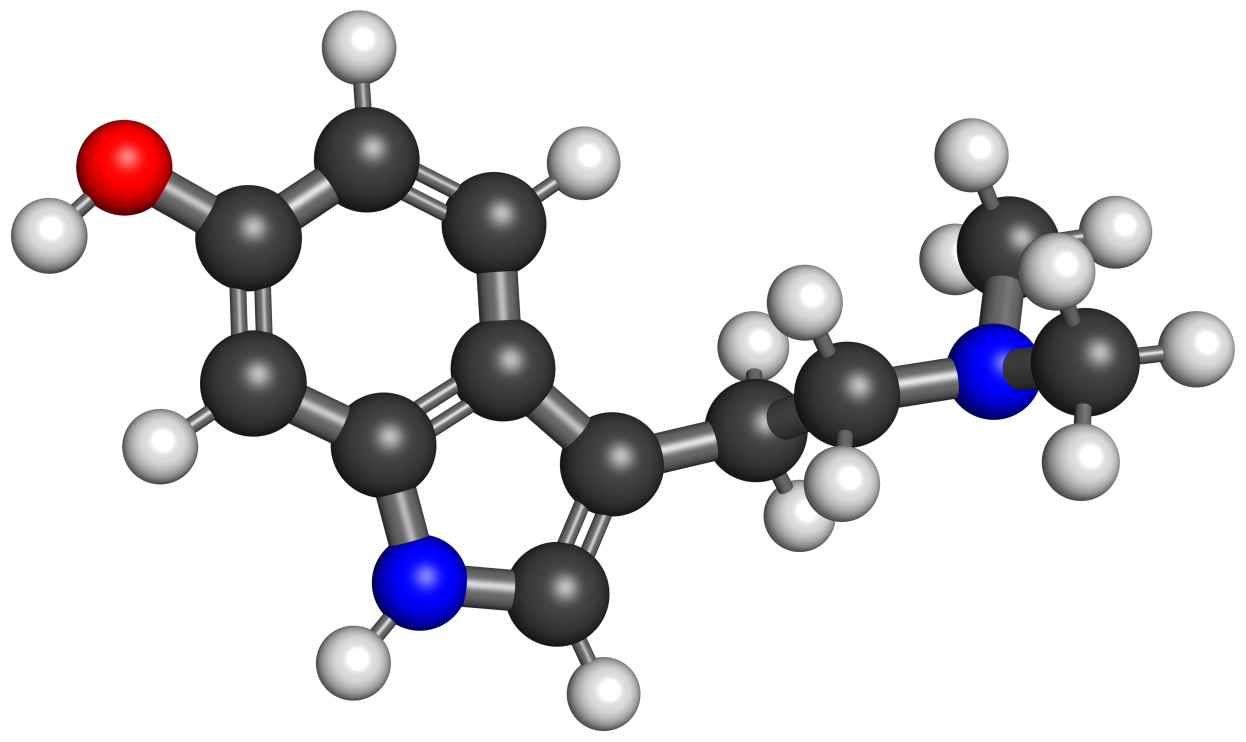

Clinical data
- Other names: 6-HDMT; 6-HO-DMT; 6-OH-DMT; 6-Hydroxy-N,N-dimethyltryptamine
- Drug class: Serotonin receptor modulator
- ATC code: None

Identifiers
- IUPAC name: 3-[2-(dimethylamino)ethyl]-1H-indol-6-ol
- CAS Number: 1476-33-1
- PubChem CID: 15124
- ChemSpider: 14396
- ChEMBL: ChEMBL382750
- CompTox Dashboard (EPA): DTXSID70163752

Chemical and physical data
- Formula: C_{12}H_{16}N_{2}O
- Molar mass: 204.273 g·mol^{−1}
- 3D model (JSmol): Interactive image
- SMILES: CN(C)CCC1=CNC2=C1C=CC(=C2)O
- InChI: InChI=1S/C12H16N2O/c1-14(2)6-5-9-8-13-12-7-10(15)3-4-11(9)12/h3-4,7-8,13,15H,5-6H2,1-2H3; Key:WUQMRWPLIMXBDX-UHFFFAOYSA-N

6-Hydroxy-DMT, or 6-HO-DMT, also known as 6-hydroxy-N,N-dimethyltryptamine, is a serotonin receptor modulator of the tryptamine family related to the psychedelic drug dimethyltryptamine (DMT). It is a major metabolite of DMT in rodents but a minor metabolite of DMT in humans. The drug is the 6-hydroxy analogue of DMT and is a positional isomer of bufotenin (5-HO-DMT) and psilocin (4-HO-DMT).

== Use and effects ==
6-Hydroxy-DMT was completely inactive in terms of psychoactive and autonomic effects at doses of 0.75 to 1 mg/kg (~53–70 mg for a 70-kb person) by intramuscular injection in humans. The drug was said to be indistinguishable from placebo. Conversely, DMT produced strong hallucinogenic effects at the same doses.

== Pharmacology ==
Although it was inactive as a psychedelic in humans, 6-hydroxy-DMT has been found to produce pharmacological effects in animals, albeit with diminished potency compared to dimethyltryptamine (DMT). As examples, in terms of behavioral effects, 6-hydroxy-DMT was ≥3-fold less potent in rats, >10-fold less potent in cats, and 3-fold less potent in monkeys. It was suggested by Richard Glennon and colleagues that the reduced activity of 6-hydroxy-DMT may be due to its greater hydrophilicity and reduced ability to penetrate the blood–brain barrier analogously to the case of bufotenin.

Subsequent research assessed 6-hydroxy-DMT at the serotonin receptors in vitro. It was found to have detectable but very low affinity for the serotonin 5-HT_{2} receptors (K_{i} ≥ 6,300–19,000 nM).

== Chemistry ==
=== Properties ===
The predicted log P of 6-HO-DMT is 2.4. For comparison, the predicted log P of psilocin (4-HO-DMT) is 2.1 and of bufotenin (5-HO-DMT) is 1.2.

=== Analogues ===
Analogues of 6-hydroxy-DMT include 6-hydroxytryptamine (6-HT or 6-HO-T), dimethyltryptamine (DMT), 6-HO-DMT, 6-MeO-DMT, 5,6-MDO-DMT, 6-methyl-DMT, and 6-fluoro-DMT, among others.

== History ==
6-Hydroxy-DMT was first described in the scientific literature by at least 1962.

== Society and culture ==
=== Legal status ===
==== United States ====
6-Hydroxy-DMT is a Schedule I controlled substance in the United States as a positional isomer of psilocin.

== See also ==
- Substituted tryptamine
- 13-Hydroxy-LSD
