= 6-MeO-DMT =

Non-hallucinogenic 5-HT2A agonist

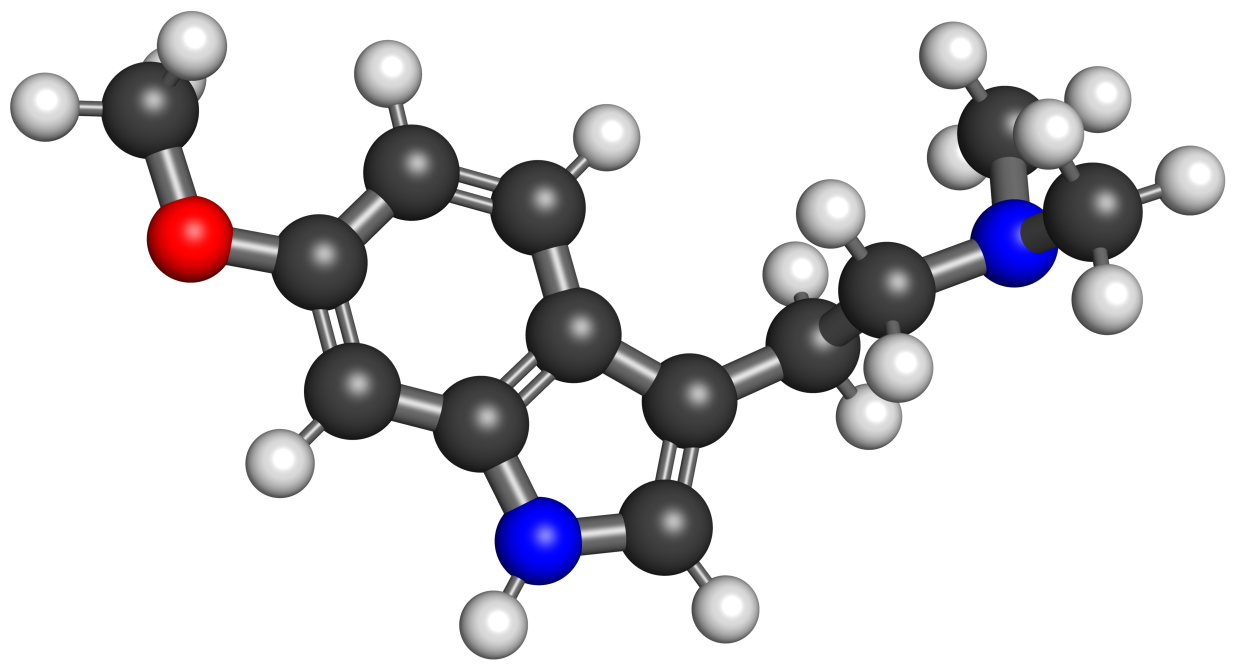

Clinical data
- Other names: 6-Methoxy-N,N-dimethyltryptamine; 6-Methoxy-DMT; 6-Methoxy-N,N-DMT; 6-OMe-DMT
- Drug class: Serotonin receptor agonist; Non-hallucinogenic serotonin 5-HT_{2A} receptor agonist

Identifiers
- IUPAC name: 2-(6-methoxy-1H-indol-3-yl)-N,N-dimethylethanamine
- CAS Number: 2426-88-2
- PubChem CID: 12017579
- ChemSpider: 23118889
- ChEMBL: ChEMBL281408

Chemical and physical data
- Formula: C_{13}H_{18}N_{2}O
- Molar mass: 218.300 g·mol^{−1}
- 3D model (JSmol): Interactive image
- SMILES: CN(C)CCC1=CNC2=C1C=CC(=C2)OC
- InChI: InChI=1S/C13H18N2O/c1-15(2)7-6-10-9-14-13-8-11(16-3)4-5-12(10)13/h4-5,8-9,14H,6-7H2,1-3H3; Key:AWOWBKXVYZRYSP-UHFFFAOYSA-N

6-MeO-DMT, or 6-methoxy-N,N-dimethyltryptamine, also known as 6-OMe-DMT, is a serotonergic drug of the tryptamine family. It is the 6-methoxy derivative of the serotonergic psychedelic N,N-dimethyltryptamine (DMT) and is a positional isomer of the psychedelic 5-MeO-DMT.

== Use and effects ==
6-MeO-DMT was only briefly mentioned in Alexander Shulgin's book TiHKAL (Tryptamines I Have Known and Loved) and its properties and effects were not described.

== Pharmacology ==
=== Pharmacodynamics ===
Similarly to analogues like DMT and 5-MeO-DMT, 6-MeO-DMT acts as a serotonin 5-HT_{2A} receptor agonist as well as a non-selective agonist of many other serotonin receptors. However, in contrast to these agents, but similarly to certain other serotonin 5-HT_{2A} receptor agonists like 6-fluoro-DET, 2-bromo-LSD, lisuride, 25N-N1-Nap, and tabernanthalog, 6-MeO-DMT does not produce the head-twitch response (HTR) or other psychedelic-like effects in animals and hence appears to be non-hallucinogenic. Similarly, 6-MeO-DMT failed to substitute for DOM in rodent drug discrimination tests. On the other hand, it did substitute for the atypical psychedelic 5-MeO-DMT in rodent drug discrimination tests, with about 4-fold lower potency than 5-MeO-DMT. 6-MeO-DMT has yet to be tested in humans.

In addition to its apparent lack of hallucinogenicity, 6-MeO-DMT shows dramatically reduced potency as an agonist of all of the serotonin receptors compared to 5-MeO-DMT. Its affinity for the serotonin 5-HT_{2A} receptor was 12- to 43-fold lower than that of 5-MeO-DMT and was 6-fold lower than that of DMT and its affinity for the serotonin 5-HT_{1A} receptor was 110-fold lower relative to 5-MeO-DMT.

== Chemistry ==
=== Analogues ===
Analogues of 6-MeO-DMT include DMT (dimethyltryptamine), 6-MeO-T (6-MT or 6-methoxytryptamine), 6-HO-DMT (6-hydroxy-DMT), 6-methyl-DMT, 6-fluoro-DMT, 6-TFMO-DMT, 4-MeO-DMT, 5-MeO-DMT, and 7-MeO-DMT, among others. Some further analogues include the isotryptamines 5-MeO-isoDMT, 6-MeO-isoDMT, and zalsupindole ((R)-5-MeO-α-Me-isoDMT).

== History ==
6-MeO-DMT was first described in the scientific literature by 1968. It was specifically assessed in a structure–activity relationship (SAR) animal study of serotonergic tryptamines. The drug's lack of hallucinogen-like effects in animals was first described by at least 1983.

== Society and culture ==
=== Legal status ===
==== United States ====
6-MeO-DMT is not an explicitly controlled substance in the United States, but may be considered a Schedule I controlled substance in this country as it is a positional isomer of 5-MeO-DMT.

== See also ==
- Substituted tryptamine
- Non-hallucinogenic 5-HT_{2A} receptor agonist
