= Stephen Szára =

Hungarian chemist and psychiatrist (1923–2021)

Stephen István Szára
- Born: March 21, 1923; Pestújhely, Hungary
- Died: August 1, 2021 (aged 98); Kensington, Maryland
- Occupations: Chemist and psychiatrist

Stephen István Szára (March 21, 1923 – August 1, 2021) was a Hungarian–American chemist and psychiatrist who made major contributions in the field of pharmacology.

== Life in Hungary ==
Szára was born in Pestújhely, Hungary in March 1923. He earned his DSc and MD from Budapest University of Medicine. Szára organized a Laboratory of Biochemistry at Lipótmezõ in Budapest in 1953 and was also previously an assistant professor at the Department of Biochemistry of the Medical School there.

Szára discovered the hallucinogenic effects of the psychedelic drug dimethyltryptamine (DMT) via self-experimentation in 1956 following its published isolation from cohoba (yopo) snuff the previous year. Szára described experiencing intense euphoria at the higher DMT doses due to his excitement about the discovery. Subsequent to his own experiences, Szára conducted and published a clinical study of DMT's effects that same year. Szára had turned his attention to DMT after his order for LSD from the Swiss company Sandoz Laboratories was rejected on the grounds that the powerful psychotropic could be dangerous in the hands of a communist country.

== Move to the United States ==
Shortly after the Hungarian Revolution in 1956, Szára left Hungary and moved to the United States where he eventually became Chief of the Biomedical Branch of the U.S. National Institute on Drug Abuse. In the U.S., he worked with Julius Axelrod and others on the metabolism of DMT and related compounds in healthy and schizophrenic volunteers. Among other achievements, Szára and his colleagues characterized the biochemistry of the first three psychedelic congeners of tryptamine: dimethyl-, diethyl-, and dipropyl-tryptamine (DMT, DET, and DPT), describing their pharmacokinetics and effects.

Szára's research explored both the possibility that some tryptamines (DMT, in particular) might contribute to psychosis by forming in the brain as well as the possibility that some psychedelics might be useful in psychotherapy. Later, Szára had argued that psychedelic drugs should be studied in a heuristic manner and that learning the mechanisms by which they affect the brain may "serve as keys to unlock the mysteries of the brain/mind relationship".

Szára was an emeritus Fellow of the American College of Neuropsychopharmacology and Collegium Internationale Neuro-Psychopharmacologicum, and a member of the Scientific Advisory Board of the Heffter Research Institute. He was elected Honorary Member of the Hungarian Association of Psychopharmacology in 2007. He was also the recipient of the Alcohol, Drug Abuse, and Mental Health Administration Administrator's Meritorious Achievement Award and the Kovats Medal of Freedom from the American Hungarian Federation (2005).

== Death ==
He died in Kensington, Maryland, in August 2021 at the age of 98.

== See also ==
- List of psychedelic chemists
