= C12H15BrN2 =

The molecular formula C_{12}H_{15}BrN_{2} (molar mass: 267.17 g/mol) may refer to:

- 4-Bromo-DMT
- 5-Bromo-DMT
