= C12H14N2O2 =

The molecular formula C_{12}H_{14}N_{2}O_{2} (molar mass : 218.25 g/mol, exact mass : 218.105528) may refer to:

- Mephenytoin
- Methyltryptophan
  - 1-Methyltryptophan
  - α-Methyltryptophan
  - Abrine, N-Methyltryptophan
- MRZ-9547
- Normelatonin
- Phenylpiracetam
- Primidone
- Rogletimide
