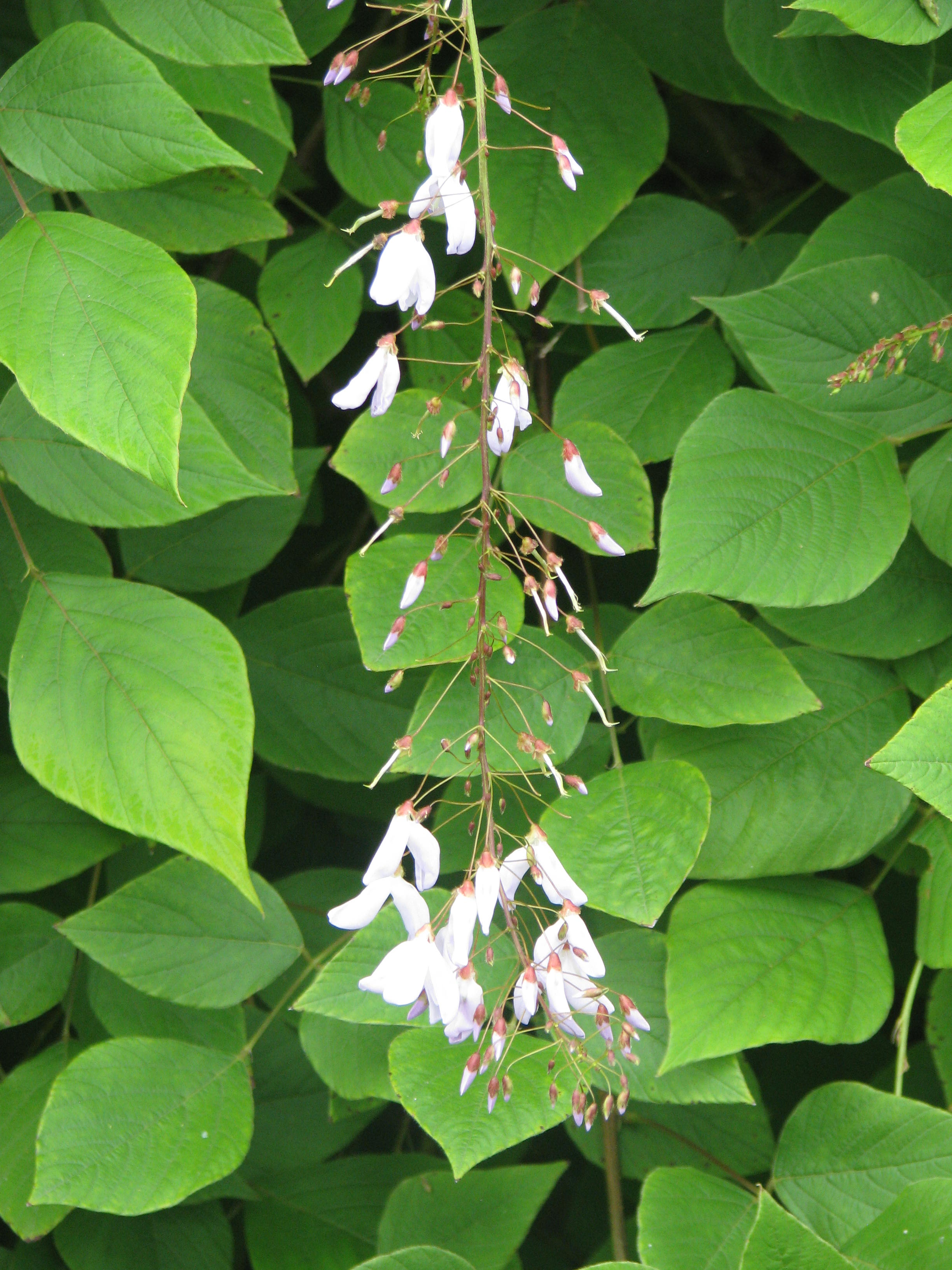

Conservation status
- Least Concern (IUCN 3.1)

Scientific classification
- Kingdom: Plantae
- Clade: Tracheophytes
- Clade: Angiosperms
- Clade: Eudicots
- Clade: Rosids
- Order: Fabales
- Family: Fabaceae
- Genus: Sunhangia
- Species: S. elegans

Binomial name
- Sunhangia elegans (DC.) H.Ohashi & K.Ohashi

Varieties
- Sunhangia elegans var. elegans; Sunhangia elegans var. handelii (Schindl.) H.Ohashi & K.Ohashi; Sunhangia elegans var. nutans (Graham) H.Ohashi & K.Ohashi

Synonyms
- Desmodium elegans DC.; Meibomia elegans (DC.) Kuntze; Ototropis elegans (DC.) H.Ohashi & K.Ohashi

= Sunhangia elegans =

Species of plant

Sunhangia elegans (formerly Ototropis elegans) is a shrub in the pea family (Fabaceae). It is found in Asia (Afghanistan, Bhutan, China, India, Kashmir, Nepal, Pakistan). Infraspecific taxa include:

- Sunhangia elegans var. elegans
- Sunhangia elegans var. handelii
- Sunhangia elegans var. nutans
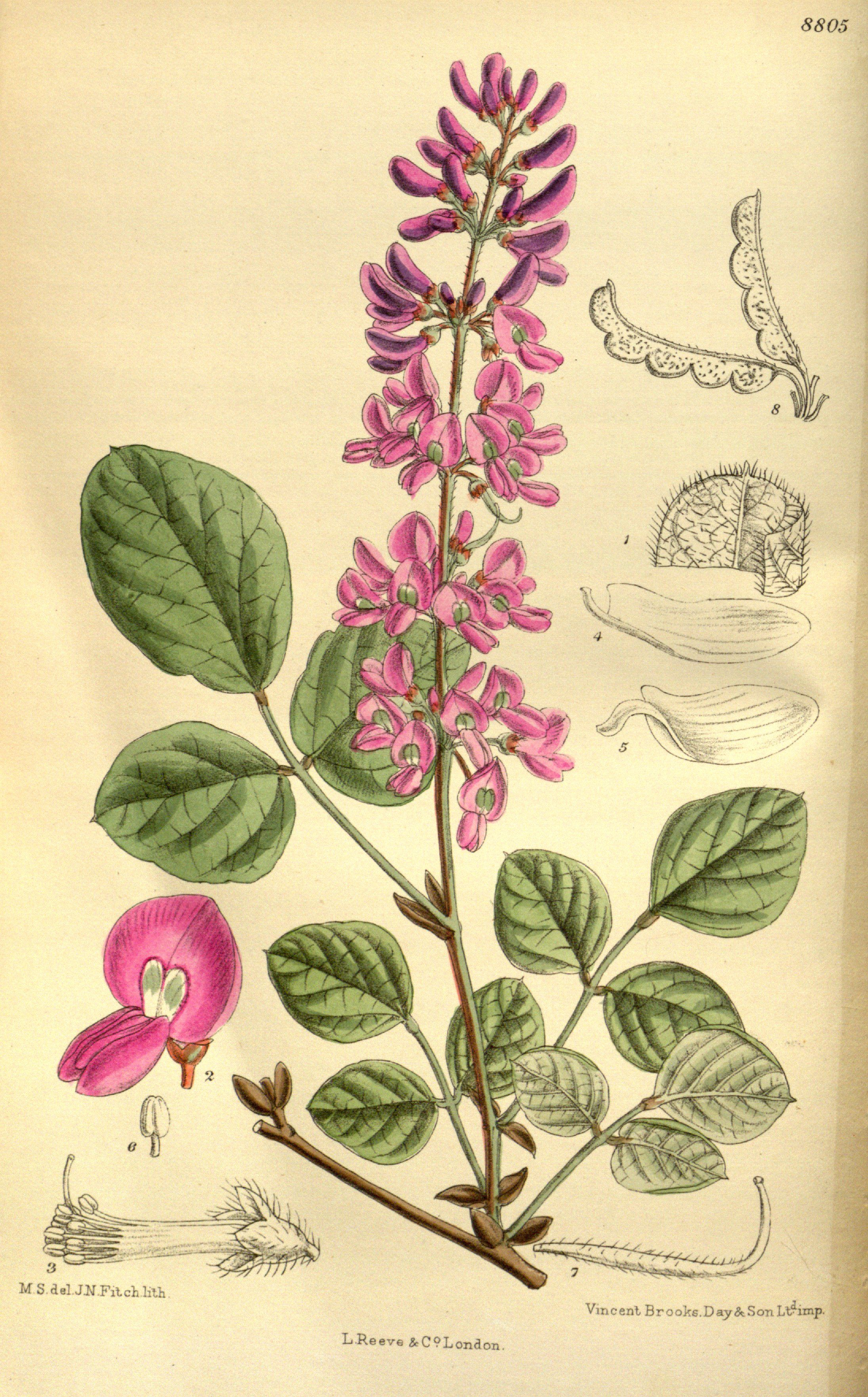

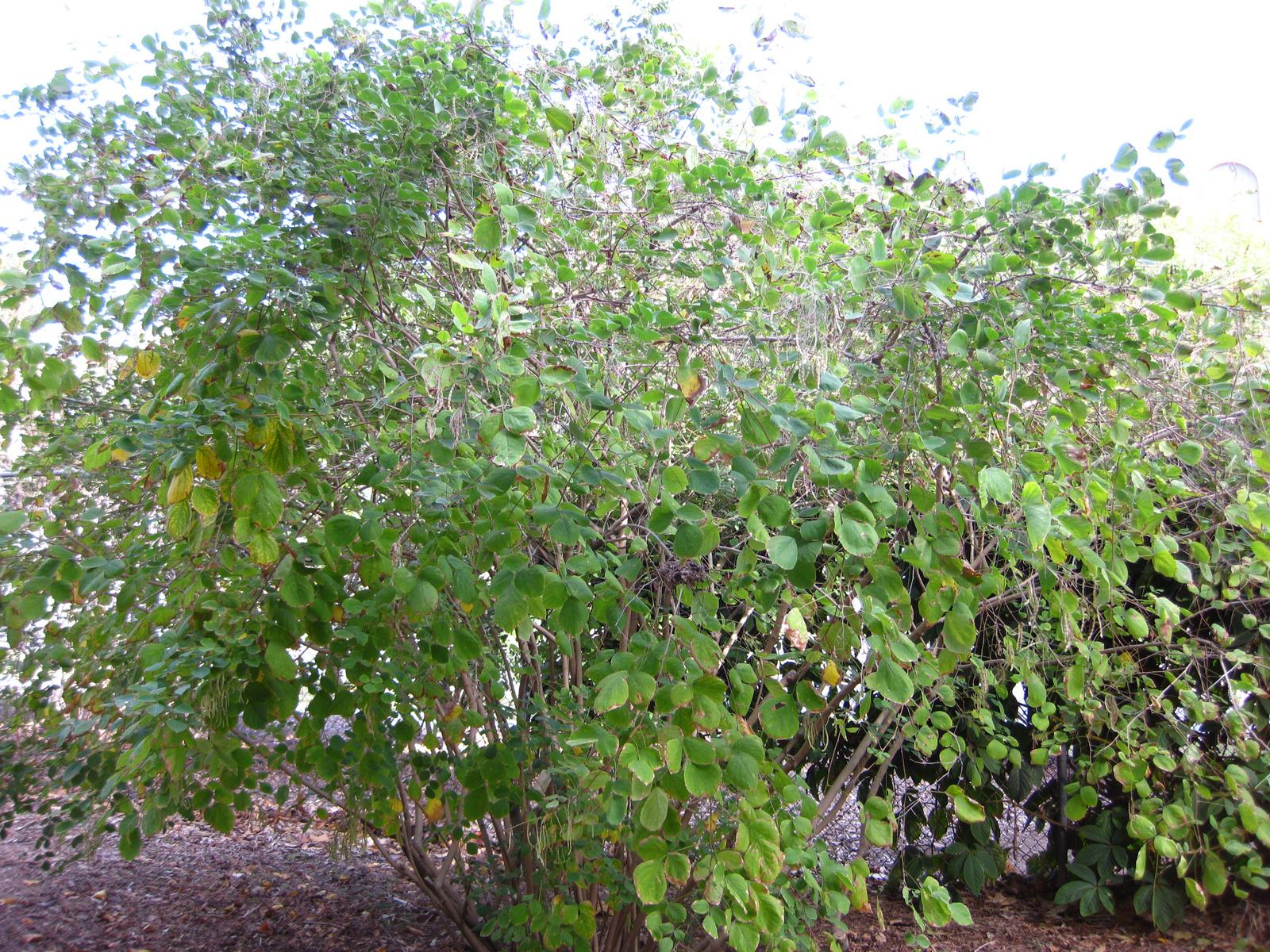

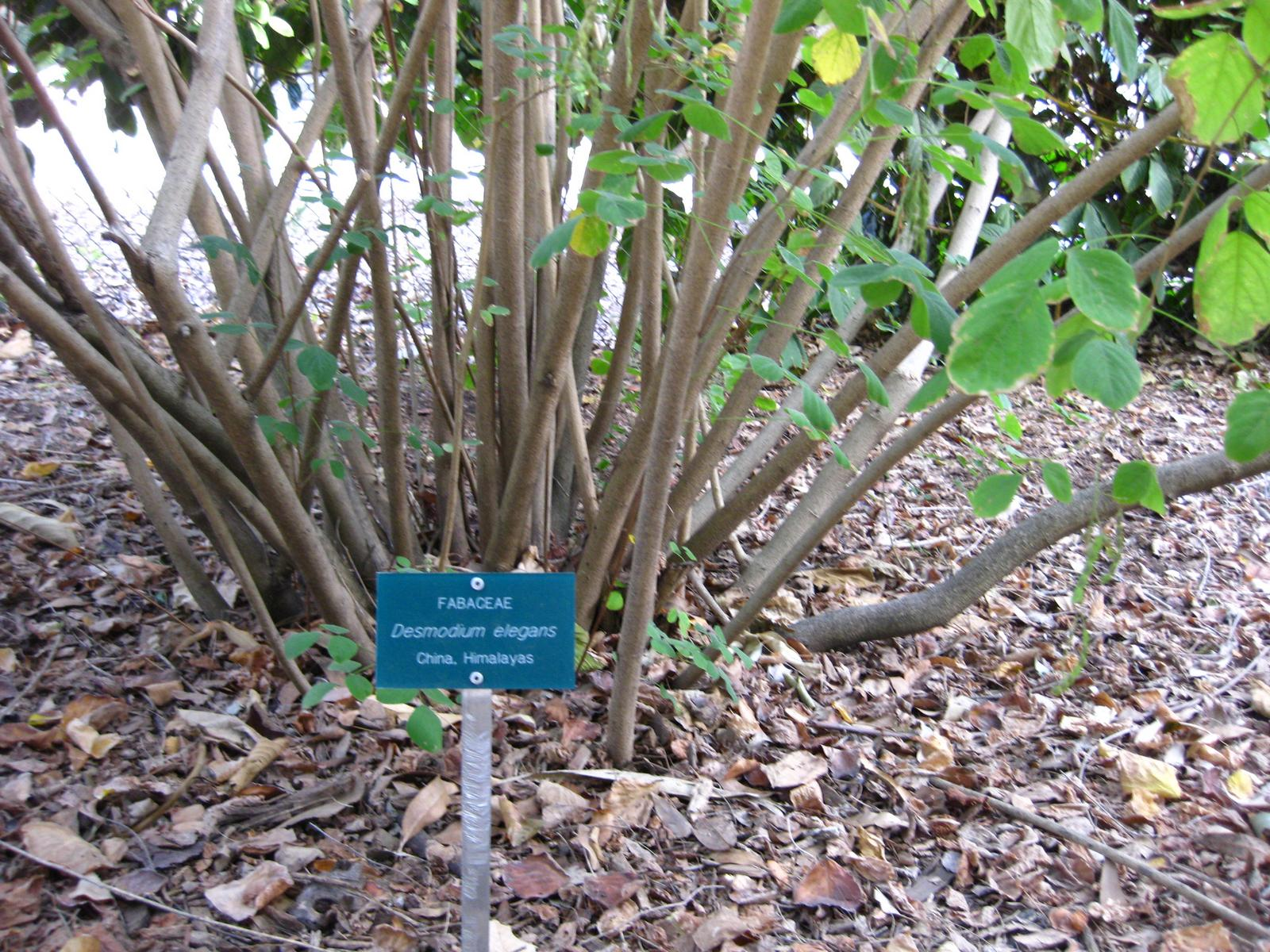

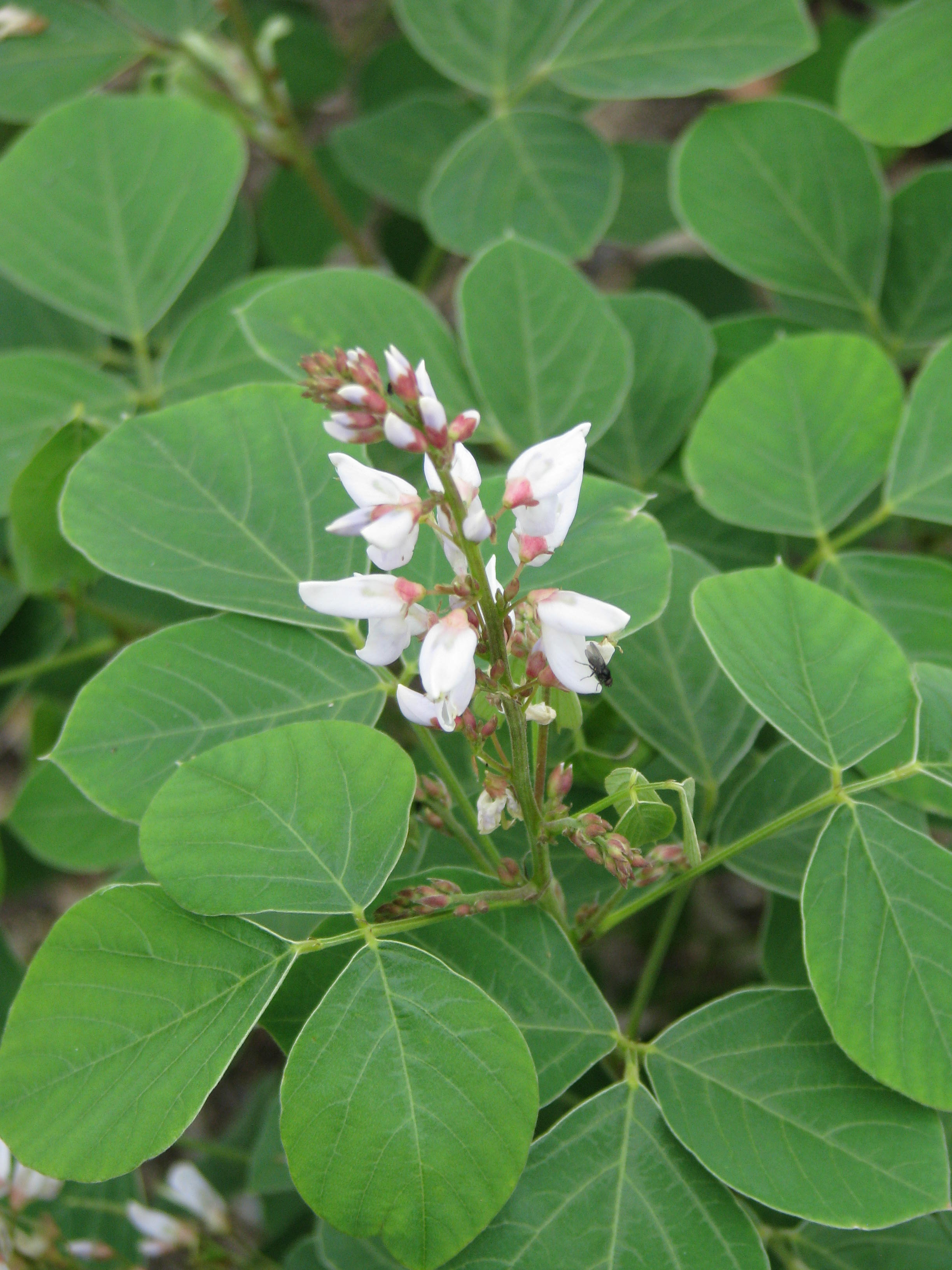
White morph

== Phytochemistry ==
Contains hordenine, 3,4-dimethoxyphenethylamine, N,N-methyl-3,4-dimethoxyphenethylamine, normacromerine, salsolin, salsolidine, tryptamine, abrine, hypaphorine.
