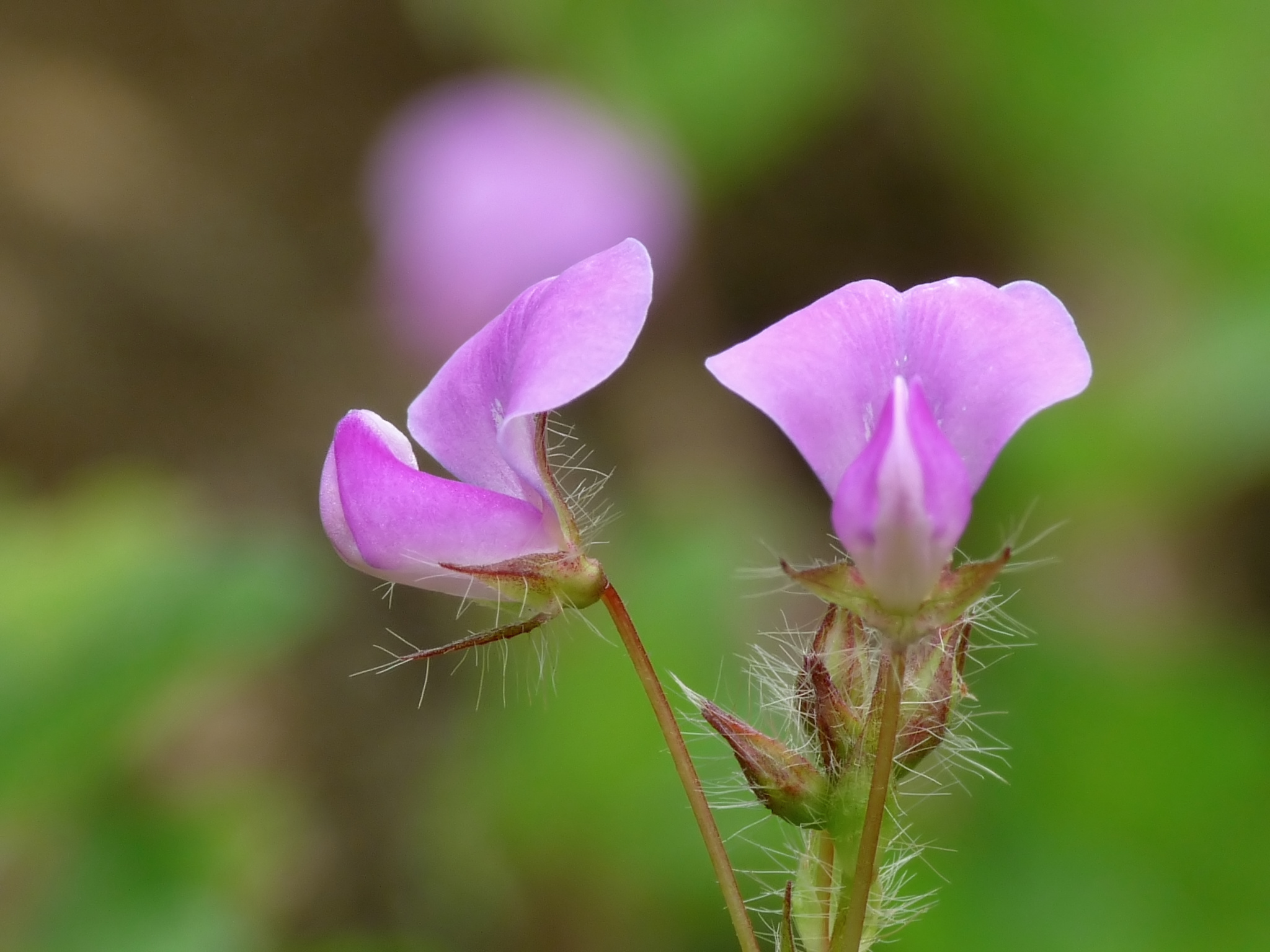
- Inflorescence in Kerala

Conservation status
- Secure (NatureServe)

Scientific classification
- Kingdom: Plantae
- Clade: Tracheophytes
- Clade: Angiosperms
- Clade: Eudicots
- Clade: Rosids
- Order: Fabales
- Family: Fabaceae
- Subfamily: Faboideae
- Genus: Grona
- Species: G. triflora

Binomial name
- Grona triflora (L.) H.Ohashi & K.Ohashi

Synonyms
- Synonymy: Aeschynomene triflora (L.) Poir.; Desmodium albiflorum Cordem., nom. illeg. homonym. post.; Desmodium bullamense G.Don; Desmodium granulatum (Schumach. & Thonn.) Walp.; Desmodium stipulaceum (Burm.f.) Hassk., nom. illeg. homonym. post.; Desmodium triflorum (L.) DC.; Desmodium triflorum var. adpressum Ohwi; Desmodium triflorum var. minimus Stehlé; Desmodium triflorum var. minus Wight & Arn.; Desmodium triflorum var. pygmaeum Hoehne; Desmodium triflorum var. villosum Wight & Arn.; Hedysarum biflorum P.Willemet; Hedysarum granulatum Schumach. & Thonn.; Hedysarum granuliferum Biehler, orth. var.; Hedysarum stipulaceum Burm.f.; Hedysarum triflorum L.; Hippocrepis humilis Blanco; Meibomia triflora (L.) Kuntze; Meibomia triflora f. coerulescens Kuntze; Meibomia triflora f. flavescens Kuntze; Meibomia triflora var. glabrescens Kuntze; Meibomia triflora var. pilosa Kuntze; Meibomia triflora f. purpurea Kuntze; Meibomia triflora f. violacea Kuntze; Meibomia triflora f. violacea Kuntze; Meibomia triflora f. virescens Kuntze; Nicolsonia reptans Meisn.; Nicolsonia triflora (L.) Griseb.; Onobrychis heterophylla Schrank ex Steud.; Pleurolobus triflorus (L.) J.St.-Hil.; Sagotia triflora (L.) Duchass. & Walp.

= Grona triflora =

Species of legume

Grona triflora, also known as Desmodium triflorum, creeping tick trefoil, or three-flower beggarweed, is a plant in the family Fabaceae. It is native to tropical regions around the globe and introduced to subtropical regions including the southern United States.

== Phytochemicals ==
Grona triflora contains alkaloids including N,N-dimethyltryptophan methyl ester, dimethyltryptamine-N-oxide, hypaphorine (structurally related to plakohypaphorine), phenylethylamine, hordenine, tyramine, and trigonelline.

== Medicinal applications and qualities ==
Creeping tick trefoil has been utilized in folk medicine. Conditions it has been used for include wounds, diarrhea, rheumatism, dysentery, and skin diseases.

Known substances found in trefoils include alkaloids and flavonoids. The entire plant is used in human nutritional treatment.

== Agricultural applications ==
Creeping tick trefoil is used in agriculture similarly to the closely related Desmodium; see Desmodium#uses.

== Gallery ==
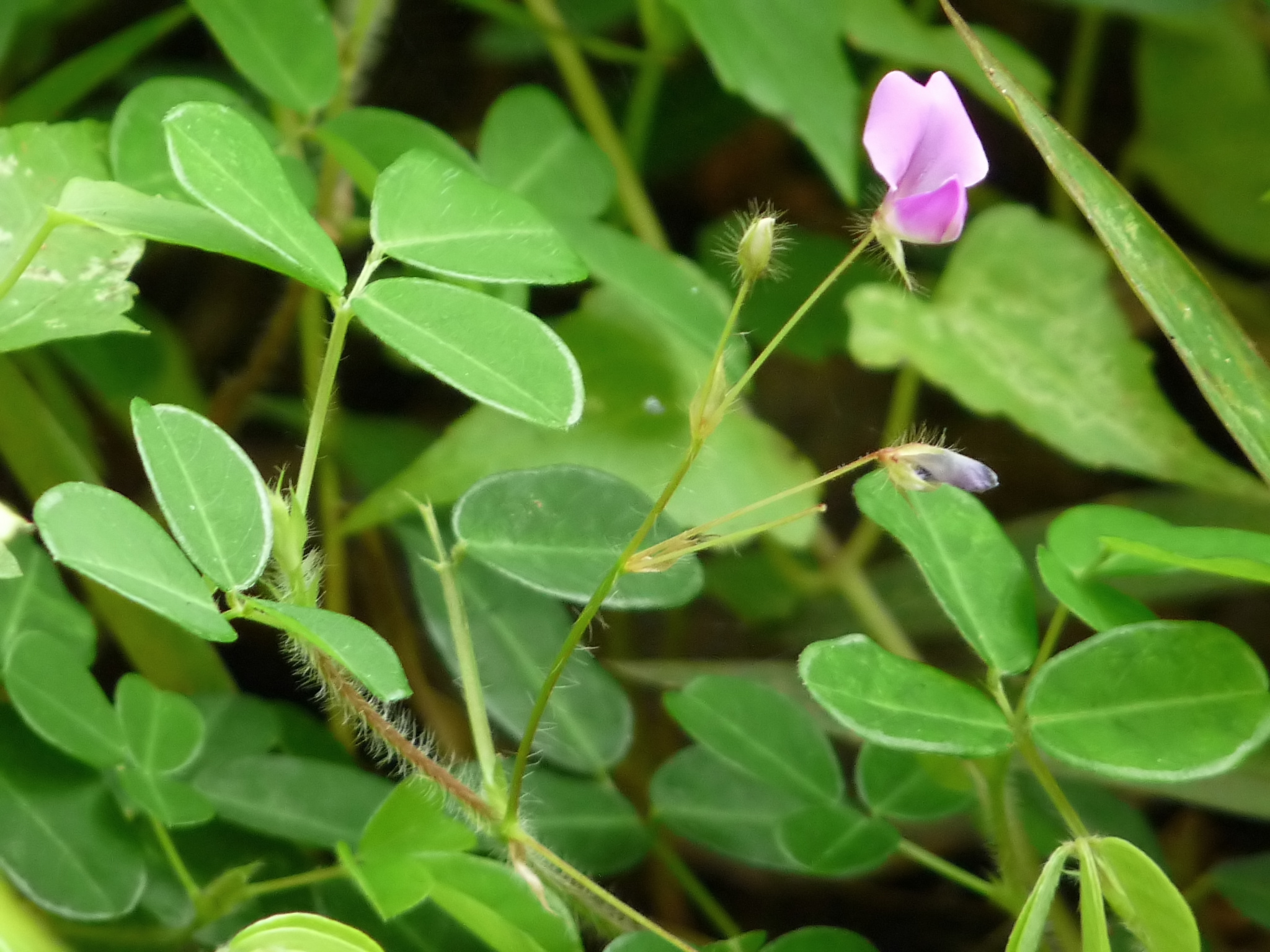
Foliage

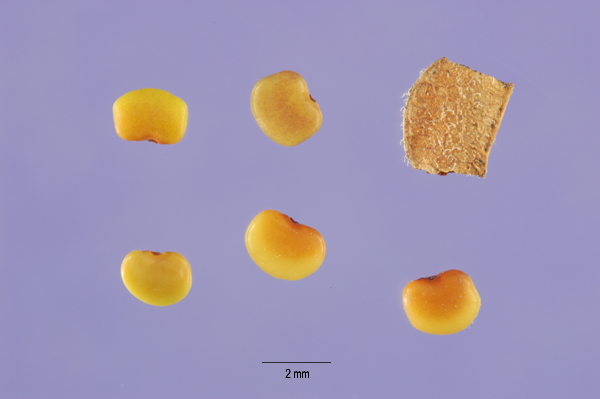
Fruit and seeds

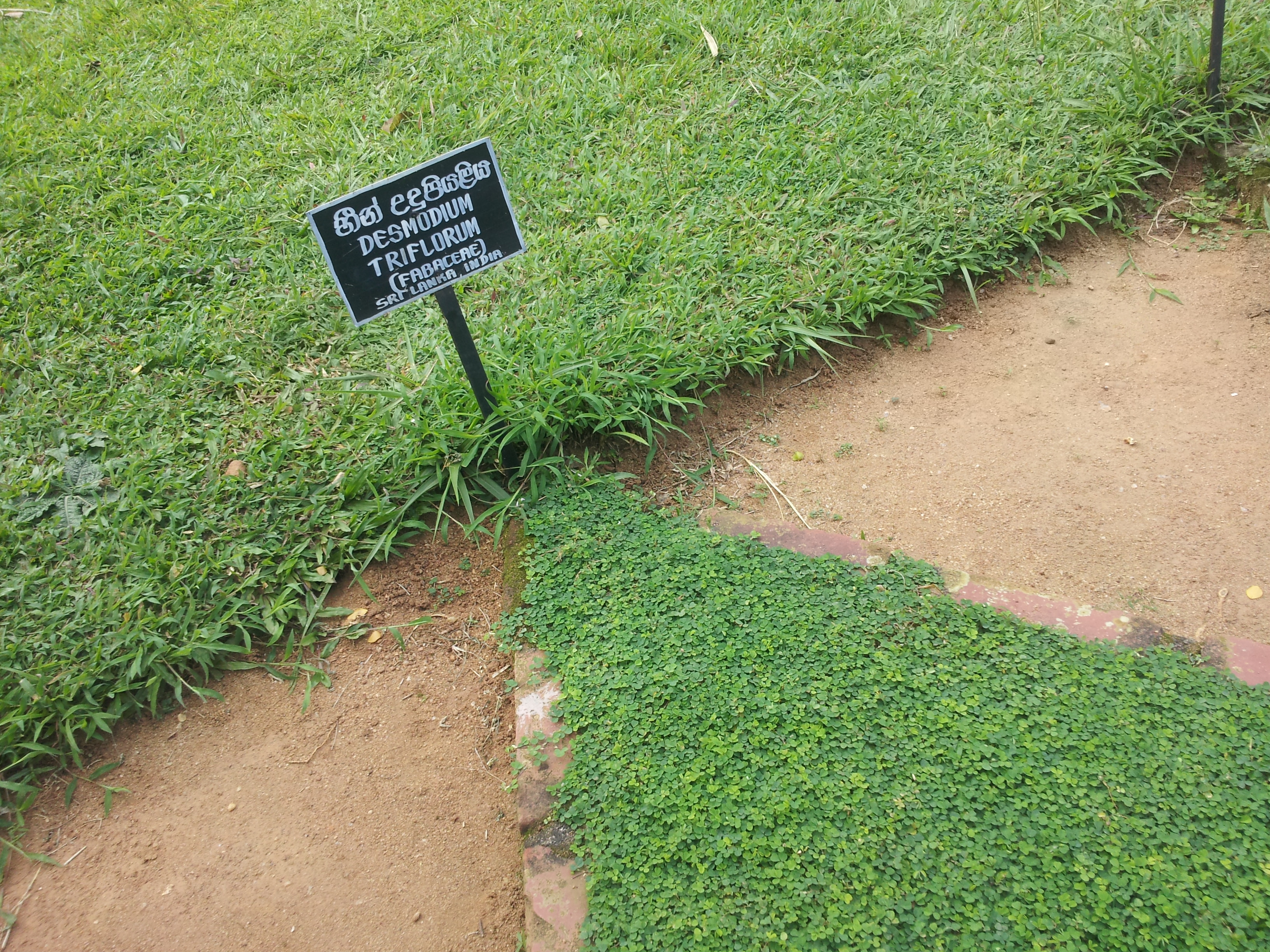
At Peradeniya Royal Botanical Garden
