= C13H16N2O2 =

The molecular formula C_{13}H_{16}N_{2}O_{2} (molar mass : 232.27 g/mol, exact mass : 232.121178) may refer to:

- Aminoglutethimide
- Horsfiline
- 4,5-MDO-DMT
- 5,6-MDO-DMT
- Melatonin, a hormone
- Methylphenylpiracetam
- Mofebutazone
- Tasipimidine
- N,N-Dimethyl-L-tryptophan
