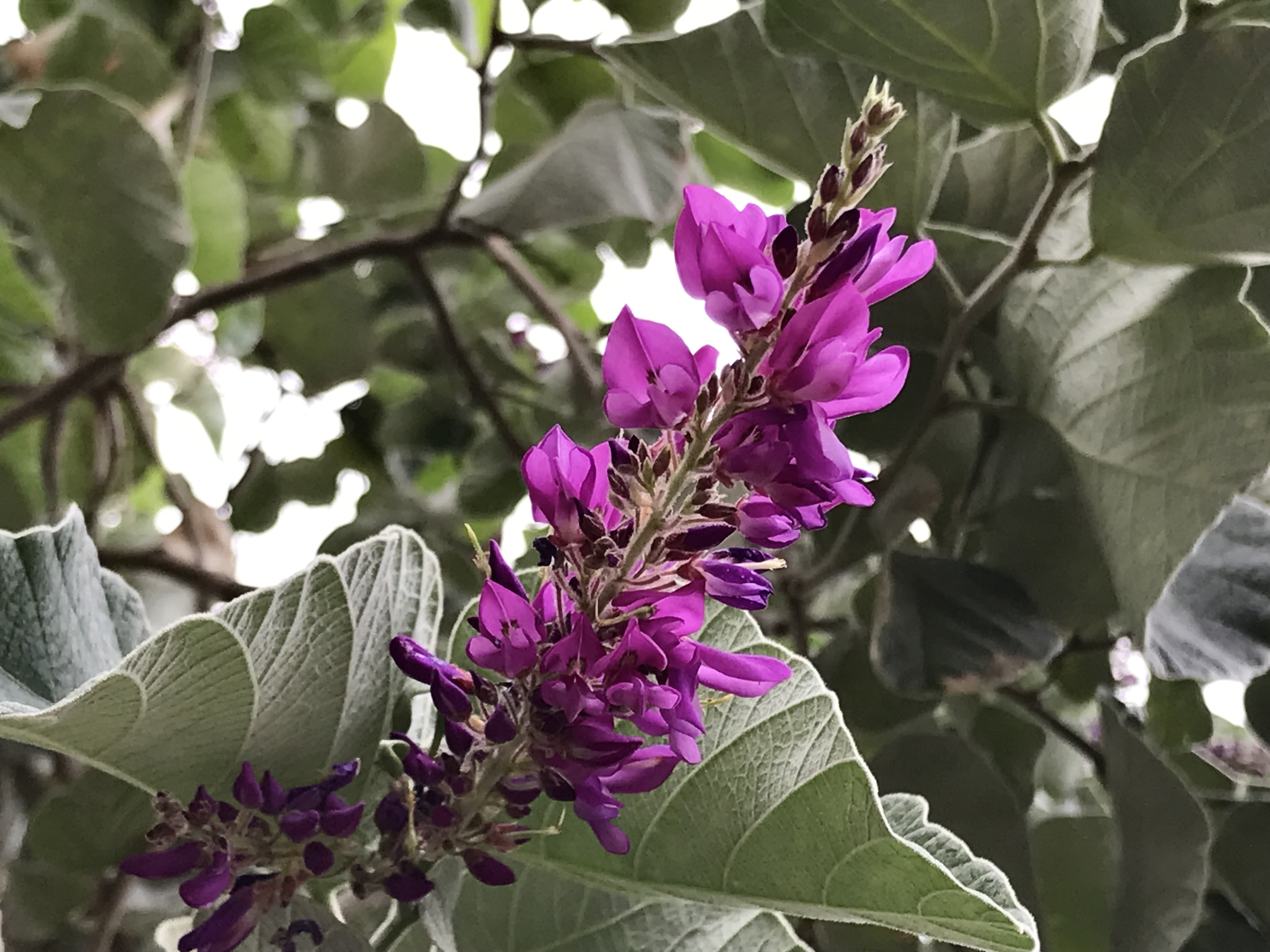
- Sunhangia yunnanensis

Scientific classification
- Kingdom: Plantae
- Clade: Embryophytes
- Clade: Tracheophytes
- Clade: Spermatophytes
- Clade: Angiosperms
- Clade: Eudicots
- Clade: Rosids
- Order: Fabales
- Family: Fabaceae
- Genus: Sunhangia; H.Ohashi & K.Ohashi (2019)

Species
- Six; see text

= Sunhangia =

Genus of flowering plants

Sunhangia is a genus of flowering plants in the pea family (Fabaceae). It includes six species, which range from Afghanistan through Pakistan, India, Tibet, Myanmar, and south-central and north-central China. The species in the genus were formerly placed in genus Desmodium.

- Sunhangia argentea (Wall. ex Benth.) H.Ohashi & K.Ohashi
- Sunhangia calliantha (Franch.) H.Ohashi & K.Ohashi
- Sunhangia elegans (DC.) H.Ohashi & K.Ohashi
- Sunhangia stenophylla (Pamp.) H.Ohashi & K.Ohashi
- Sunhangia wolohoensis (Schindl.) H.Ohashi & K.Ohashi
- Sunhangia yunnanensis (Franch.) H.Ohashi & K.Ohashi

== Gallery ==
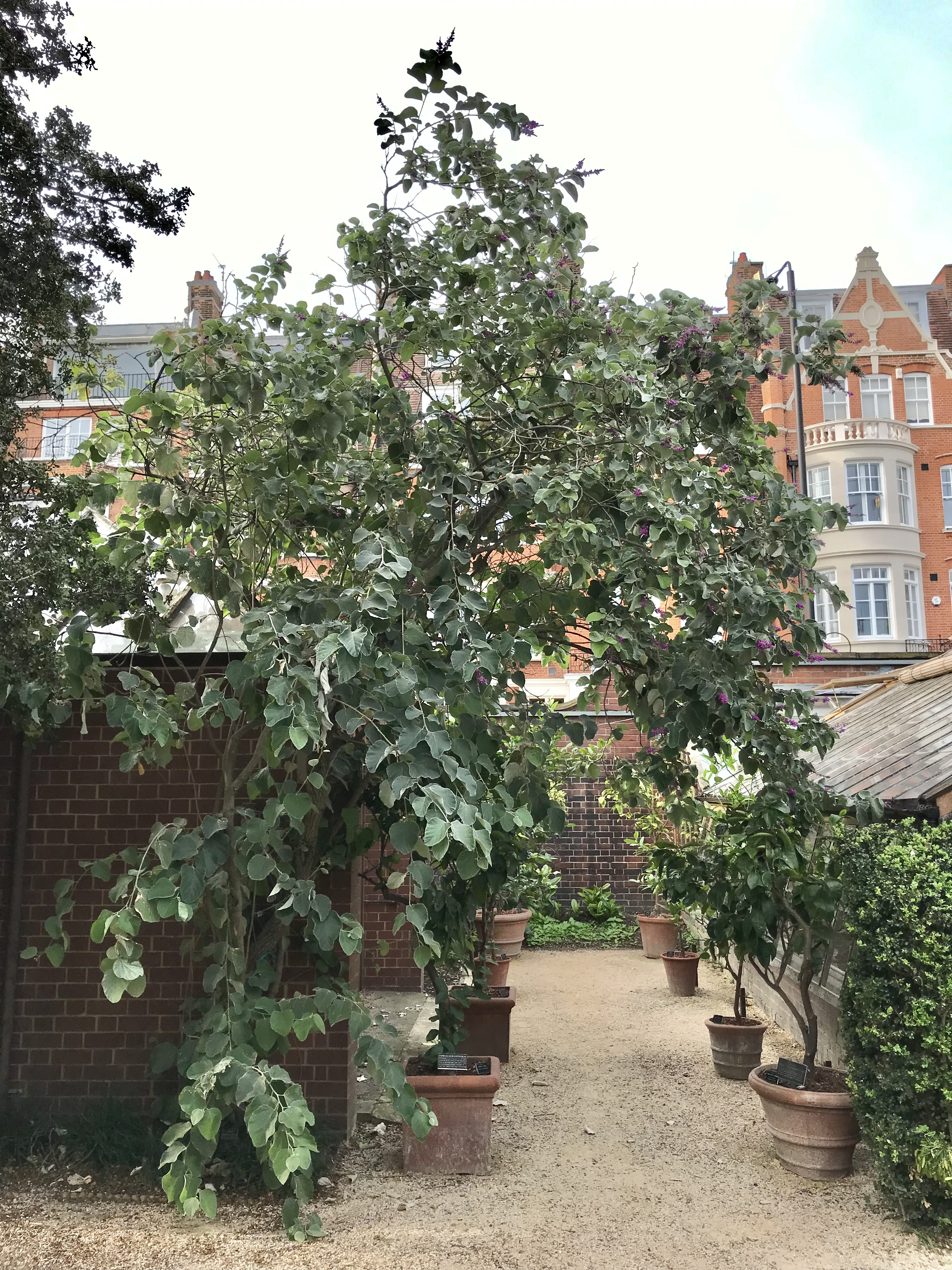
Arborescent specimen of
S. yunnanensis growing in the Chelsea Physic Garden

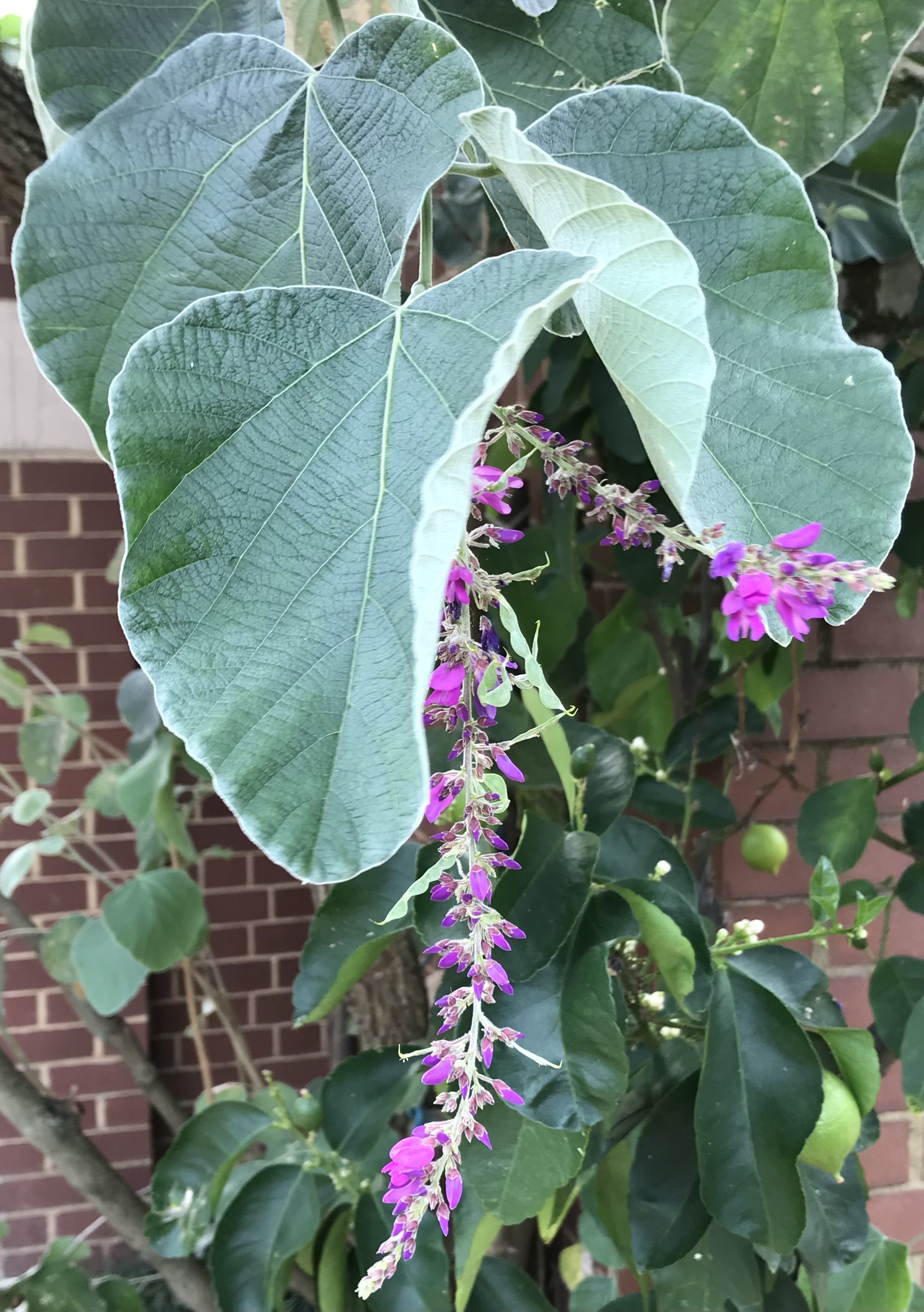
Upper surfaces of leaves of flowering shoot of
S. yunnanensis
