= Areole =

Bumps on cacti out of which grow clusters of spines

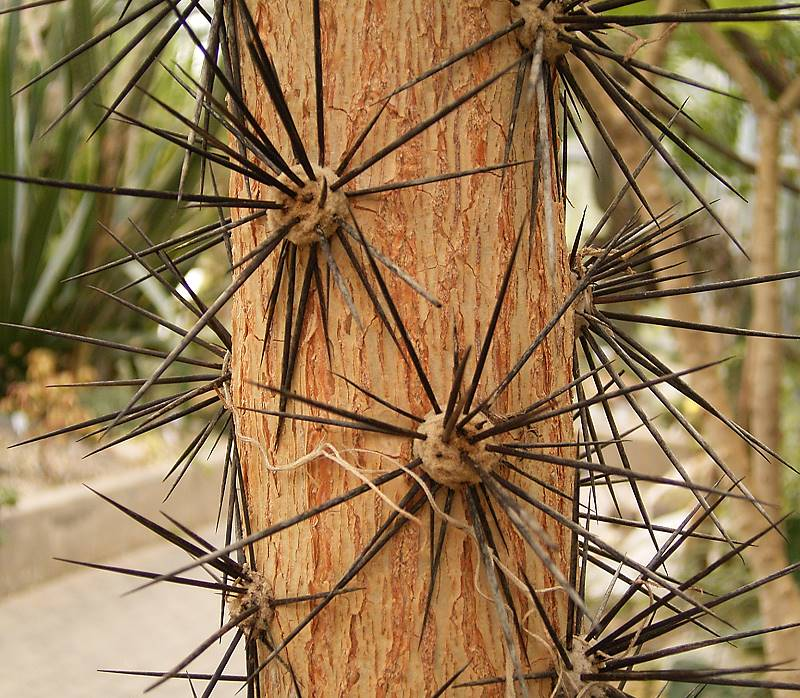
White areoles and black spines growing from the tree-like Pereskia grandifolia

In botany, areoles are small light- to dark-colored bumps on cacti out of which grow clusters of spines. Areoles are important diagnostic features of cacti, and identify them as a family distinct from other succulent plants. The spines are not easily detachable, but on certain cacti, members of the subfamily Opuntioideae, smaller, detachable bristles, glochids, also grow out of the areoles and afford additional protection.

Areole and its spines.

Areoles represent highly specialized branches on cacti. They evolved as abortive branch buds while their spines evolved as vestigial leaves. In branched cacti, such as Opuntioidiae and the saguaro, new branches grow from areoles, because that is where the buds are. The development of the areole seems to have been an important element in the adaptation of cacti to niches in desert ecology.

Some of the Opuntioideae have spines, as well as glochids, on their areoles; some have only glochids. Structurally, the glochids seem to be bristles rather than evolved leaves. They are detachable and resemble small, sharp splinters. Unlike the spines, glochids generally are barbed and are very difficult to remove from the skin.

== Evolution ==
The cactus family, the Cactaceae, evolved 30–40 million years ago in the Americas, originally completely separately from Africa, Europe, and Asia, although, probably within the last few million years, some species of Rhipsalis appear to have been carried to parts of Asia and Africa, most likely by birds.

The areole was one of the unique features that cacti developed, possibly in adaptation to the ambient climate in the area in which they emerged. Accordingly, the areoles distinguish the family Cactaceae from other succulent plants both in the New World and the Old World.

== Importance ==
For the cacti, areoles are an important evolutionary modification. They give rise to spines and glochids, which are their primary means of self-defense. In addition, because these spines arise from areoles and not directly from the plant stem, cacti can more effectively cover themselves with spines than other plants. The spines themselves can be of greater size and number.

In addition, areoles can produce spines of many different types to suit their needs. A typical areole may have one or a few long, sharp central spines, which serve as the primary defense. Beneath them are often numerous (10 or more) smaller, radial spines produced around the edge of the areole. These may serve as a secondary defense against small creatures that can get past the central spines. In some species, though, such as Cephalocereus senilis, the tangle of hairy radial spines serves to shade the plant and retain a layer of cool, humid air next to it.

Areoles contributed largely to the evolutionary success of the Cactaceae throughout the range of the family, and account for the diversification seen in the many species today.

== Gallery ==
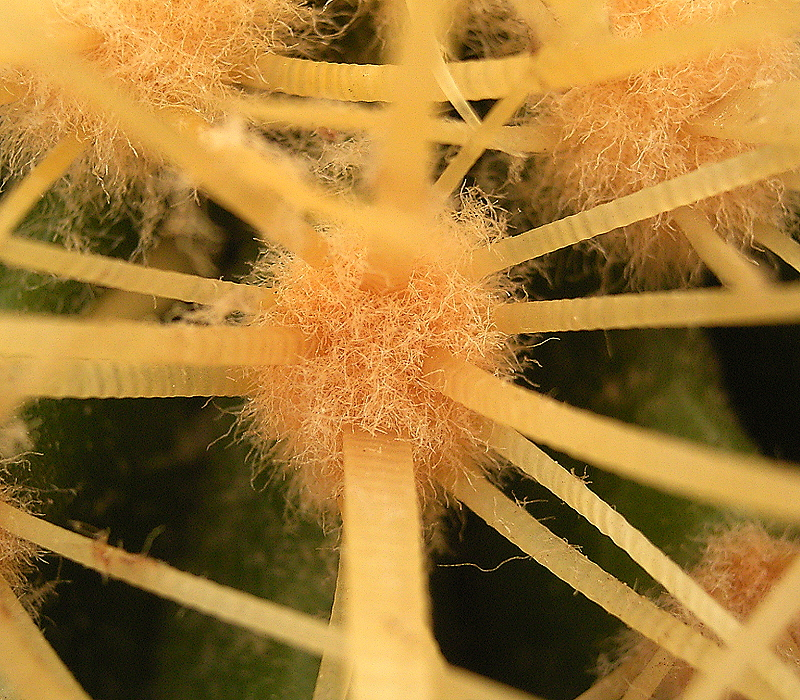
Close-up of the Echinocactus grusonii areole

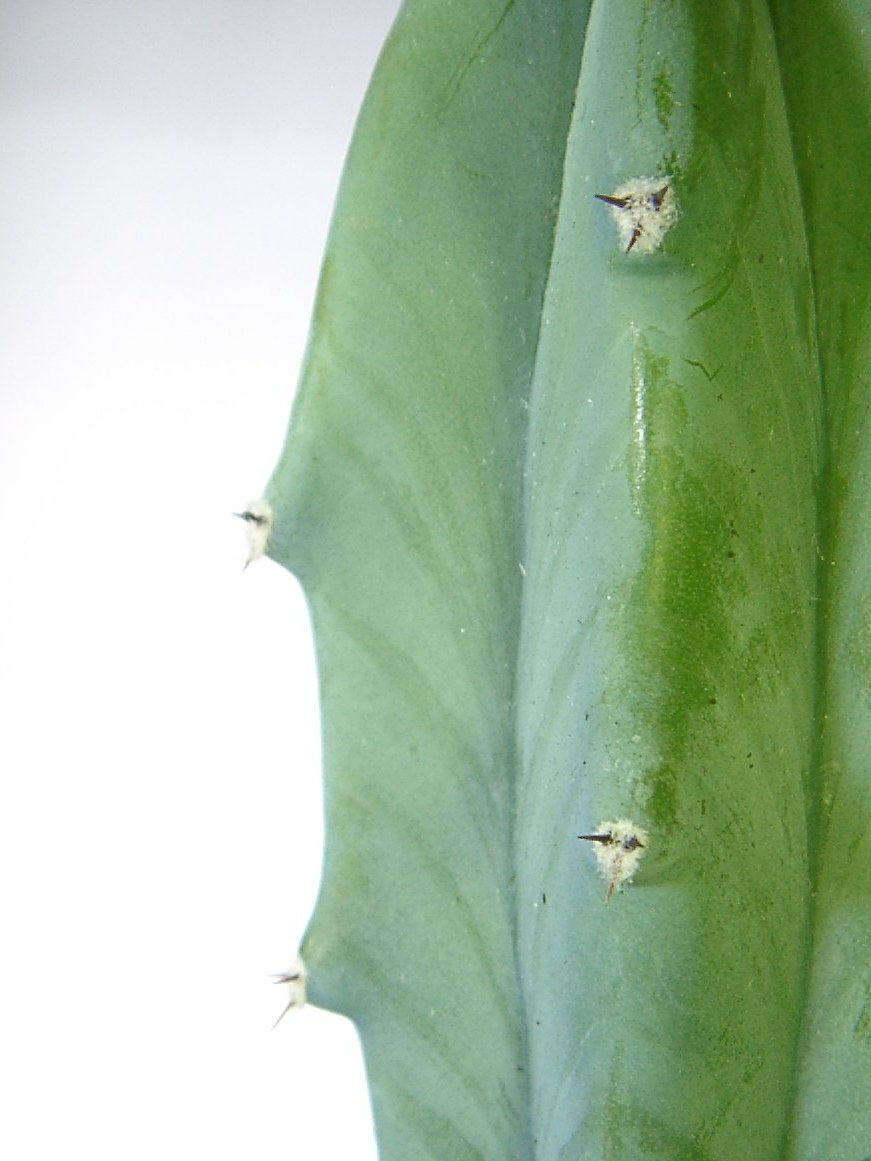
Close-up of Myrtillocactus geometrizans areoles with spines
