= Methyltryptophan =

Methyltryptophan may refer to:

- 1-Methyltryptophan
- α-Methyltryptophan
- Abrine, N-Methyltryptophan
