= Convolutindole A =

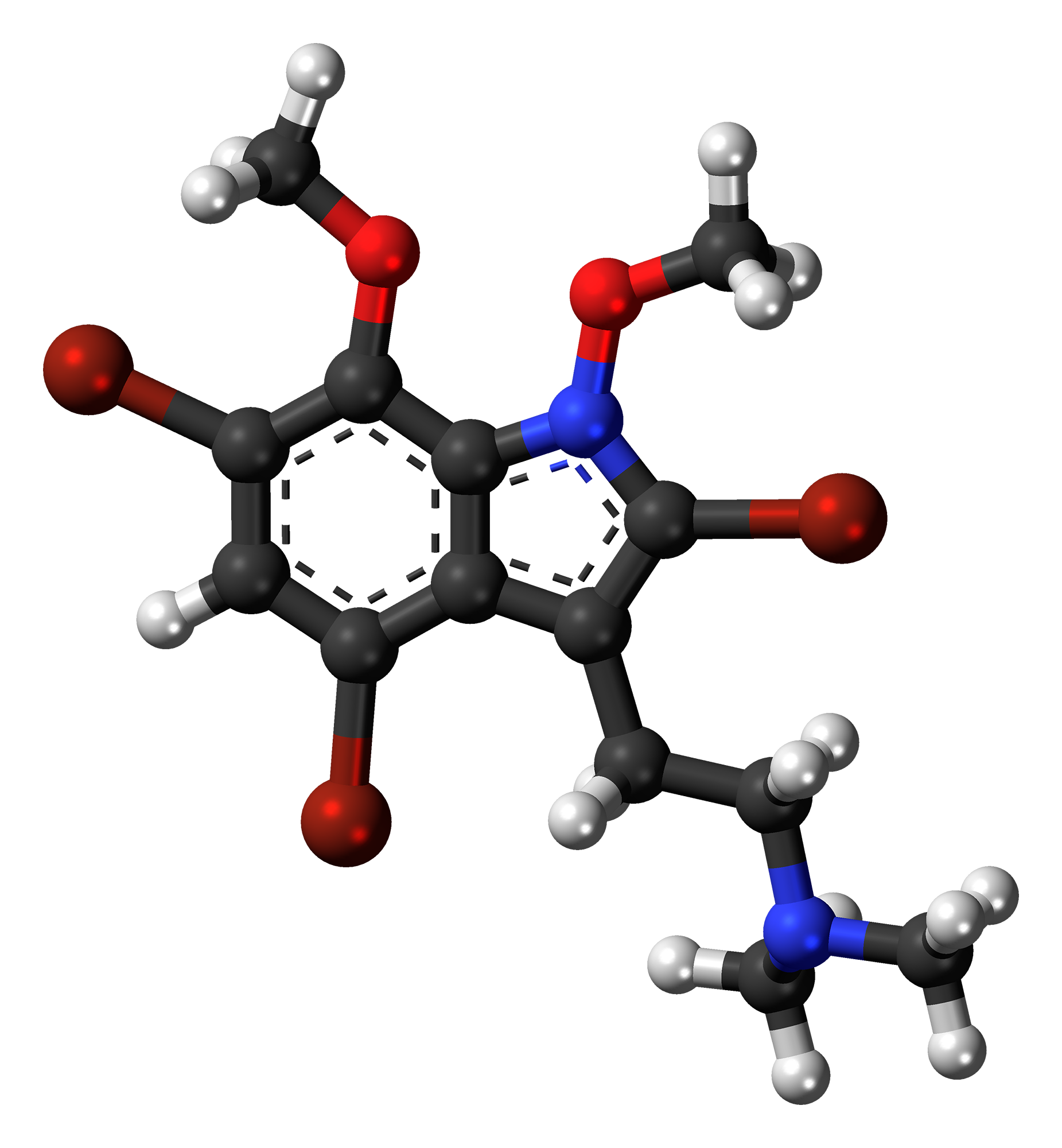

Names
- Preferred IUPAC name N,N-Dimethyl-2-(2,4,6-tribromo-1,7-dimethoxy-1H-indol-3-yl)ethan-1-amine

Identifiers
CAS Number	443356-86-3
3D model (JSmol)	Interactive image
ChemSpider	4481610
PubChem CID	5324072
UNII	D37997A5KB
CompTox Dashboard (EPA)	DTXSID50415867
- InChI: InChI=1S/C14H17Br3N2O2/c1-18(2)6-5-8-11-9(15)7-10(16)13(20-3)12(11)19(21-4)14(8)17/h7H,5-6H2,1-4H3 Key: KPTXBOJWIDAMOS-UHFFFAOYSA-N
- SMILES: CN(C)CCc2c1c(c(OC)c(Br)cc1Br)n(OC)c2Br

Properties
Chemical formula	C_{14}H_{17}Br_{3}N_{2}O_{2}
Molar mass	485.014 g·mol^{−1}
Melting point	61.5 to 62.5 °C (142.7 to 144.5 °F; 334.6 to 335.6 K)
- Except where otherwise noted, data are given for materials in their standard state (at 25 °C [77 °F], 100 kPa). verify (what is ?) Infobox references

Convolutindole A (2,4,6-tribromo-1,7-dimethoxy-N,N-dimethyltryptamine) is a brominated tryptamine alkaloid that was first identified in 2001 in Amathia convoluta, a marine bryozoan. Bryozoans are aquatic invertebrates that grow in colonies and may resemble corals.

== Chemistry ==
Convolutamine A is the 2,4,6-tribromo-1,7-dimethoxy derivative of DMT, a hallucinogen that occurs naturally in many plants and animals. Convolutamine A is chemically related to 5-bromo-DMT which also occurs in many marine invertebrates.

Until the discovery of convolutindole A, the 1-methoxyindole moiety was unknown in the marine world. 1-Methoxyindoles, such as lespedamine, were previously only known to occur in plants of the bean and mustard families.

== Biological activity ==
This chemical was tested for its ability to kill parasitic nematodes. It was found to be more effective than levamisole - a synthetic drug used to kill parasitic worms and to treat colon cancer.
