= N,N-Dimethyl-L-tryptophan =

Names
- IUPAC name (2S)-2-(Dimethylamino)-3-(1H-indol-3-yl)propanoic acid
- Other names: N,N-Dimethyltryptophan; α-Carboxy-N,N-dimethyltryptamine; α-Carboxy-DMT; ACDMT; DMTP

Identifiers
| 3D model (JSmol) | Interactive image |
| ChemSpider | 29329982 |
| PubChem CID | 13946332 |
- InChI: InChI=1S/C13H16N2O2/c1-15(2)12(13(16)17)7-9-8-14-11-6-4-3-5-10(9)11/h3-6,8,12,14H,7H2,1-2H3,(H,16,17)/t12-/m0/s1 Key: SOSHNYKNINOSTB-LBPRGKRZSA-N
- SMILES: CN(C)[C@@H](Cc1c[nH]c2c1cccc2)C(O)=O

Properties
| Chemical formula | C_{13}H_{16}N_{2}O_{2} |
| Molar mass | 232.283 g·mol^{−1} |
- Except where otherwise noted, data are given for materials in their standard state (at 25 °C [77 °F], 100 kPa). Infobox references

N,N-Dimethyl-L-tryptophan (also known as N,N-dimethyltryptophan, α-carboxy-N,N-dimethyltryptamine, α-carboxy-DMT, and DMTP) is an amino acid and natural alkaloid found in both plants and fungi of the genus Psilocybe. It is formed as a result of tryptophan metabolism and represents the end product of a synthesis process catalyzed by the methyltransferase TrpM. This enzyme catalyzes the methylation of L-tryptophan exclusively, resulting in the formation of the closely related alkaloid L-abrine, which is subsequently methylated again to form N,N-dimethyltryptophan.

== Natural occurrence ==
α-Carboxy-DMT is found in the plant Abrus precatorius alongside the alkaloid N-methyltryptophan. α-Carboxy-DMT is also found in the plant Grona triflora, and in fungi of the genus Psilocybe.

=== Biosynthesis in Psylocibe ===
The TrpM enzyme transfers a methyl group from the coenzyme S-adenosyl methionine (SAM) to the nitrogen of the amino group of L-tryptophan. The product is L-abrine, whilst SAM is converted to S-adenosyl homocysteine (SAH); the same TrpM enzyme then takes a second molecule of SAM and adds another methyl group to the same nitrogen atom in L-abrine. The end product of this stage is N,N-dimethyl-L-tryptophan.
