= 5-Bromo-DMT =

Psychedelic drug

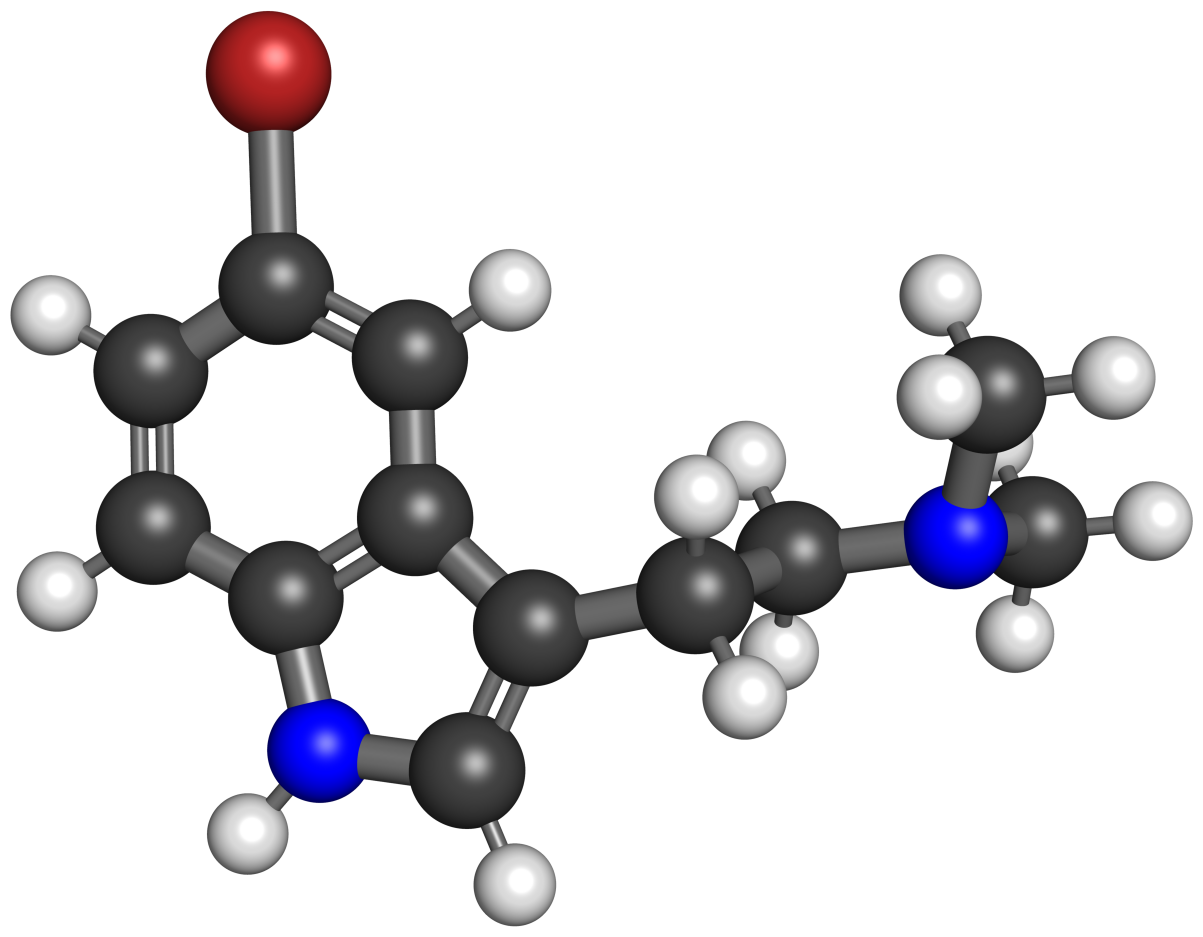

Clinical data
- Other names: 5-Br-DMT; 5-Bromo-N,N-dimethyltryptamine; Sea DMT; Spongebob DMT
- Routes of administration: Smoking
- Drug class: Serotonin receptor agonist; Serotonin 5-HT_{2A} receptor agonist; Serotonergic psychedelic; Hallucinogen
- ATC code: None

Legal status
- Legal status: UK: Class A; Illegal in Singapore

Pharmacokinetic data
- Duration of action: 15 minutes–1.5 hours

Identifiers
- IUPAC name: [2-(5-Bromo-1H-indol-3-yl)ethyl]dimethylamine
- CAS Number: 17274-65-6
- PubChem CID: 360252
- ChemSpider: 319812
- UNII: 2F81I6UW8C
- CompTox Dashboard (EPA): DTXSID90326928

Chemical and physical data
- Formula: C_{12}H_{15}BrN_{2}
- Molar mass: 267.170 g·mol^{−1}
- 3D model (JSmol): Interactive image
- SMILES: BrC2=CC=C1[NH]C=C(C1=C2)CCN(C)C
- InChI: InChI=1S/C12H15BrN2/c1-15(2)6-5-9-8-14-12-4-3-10(13)7-11(9)12/h3-4,7-8,14H,5-6H2,1-2H3; Key:ATEYZYQLBQUZJE-UHFFFAOYSA-N

5-Bromo-DMT, or 5-Br-DMT, also known as 5-bromo-N,N-dimethyltryptamine or by informal names like sea DMT or SpongeBob DMT, is a psychedelic drug and brominated indole alkaloid of the tryptamine family related to dimethyltryptamine (DMT). It is the 5-bromo derivative of DMT. The drug is naturally occurring in the sponges Smenospongia aurea and Smenospongia echina, as well as in Verongula rigida (0.00142% dry weight) alongside 5,6-dibromo-DMT (0.35% dry weight) and seven other alkaloids. It has been encountered as a novel designer drug.

== Use and effects ==
5-Bromo-DMT was only briefly mentioned in Alexander Shulgin's book TiHKAL (Tryptamines I Have Known and Loved) and its properties and effects were not described. Subsequently, the drug has been reported by others to have a dose of 20 to 50 mg smoked and a duration of 15 minutes to 1.5 hours. It is minimally active or inactive orally. It was described as producing mild psychedelic effects, such as visuals, pronounced tactile effects, and euphoria. 5-Bromo-DMT was said to be similar to low-dose DMT, but also distinct from it. A 50 mg dose was said to be near the limit of what can be physically inhaled. However, it was thought that greater exposure to the drug nonetheless might be able to produce stronger effects. These findings were reported in a Shulgin- or TiHKAL-like style by Hamilton Morris and Jason Wallach under the pseudonym "Dr. Osculum".

== Pharmacology ==
=== Pharmacodynamics ===
5-Bromo-DMT is a partial agonist of the serotonin 5-HT_{2A} receptor, with an affinity (K_{i}) of 138 nM, an EC_{50} of 77.7 to 3,090 nM, and an E_{max} of 34 to 100%. It also shows affinity for the serotonin 5-HT_{1A}, 5-HT_{2B}, and 5-HT_{2C} receptors and for the serotonin transporter (SERT) (K_{i} = 16.9 nM, 403 nM, 193 nM, and 971 nM, respectively). The drug is a weak serotonin 5-HT_{1A} receptor full agonist (EC_{50} = 1,810 nM; E_{max} = 94%) and a very weak serotonin reuptake inhibitor (IC_{50} = 8,055 nM).

In contrast to 5-fluoro-DMT and 5-chloro-DMT, 5-bromo-DMT failed to significantly produce the head-twitch response, a behavioral proxy of psychedelic effects, in rodents. As such, 5-bromo-DMT would be expected to be non-hallucinogenic in humans. In addition, 5-bromo-DMT antagonized the head-twitch response induced by 5-fluoro-DMT. On the other hand, 5-bromo-DMT produced antidepressant-like effects, hypolocomotion or sedative-like effects, and hypothermia in rodents. Moreover, 5-bromo-DMT has been found to produce psychoplastogenic effects.

== Chemistry ==
=== Synthesis ===
The chemical synthesis of 5-bromo-DMT has been described.

=== Analogues ===
Analogues of 5-bromo-DMT include 5,6-dibromo-DMT, 4-bromo-DMT, 5-fluoro-DMT, 5-chloro-DMT, bretisilocin (5-fluoro-MET), 5-fluoro-DET, 5-fluoro-AMT, 5-chloro-AMT, BK-5Br-NM-AMT, 5-nitro-DMT, convolutindole A, desformylflustrabromine, and plakohypaphorine, among others.

== History ==
5-Bromo-DMT was briefly mentioned by Alexander Shulgin in his 1991 book TiHKAL (Tryptamines I Have Known and Loved), but he did not synthesize or test it. Hamilton Morris and Jason Wallach reported the properties and hallucinogenic effects of 5-bromo-DMT in humans under the pseudonym "Dr. Osculum" in 2013. 5-Bromo-DMT was described as a novel designer drug by 2020.

== Society and culture ==
=== Legal status ===
==== Canada ====
5-Bromo-DMT is not a controlled substance in Canada as of 2025.

==== Singapore ====
5-Bromo-DMT is specifically listed as a controlled drug in Singapore.

==== United States ====
5-Bromo-DMT is not an explicitly controlled substance in the United States. However, it could be considered a controlled substance under the Federal Analogue Act if intended for human consumption.

== See also ==
- Substituted tryptamine
