= 4-Bromo-DMT =

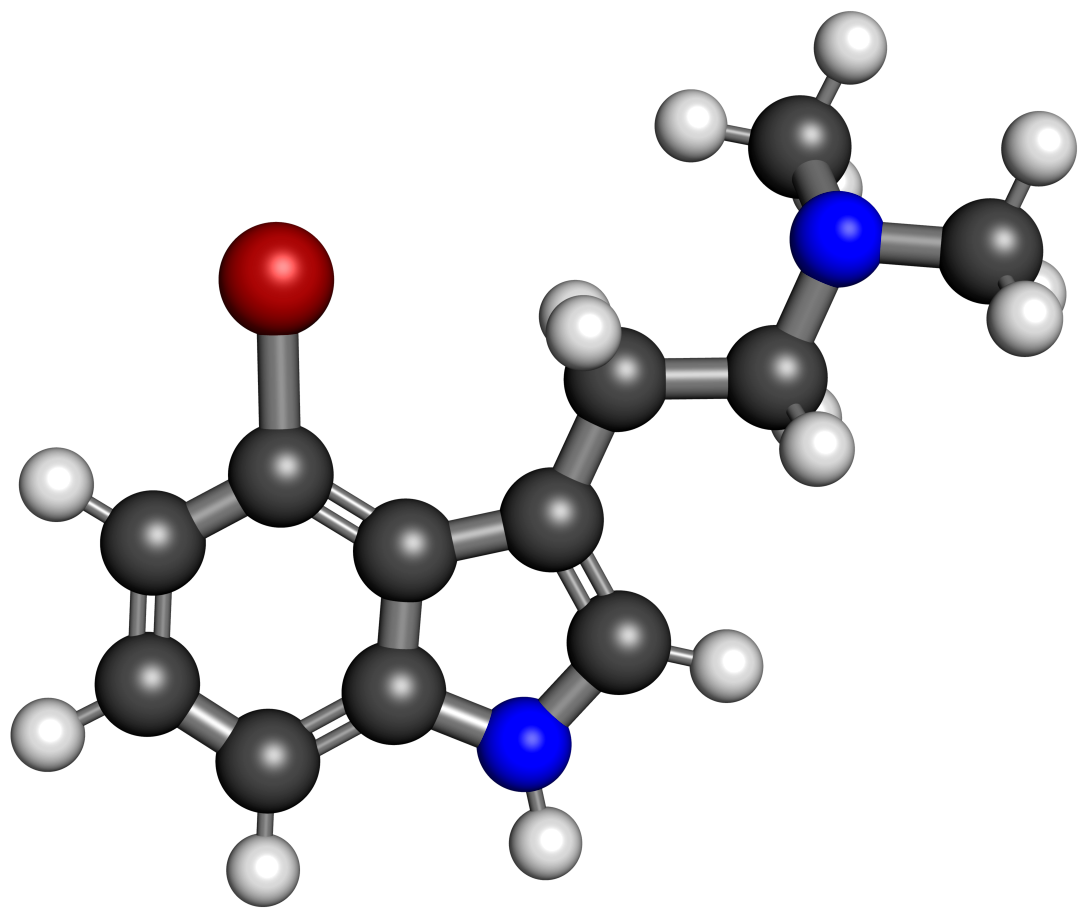

Clinical data
- Other names: 4-Br-DMT; 4-Bromo-N,N-dimethyltryptamine; 4-Bromo-N,N-DMT
- Drug class: Serotonin receptor modulator; Serotonin releasing agent; Psychoactive drug
- ATC code: None

Identifiers
- IUPAC name: 2-(4-bromo-1H-indol-3-yl)-N,N-dimethylethanamine
- PubChem CID: 84711859
- ChemSpider: 45399444

Chemical and physical data
- Formula: C_{12}H_{15}BrN_{2}
- Molar mass: 267.170 g·mol^{−1}
- 3D model (JSmol): Interactive image
- SMILES: CN(C)CCC1=CNC2=C1C(=CC=C2)Br
- InChI: InChI=1S/C12H15BrN2/c1-15(2)7-6-9-8-14-11-5-3-4-10(13)12(9)11/h3-5,8,14H,6-7H2,1-2H3; Key:HBSUMCTTXGWDDS-UHFFFAOYSA-N

4-Bromo-DMT, or 4-Br-DMT, also known as 4-bromo-N,N-dimethyltryptamine, is a non-selective serotonin receptor modulator and serotonin releasing agent of the tryptamine family related to serotonergic psychedelics like psilocin (4-HO-DMT) and 5-bromo-DMT.

== Pharmacology ==
=== Pharmacodynamics ===
4-Bromo-DMT shows high affinity for a variety of serotonin receptors, including the serotonin 5-HT_{1A}, 5-HT_{2A}, 5-HT_{2B}, 5-HT_{2C}, 5-HT_{6}, and 5-HT_{7} receptors (K_{i} = 3.5–82 nM). The drug shows higher affinity for almost all of these receptors than psilocin or dimethyltryptamine (DMT). Its potential agonistic and antagonistic activities at serotonin receptors including the serotonin 5-HT_{2A} receptor were not assessed. In addition to interacting with serotonin receptors, 4-bromo-DMT is a potent serotonin reuptake inhibitor (IC_{50} = 167 nM) as well as a partial serotonin releasing agent in rat brain synaptosomes (EC_{50} = 132 nM; E_{max} = 45%). It showed little or no activity in terms of inhibition of dopamine and norepinephrine reuptake.

Unlike psilocin and DMT, 4-bromo-DMT fails to induce the head-twitch response, a behavioral proxy of psychedelic effects, in rodents, suggesting that 4-bromo-DMT would not produce hallucinogenic effects in humans. The serotonin 5-HT_{1A} receptor antagonist WAY-100635 and the serotonin 5-HT_{2C} receptor antagonist SB-242084 did not unmask latent head-twitch response activity with 4-bromo-DMT. Although it did not produce psychedelic-like activity in rodents, 4-bromo-DMT produced hypolocomotion and hypothermia at high doses in rodents similarly to psilocin and DMT. In contrast to psilocin and DMT however, 4-bromo-DMT produced seizures and death at the highest assessed dose in rodents.

== Chemistry ==
The chemical synthesis of 4-bromo-DMT has been described. It is not a controlled substance and is considered useful as a precursor in 4-substituted tryptamine synthesis.

== History ==
4-Bromo-DMT was first described in the scientific literature by Jeremy Rolquin at Virginia Commonwealth University by 2022. Subsequently, it was described in greater detail by Grant C. Glatfelter and colleagues by 2026. The drug was encountered as a novel designer drug in Canada in 2022.

== See also ==
- Substituted tryptamine
- 4-Fluoro-DMT
- 5-Bromo-DMT
