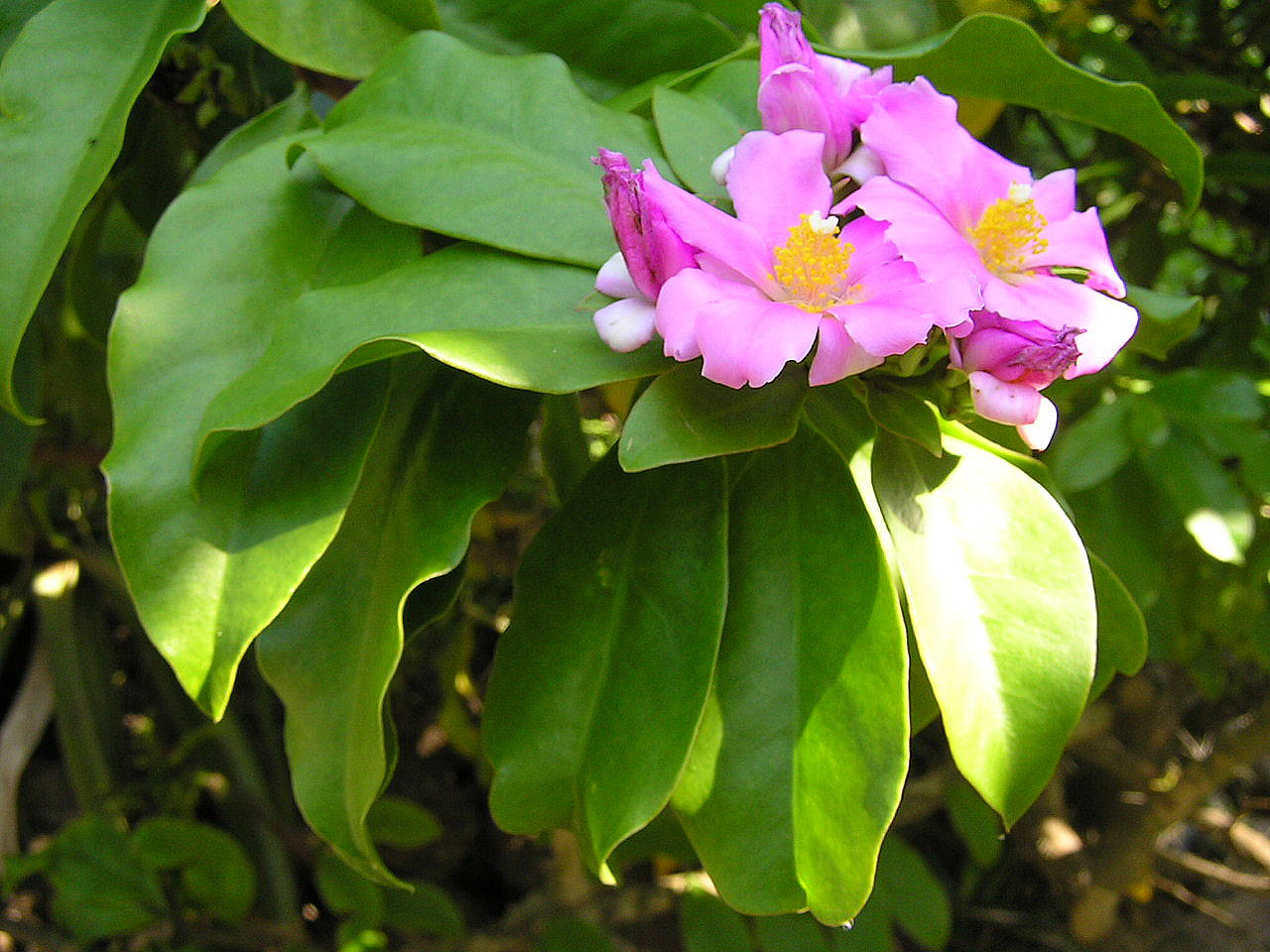

Scientific classification
- Kingdom: Plantae
- Clade: Tracheophytes
- Clade: Angiosperms
- Clade: Eudicots
- Order: Caryophyllales
- Family: Cactaceae
- Genus: Pereskia
- Species: P. grandifolia

Binomial name
- Pereskia grandifolia Haw.

Synonyms
- Cactus grandifolius Link; Cactus rosa Vell.; Pereskia grandiflora Pfeiff.; Pereskia ochnacarpa Miq.; Pereskia rosea A.Dietr.; Pereskia tampicana F.A.C.Weber; Rhodocactus grandifolius (Haw.) F.M.Knuth; Rhodocactus tampicanus (F.A.C.Weber) Backeb.

= Pereskia grandifolia =

Species of cactus

Pereskia grandifolia (rose cactus; syn. Rhodocactus grandifolius) is a species of cactus native to eastern and southern Brazil. Like all species in the genus Pereskia and unlike most cacti, it has persistent leaves. It was first described in 1819. It is grown as an ornamental plant and has naturalized outside its native range.

== Description ==
Although Pereskia grandifolia is a cactus by classification, it takes the form of a shrub or small tree, 2–5 m (7–16 ft) in height, exceptionally 10 m (33 ft). Young twigs are green or reddish with conspicuous white spots marking the stomata. Its trunk has grayish-brown bark and has a diameter of up to 20 cm (8 in). The areoles are rounded, cushion-shaped, and with grayish or brownish tomentum. On the twigs, they are 3–7 mm (0.1–0.3 in) across and up to 12 mm (0.5 in) on the main trunk. The areoles can have one to three or occasionally four leaves (brachyblast leaves) in addition to spines. The spines range from black to brown, the number at each areole gradually increasing with age; new twigs can have spineless areoles, while the trunk areoles may have up to 90 spines, each 2–6.5 cm (0.8–2.6 in) long. The leaves vary in size, and are usually from 9–6.5 cm (3.5–2.6 in) long, but can be shorter or up to 30 cm (11.8 in) long. They are entire, with shapes ranging from elliptic to ovate and obovate-lanceolate. The dense inflorescence develops at the ends of stems and also laterally from the areoles of upper parts of the main shoots and twigs. It usually has 10-15 flowers, but sometimes has 30 or more. The flowers which may be pale pink through to purplish-pink are showy and rose-like, about 3–5 cm (1.2–2.0 in) across. The fruit is very variable in size and shape, and is green, yellowish or reddish-green when ripe. It contains many glossy black seeds.

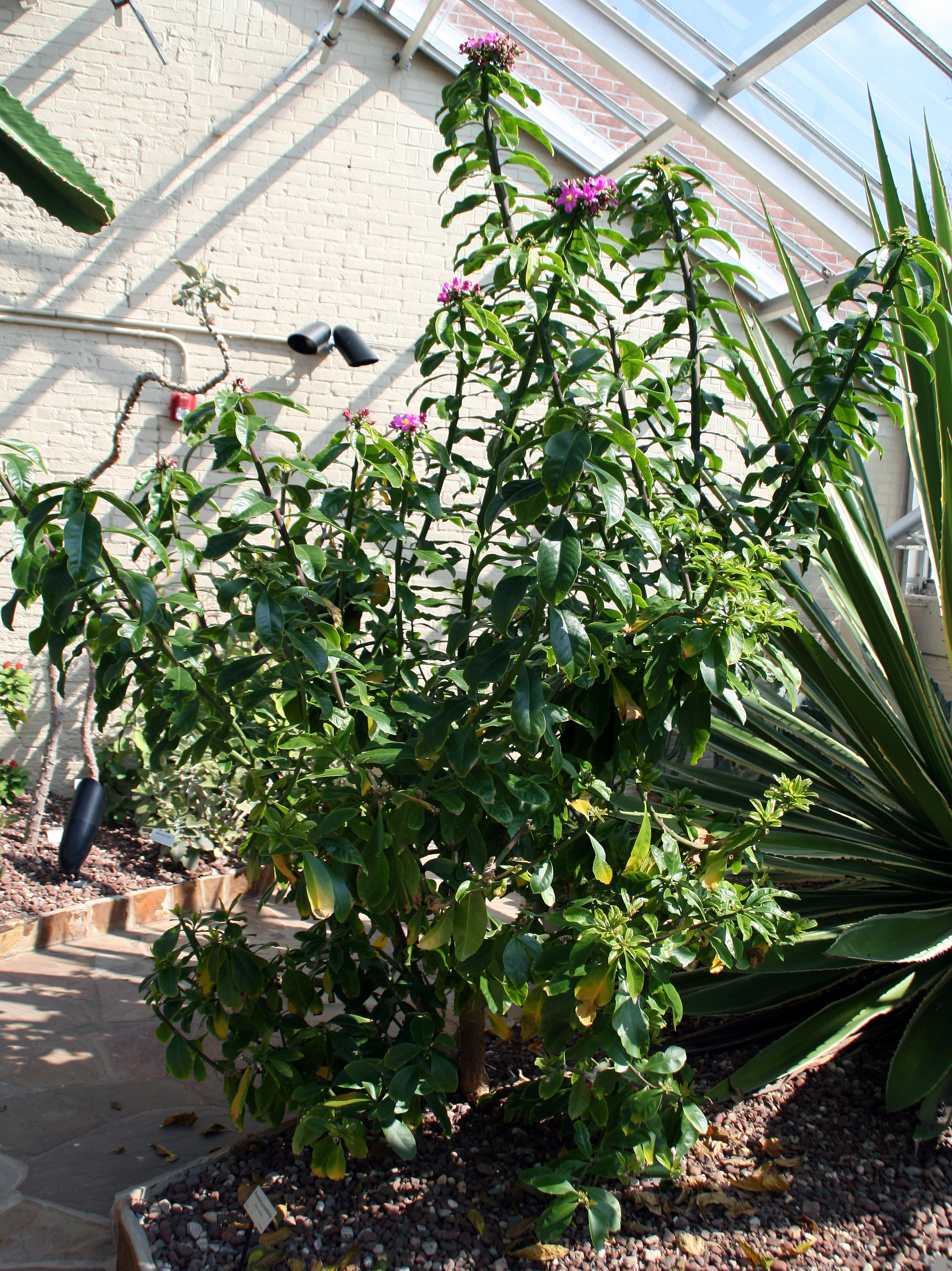
Habit, in cultivation

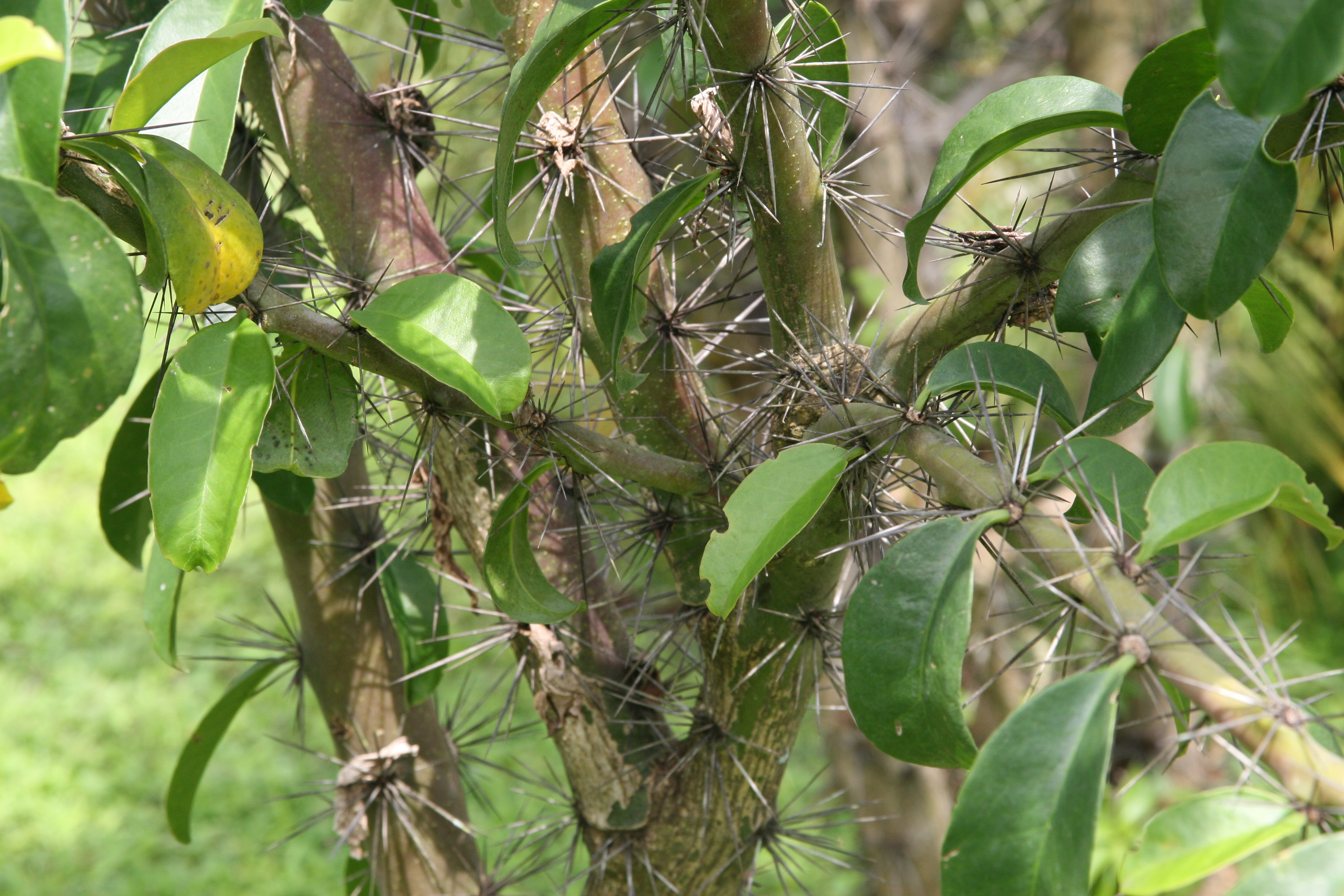
Spines on stems

== Taxonomy ==
The species was first described by Adrian Hardy Haworth in 1819. It was transferred to Rhodocactus as R. grandifolius by Frederik Marcus Knuth in 1936. However, this was not accepted by most botanists, and Rhodocactus was sunk into a broadly circumscribed Pereskia. Molecular phylogenetic studies from 2005 onwards suggested that with this circumscription, Pereskia was not monophyletic, and consisted of three clades. In 2016, the genus Rhodocactus was revived for one of these clades, which included R. grandifolius. As of April 2026 the transfer was not accepted by Plants of the World Online.

== Distribution ==
The species is native to eastern and southern Brazil. It is widely cultivated in other parts of South America, the West Indies and beyond, and has become naturalized in some of these countries, including Vietnam.

== Uses ==
Pereskia grandifolia is grown as an ornamental plant, appreciated for its flowers. It is also used as a hedge. Its leaves can be eaten as a salad or used in stews.
