= Plakohypaphorine =

Class of chemical compounds

Plakohypaphorines are halogenated indolic non-proteinogenic amino acids named for their similarity to hypaphorine (N,N,N-trimethyltryptophan). First reported in the Caribbean sponge Plakortis simplex in 2003, plakohypaphorines A-C were the first iodine-containing indole alkaloids to be discovered in nature. Plakohypaphorines D-F, also found in P. simplex, were reported in 2004 by a group including the researchers who discovered the original plakohypaphorines.

| Plakohypaphorine | Chemical name | Chemical formula | SMILES | Image |
|---|---|---|---|---|
| Plakohypaphorine | 7-Iodo-N,N,N-trimethyltryptophan | C_{14}H_{17}IN_{2}O_{2} | OC(=O)C(N(C)(C)C)Cc2cnc1c2cccc1I | Chemical structure of Plakohypaphorine A |
| Plakohypaphorine B | 6,7-Diiodo-N,N,N-trimethyltryptophan | C_{14}H_{16}I_{2}N_{2}O_{2} | OC(=O)C(N(C)(C)C)Cc2cnc1c2ccc(I)c1I | Chemical structure of Plakohypaphorine B |
| Plakohypaphorine C | 5,7-Diiodo-N,N,N-trimethyltryptophan | C_{14}H_{16}I_{2}N_{2}O_{2} | CN(C)(C)C(C(=O)O)Cc2cnc1c2cc(I)cc1I | Chemical structure of Plakohypaphorine C |
| Plakohypaphorine D | 5,6-Diiodo-N,N,N-trimethyltryptophan | C_{14}H_{16}I_{2}N_{2}O_{2} | Ic2cc1c(cc2I)ncc1CC(C(O)=O)N(C)(C)C | Chemical structure of Plakohypaphorine D |
| Plakohypaphorine E | 5,6,7-Triiodo-N,N,N-trimethyltryptophan | C_{14}H_{15}I_{3}N_{2}O_{2} | CN(C)(C)C(C(=O)O)Cc1cnc(c(I)c2I)c1cc2I | Chemical structure of Plakohypaphorine E |
| Plakohypaphorine F | 6-Chloro-5-iodo-N,N,N-trimethyltryptophan | C_{14}H_{16}ClIN_{2}O_{2} | Clc2c1ncc(CC(C(O)=O)N(C)(C)C)c1cc(I)c2 | Chemical structure of Plakohypaphorine F |
