= Abrine =

L-Abrine

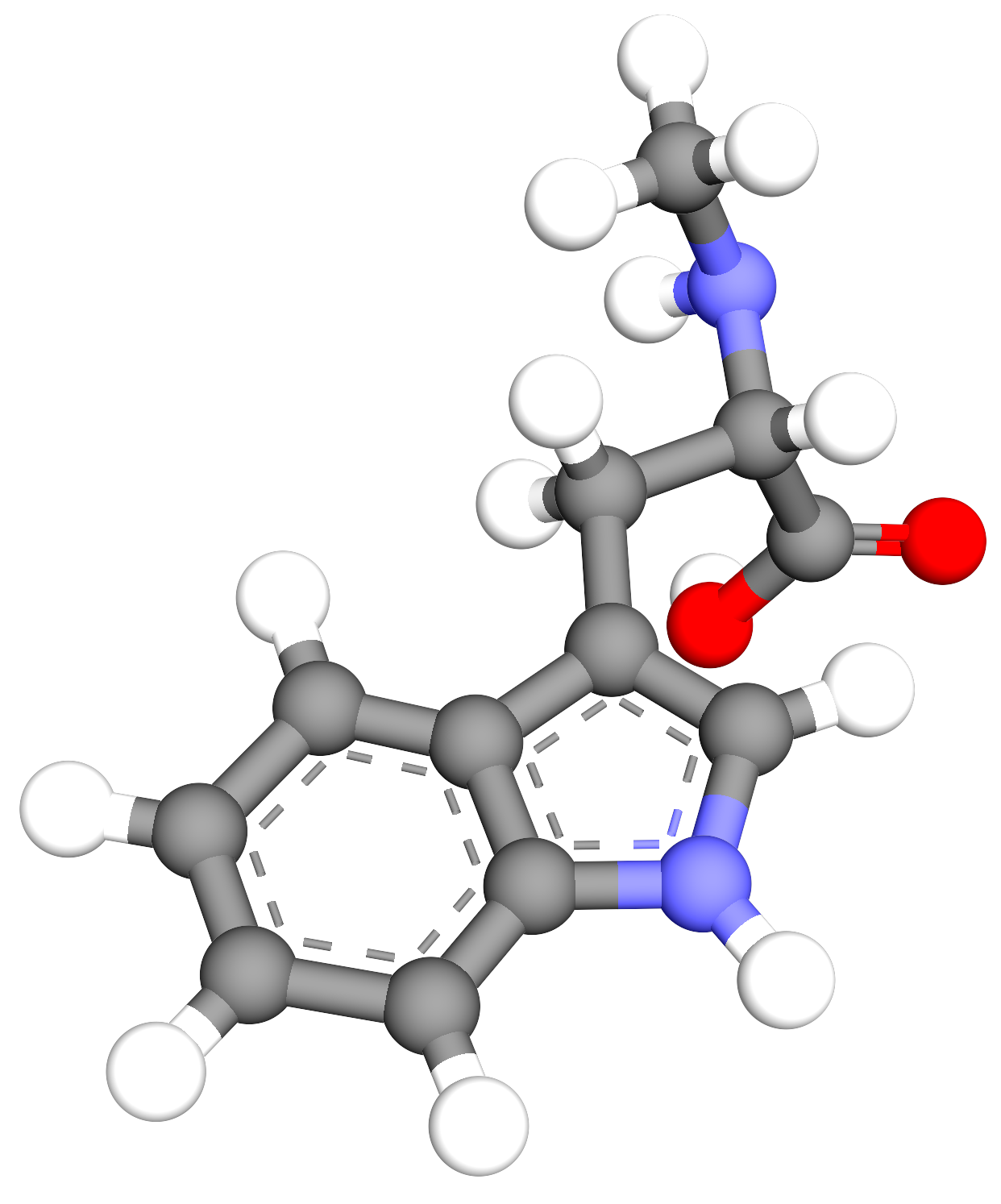

Names
- IUPAC name (2S)-3-(1H-indol-3-yl)-2-(methylamino)propanoic acid
- Other names Abrine; N-Methyl-L-tryptophan; N-Methyl-L-tryptophane; N-methyltryptophan; N-Me-Trp-OH; E9M; α-Carboxy-N-methyltryptamine; α-COOH-NMT; AR; L-(+)-Abrine; (+)-Abrine; (±)-Abrine; ABR

Identifiers
CAS Number	526-31-8
3D model (JSmol)	Interactive image
ChEBI	CHEBI:15334
ChEMBL	ChEMBL552941
ChemSpider	141047
ECHA InfoCard	100.007.627
EC Number	208-388-5
KEGG	C02983
PubChem CID	160511
UNII	P57TWL22IX
CompTox Dashboard (EPA)	DTXSID40967027
- InChI: InChI=1S/C12H14N2O2/c1-13-11(12(15)16)6-8-7-14-10-5-3-2-4-9(8)10/h2-5,7,11,13-14H,6H2,1H3,(H,15,16)/t11-/m0/s1 Key: CZCIKBSVHDNIDH-NSHDSACASA-N
- SMILES: CN[C@@H](CC1=CNC2=CC=CC=C21)C(=O)O

Properties
Chemical formula	C_{12}H_{14}N_{2}O_{2}
Molar mass	218.256 g·mol^{−1}
- Except where otherwise noted, data are given for materials in their standard state (at 25 °C [77 °F], 100 kPa). Infobox references

L-Abrine, also known as N-methyltryptophan, is a levorotatory amino acid and also a derivative of L-tryptophan, in which a methyl group is attached to the nitrogen atom in the α-position. L-Abrine is found mainly in the seeds of Abrus precatorius.

== Pharmacology ==
L-Abrine enhances the efficacy of immunotherapy for liver cancer by suppressing tumor defense mechanisms through inhibition of the IDO1 enzyme and by acting in synergy with PD-1 inhibitors drugs. L-Abrine effectively inhibits lung cancer metastasis by blocking the MAPK signaling pathway through direct binding to the ERK protein, which leads to the reversal of the epithelial-mesenchymal transition and the activation of the Nrf2 antioxidant system without causing systemic toxicity, L-abrine may be effective both as a standalone agent and in combination with ERK inhibitors. L-Abrine has also been studied as an agonist of peroxisome proliferator-activated receptors.

L-abrine inhibited the SPTBN2 protein, which blocks the membrane localization of the SLC7A11 transporter and induces ferroptosis in resistant cancer cells. L-abrin exhibits a marked sedative effect and potentiates the effects of hypnotics; however, its binding to GABAA receptors is relatively weak and is most likely complemented by effects on other brain systems.

== Natural occurrence ==
L-Abrine has been found in plants of the genus Abrus, with Abrus precatorius being the primary source (ranging from 0.5 to 1.0% of dry weight). It was previously believed that L-abrine was characteristic only of the genus Abrus, but it has also been identified in the chemical composition of Pereskia aculeata and Pereskia grandifolia.

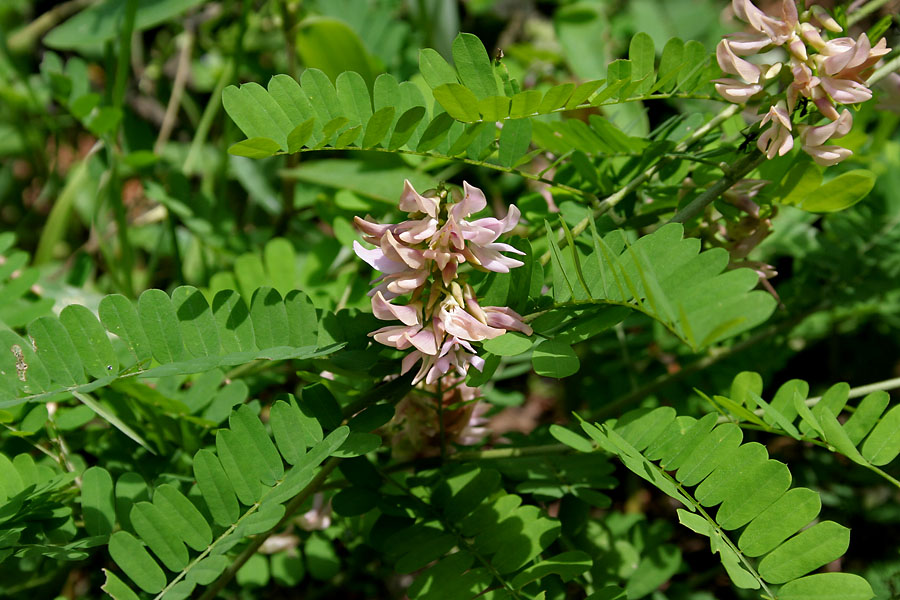
Abrus precatorius

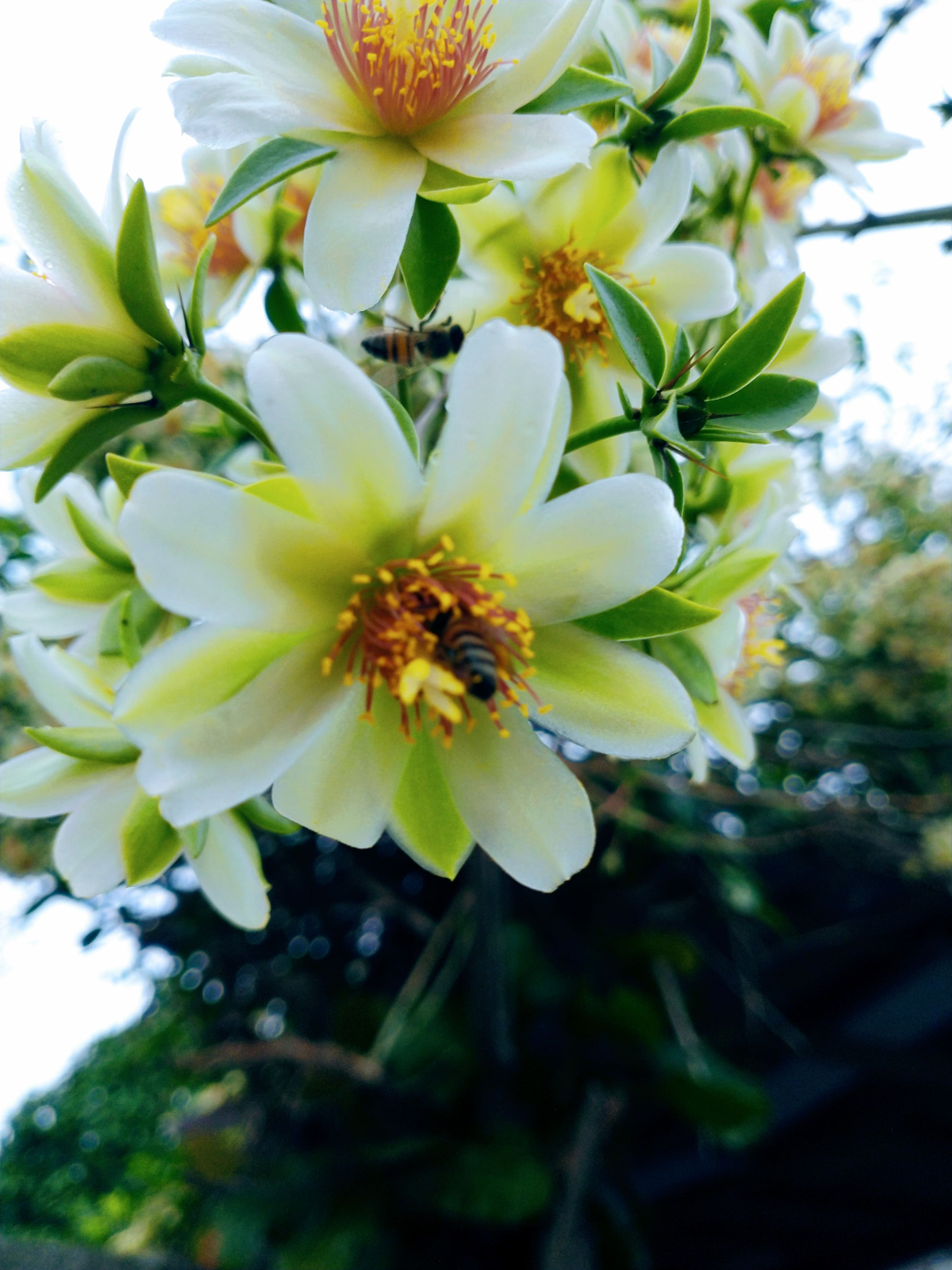
Pereskia aculeata

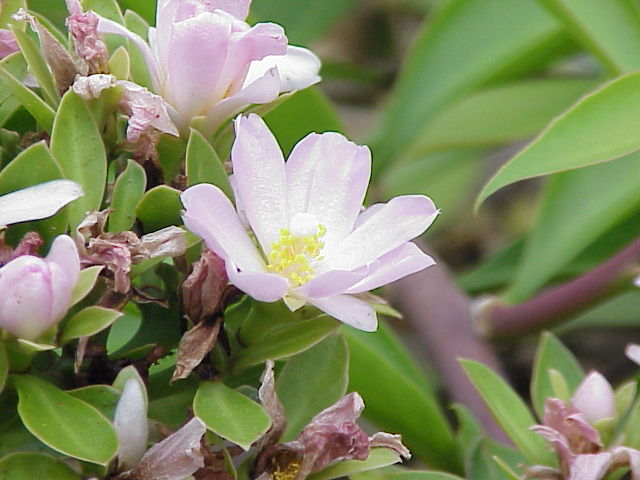
Pereskia grandifolia
