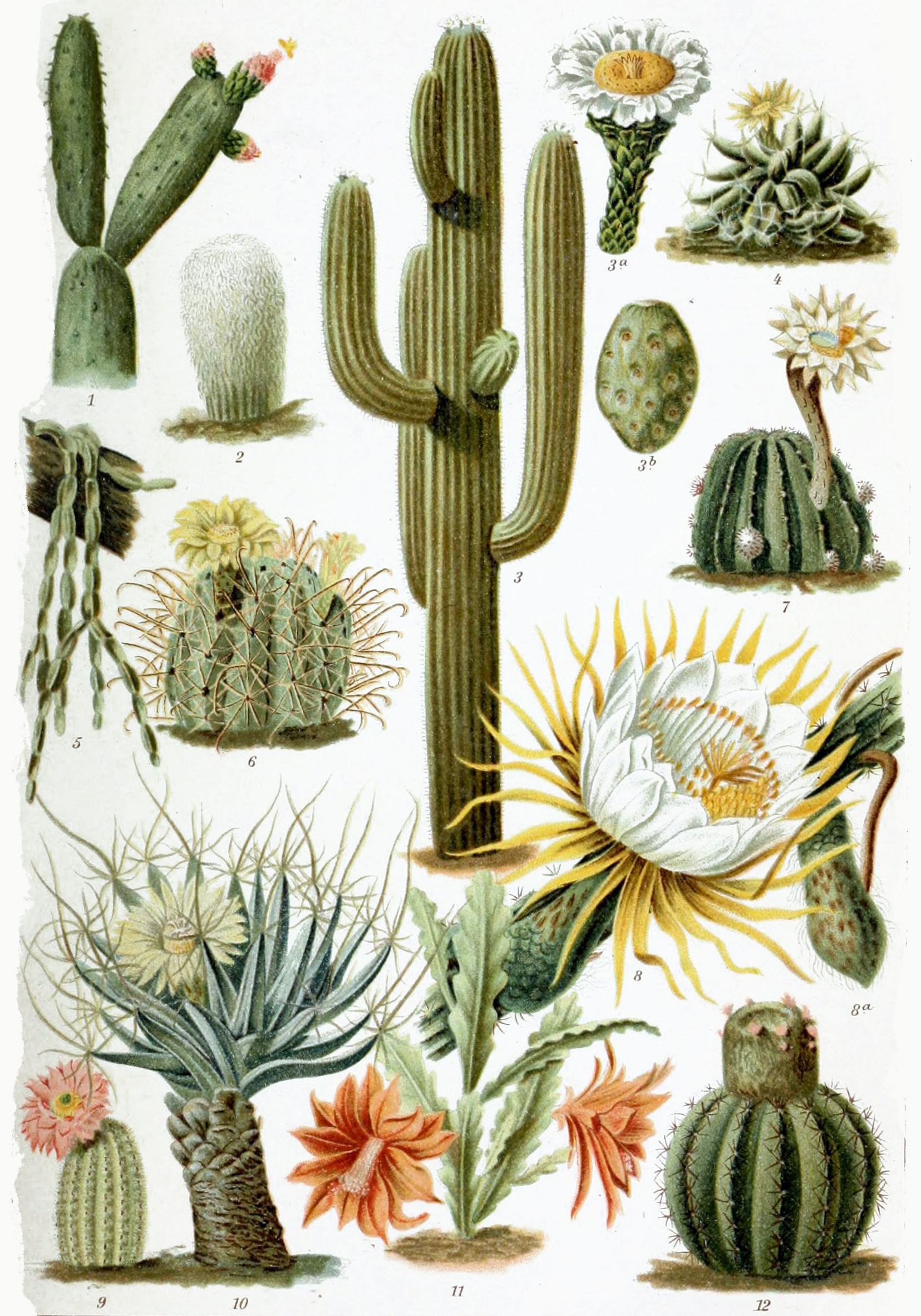
- Various Cactaceae from Brockhaus' Konversations-Lexikon v. 2 1892

Scientific classification
- Kingdom: Plantae
- Clade: Tracheophytes
- Clade: Angiosperms
- Clade: Eudicots
- Order: Caryophyllales
- Suborder: Portulacineae
- Family: Cactaceae; Juss.

Type genus
- Mammillaria Haw.

Subfamilies
- Cactoideae; Maihuenioideae; Opuntioideae; Pereskioideae; Leuenbergerioideae; See also Taxonomy of the Cactaceae

Synonyms
- Opuntiaceae Desv.; Leuchtenbergiaceae Salm-Dyck ex Pfeiff.

= Cactus =

Cactus Temporal range: 35–0 Ma Late Eocene – Recent

Family of mostly succulent plants, adapted to dry environments

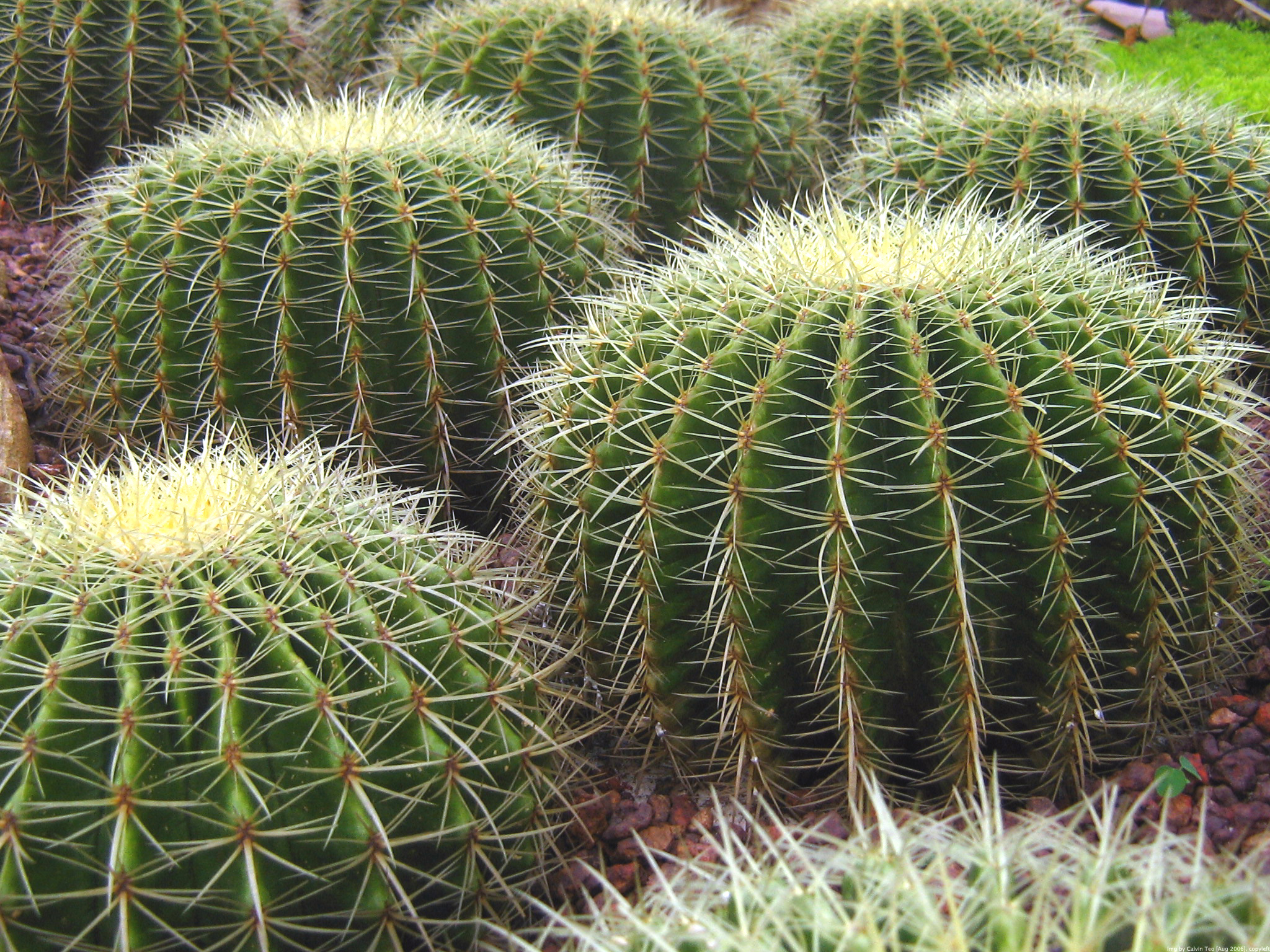
Cultivated cacti in the Singapore Botanic Gardens

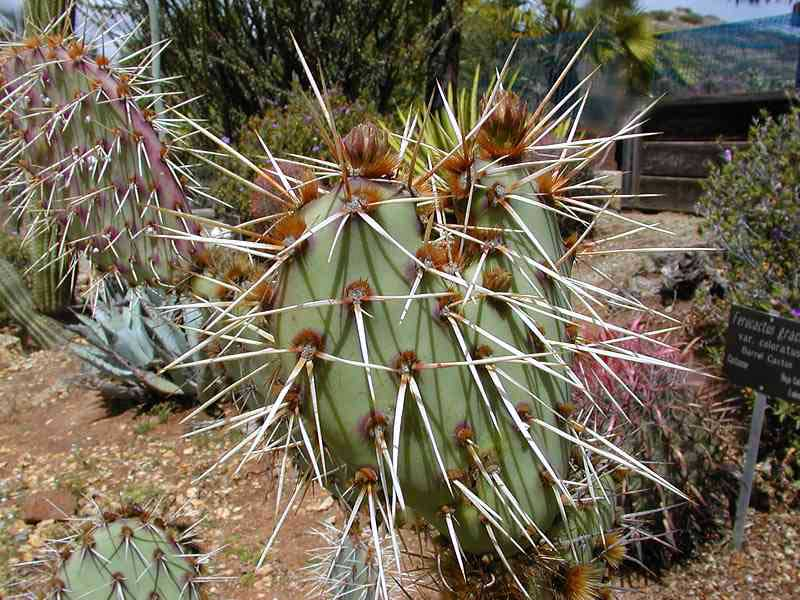
Many species of cactus have long, sharp spines, like this Opuntia.

A cactus (pl.: cacti, cactuses, or less commonly, cactus) is a member of the plant family Cactaceae (/kækˈteɪsi.iː, -ˌaɪ/), (Note: Although the spellings of botanical families have been largely standardized, there is little agreement among botanists as to how these names are to be pronounced. The -aceae suffix can be pronounced /ˈeɪsi.iː/ (AY-see-ee), /ˈeɪsiˌeɪ/ (AY-see-ay), or /ˈeɪsiː/ (AY-see).) a family of the order Caryophyllales comprising about 131-140 genera with some 1,866 up to 2000+ known species. The word cactus derives, through Latin, from the Ancient Greek word κάκτος (káktos), a name originally used by Theophrastus for a spiny plant whose identity is now not certain. Cacti occur in a wide range of shapes and sizes. They are native to the Americas, ranging from Patagonia in the south to parts of western Canada in the north, with the exception of Rhipsalis baccifera, which is also found in Africa and Sri Lanka. Cacti are adapted to live in very dry environments, including the Atacama Desert, one of the driest places on Earth. Because of this, cacti show many adaptations to conserve water. For example, almost all cacti are succulents, meaning they have thickened, fleshy organs adapted to store water. Unlike many other succulents, the stem is the only part of most cacti where water storage takes place. Most species of cacti have lost true leaves, retaining only spines, which are highly modified leaves. As well as defending against herbivores, spines help prevent water loss by reducing air flow close to the cactus and providing some shade. In the absence of true leaves, cacti's enlarged stems carry out photosynthesis. Cactaceae is the 5th most endangered plant or animal family evaluated globally by the International Union for Conservation of Nature.

Cactus spines are produced from specialized structures called areoles, a kind of highly reduced branch. Areoles are an identifying feature of cacti. As well as spines, areoles give rise to flowers, which are usually tubular and multipetaled. Many cacti have short growing seasons and long dormancies and are able to react quickly to any rainfall, helped by an extensive but relatively shallow root system that quickly absorbs any water reaching the ground surface. Cactus stems are often ribbed or fluted with a number of ribs which corresponds to a Fibonacci number (2, 3, 5, 8, 13, 21, 34 etc.). This allows them to expand and contract easily for quick water absorption after rain, followed by retention over long drought periods. Like other succulent plants, most cacti employ a special mechanism called "crassulacean acid metabolism" (CAM) as part of photosynthesis. Transpiration, during which carbon dioxide enters the plant and water escapes, does not take place during the day at the same time as photosynthesis, but instead occurs at night. The plant stores the carbon dioxide it takes in as malic acid, retaining it until daylight returns, and only then using it in photosynthesis. Because transpiration takes place during the cooler, more humid night hours, water loss is significantly reduced.

Many smaller cacti have globe-shaped stems, combining the highest possible volume for water storage with the lowest possible surface area for water loss from transpiration. The tallest (Note: The tallest living cactus is a specimen of Pachycereus pringlei. The tallest cactus ever measured was an armless saguaro cactus which blew over in a windstorm in July 1986; it was 24 metres (78 ft) tall.) free-standing cactus is Pachycereus pringlei, with a maximum recorded height of 19.2 m (63 ft), and the smallest is Blossfeldia liliputiana, only about 1 cm (0.4 in) in diameter at maturity. A fully grown saguaro (Carnegiea gigantea) is said to be able to absorb as much as 760 liters (200 U.S. gal) of water during a rainstorm. A few species differ significantly in appearance from most of the family. At least superficially, plants of the genera Leuenbergeria, Rhodocactus and Pereskia resemble other trees and shrubs growing around them. They have persistent leaves, and when they are older develop bark-covered stems. Their areoles identify them as cacti, and in spite of their appearance, they, too, have many adaptations for water conservation. Leuenbergeria is considered close to the ancestral species from which all cacti evolved. In tropical regions, other cacti grow as forest climbers and epiphytes (plants that grow on trees). Their stems are typically flattened, almost leaf-like in appearance, with fewer or even no spines, such as the well-known Christmas cactus or Thanksgiving cactus (in the genus Schlumbergera).

Cacti have a variety of uses: many species are used as ornamental plants, others are grown for fodder or forage, and others for food (particularly their fruit). Cochineal is the product of an insect that lives on some cacti.

Many succulent plants in both the Old and New World – such as some Euphorbiaceae (euphorbias) – are also spiny stem succulents and because of this are sometimes incorrectly assumed to be cacti, although they are not.

== Morphology ==
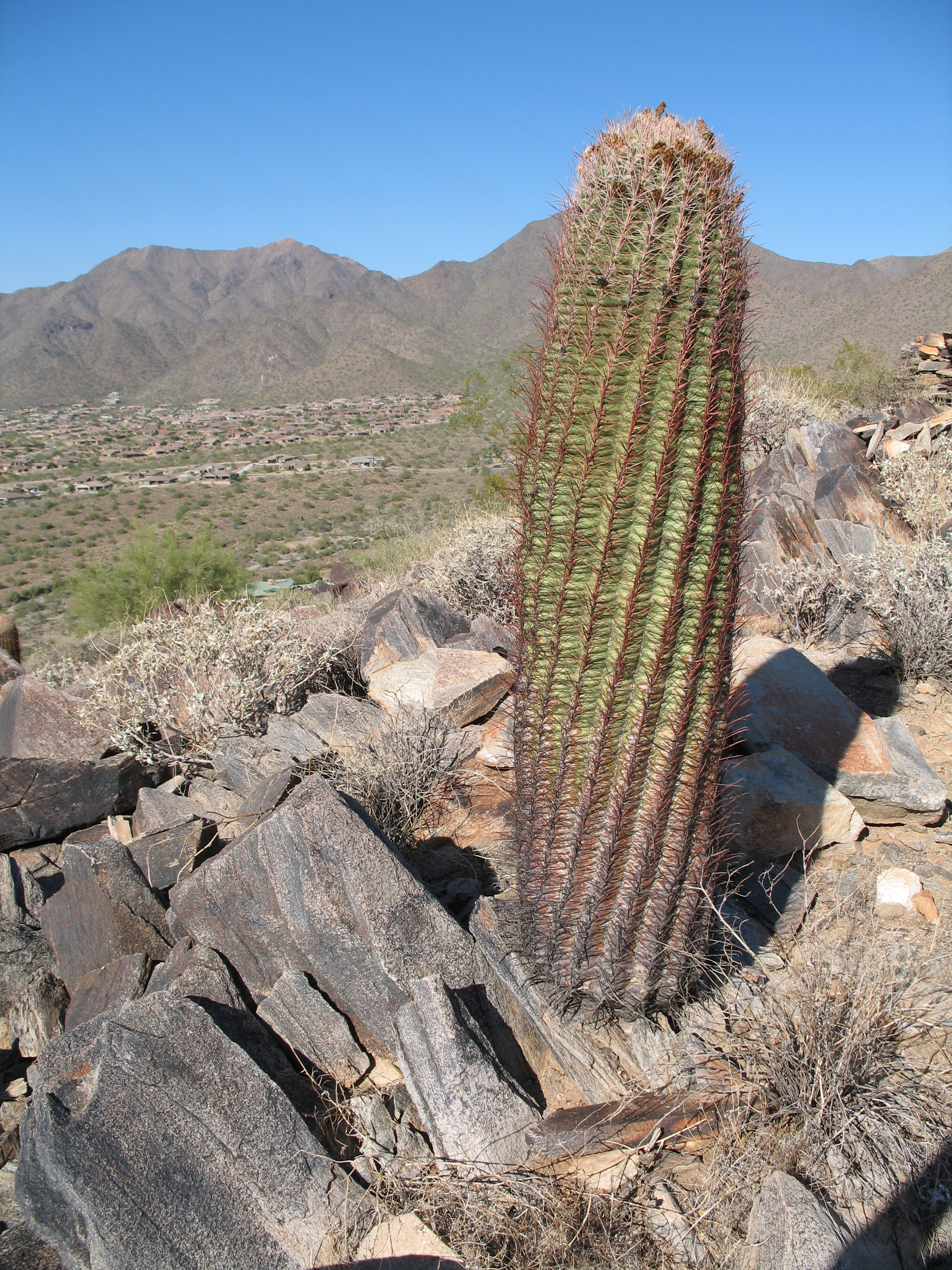
Ferocactus species, a cactoid, in its native Arizona habitat

The 1,500 to 1,800 species of cacti mostly fall into one of two groups of "core cacti": opuntias (subfamily Opuntioideae) and "cactoids" (subfamily Cactoideae). Most members of these two groups are easily recognizable as cacti. They have fleshy succulent stems that are major organs of photosynthesis. They have absent, small, or transient leaves. They have flowers with ovaries that lie below the sepals and petals, often deeply sunken into a fleshy receptacle (the part of the stem from which the flower parts grow). All cacti have areoles—highly specialized short shoots with extremely short internodes that produce spines, normal shoots, and flowers.

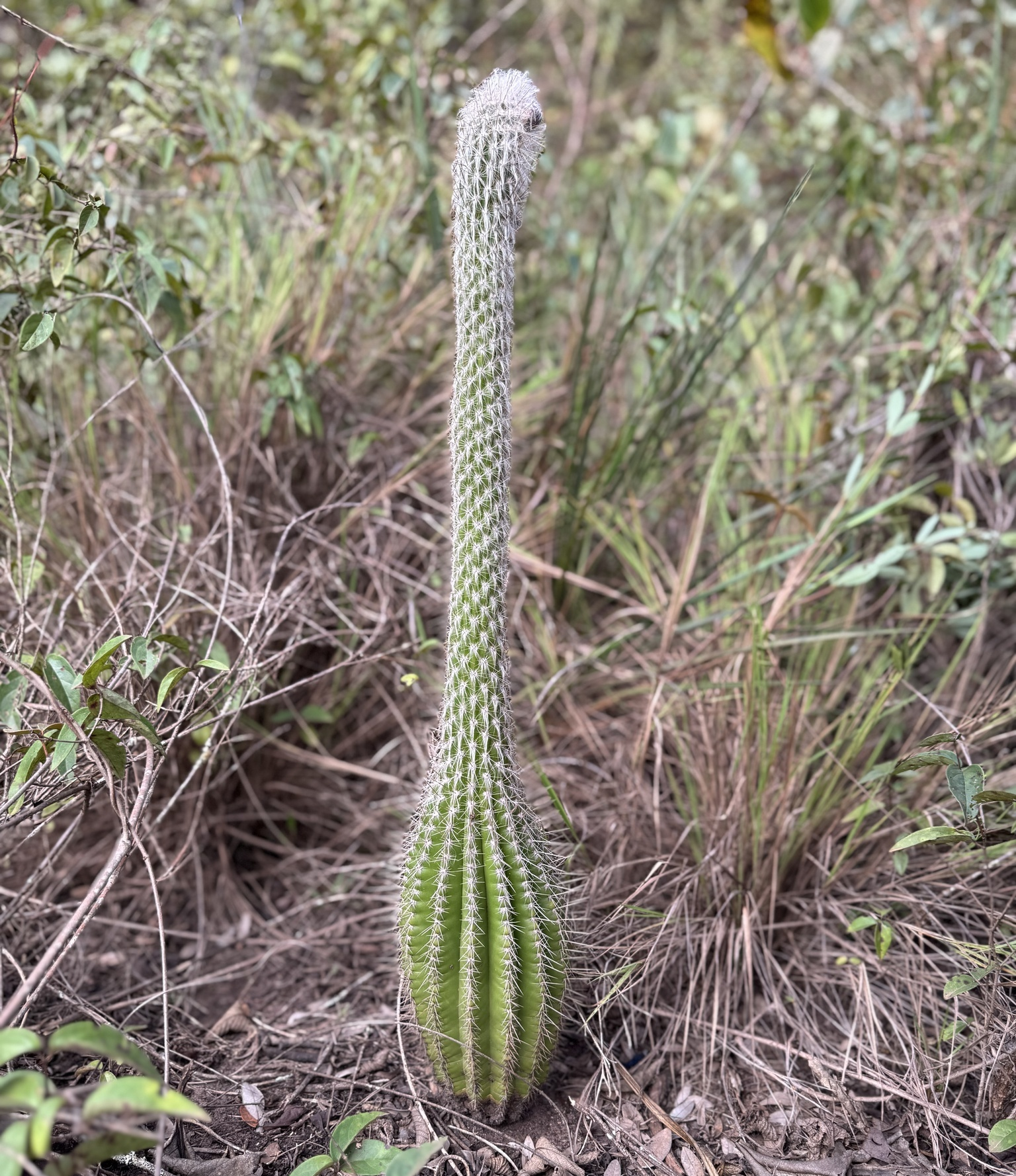
Aberrant form of Lagenosocereus

The remaining cacti fall into only two groups: three tree-like genera, Leuenbergeria, Pereskia and Rhodocactus (all formerly placed in Pereskia), and the much smaller Maihuenia. These two groups are rather different from other cacti, which means any description of cacti as a whole must frequently make exceptions for them. Species of the first three genera superficially resemble other tropical forest trees, in that when mature, they have woody stems that may be covered with bark and long-lasting leaves that provide the main means of photosynthesis. Their flowers may have superior ovaries (i.e., above the points of attachment of the sepals and petals) and areoles that produce further leaves. The two species of Maihuenia have succulent but non-photosynthetic stems and prominent succulent leaves.

=== Growth habit ===
Cacti show a wide variety of growth habits, which are difficult to divide into clear, simple categories.

Arborescent cacti

Cacti can be tree-like (arborescent), meaning they typically have a single more-or-less woody trunk topped by several to many branches. In the genera Leuenbergeria, Pereskia and Rhodocactus, the branches are covered with leaves, so the species of these genera may not be recognized as cacti. In most other cacti, the branches are more typically cactus-like, bare of leaves and bark and covered with spines, as in Pachycereus pringlei or the larger opuntias. Some cacti may become tree-sized but without branches, such as larger specimens of Echinocactus platyacanthus. Cacti may also be described as shrubby, with several stems coming from the ground or from branches very low down, such as in Stenocereus thurberi.

Columnar cacti

Smaller cacti may be described as columnar. They consist of erect, cylinder-shaped stems, which may or may not branch, without a very clear division into trunk and branches. The boundary between columnar forms and tree-like or shrubby forms is difficult to define. Smaller and younger specimens of Cephalocereus senilis, for example, are columnar, whereas older and larger specimens may become tree-like. In some cases, the "columns" may be horizontal rather than vertical. Thus, Stenocereus eruca can be described as columnar even though it has stems growing along the ground, rooting at intervals.

Globular cacti

Cacti whose stems are even smaller may be described as globular (or globose). They consist of shorter, more ball-shaped stems than columnar cacti. Globular cacti may be solitary, such as Ferocactus latispinus, or their stems may form clusters that can create large mounds. All or some stems in a cluster may share a common root.

Other forms

Other cacti have a quite different appearance. In tropical regions, some grow as forest climbers and epiphytes. Their stems are typically flattened and almost leaf-like in appearance, with few or even no spines. Climbing cacti can be very large; a specimen of Hylocereus was reported as 100 meters (330 ft) long from root to the most distant stem. Epiphytic cacti, such as species of Rhipsalis or Schlumbergera, often hang downwards, forming dense clumps where they grow in trees high above the ground.

Growth habits of cacti

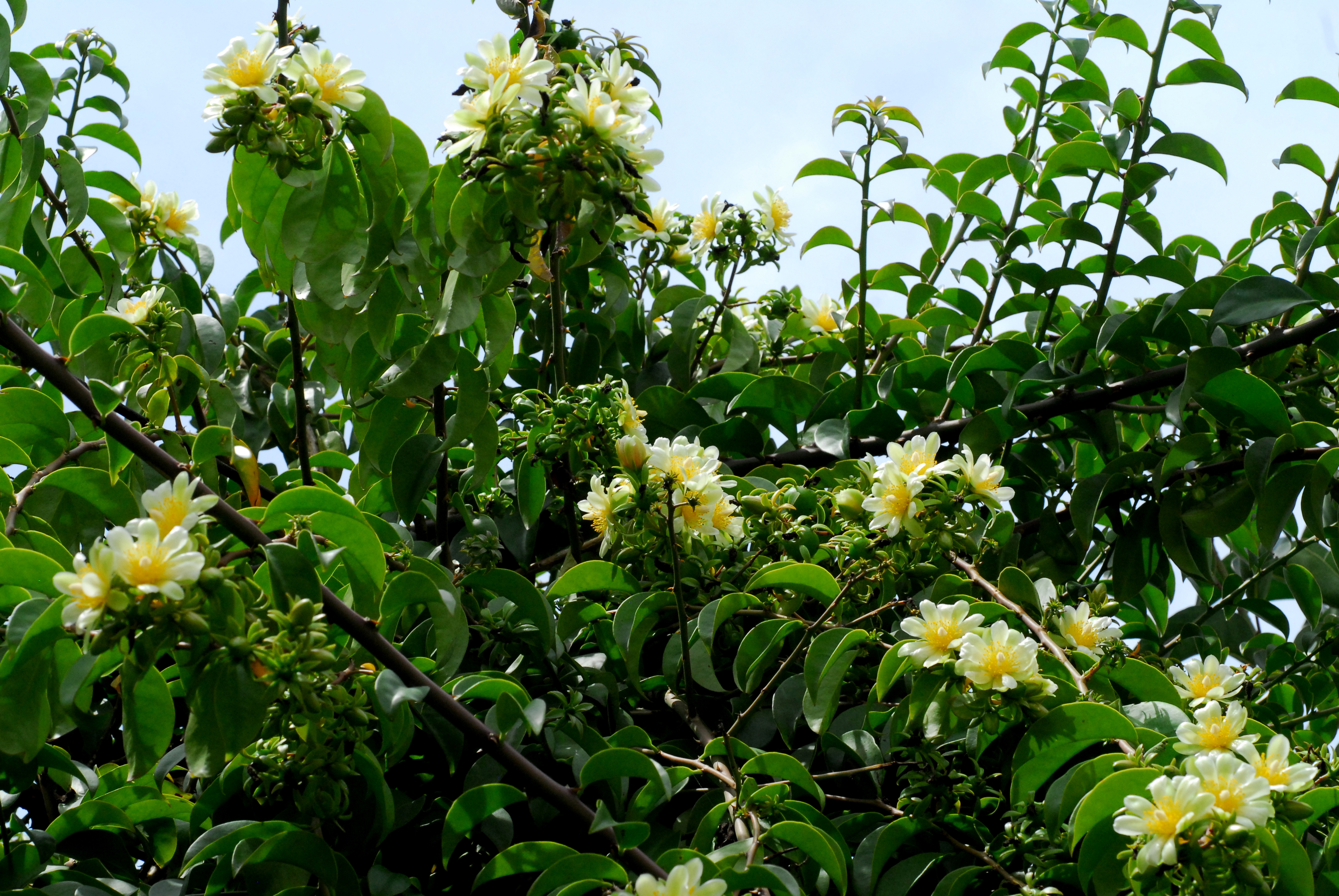
Treelike habit (Pereskia aculeata)

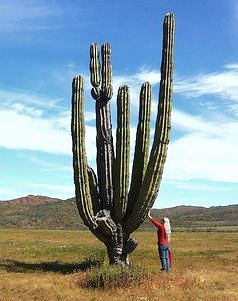
Tall treelike habit (Pachycereus pringlei)

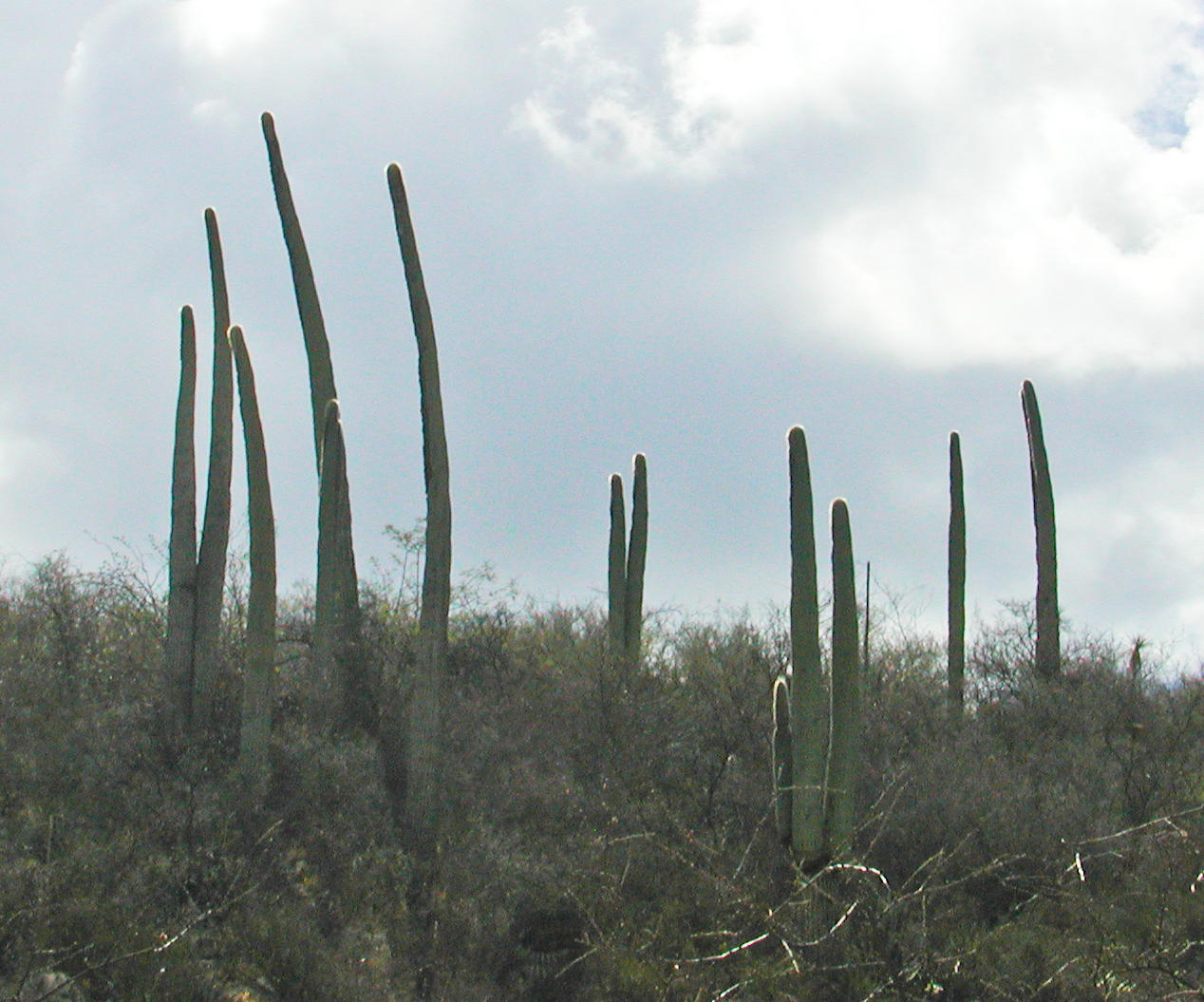
Tall unbranched columnar habit (Cephalocereus)

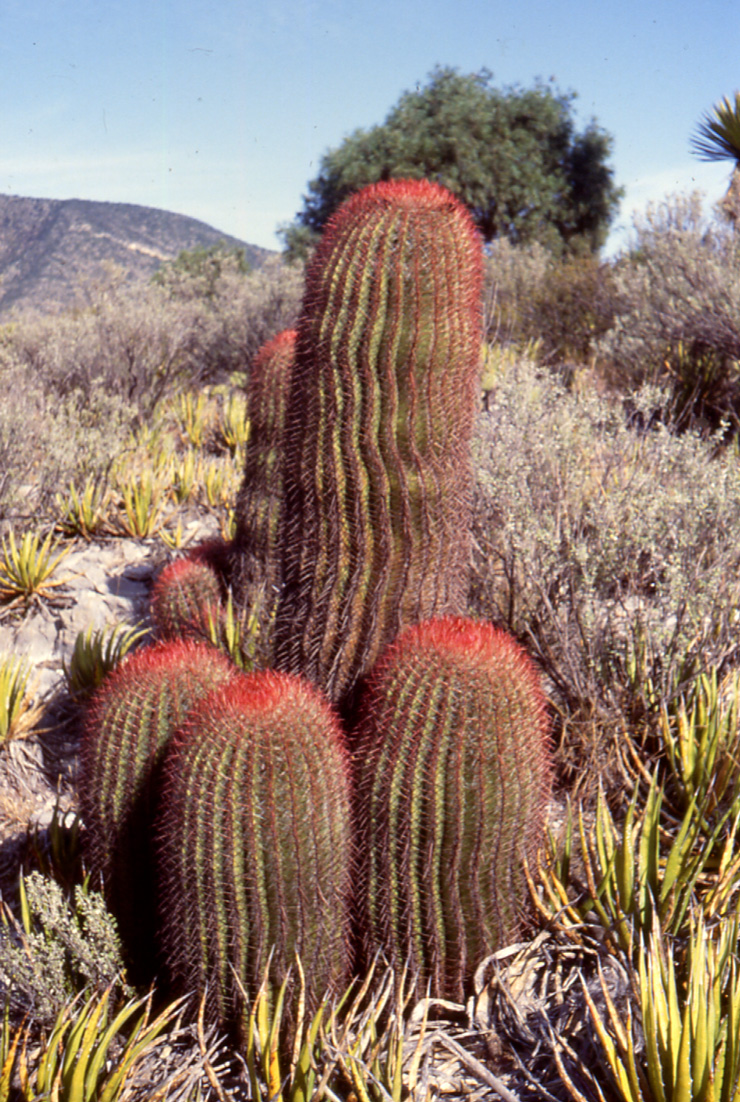
Shorter clustered columnar habit (Ferocactus pilosus)

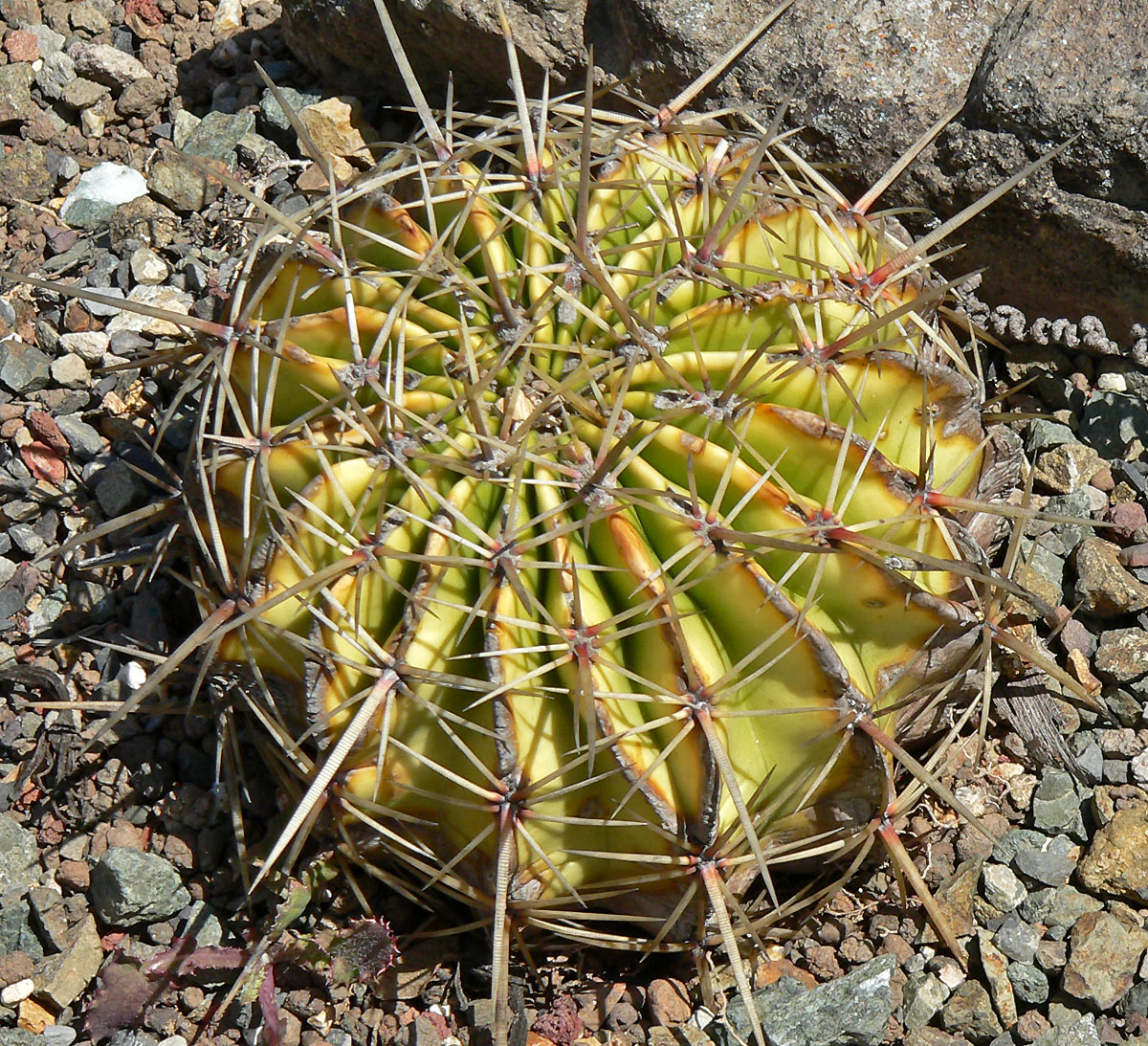
Solitary globular habit (Ferocactus echidne)

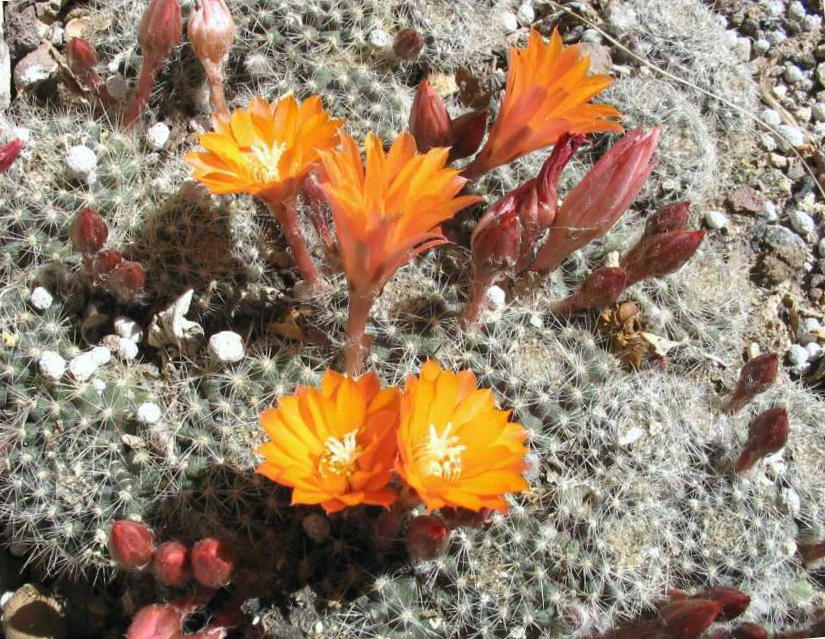
Clustered globular habit (Rebutia species)

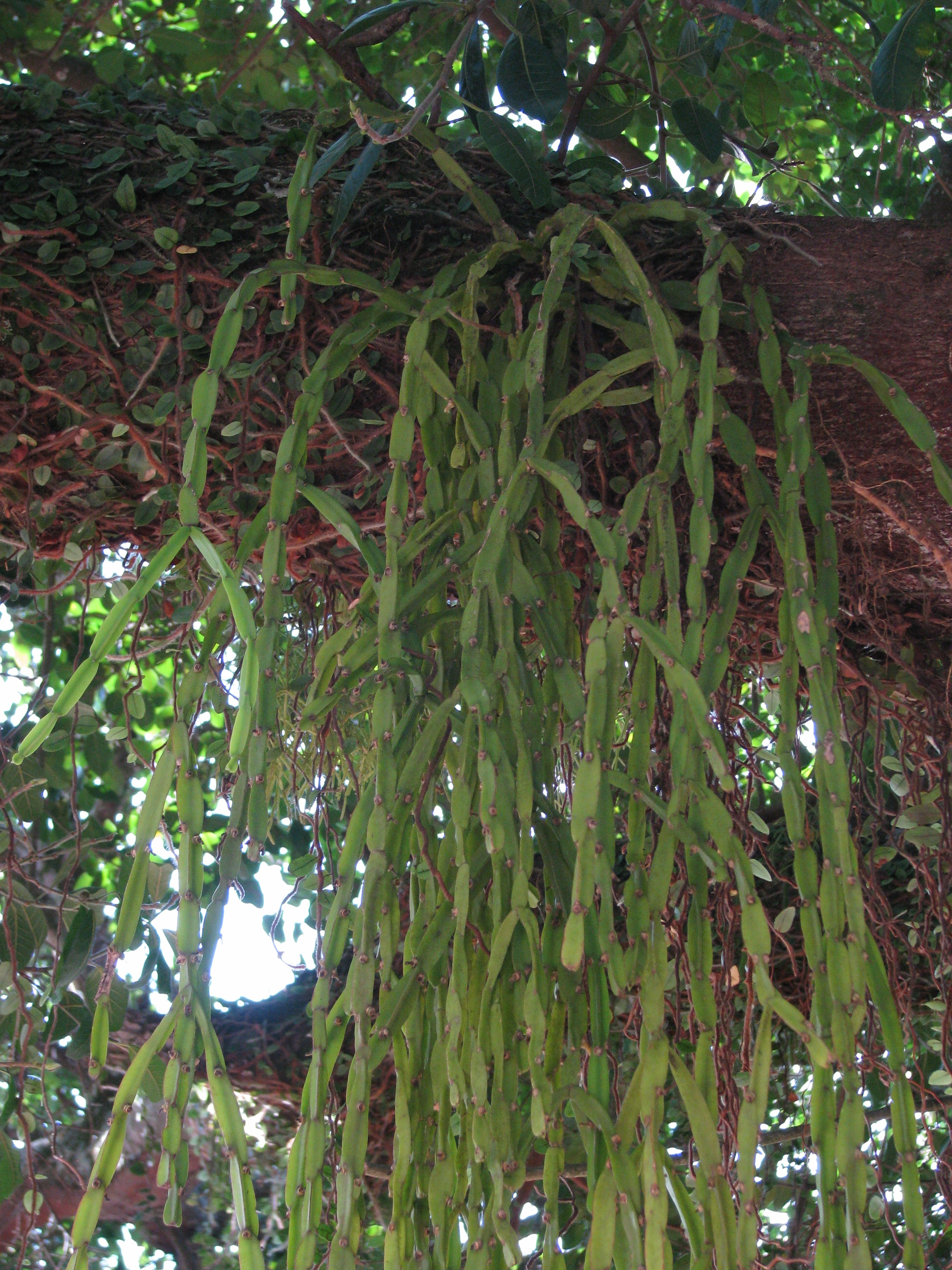
Epiphytic cactus (Rhipsalis paradoxa)

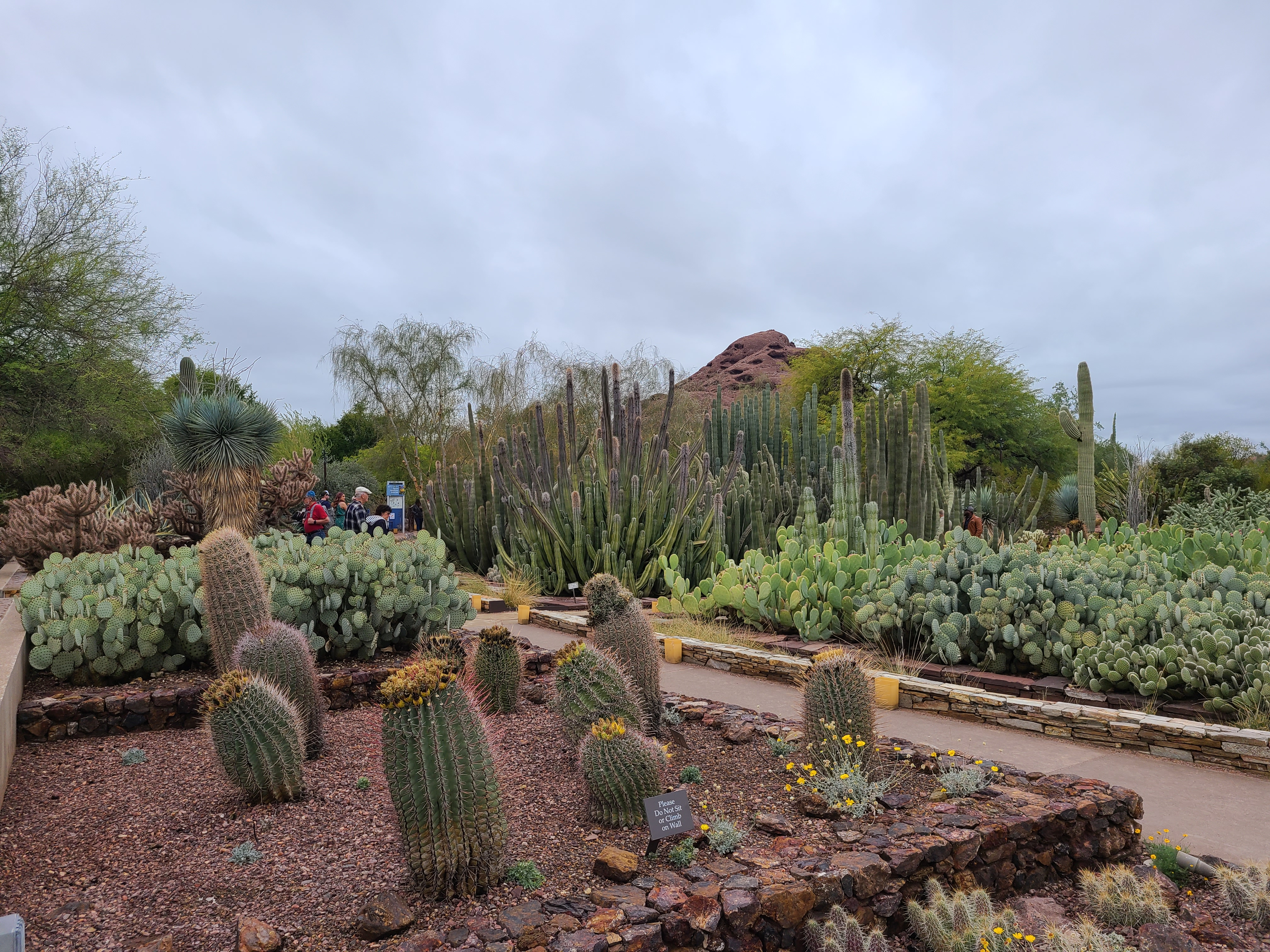
There is a wide variety of cacti at the Desert Botanical Garden

=== Stems ===
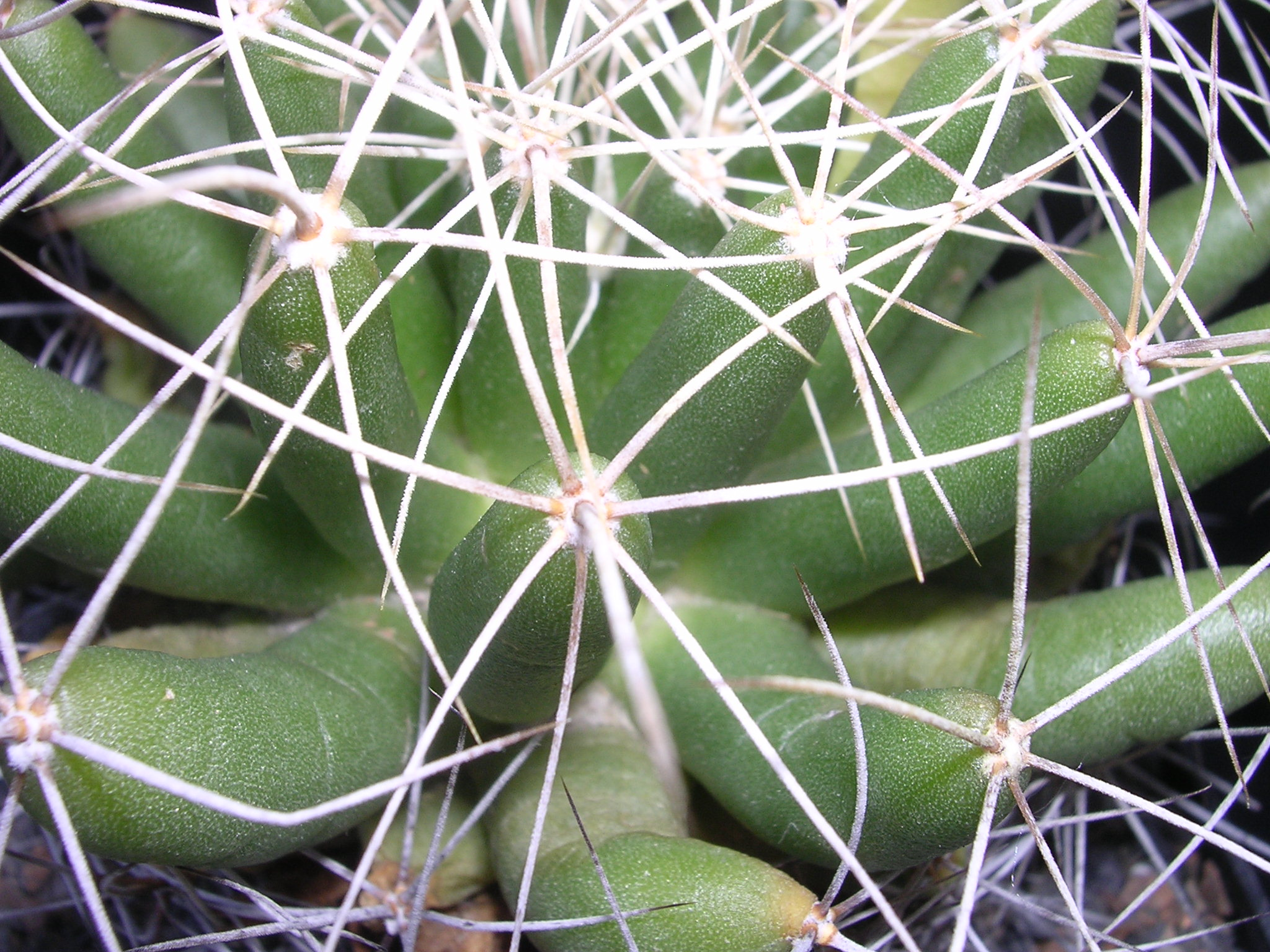
Stem of Mammillaria longimamma, showing tubercles

The leafless, spiny stem is the characteristic feature of the majority of cacti (all belonging to the largest subfamily, the Cactoideae). The stem is typically succulent, meaning it is adapted to store water. The surface of the stem may be smooth (as in some species of Opuntia) or covered with protuberances of various kinds, which are usually called tubercles. These vary from small "bumps" to prominent, nipple-like shapes in the genus Mammillaria and outgrowths almost like leaves in Ariocarpus species. The stem may also be ribbed or fluted in shape. The prominence of these ribs depends on how much water the stem is storing: when full (up to 90% of the mass of a cactus may be water), the ribs may be almost invisible on the swollen stem, whereas when the cactus is short of water and the stems shrink, the ribs may be very visible.

The stems of most cacti are some shade of green, often bluish or brownish green. Such stems contain chlorophyll and are able to carry out photosynthesis; they also have stomata (small structures that can open and close to allow passage of gases). Cactus stems are often visibly waxy.

=== Areoles ===
Cactus areoles

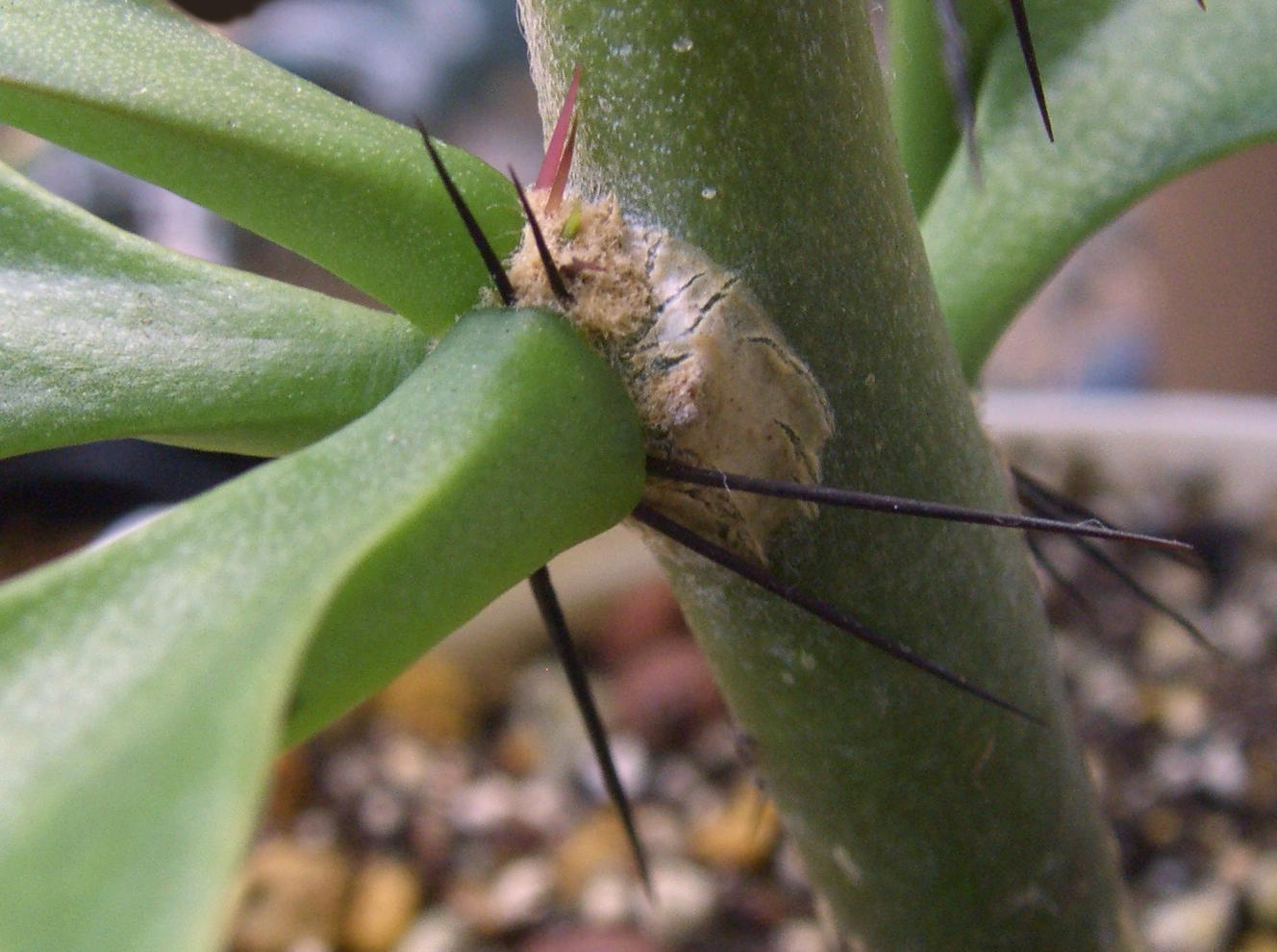
Areole of Rhodocactus grandifolius showing its position relative to leaves

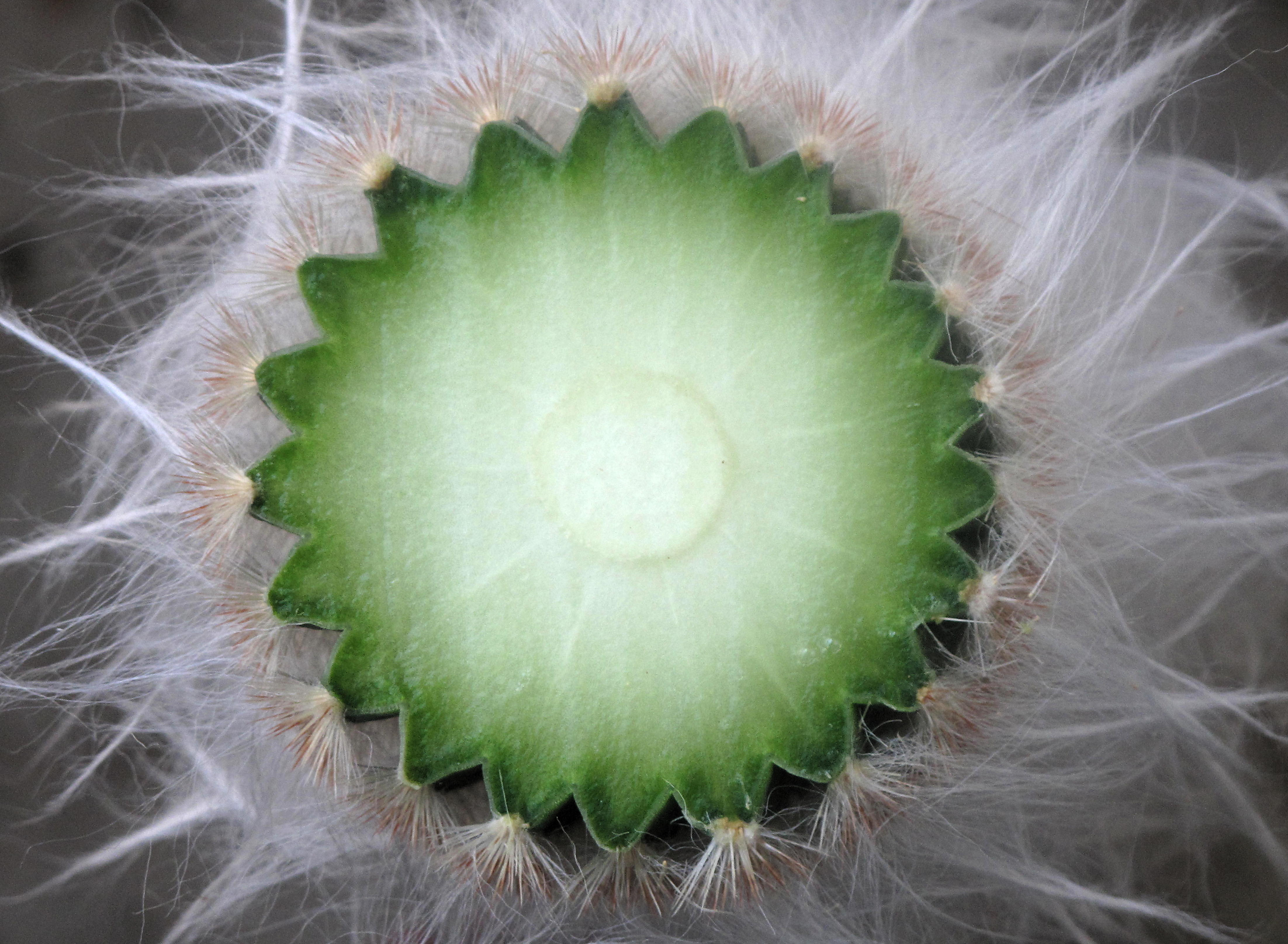
Cross-section of Cereus showing areoles with spines and wool

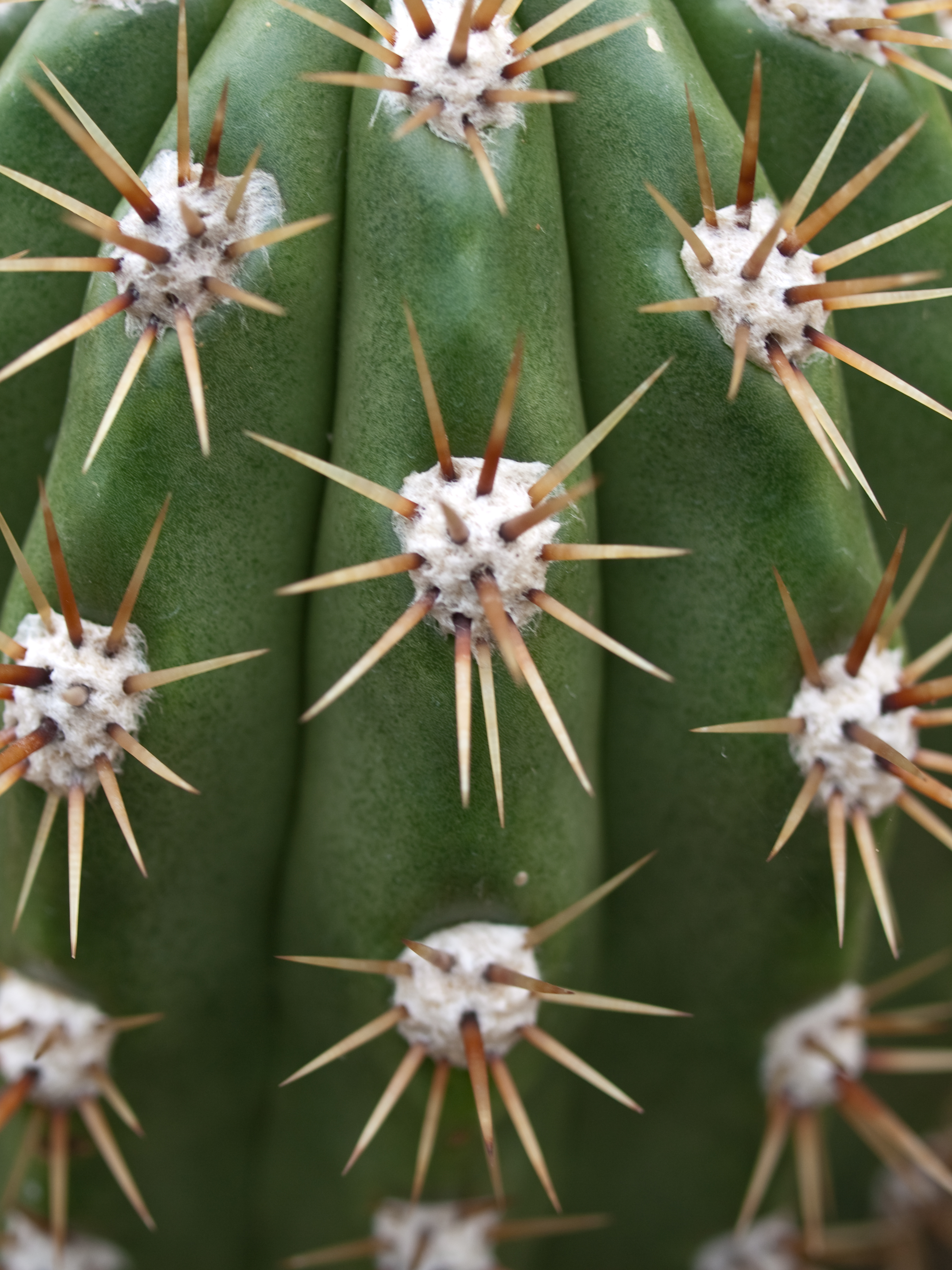
Areoles of an Echinopsis species

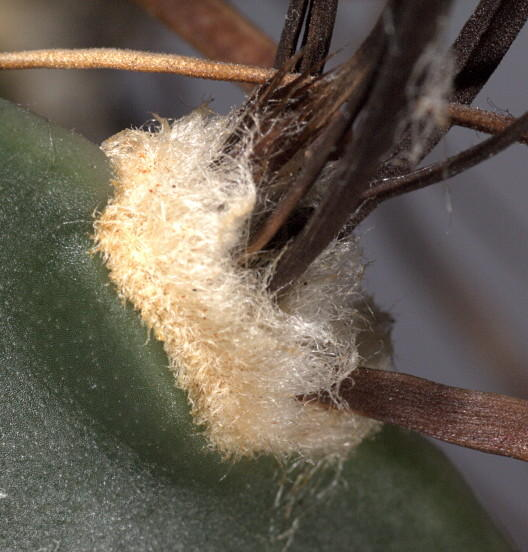
Close-up of an areole of Astrophytum capricorne showing fine wool

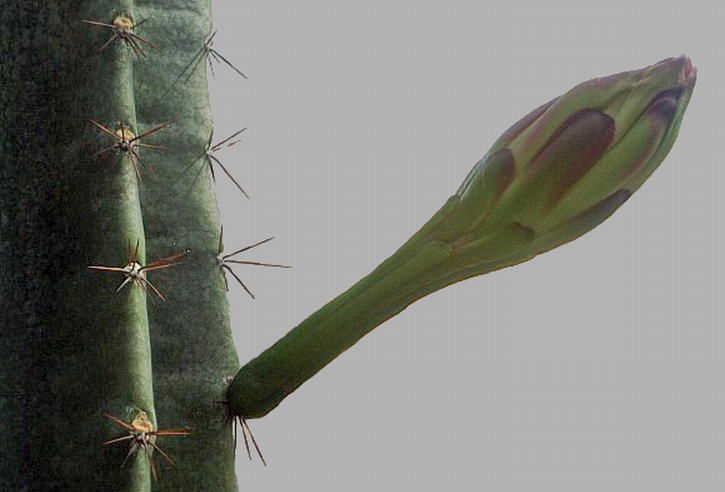
Flowers appear from the upper part of an areole, spines from the lower (Cereus species).

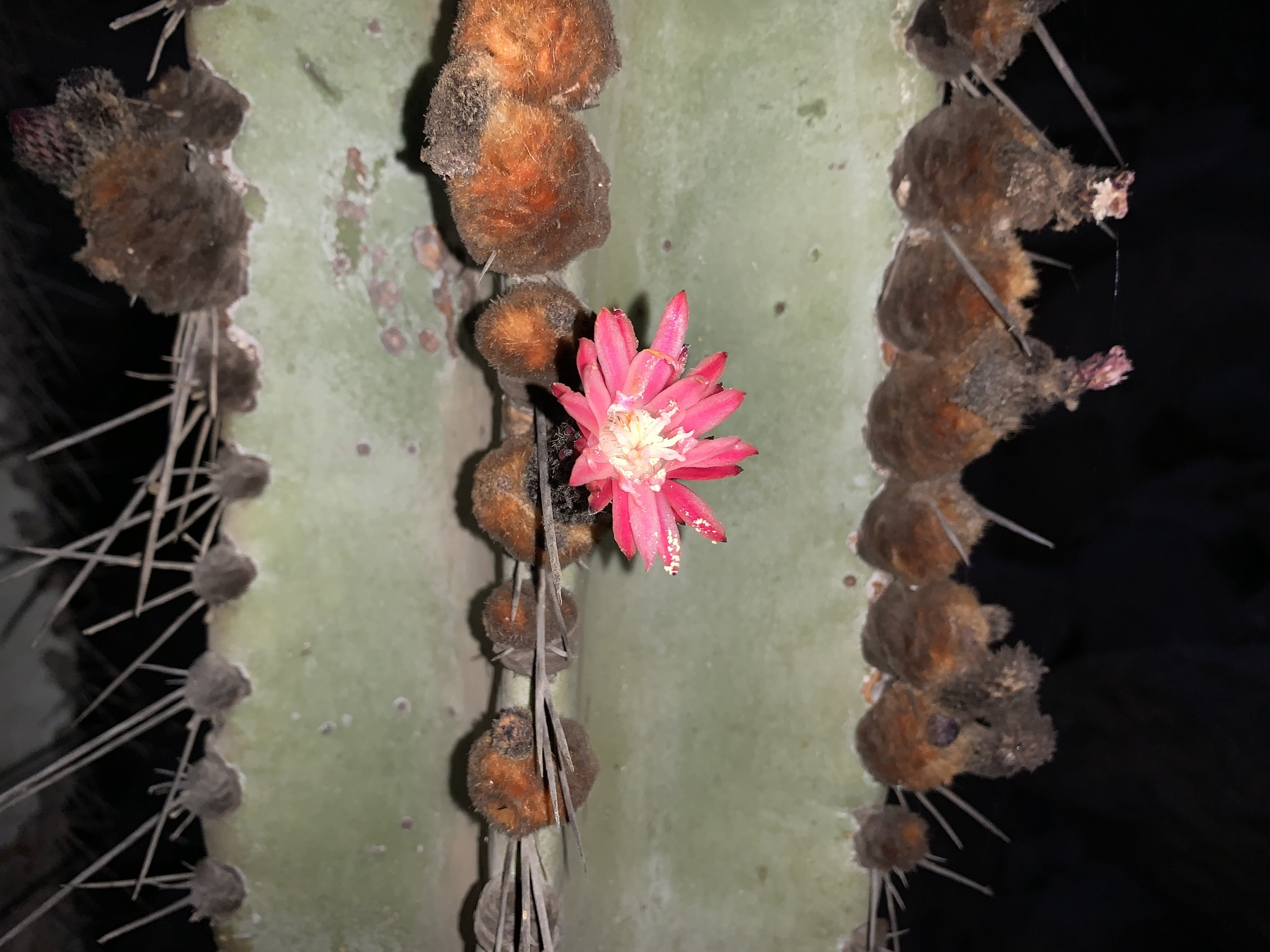
unique areoles of Neoraimondia arequipensis

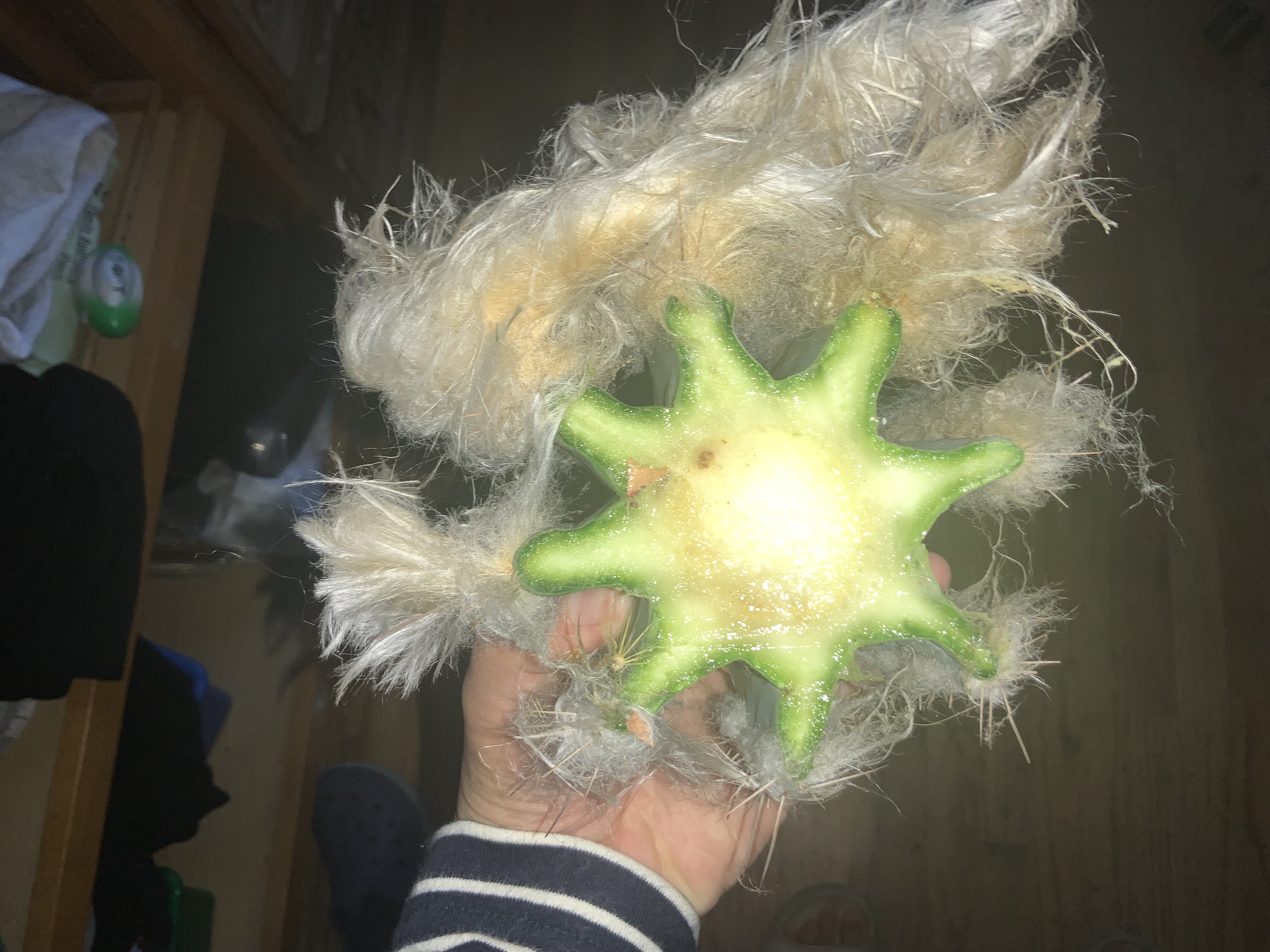
Cross section of Pilosocereus leucocephalus showing Cephalium areoles

Areoles are structures unique to cacti. Although variable, they typically appear as woolly or hairy areas on the stems from which spines emerge. Flowers are also produced from areoles. In the genus Leuenbergeria, believed similar to the ancestor of all cacti, the areoles occur in the axils of leaves (i.e. in the angle between the leaf stalk and the stem). In leafless cacti, areoles are often borne on raised areas on the stem where leaf bases would have been.

Areoles are highly specialized and very condensed shoots or branches. In a normal shoot, nodes bearing leaves or flowers would be separated by lengths of stem (internodes). In an areole, the nodes are so close together, they form a single structure. The areole may be circular, elongated into an oval shape, or even separated into two parts; the two parts may be visibly connected in some way (e.g. by a groove in the stem) or appear entirely separate (a dimorphic areole). The part nearer the top of the stem then produces flowers, the other part spines. Areoles often have multicellular hairs (trichomes) that give the areole a hairy or woolly appearance, sometimes of a distinct color such as yellow or brown.

In most cacti, the areoles produce new spines or flowers only for a few years and then become inactive. This results in a relatively fixed number of spines, with flowers being produced only from the ends of stems, which are still growing and forming new areoles. In Pereskia, a genus close to the ancestor of cacti, areoles remain active for much longer; this is also the case in Opuntia and Neoraimondia.

=== Leaves ===
The great majority of cacti have no visible leaves; photosynthesis takes place in the stems (which may be flattened and leaflike in some species). Exceptions occur in three (taxonomically, four) groups of cacti. All the species of Leuenbergeria, Pereskia and Rhodocactus are superficially like normal trees or shrubs and have numerous leaves with a midrib and a flattened blade (lamina) on either side. This group is paraphyletic, forming two taxonomic clades. Many cacti in the opuntia group (subfamily Opuntioideae) also have visible leaves, which may be long-lasting (as in Pereskiopsis species) or produced only during the growing season and then lost (as in many species of Opuntia). The small genus Maihuenia also relies on leaves for photosynthesis. The structure of the leaves varies somewhat between these groups. Opuntioids and Maihuenia have leaves that appear to consist only of a midrib.

Even those cacti without visible photosynthetic leaves do usually have very small leaves, less than 0.5 mm (0.02 in) long in about half of the species studied and almost always less than 1.5 mm (0.06 in) long. The function of such leaves cannot be photosynthesis; a role in the production of plant hormones, such as auxin, and in defining axillary buds has been suggested.

=== Spines ===
Botanically, "spines" are distinguished from "thorns": spines are modified leaves, and thorns are modified branches. Cacti produce spines, always from areoles as noted above. Spines are present even in those cacti with leaves, such as Pereskia, Pereskiopsis and Maihuenia, so they clearly evolved before complete leaflessness. Some cacti only have spines when young, possibly only when seedlings. This is particularly true of tree-living cacti, such as Rhipsalis and Schlumbergera, but also of some ground-living cacti, such as Ariocarpus.

The spines of cacti are often useful in identification, since they vary greatly between species in number, color, size, shape and hardness, as well as in whether all the spines produced by an areole are similar or whether they are of distinct kinds. Most spines are straight or at most slightly curved, and are described as hair-like, bristle-like, needle-like or awl-like, depending on their length and thickness. Some cacti have flattened spines (e.g. Sclerocactus papyracanthus). Other cacti have hooked spines. Sometimes, one or more central spines are hooked, while outer spines are straight (e.g., Mammillaria rekoi).

In addition to normal-length spines, members of the subfamily Opuntioideae have relatively short spines, called glochids, that are barbed along their length and easily shed. These enter the skin and are difficult to remove due to being very fine and easily broken, causing long-lasting irritation.

Cactus spines

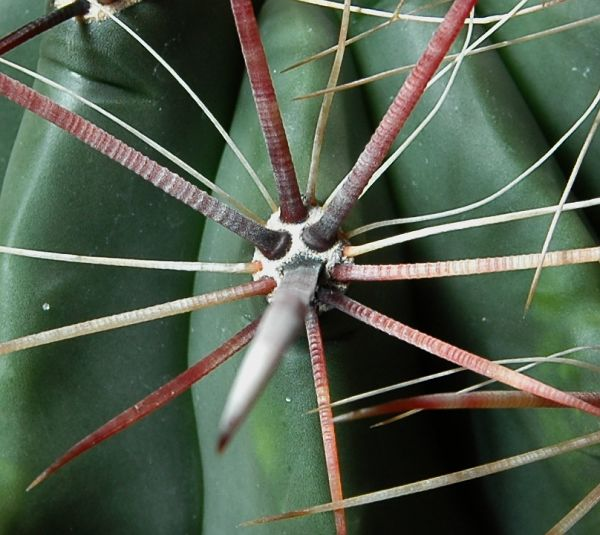
Varied spines of a Ferocactus

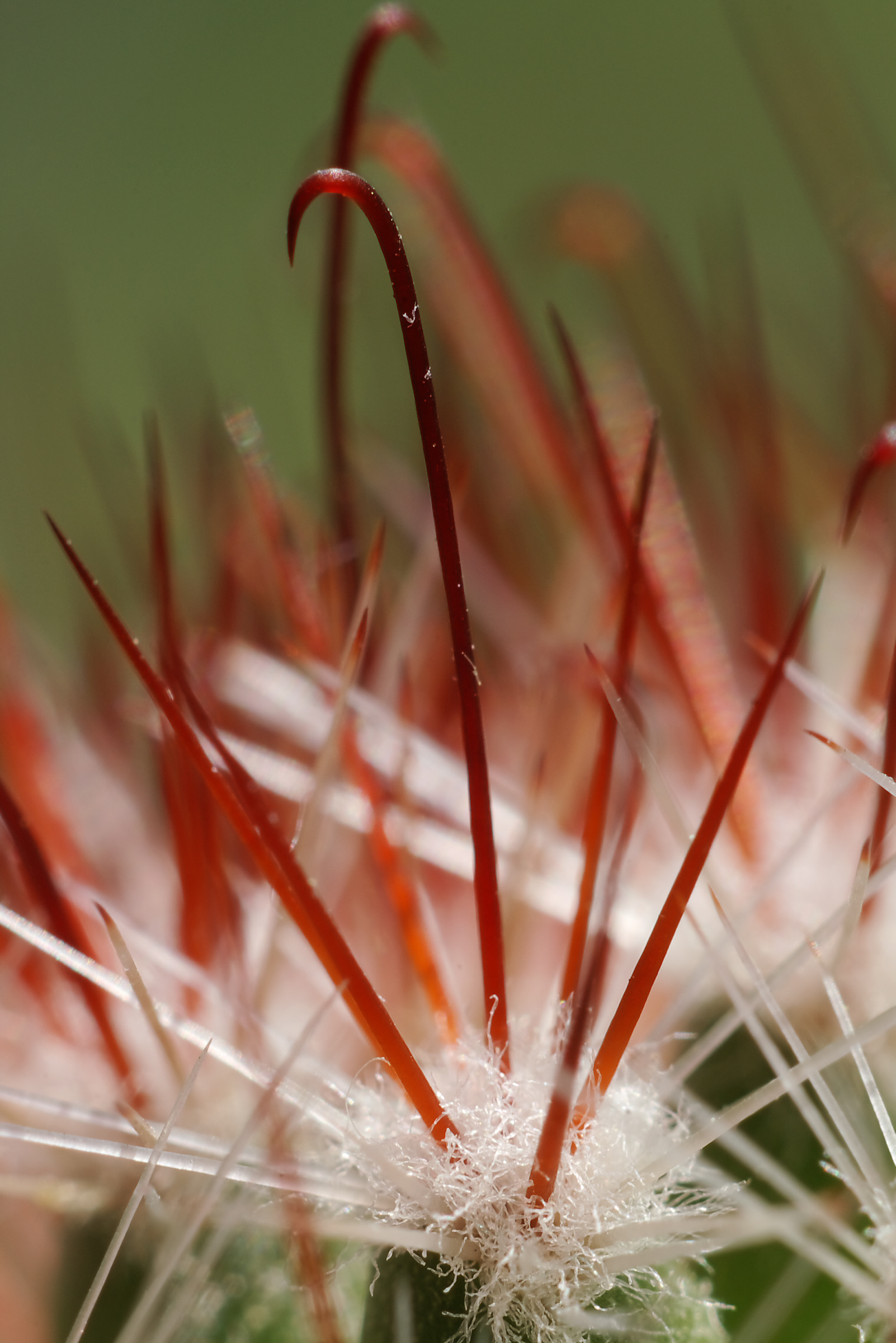
Hooked central spine (cf. Mammillaria rekoi)

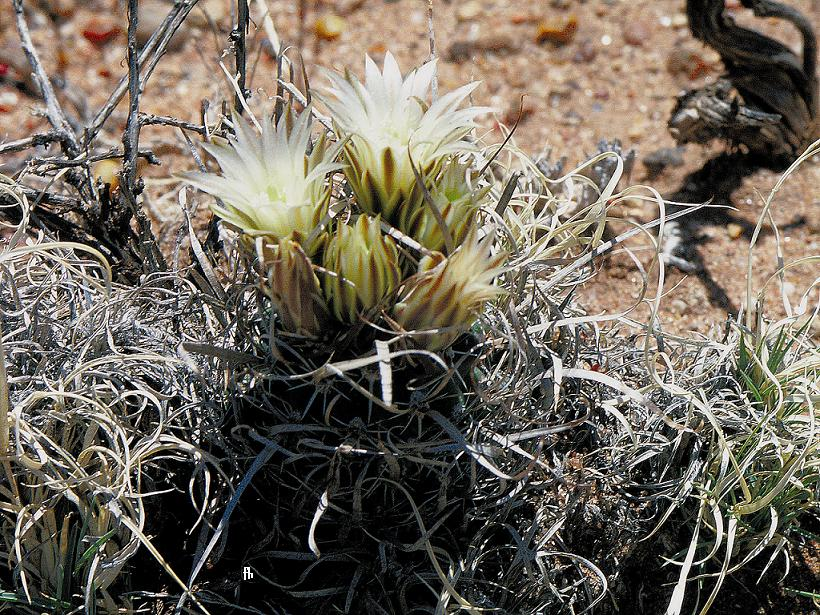
Unusual flattened spines of Sclerocactus papyracanthus

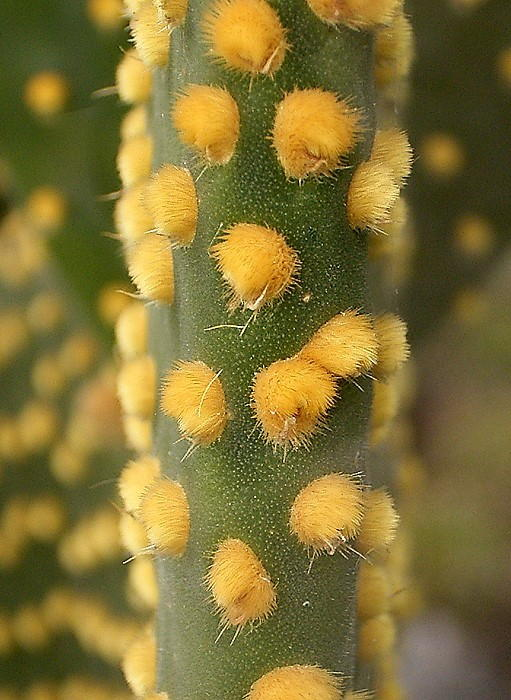
Glochids of Opuntia microdasys

=== Roots ===
Most ground-living cacti have only fine roots, which spread out around the base of the plant for varying distances, close to the surface. Some cacti have taproots; in genera such as Ariocarpus, these are considerably larger and of a greater volume than the body. Taproots may aid in stabilizing the larger columnar cacti. Climbing, creeping and epiphytic cacti may have only adventitious roots, produced along the stems where these come into contact with a rooting medium.

=== Flowers ===
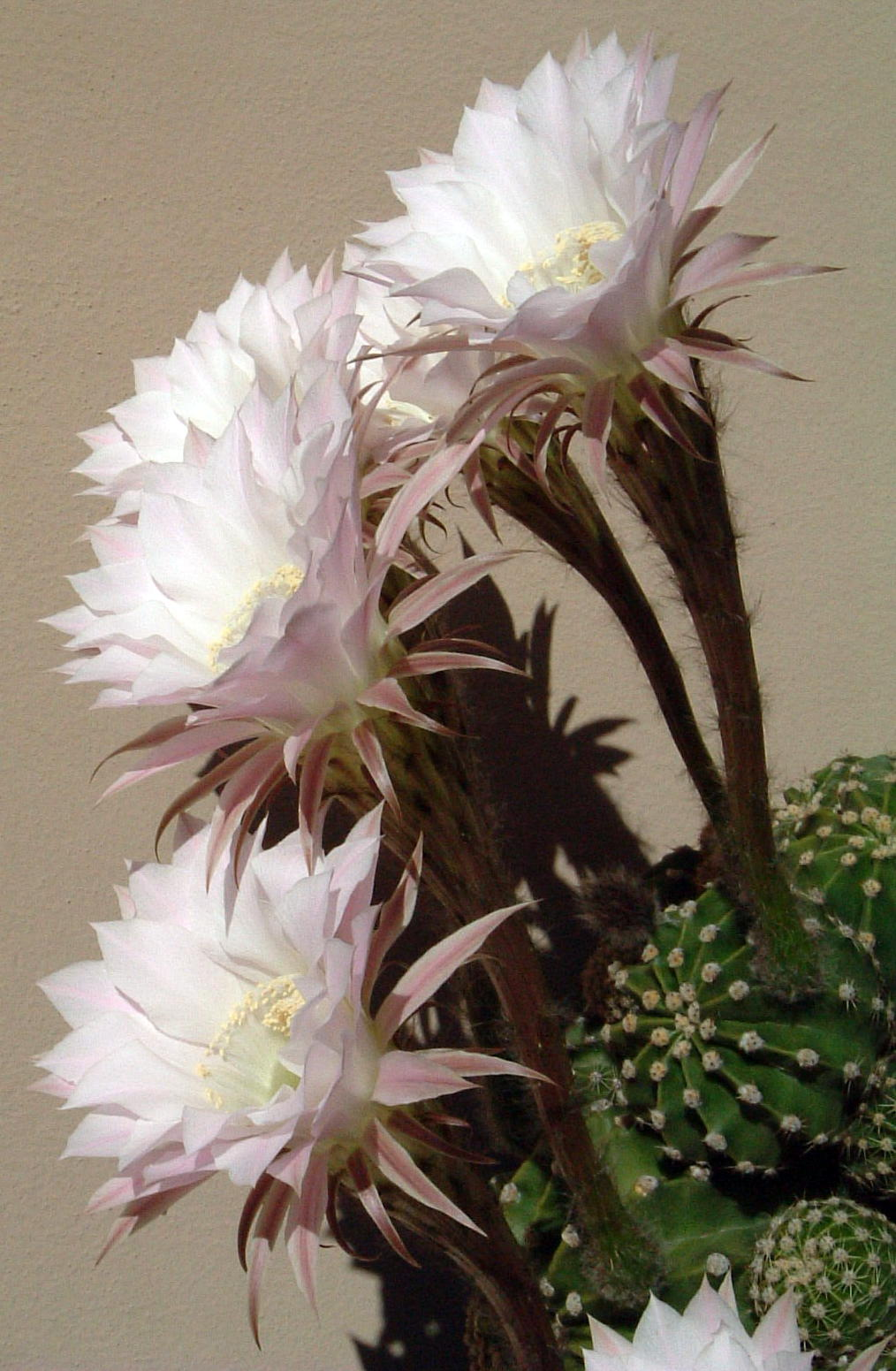
Large flowers of an Echinopsis

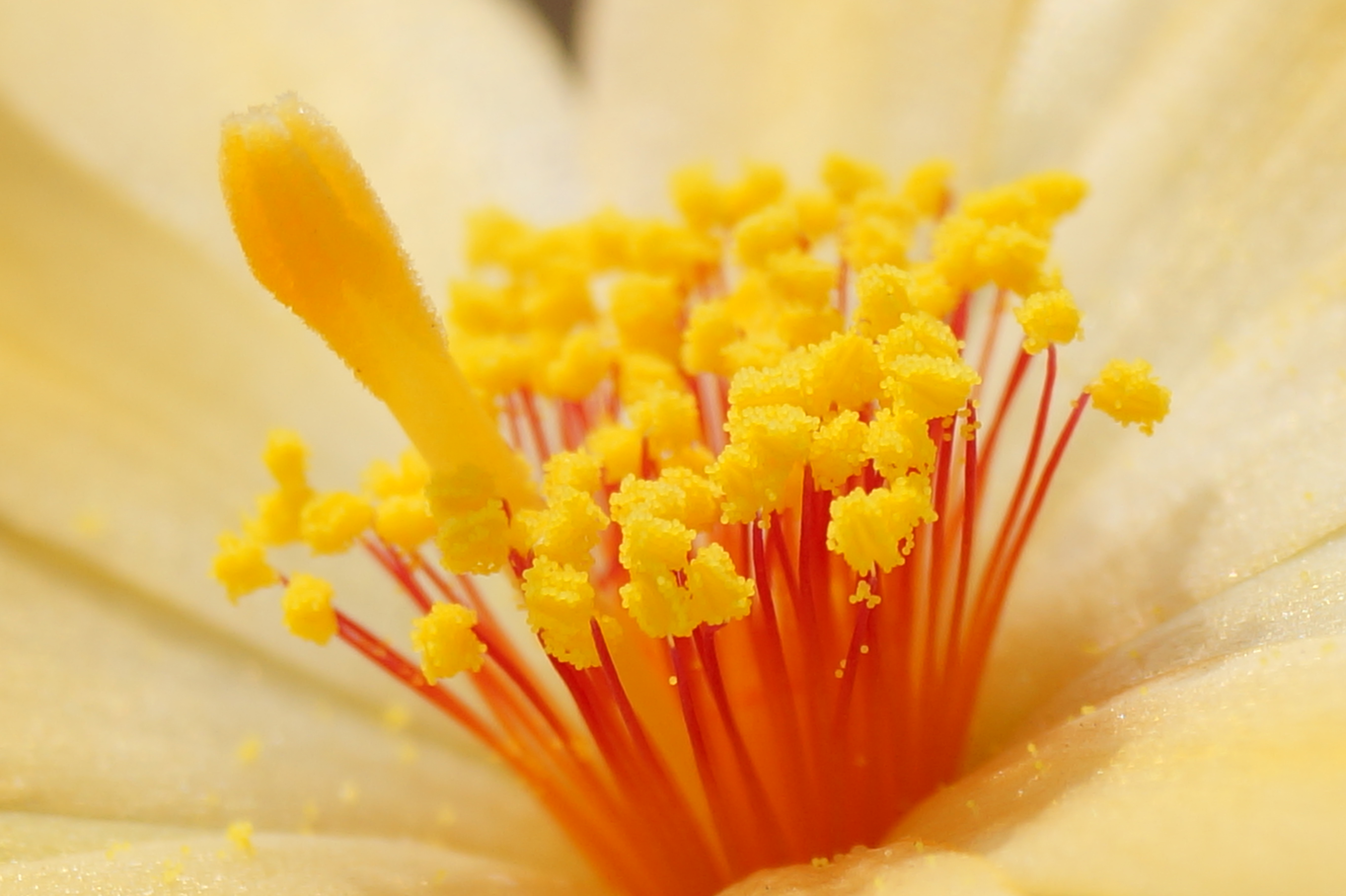
Style and stamens of Mammillaria beneckei flower

Like their spines, cactus flowers are variable. Typically, the ovary is surrounded by material derived from stem or receptacle tissue, forming a structure called a pericarpel. Tissue derived from the petals and sepals continues the pericarpel, forming a composite tube—the whole may be called a floral tube, although strictly speaking only the part furthest from the base is floral in origin. The outside of the tubular structure often has areoles that produce wool and spines. Typically, the tube also has small scale-like bracts, which gradually change into sepal-like and then petal-like structures, so the sepals and petals cannot be clearly differentiated (and hence are often called "tepals"). Some cacti produce floral tubes without wool or spines (e.g. Gymnocalycium) or completely devoid of any external structures (e.g. Mammillaria). Unlike the flowers of most other cacti, Pereskia flowers may be borne in clusters.

Cactus flowers usually have many stamens, but only a single style, which may branch at the end into more than one stigma. The stamens usually arise from all over the inner surface of the upper part of the floral tube, although in some cacti, the stamens are produced in one or more distinct "series" in more specific areas of the inside of the floral tube.

The flower as a whole is usually radially symmetrical (actinomorphic), but may be bilaterally symmetrical (zygomorphic) in some species. Flower colors range from white through yellow and red to magenta.

== Adaptations for water conservation ==
All cacti have some adaptations to promote efficient water use. Most cacti—opuntias and cactoids—specialize in surviving in hot and dry environments (i.e. are xerophytes), but the first ancestors of modern cacti were already adapted to periods of intermittent drought. A small number of cactus species in the tribes Hylocereeae and Rhipsalideae have become adapted to life as climbers or epiphytes, often in tropical forests, where water conservation is less important.

=== Leaves and spines ===
The absence of visible leaves is one of the most striking features of most cacti. Pereskia (which is close to the ancestral species from which all cacti evolved) does have long-lasting leaves, which are, however, thickened and succulent in many species. Other species of cactus with long-lasting leaves, such as the opuntioid Pereskiopsis, also have succulent leaves. A key issue in retaining water is the ratio of surface area to volume. Water loss is proportional to surface area, whereas the amount of water present is proportional to volume. Structures with a high surface area-to-volume ratio, such as thin leaves, necessarily lose water at a higher rate than structures with a low area-to-volume ratio, such as thickened stems.

Spines, which are modified leaves, are present on even those cacti with true leaves, showing the evolution of spines preceded the loss of leaves. Although spines have a high surface area-to-volume ratio, at maturity they contain little or no water, being composed of fibers made up of dead cells. Spines provide protection from herbivores and camouflage in some species, and assist in water conservation in several ways. They trap air near the surface of the cactus, creating a moister layer that reduces evaporation and transpiration. They can provide some shade, which lowers the temperature of the surface of the cactus, also reducing water loss. When sufficiently moist air is present, such as during fog or early morning mist, spines can condense moisture, which then drips onto the ground and is absorbed by the roots.

=== Stems ===
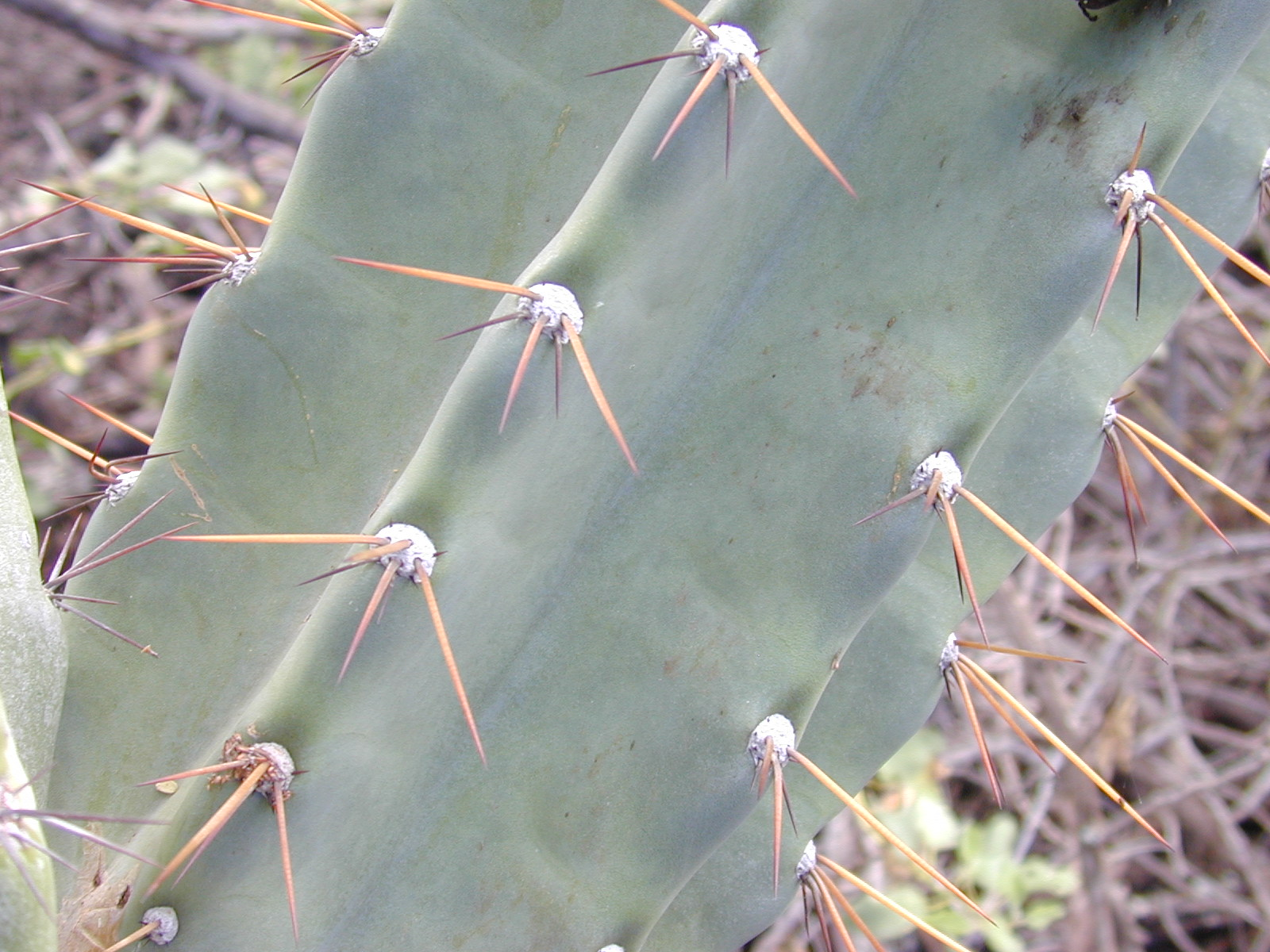
Stem of young Cereus hildmannianus subsp. uruguayanus, showing ribbing and waxy coating

The majority of cacti are stem succulents, i.e., plants in which the stem is the main organ used to store water. Water may form up to 90% of the total mass of a cactus. Stem shapes vary considerably among cacti. The cylindrical shape of columnar cacti and the spherical shape of globular cacti produce a low surface area-to-volume ratio, thus reducing water loss, as well as minimizing the heating effects of sunlight. The ribbed or fluted stems of many cacti allow the stem to shrink during periods of drought and then swell as it fills with water during periods of availability. A mature saguaro (Carnegiea gigantea) is said to be able to absorb as much as 760 liters (200 U.S. gal) of water during a rainstorm. The outer layer of the stem usually has a tough cuticle, reinforced with waxy layers, which reduce water loss. These layers are responsible for the grayish or bluish tinge to the stem color of many cacti.

The stems of most cacti have adaptations to allow them to conduct photosynthesis in the absence of leaves. This is discussed further below under Metabolism.

=== Roots ===
Many cacti have roots that spread out widely, but only penetrate a short distance into the soil. In one case, a young saguaro only 12 cm (4.7 in) tall had a root system with a diameter of 2 m (7 ft), but no more than 10 cm (4 in) deep. Cacti can also form new roots quickly when rain falls after a drought. The concentration of salts in the root cells of cacti is relatively high. All these adaptations enable cacti to absorb water rapidly during periods of brief or light rainfall. Thus, Ferocactus cylindraceus reportedly can take up a significant amount of water within 12 hours from as little as 7 mm (0.3 in) of rainfall, becoming fully hydrated in a few days.

Although in most cacti, the stem acts as the main organ for storing water, some cacti have in addition large taproots. These may be several times the length of the above-ground body in the case of species such as Copiapoa atacamensis, which grows in one of the driest places in the world, the Atacama Desert in northern Chile.

=== Metabolism ===
Photosynthesis requires plants to take in carbon dioxide gas (CO_{2}). As they do so, they lose water through transpiration. Like other types of succulents, cacti reduce this water loss by the way in which they carry out photosynthesis. "Normal" leafy plants use the C_{3} mechanism: during daylight hours, CO_{2} is continually drawn out of the air present in spaces inside leaves and converted first into a compound containing three carbon atoms (3-phosphoglycerate) and then into products such as carbohydrates. The access of air to internal spaces within a plant is controlled by stomata, which are able to open and close. The need for a continuous supply of CO_{2} during photosynthesis means the stomata must be open, so water vapor is continuously being lost. Plants using the C_{3} mechanism lose as much as 97% of the water taken up through their roots in this way. A further problem is that as temperatures rise, the enzyme that captures CO_{2} starts to capture more and more oxygen instead, reducing the efficiency of photosynthesis by up to 25%.

Schematic illustration of CAM

Night: stomata open; CO_{2} enters and is stored as malic acid; water vapor is able to escape.

Day: stomata close; malic acid is converted back to CO_{2} and used to make carbohydrate; water vapor is confined.

Crassulacean acid metabolism (CAM) is a mechanism adopted by cacti and other succulents to avoid the problems of the C_{3} mechanism. In full CAM, the stomata open only at night, when temperatures and water loss are lowest. CO_{2} enters the plant and is captured in the form of organic acids stored inside cells (in vacuoles). The stomata remain closed throughout the day, and photosynthesis uses only this stored CO_{2}. CAM uses water much more efficiently at the price of limiting the amount of carbon fixed from the atmosphere and thus available for growth. CAM-cycling is a less water-efficient system whereby stomata open in the day, just as in plants using the C_{3} mechanism. At night, or when the plant is short of water, the stomata close and the CAM mechanism is used to store CO_{2} produced by respiration for use later in photosynthesis. CAM-cycling is present in Pereskia species.

By studying the ratio of ^{14}C to ^{13}C incorporated into a plant—its isotopic signature—it is possible to deduce how much CO_{2} is taken up at night and how much in the daytime. Using this approach, most of the Pereskia species investigated exhibit some degree of CAM-cycling, suggesting this ability was present in the ancestor of all cacti. Pereskia leaves are claimed to only have the C_{3} mechanism with CAM restricted to stems. More recent studies show that "it is highly unlikely that significant carbon assimilation occurs in the stem"; Pereskia species are described as having "C_{3} with inducible CAM." Leafless cacti carry out all their photosynthesis in the stem, using full CAM. As of February 2012, it is not clear whether stem-based CAM evolved once only in the core cacti, or separately in the opuntias and cactoids; CAM is known to have evolved convergently many times.

To carry out photosynthesis, cactus stems have undergone many adaptations. Early in their evolutionary history, the ancestors of modern cacti (other than Leuenbergeria species) developed stomata on their stems and began to delay developing bark. However, this alone was not sufficient; cacti with only these adaptations appear to do very little photosynthesis in their stems. Stems needed to develop structures similar to those normally found only in leaves. Immediately below the outer epidermis, a hypodermal layer developed made up of cells with thickened walls, offering mechanical support. Air spaces were needed between the cells to allow carbon dioxide to diffuse inwards. The center of the stem, the cortex, developed "chlorenchyma" – a plant tissue made up of relatively unspecialized cells containing chloroplasts, arranged into a "spongy layer" and a "palisade layer" where most of the photosynthesis occurs.

== Taxonomy and classification ==
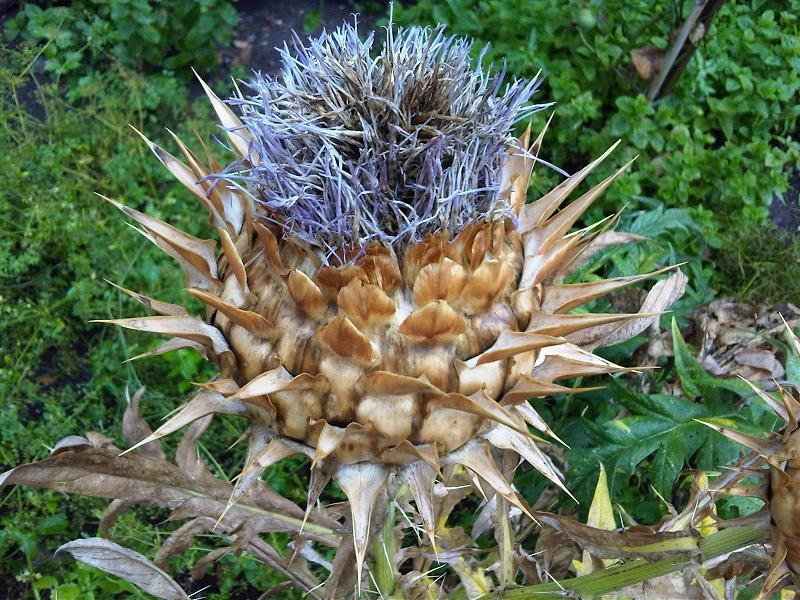
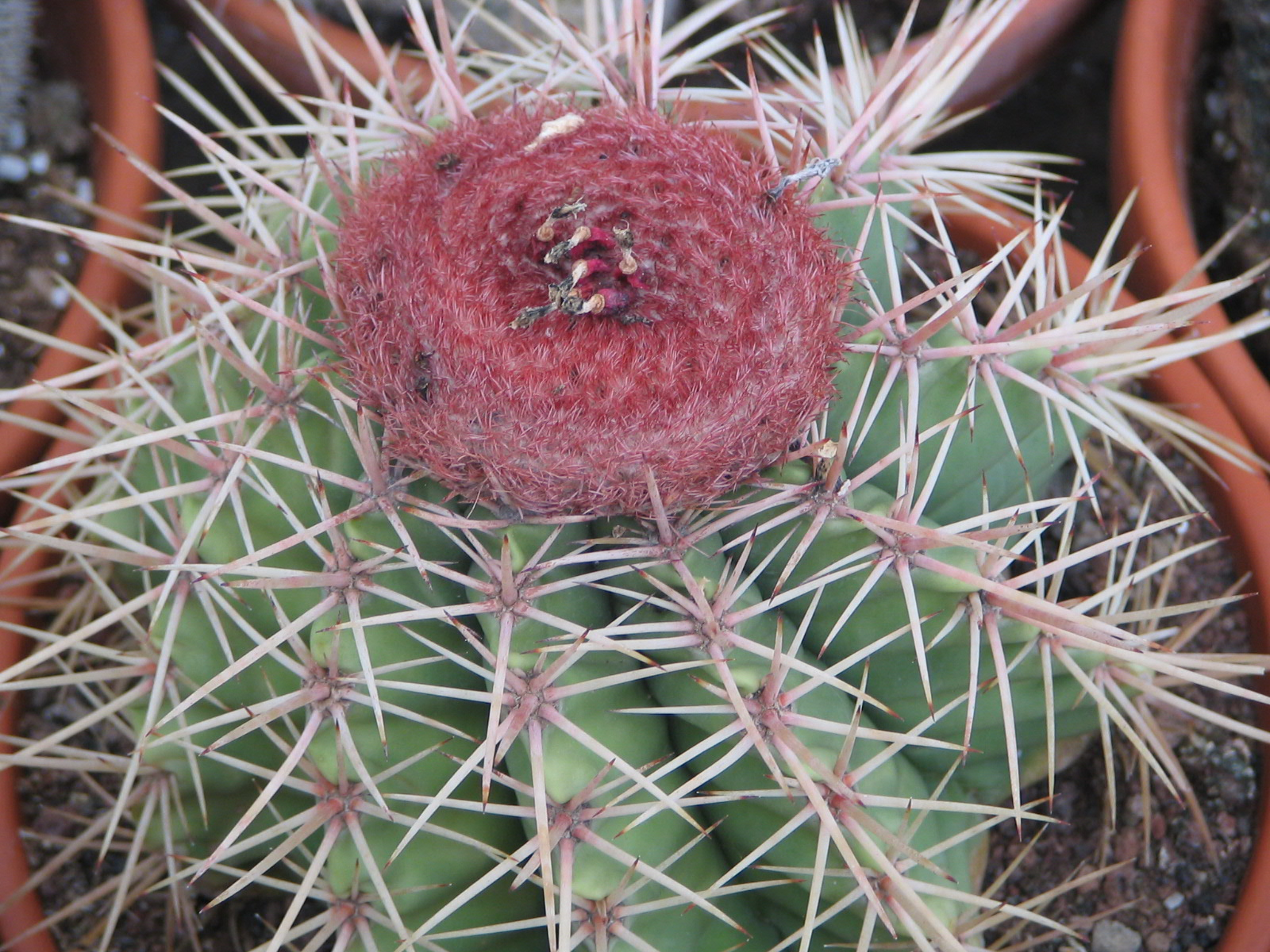
(Above) The spiny heads of the cardoon, possibly once known as "cactus";
(below) A Melocactus, likely the first genus seen by Europeans

Naming and classifying cacti has been both difficult and controversial since the first encounters with them by western observers. The difficulties began with Carl Linnaeus. In 1737, he placed the cacti he knew into two genera, Cactus and Pereskia. However, when he published Species Plantarum in 1753—the starting point for modern botanical nomenclature—he relegated them all to one genus, Cactus. The word "cactus" is derived through Latin from the Ancient Greek κάκτος (kaktos), a name used by Theophrastus for a spiny plant, which may have been the cardoon (Cynara cardunculus).

Later botanists, such as Philip Miller in 1754, divided cacti into several genera, which, in 1789, Antoine Laurent de Jussieu placed in his newly created family Cactaceae. By the early 20th century, botanists came to feel Linnaeus's name Cactus had become so confused as to its meaning (was it the genus or the family?) that it should not be used as a genus name. The 1905 Vienna botanical congress rejected the name Cactus and instead declared Mammillaria was the type genus of the family Cactaceae. It did, however, conserve the name Cactaceae, leading to the unusual situation in which the family Cactaceae no longer contains the genus after which it was named.

The difficulties continued, partly because giving plants scientific names relies on "type specimens". Ultimately, if botanists want to know whether a particular plant is an example of, say, Mammillaria mammillaris, they should be able to compare it with the type specimen to which this name is permanently attached. Type specimens are normally prepared by compression and drying, after which they are stored in herbaria to act as definitive references. However, cacti are very difficult to preserve in this way; they have evolved to resist drying and their bodies do not easily compress. A further difficulty is that many cacti were given names by growers and horticulturalists rather than botanists; as a result, the provisions of the International Code of Nomenclature for algae, fungi, and plants (which governs the names of cacti, as well as other plants) were often ignored. Curt Backeberg, in particular, is said to have named or renamed 1,200 species without one of his names ever being attached to a specimen, which, according to David Hunt, ensured he "left a trail of nomenclatural chaos that will probably vex cactus taxonomists for centuries."

=== Classification ===
In 1984, it was decided that the Cactaceae Section of the International Organization for Succulent Plant Study should set up a working party, now called the International Cactaceae Systematics Group (ICSG), to produce consensus classifications down to the level of genera. Their system has been used as the basis of subsequent classifications. Detailed treatments published in the 21st century have divided the family into around 125–130 genera and 1,400–1,500 species, which are then arranged into a number of tribes and subfamilies. The ICSG classification of the cactus family recognized four subfamilies, the largest of which was divided into nine tribes. The subfamilies were:

The four cactus subfamilies

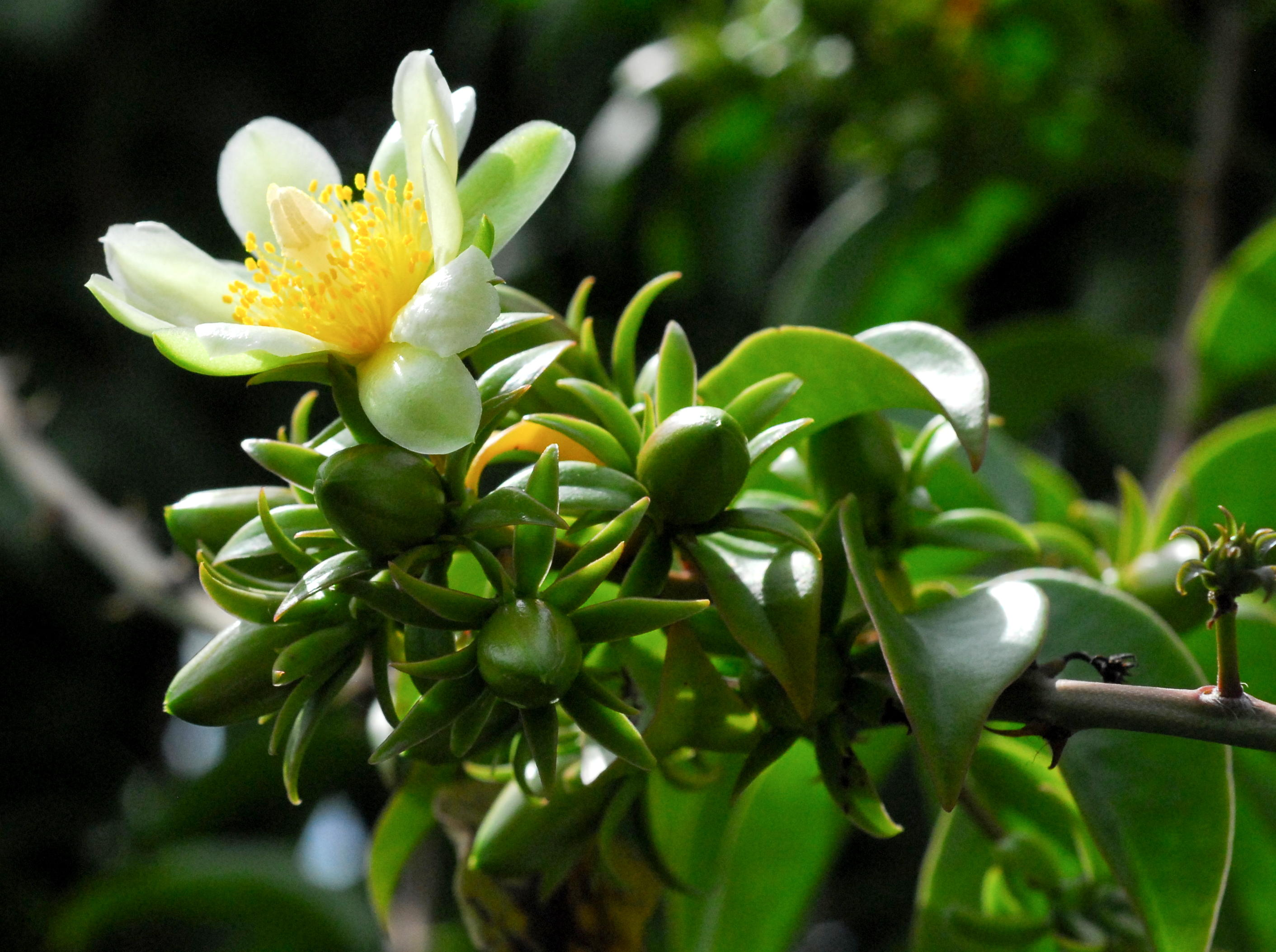
Pereskioideae: Pereskia aculeata

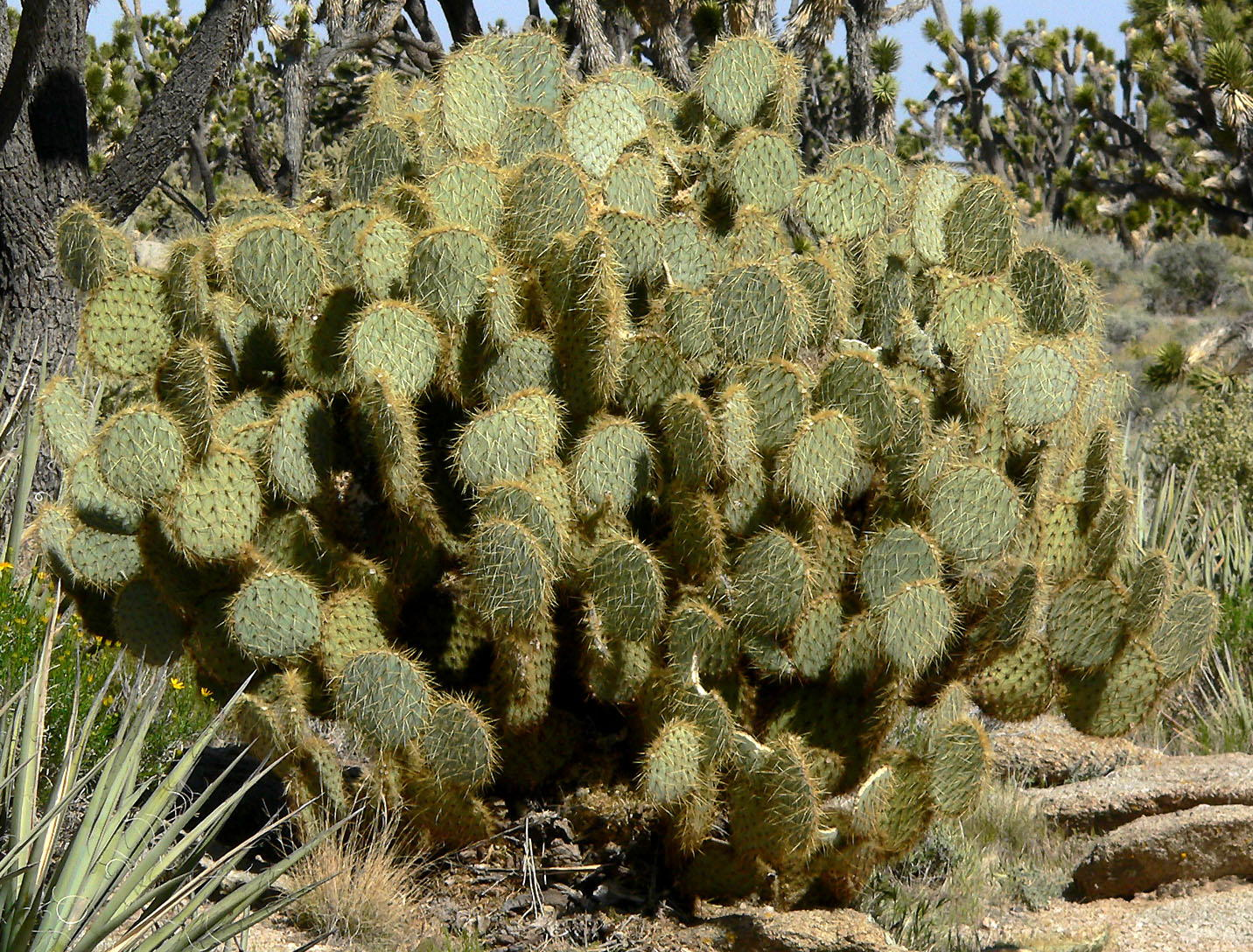
Opuntioideae: Opuntia chlorotica

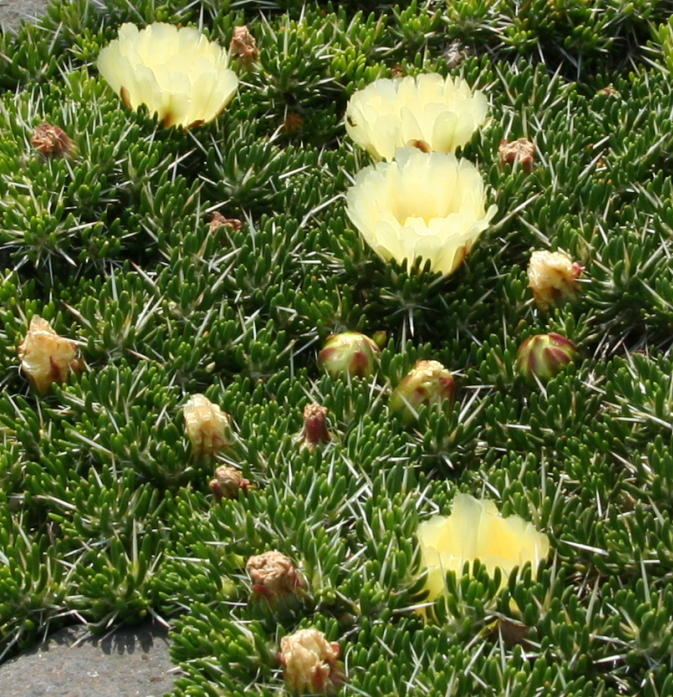
Maihuenioideae: Maihuenia poeppigii

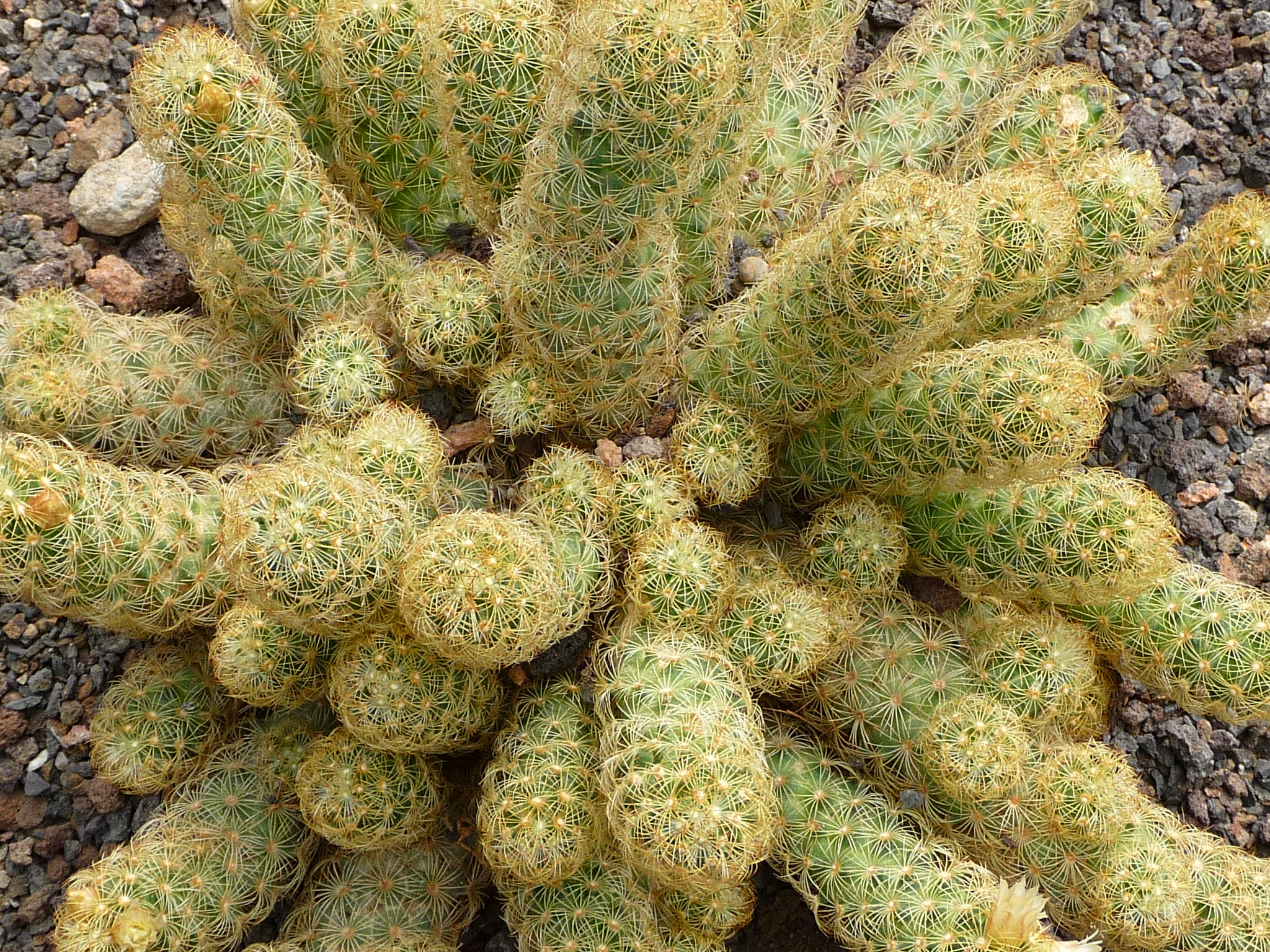
Cactoideae: Mammillaria elongata

- Subfamily Pereskioideae K. Schumann

The only genus in the ICSG classification was Pereskia. It has features considered closest to the ancestors of the Cactaceae. Plants are trees or shrubs with leaves; their stems are smoothly round in cross section, rather than being ribbed or having tubercles. Two systems may be used in photosynthesis, both the "normal" C_{3} mechanism and crassulean acid metabolism (CAM)—an "advanced" feature of cacti and other succulents that conserves water.
Molecular phylogenetic studies showed that when broadly circumscribed, Pereskia was not monophyletic, and it has been split into three genera, Leuenbergeria, Rhodocactus and a narrowly circumscribed Pereskia. Leuenbergeria is then placed on its own in a separate monogeneric subfamily, Leuenbergerioideae.

- Subfamily Opuntioideae K. Schumann

Some 15 genera are included in this subfamily. They may have leaves when they are young, but these are lost later. Their stems are usually divided into distinct "joints" or "pads" (cladodes). Plants vary in size from the small cushions of Maihueniopsis to treelike species of Opuntia, rising to 10 m (33 ft) or more.

- Subfamily Maihuenioideae P. Fearn

The only genus is Maihuenia, with two species, both of which form low-growing mats. It has some features that are primitive within the cacti. Plants have leaves, and crassulean acid metabolism is wholly absent.

- Subfamily Cactoideae

Divided into nine tribes, this is the largest subfamily, including all the "typical" cacti. Members are highly variable in habit, varying from tree-like to epiphytic. Leaves are normally absent, although sometimes very reduced leaves are produced by young plants. Stems are usually not divided into segments, and are ribbed or tuberculate. Two of the tribes, Hylocereeae and Rhipsalideae, contain climbing or epiphytic forms with a rather different appearance; their stems are flattened and may be divided into segments.

Molecular phylogenetic studies have supported the monophyly of three of these subfamilies, but not Pereskioideae; nor have they supported all of the tribes or even genera below this level. A 2011 study found only 39% of the genera in the subfamily Cactoideae sampled in the research were monophyletic. Classification of the cacti currently remains uncertain and is likely to change.

== Phylogeny and evolution ==
=== Phylogeny ===
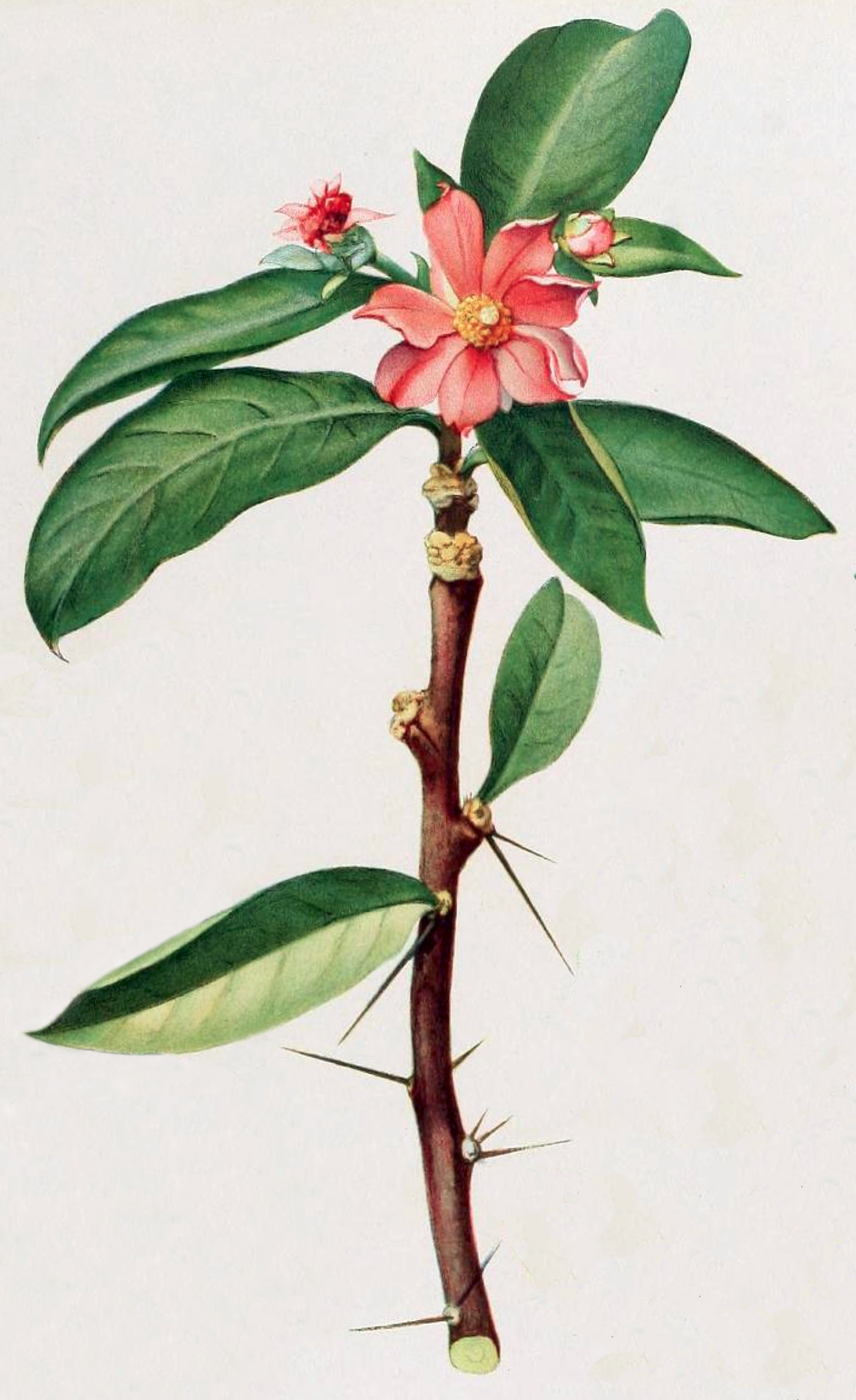
Rhodocactus grandifolius is weakly succulent, possesses leaves, and is thought similar to the ancestor of all cacti.

A 2005 study suggested the genus Pereskia as then circumscribed (Pereskia sensu lato) was basal within the Cactaceae, but confirmed earlier suggestions it was not monophyletic, i.e., did not include all the descendants of a common ancestor. The Bayesian consensus cladogram from this study is shown below with subsequent generic changes added.

- Cactaceae
  - Pereskia s.l. Clade A → Leuenbergeria
  - caulocacti
    - Pereskia s.l. Clade B → Rhodocactus + Pereskia s.s.
    - core cacti
      - Opuntioideae
      - - Maihuenia
        - Cactoideae

A 2011 study using fewer genes but more species also found that Pereskia s.l. was divided into the same clades, but was unable to resolve the members of the "core cacti" clade. It was accepted that the relationships shown above are "the most robust to date."

Leuenbergeria species (Pereskia s.l. Clade A) always lack two key features of the stem present in most of the remaining "caulocacti": like most non-cacti, their stems begin to form bark early in the plants' life and also lack stomata—structures that control admission of air into a plant and hence control photosynthesis. By contrast, caulocacti, including species of Rhodocactus and the remaining species of Pereskia s.s., typically delay forming bark and have stomata on their stems, thus giving the stem the potential to become a major organ for photosynthesis. (The two highly specialized species of Maihuenia are something of an exception.)

The first cacti are thought to have been only slightly succulent shrubs or small trees whose leaves carried out photosynthesis. They lived in tropical areas that experienced periodic drought. If Leuenbergeria is a good model of these early cacti, then, although they would have appeared superficially similar to other trees growing nearby, they had already evolved strategies to conserve water (some of which are present in members of other families in the order Caryophyllales). These strategies included being able to respond rapidly to periods of rain, and keeping transpiration low by using water very efficiently during photosynthesis. The latter was achieved by tightly controlling the opening of stomata. Like Pereskia species today, early ancestors may have been able to switch from the normal C_{3} mechanism, where carbon dioxide is used continuously in photosynthesis, to CAM cycling, in which when the stomata are closed, carbon dioxide produced by respiration is stored for later use in photosynthesis.

The clade containing Rhodocactus and Pereskia s.s. marks the beginnings of an evolutionary switch to using stems as photosynthetic organs. Stems have stomata and the formation of bark takes place later than in normal trees. The "core cacti" show a steady increase in both stem succulence and photosynthesis accompanied by multiple losses of leaves, more-or-less complete in the Cactoideae. One evolutionary question at present unanswered is whether the switch to full CAM photosynthesis in stems occurred only once in the core cacti, in which case it has been lost in Maihuenia, or separately in Opuntioideae and Cactoideae, in which case it never evolved in Maihuenia.

Understanding evolution within the core cacti clade is difficult as of February 2012, since phylogenetic relationships are still uncertain and not well related to current classifications. Thus, a 2011 study found "an extraordinarily high proportion of genera" were not monophyletic, so were not all descendants of a single common ancestor. For example, of the 36 genera in the subfamily Cactoideae sampled in the research, 22 (61%) were found not monophyletic. Nine tribes are recognized within Cactoideae in the International Cactaceae Systematics Group (ICSG) classification; one, Calymmantheae, comprises a single genus, Calymmanthium. Only two of the remaining eight – Cacteae and Rhipsalideae – were shown to be monophyletic in a 2011 study by Hernández-Hernández et al. For a more detailed discussion of the phylogeny of the cacti, see Classification of the Cactaceae.

=== Evolutionary history ===
No known fossils of cacti exist to throw light on their evolutionary history. However, the geographical distribution of cacti offers some evidence. Except for a relatively recent spread of Rhipsalis baccifera to parts of the Old World, cacti are plants of South America and mainly southern regions of North America. This suggests the family must have evolved after the ancient continent of Gondwana split into South America and Africa, which occurred during the Early Cretaceous, around 143 to 101 million years ago. Precisely when after this split cacti evolved is less clear. Older sources suggest an early origin around 90 – 66 million years ago, during the Late Cretaceous. More recent molecular studies suggest a much younger origin, perhaps in very Late Eocene to early Oligocene periods, around 35–30 million years ago. Based on the phylogeny of the cacti, the earliest diverging group (Leuenbergeria) may have originated in Central America and northern South America, whereas the caulocacti, those with more-or-less succulent stems, evolved later in the southern part of South America, and then moved northwards. Core cacti, those with strongly succulent stems, are estimated to have evolved around 25 million years ago. A possible stimulus to their evolution may have been uplifting in the central Andes, some 25–20 million years ago, which was associated with increasing and varying aridity. However, the current species diversity of cacti is thought to have arisen only in the last 10–5 million years (from the late Miocene into the Pliocene). Other succulent plants, such as the Aizoaceae in South Africa, the Didiereaceae in Madagascar and the genus Agave in the Americas, appear to have diversified at the same time, which coincided with a global expansion of arid environments.

== Distribution ==
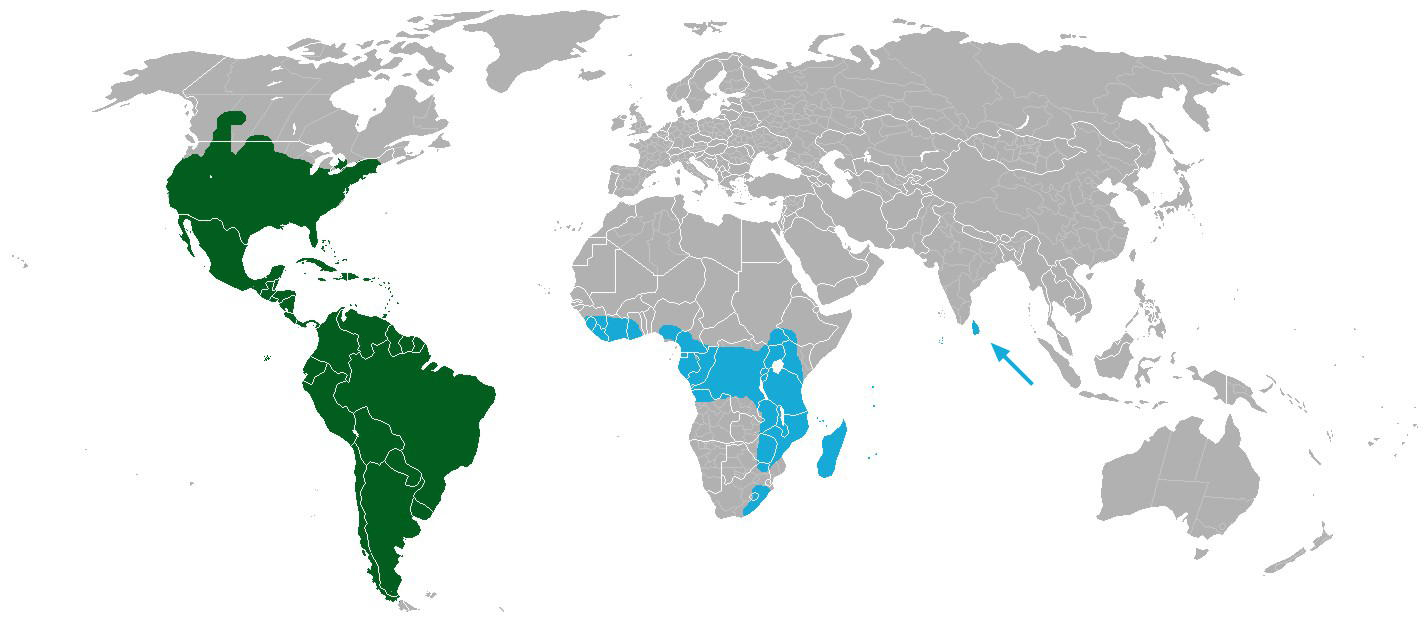
Native distribution of cacti; Rhipsalis baccifera only All other cacti

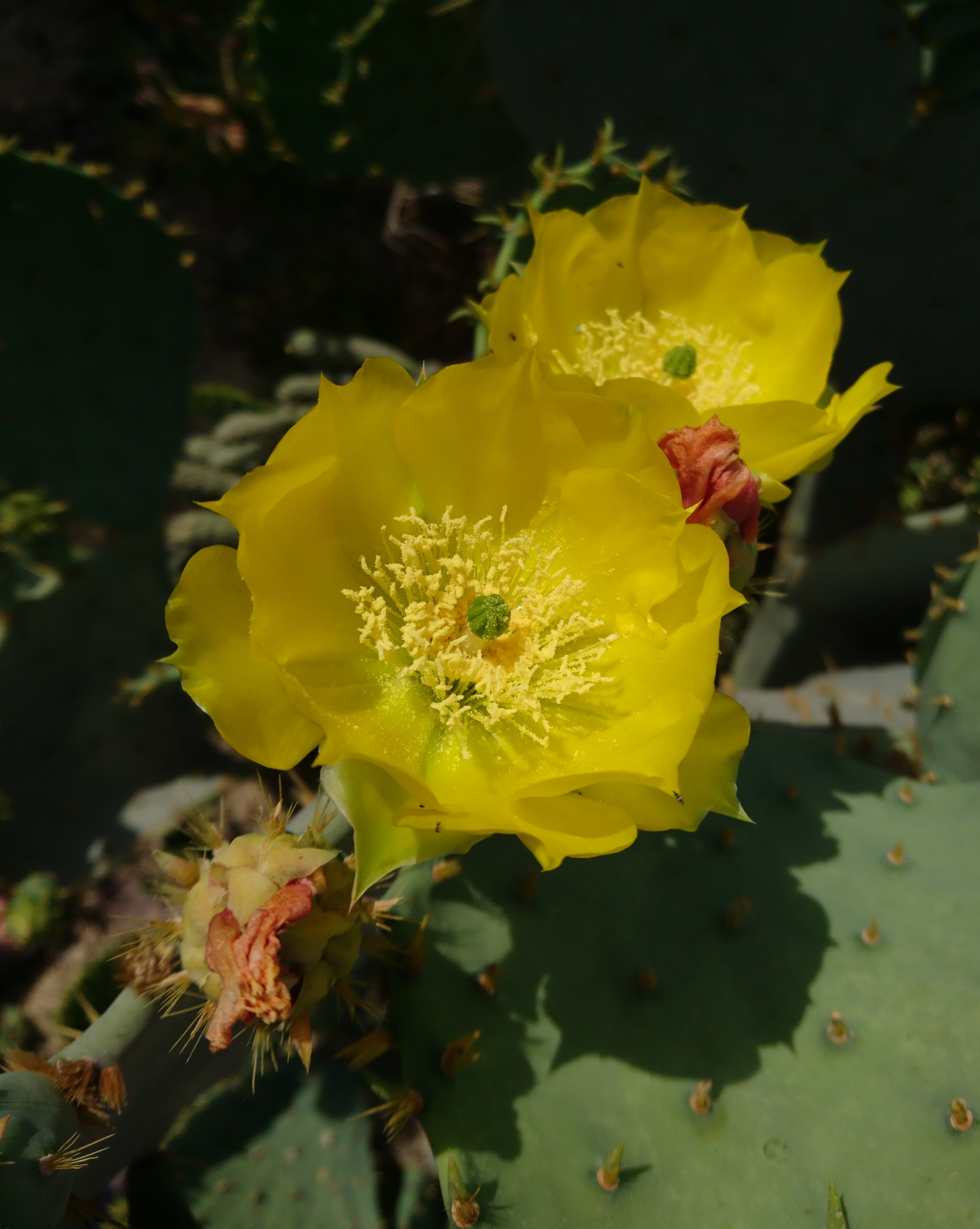
Opuntia ficus-indica in Behbahan, Iran

Cacti inhabit diverse regions, from coastal plains to high mountain areas. With one exception, they are native to the Americas, where their range extends from Patagonia to British Columbia and Alberta in western Canada. A number of centers of diversity exist. For cacti adapted to drought, the three main centers are the deserts of North America; the southwestern Andes, where they are found in Peru, Bolivia, Chile and Argentina; and the Caatinga of eastern Brazil. Tree-living epiphytic and climbing cacti necessarily have different centers of diversity, as they require moister environments. They are mainly found in the coastal mountains and Atlantic forests of southeastern Brazil; in Bolivia, which is the center of diversity for the subfamily Rhipsalideae; and in forested regions of Central America, where the climbing Hylocereeae are most diverse.

Rhipsalis baccifera is the exception; it is native to both the Americas and the Old World, where it is found in tropical Africa, Madagascar, and Sri Lanka. One theory is it was spread by being carried as seeds in the digestive tracts of migratory birds; the seeds of Rhipsalis are adapted for bird distribution. Old World populations are polyploid, and regarded as distinct subspecies, supporting the idea that the spread was not recent. The alternative theory is the species initially crossed the Atlantic on European ships trading between South America and Africa, after which birds may have spread it more widely.

=== Naturalized species ===
Many other species have become naturalized outside the Americas after having been introduced by people, especially in Australia, Hawaii, and the Mediterranean region. In Australia, species of Opuntia, particularly Opuntia stricta, were introduced in the 19th century for use as natural agricultural fences and in an attempt to establish a cochineal industry. They rapidly became a major weed problem, but are now controlled by biological agents, particularly the moth Cactoblastis cactorum. The weed potential of Opuntia species in Australia continues however, leading to all opuntioid cacti except O. ficus-indica being declared Weeds of National Significance by the Australian Weeds Committee in April 2012.

The Arabian Peninsula has a wide variety of ever-increasing, introduced cactus populations. Some of these are cultivated, some are escapes from cultivation, and some are invasives that are presumed to be ornamental escapes.

== Reproductive ecology ==
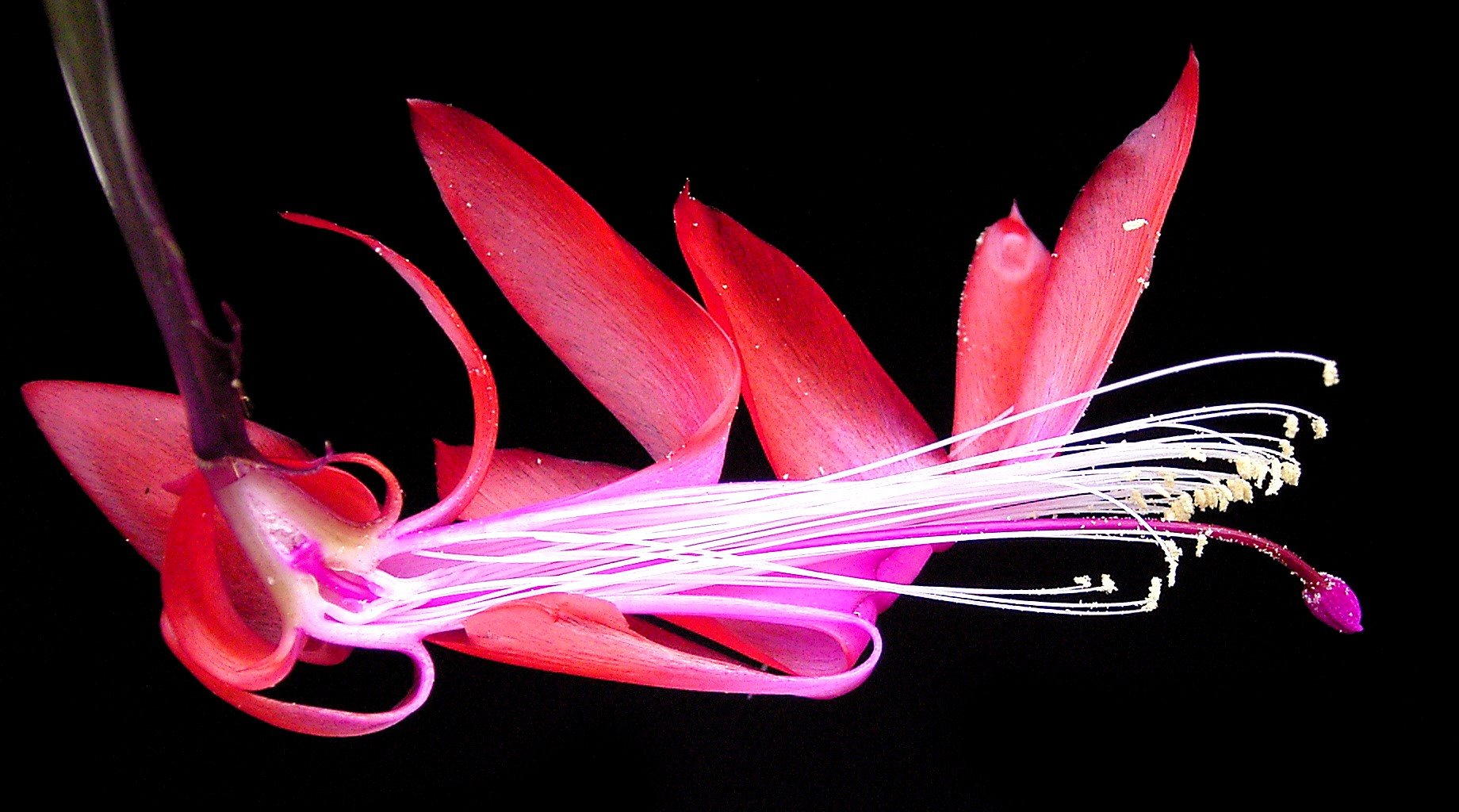
Flower of Schlumbergera cut in half, showing typical adaptations to bird pollination

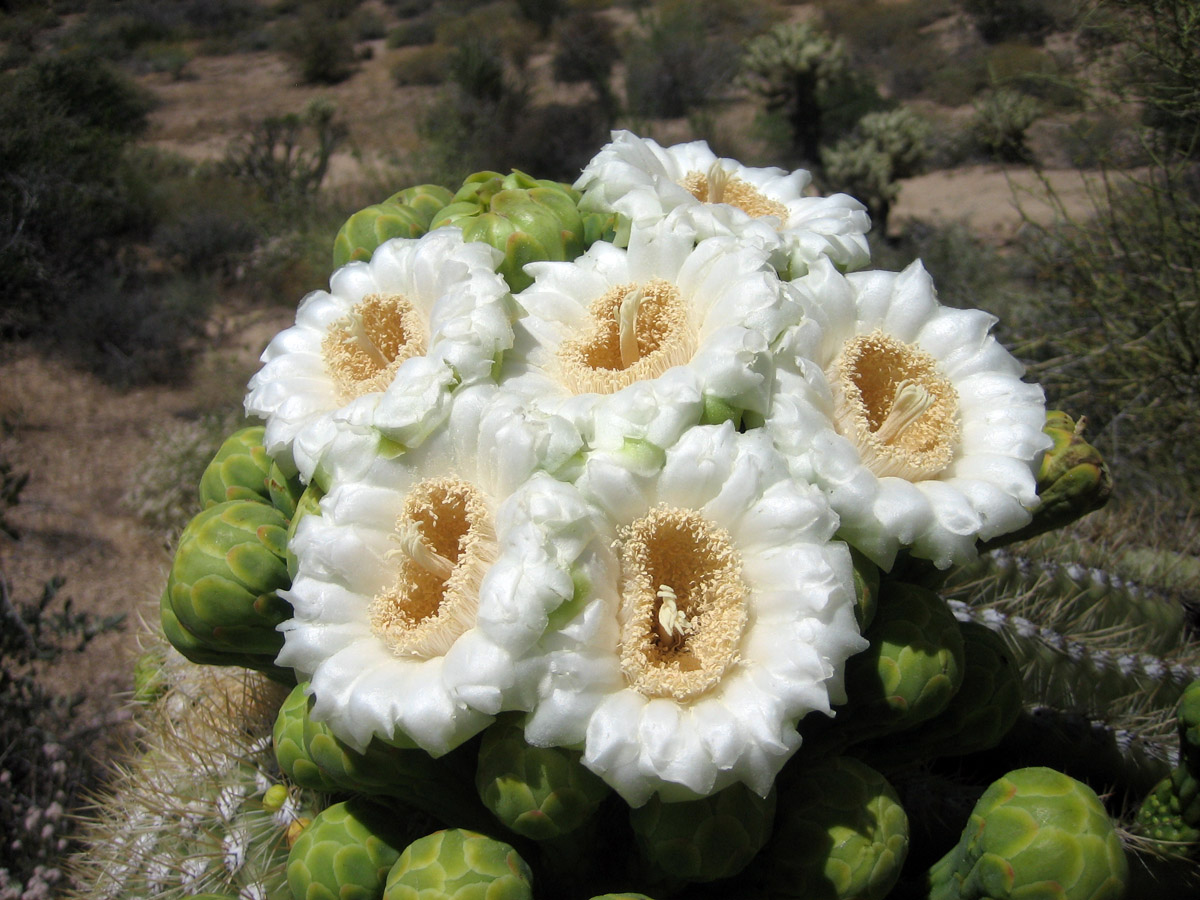
Flowers of saguaro showing flattish white flowers adapted for bat pollination

Cactus flowers are pollinated by insects, birds and bats. None are known to be wind-pollinated and self-pollination occurs in only a very few species; for example the flowers of some species of Frailea do not open (cleistogamy). The need to attract pollinators has led to the evolution of pollination syndromes, which are defined as groups of "floral traits, including rewards, associated with the attraction and utilization of a specific group of animals as pollinators."

Bees are the most common pollinators of cacti; bee-pollination is considered to have been the first to evolve. Day-flying butterflies and nocturnal moths are associated with different pollination syndromes. Butterfly-pollinated flowers are usually brightly colored, opening during the day, whereas moth-pollinated flowers are often white or pale in color, opening only in the evening and at night. As an example, Lophocereus schottii is pollinated by a particular species of moth, Upiga virescens, which also lays its eggs among the developing seeds its caterpillars later consume. The flowers of this cactus are funnel-shaped, white to deep pink, up to 4 cm (1.6 in) long, and open at night.

Hummingbirds are significant pollinators of cacti. Species showing the typical hummingbird-pollination syndrome have flowers with colors towards the red end of the spectrum, anthers and stamens that protrude from the flower, and a shape that is not radially symmetrical, with a lower lip that bends downwards; they produce large amounts of nectar with a relatively low sugar content. Schlumbergera species, such as S. truncata, have flowers that correspond closely to this syndrome. Other hummingbird-pollinated genera include Cleistocactus and Disocactus.

Bat-pollination is relatively uncommon in flowering plants, but about a quarter of the genera of cacti are known to be pollinated by bats—an unusually high proportion, exceeded among eudicots by only two other families, both with very few genera. Columnar cacti growing in semidesert areas are among those most likely to be bat-pollinated; this may be because bats are able to travel considerable distances, so are effective pollinators of plants growing widely separated from one another, and because nighttime pollination may conserve moisture compared to daytime production of nectar in hot desert climates. As such, the pollination syndrome associated with bats includes a tendency for flowers to open in the evening and at night, when bats are active. Other features include a relatively dull color, often white or green, which is more visible in moonlight; a radially symmetrical shape, often tubular; a smell described as "musty", a smell more attractive to bats; and the production of a large amount of sugar-rich nectar. Carnegiea gigantea is an example of a bat-pollinated cactus, as are many species of Pachycereus and Pilosocereus.

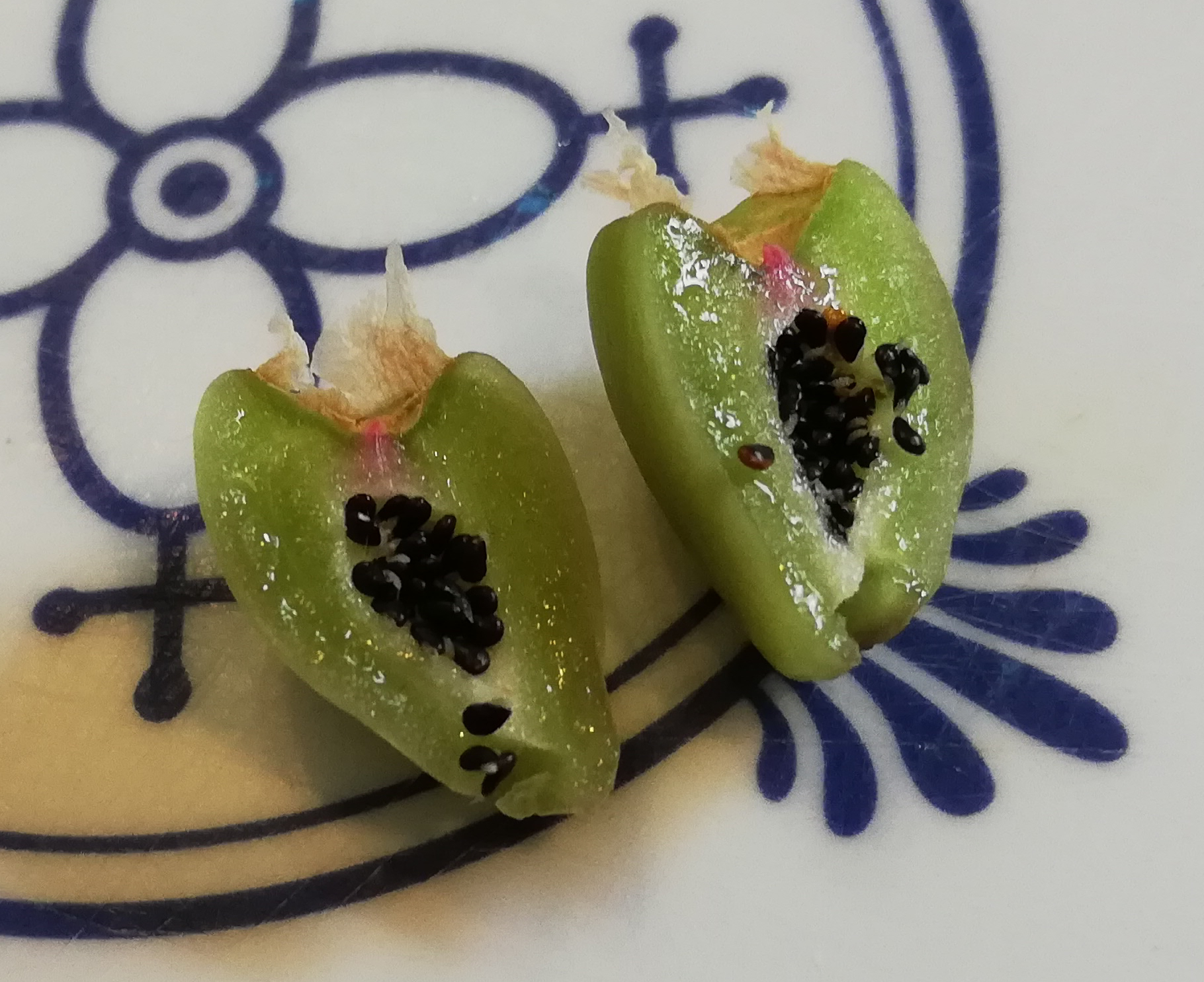
Fruit of Schlumbergera cut in half; the length is 1.0~1.5 cm.

The fruits produced by cacti after the flowers have been fertilized vary considerably; many are fleshy, although some are dry. All contain a large number of seeds. Fleshy, colorful and sweet-tasting fruits are associated with seed dispersal by birds. The seeds pass through their digestive systems and are deposited in their droppings. Fruit that falls to the ground may be eaten by other animals; giant tortoises are reported to distribute Opuntia seeds in the Galápagos Islands. Ants appear to disperse the seeds of a few genera, such as Blossfeldia. Drier spiny fruits may cling to the fur of mammals or be moved around by the wind.

== Uses ==
=== Early history ===
As of March 2012, there is still controversy as to the precise dates when humans first entered those areas of the New World where cacti are commonly found, and hence when they might first have used them. An archaeological site in Chile has been dated to around 15,000 years ago, suggesting cacti would have been encountered before then. Early evidence of the use of cacti includes cave paintings in the Serra da Capivara in Brazil, and seeds found in ancient middens (waste dumps) in Mexico and Peru, with dates estimated at 12,000–9,000 years ago. Hunter-gatherers likely collected cactus fruits in the wild and brought them back to their camps.

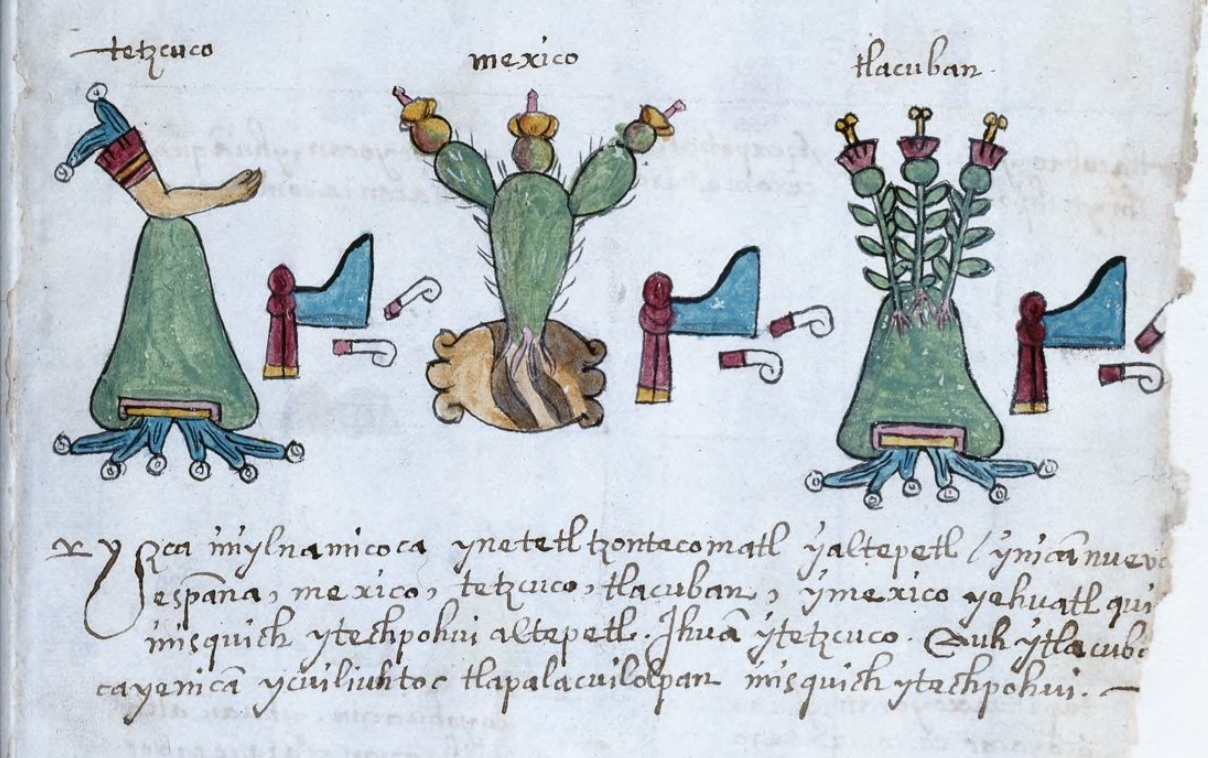
The central image in this extract from the Codex Osuna of 1565 shows an opuntia used as a symbol for Tenochtitlan (now in Mexico City)

The coat of arms of Mexico depicts a Mexican golden eagle perched on an opuntia, devouring a snake.

It is not known when cacti were first cultivated. Opuntias (prickly pears) were used for a variety of purposes by the Aztecs, whose empire, lasting from the 14th to the 16th century, had a complex system of horticulture. Their capital from the 15th century was Tenochtitlan (now Mexico City); one explanation for the origin of the name is that it includes the Nahuatl word nōchtli, referring to the fruit of an opuntia. The coat of arms of Mexico shows an eagle perched on a cactus while holding a snake, an image at the center of the myth of the founding of Tenochtitlan. The Aztecs symbolically linked the ripe red fruits of an opuntia to human hearts; just as the fruit quenches thirst, so offering human hearts to the sun god ensured the sun would keep moving.

Europeans first encountered cacti when they arrived in the New World late in the 15th century. Their first landfalls were in the West Indies, where relatively few cactus genera are found; one of the most common is the genus Melocactus. Thus, melocacti were possibly among the first cacti seen by Europeans. Melocactus species were present in English collections of cacti before the end of the 16th century (by 1570 according to one source,) where they were called Echinomelocactus, later shortened to Melocactus by Joseph Pitton de Tourneville in the early 18th century. Cacti, both purely ornamental species and those with edible fruit, continued to arrive in Europe, so Carl Linnaeus was able to name 22 species by 1753. One of these, his Cactus opuntia (now part of Opuntia ficus-indica), was described as "fructu majore ... nunc in Hispania et Lusitania" (with larger fruit ... now in Spain and Portugal), indicative of its early use in Europe.

=== Food ===
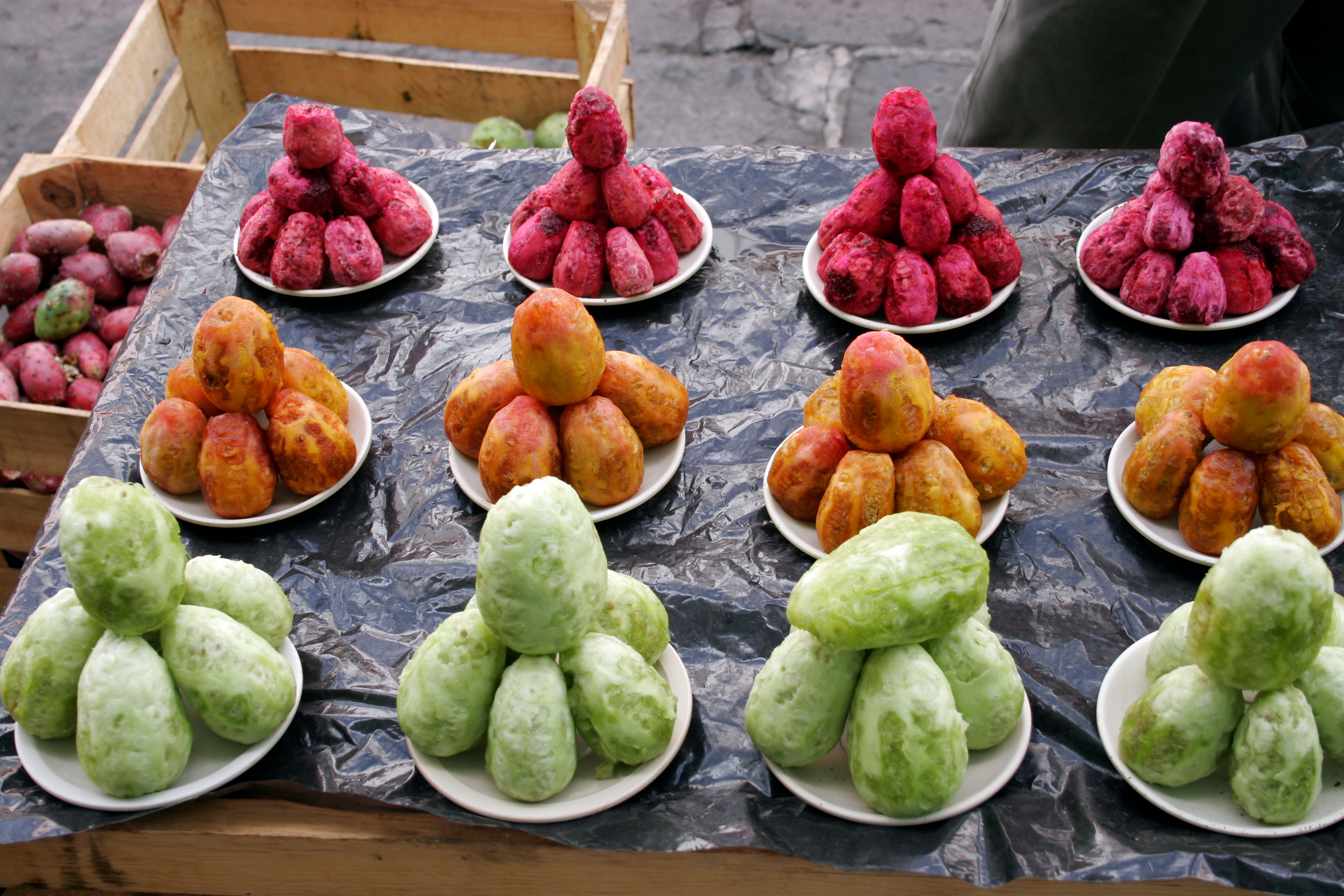
Peeled fruits of the Indian fig cactus of different varieties on sale in Mexico

The plant now known as Opuntia ficus-indica, or the Indian fig cactus, has long been an important source of food. The original species is thought to have come from central Mexico, although this is now obscure because the indigenous people of southern North America developed and distributed a range of horticultural varieties (cultivars), including forms of the species and hybrids with other opuntias. Both the fruit and pads are eaten, the former often under the Spanish name tuna, the latter under the name nopal. Cultivated forms are often significantly less spiny or even spineless. The nopal industry in Mexico was said to be worth US$150 million in 2007. The Indian fig cactus was probably already present in the Caribbean when the Spanish arrived, and was soon after brought to Europe. It spread rapidly in the Mediterranean area, both naturally and by being introduced—so much so, early botanists assumed it was native to the area. Outside the Americas, the Indian fig cactus is an important commercial crop in Sicily, Algeria and other North African countries. Fruits of other opuntias are also eaten, generally under the same name, tuna. Flower buds, particularly of Cylindropuntia species, are also consumed.

Almost any fleshy cactus fruit is edible. The word pitaya or pitahaya (usually considered to have been taken into Spanish from Haitian creole) can be applied to a range of "scaly fruit", particularly those of columnar cacti. The fruit of the saguaro (Carnegiea gigantea) has long been important to the indigenous peoples of northwestern Mexico and the southwestern United States, including the Sonoran Desert. It can be preserved by boiling to produce syrup and by drying. The syrup can also be fermented to produce an alcoholic drink. Fruits of Stenocereus species have also been important food sources in similar parts of North America; Stenocereus queretaroensis is cultivated for its fruit. In more tropical southern areas, the climber Selenicereus undatus provides pitahaya orejona, now widely grown in Asia under the name dragon fruit. Other cacti providing edible fruit include species of Echinocereus, Ferocactus, Mammillaria, Myrtillocactus, Pachycereus, Peniocereus and Selenicereus. The bodies of cacti other than opuntias are less often eaten, although Anderson reported that Neowerdermannia vorwerkii is prepared and eaten like potatoes in upland Bolivia.

Cacti as food

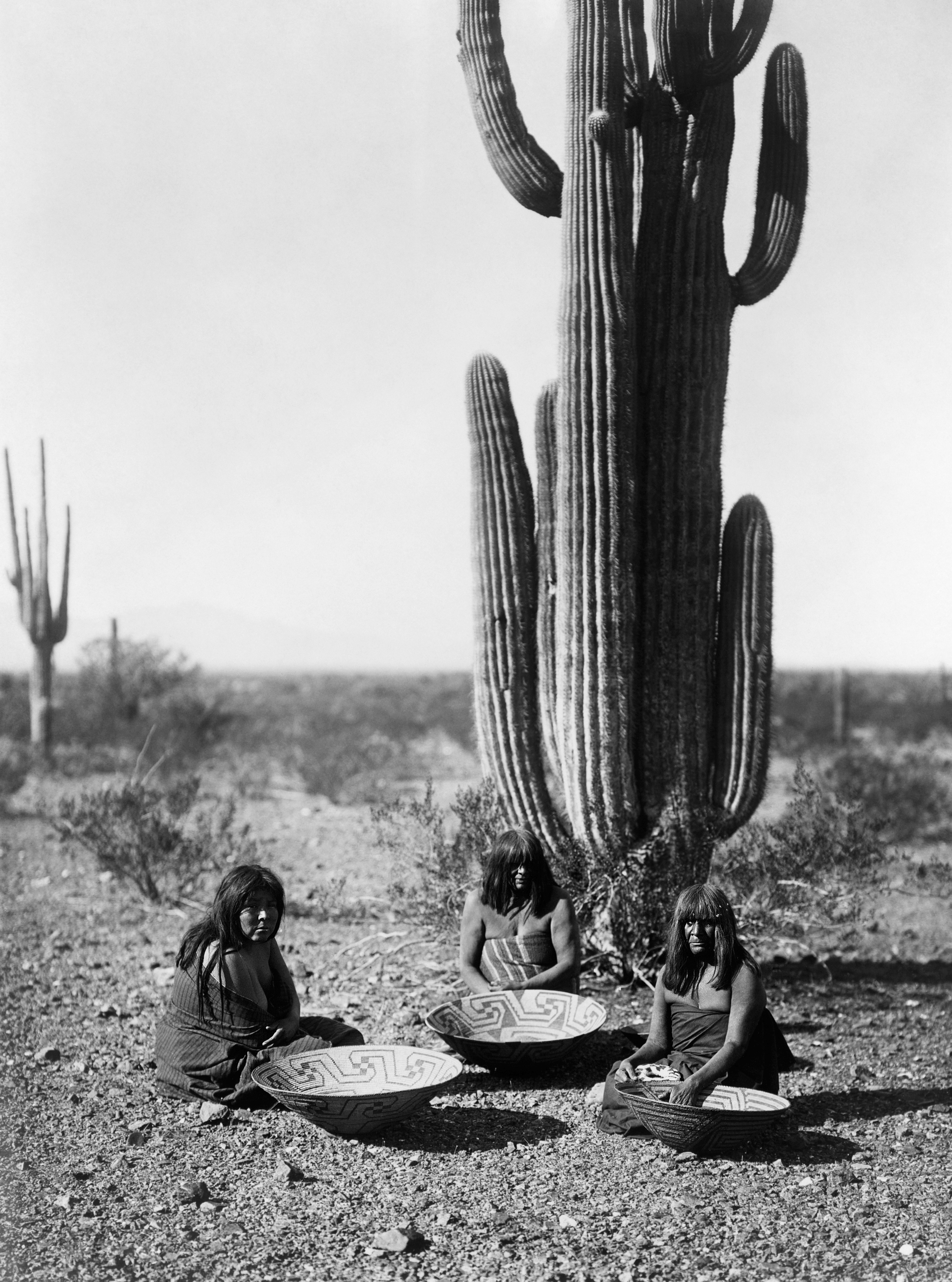
Gathering saguaro fruit in 1907

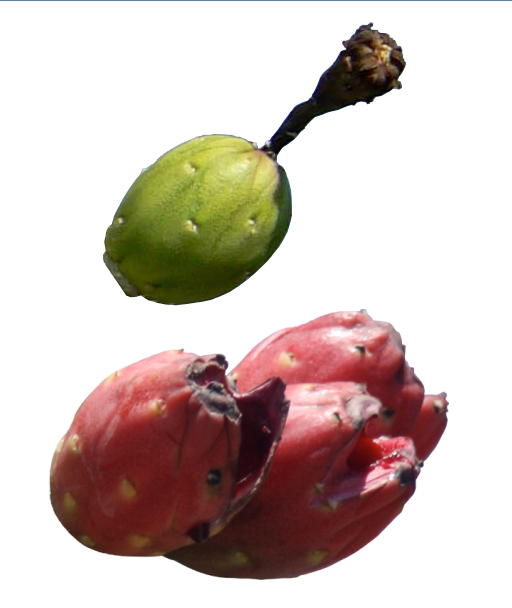
Edible fruit of the saguaro

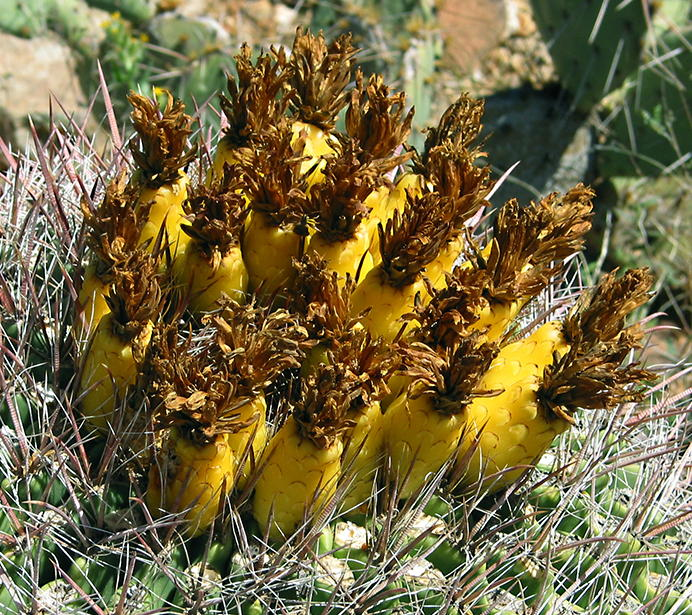
Fruits of some Ferocactus are edible.

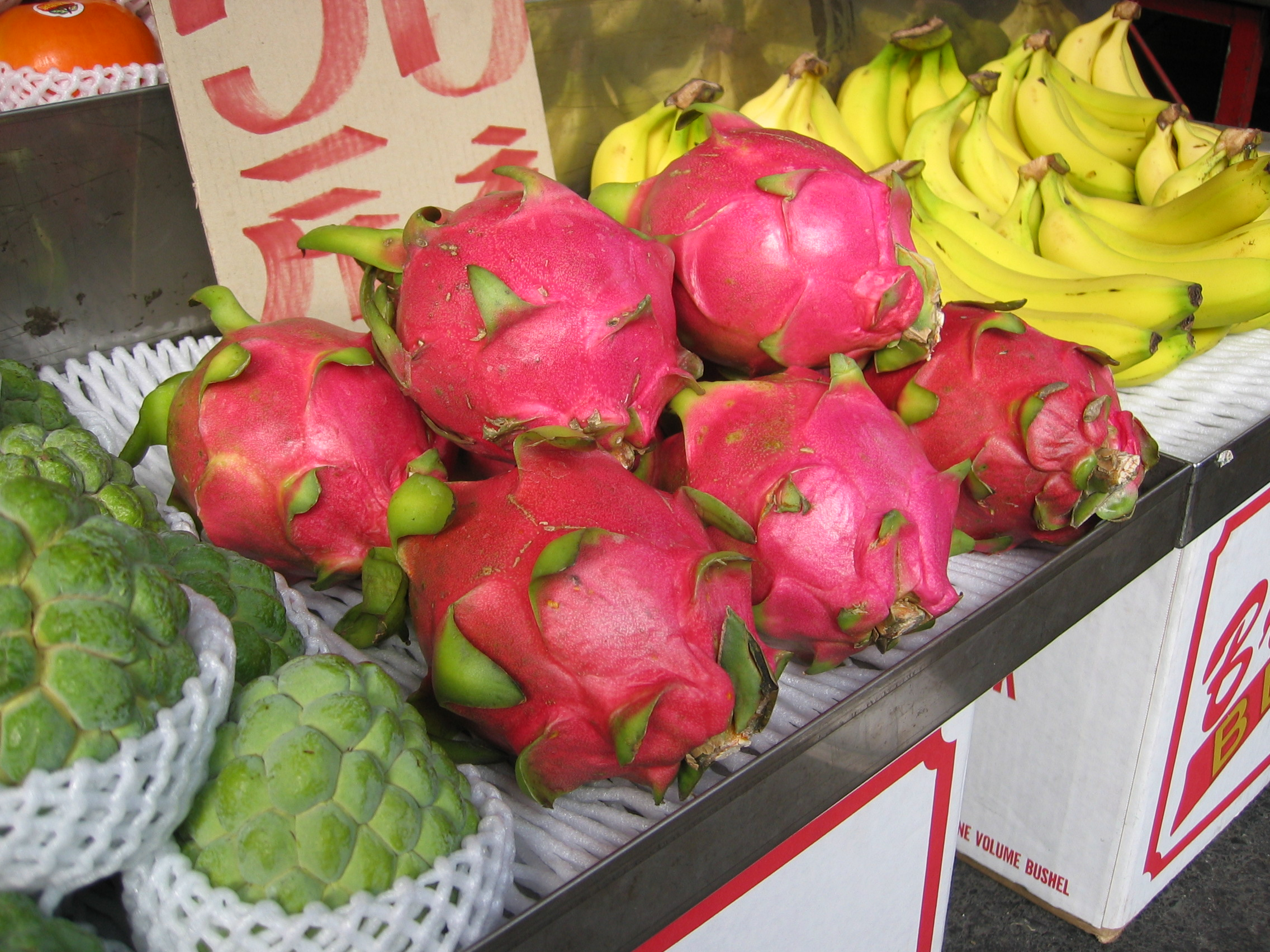
Dragon fruit for sale in Taiwan

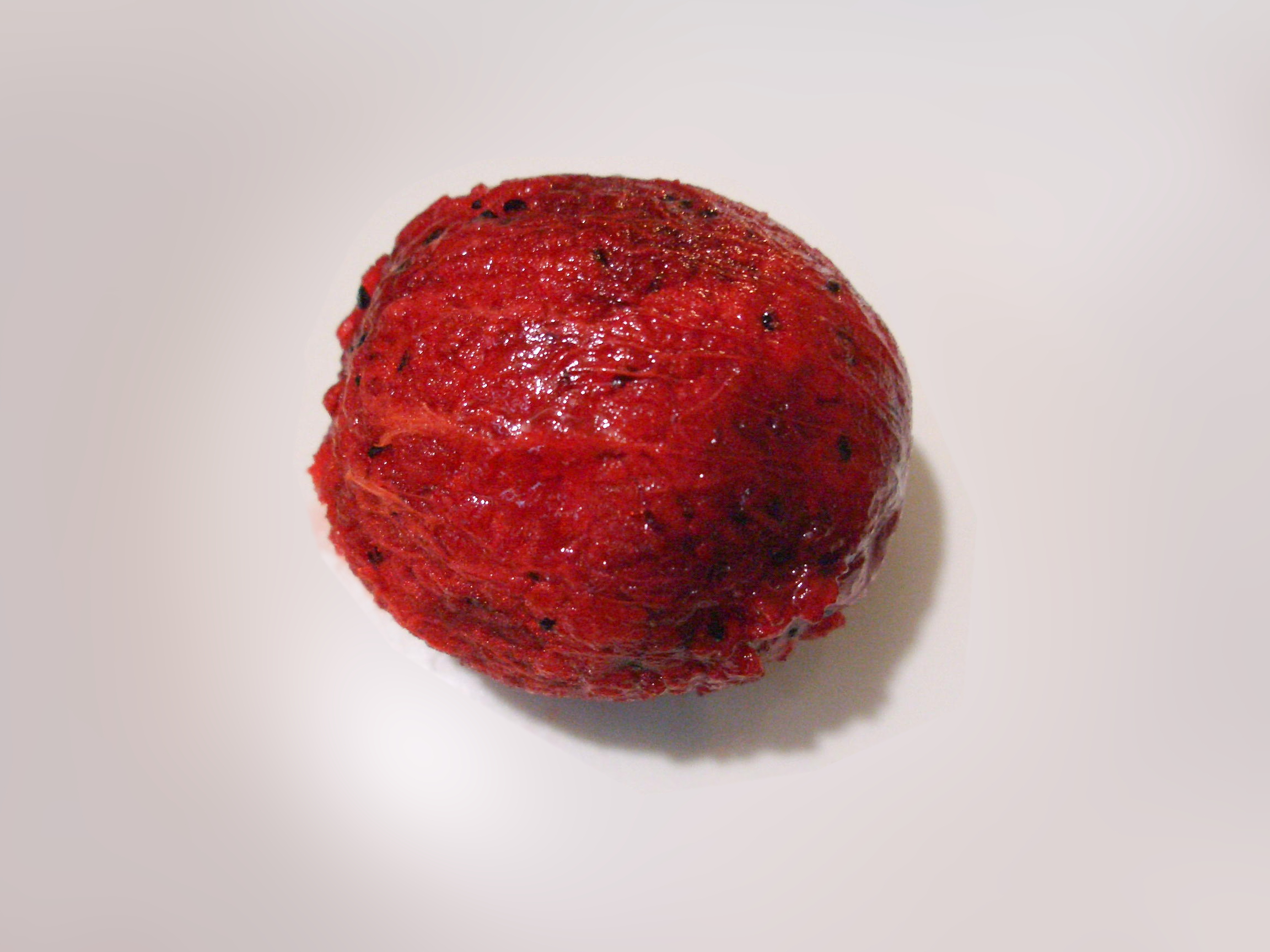
Fruit prepared from Stenocereus queretaroensis

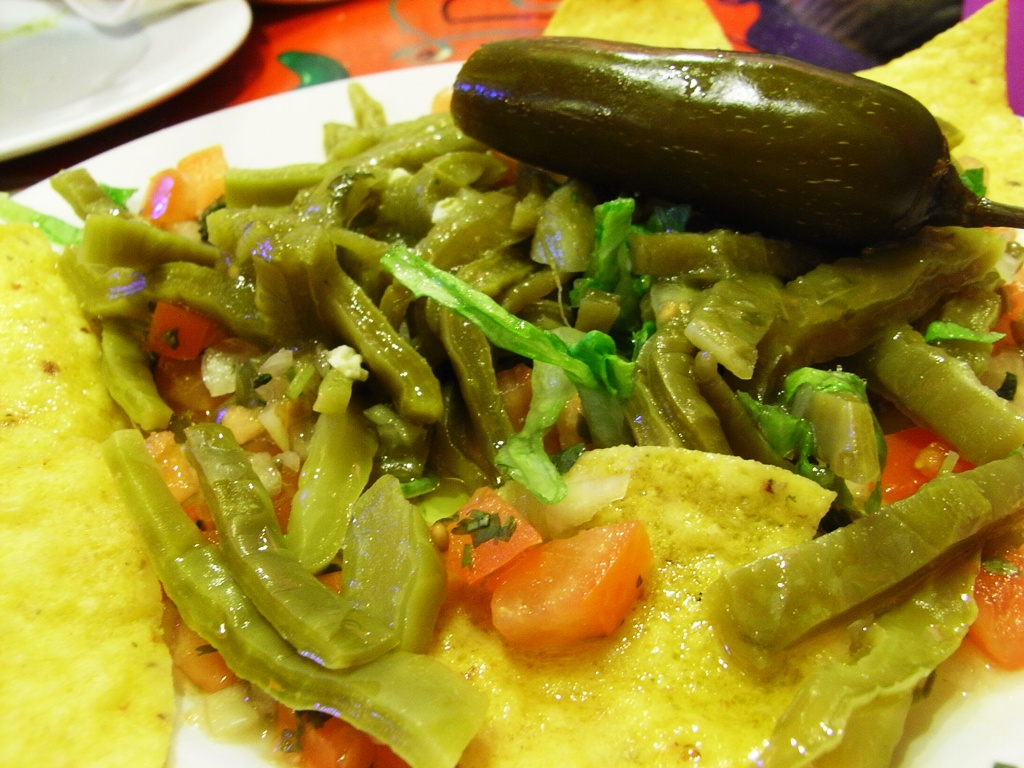
Salad including sliced nopales (opuntia pads)

=== Psychoactive agents ===
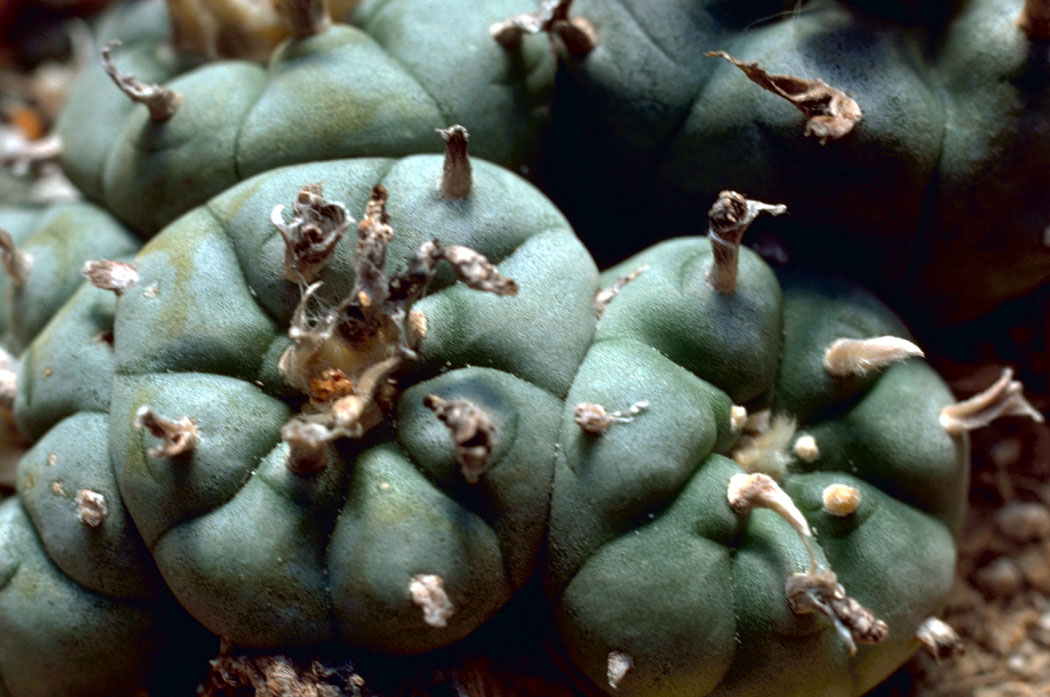
Lophophora williamsii in the wild

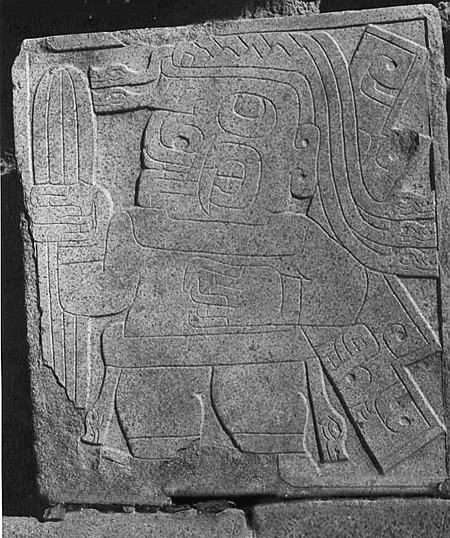
Stone carving from Chavín de Huantar, dated to circa 1000 BC, showing a figure carrying what is thought to be the San Pedro cactus, Echinopsis pachanoi

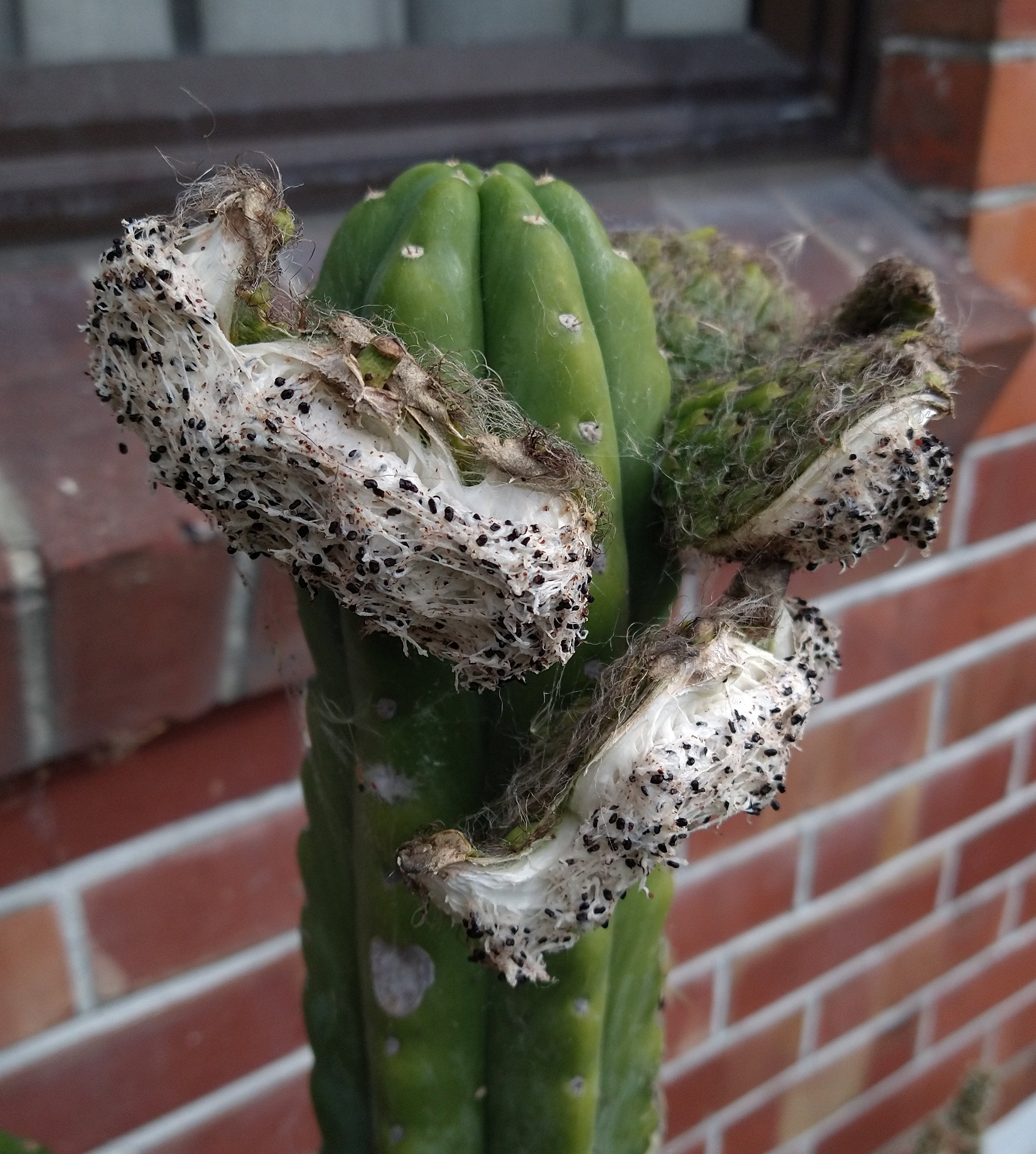
Echinopsis pachanoi

A number of species of cacti have been shown to contain psychoactive agents, chemical compounds that can cause changes in mood, perception and cognition through their effects on the brain. Two species have a long history of use by the indigenous peoples of the Americas: peyote, Lophophora williamsii, in North America, and the San Pedro cactus, Echinopsis pachanoi, in South America. Both contain mescaline.

L. williamsii is native to northern Mexico and southern Texas. Individual stems are about 2–6 cm (0.8–2.4 in) high with a diameter of 4–11 cm (1.6–4.3 in), and may be found in clumps up to 1 m (3 ft) wide. A large part of the stem is usually below ground. Mescaline is concentrated in the photosynthetic portion of the stem above ground. The center of the stem, which contains the growing point (the apical meristem), is sunken. Experienced collectors of peyote remove a thin slice from the top of the plant, leaving the growing point intact, thus allowing the plant to regenerate. Evidence indicates peyote was in use more than 5,500 years ago; dried peyote buttons presumed to be from a site on the Rio Grande, Texas, were radiocarbon dated to around 3780–3660 BC. Peyote is perceived as a means of accessing the spirit world. Attempts by the Roman Catholic church to suppress its use after the Spanish conquest were largely unsuccessful, and by the middle of the 20th century, peyote was more widely used than ever by indigenous peoples as far north as Canada. It is now used formally by the Native American Church.

Echinopsis pachanoi (syn. Trichocereus macrogonus var. pachanoi) is native to Ecuador and Peru. It is very different in appearance from L. williamsii. It has tall stems, up to 6 m (20 ft) high, with a diameter of 6–15 cm (2.4–5.9 in), which branch from the base, giving the whole plant a shrubby or tree-like appearance. Archaeological evidence of the use of this cactus appears to date back to 2,000–2,300 years ago, with carvings and ceramic objects showing columnar cacti. Although church authorities under the Spanish attempted to suppress its use, this failed, as shown by the Christian element in the common name "San Pedro cactus"—Saint Peter cactus. Anderson attributes the name to the belief that just as St Peter holds the keys to heaven, the effects of the cactus allow users "to reach heaven while still on earth." It continues to be used for its psychoactive effects, both for spiritual and for healing purposes, often combined with other psychoactive agents, such as Datura ferox and tobacco. Several other species of Echinopsis, including E. peruviana and E. lageniformis, also contain mescaline.

=== Ornamental plants ===
Cacti were cultivated as ornamental plants from the time they were first brought from the New World. By the early 1800s, enthusiasts in Europe had large collections (often including other succulents alongside cacti). Rare plants were sold for very high prices. Suppliers of cacti and other succulents employed collectors to obtain plants from the wild, in addition to growing their own. In the late 1800s, collectors turned to orchids, and cacti became less popular, although never disappearing from cultivation.

Cacti are often grown in greenhouses, particularly in regions unsuited to the cultivation of cacti outdoors, such the northern parts of Europe and North America. Here, they may be kept in pots or grown in the ground. Cacti are also grown as houseplants, many being tolerant of the often dry atmosphere. Cacti in pots may be placed outside in the summer to ornament gardens or patios, and then kept under cover during the winter. Less drought-resistant epiphytes, such as epiphyllum hybrids, Schlumbergera (the Thanksgiving or Christmas cactus) and Hatiora (the Easter cactus), are widely cultivated as houseplants. Cacti may also be planted outdoors in regions with suitable climates. Concern for water conservation in arid regions has led to the promotion of gardens requiring less watering (xeriscaping). For example, in California, the East Bay Municipal Utility District sponsored the publication of a book on plants and landscapes for summer-dry climates. Cacti are one group of drought-resistant plants recommended for dry landscape gardening.

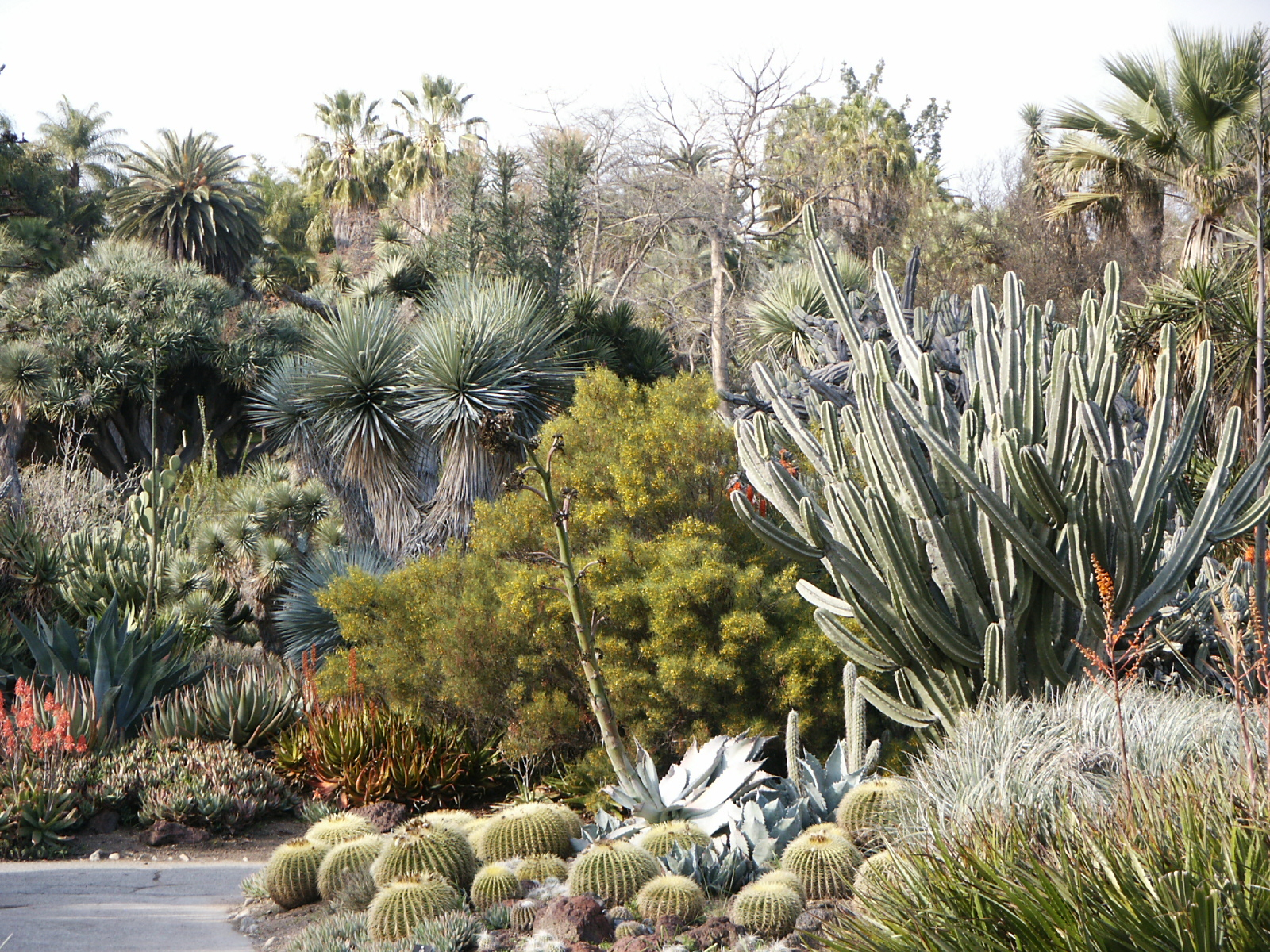
Cacti and other succulents growing in the Huntington Desert Garden

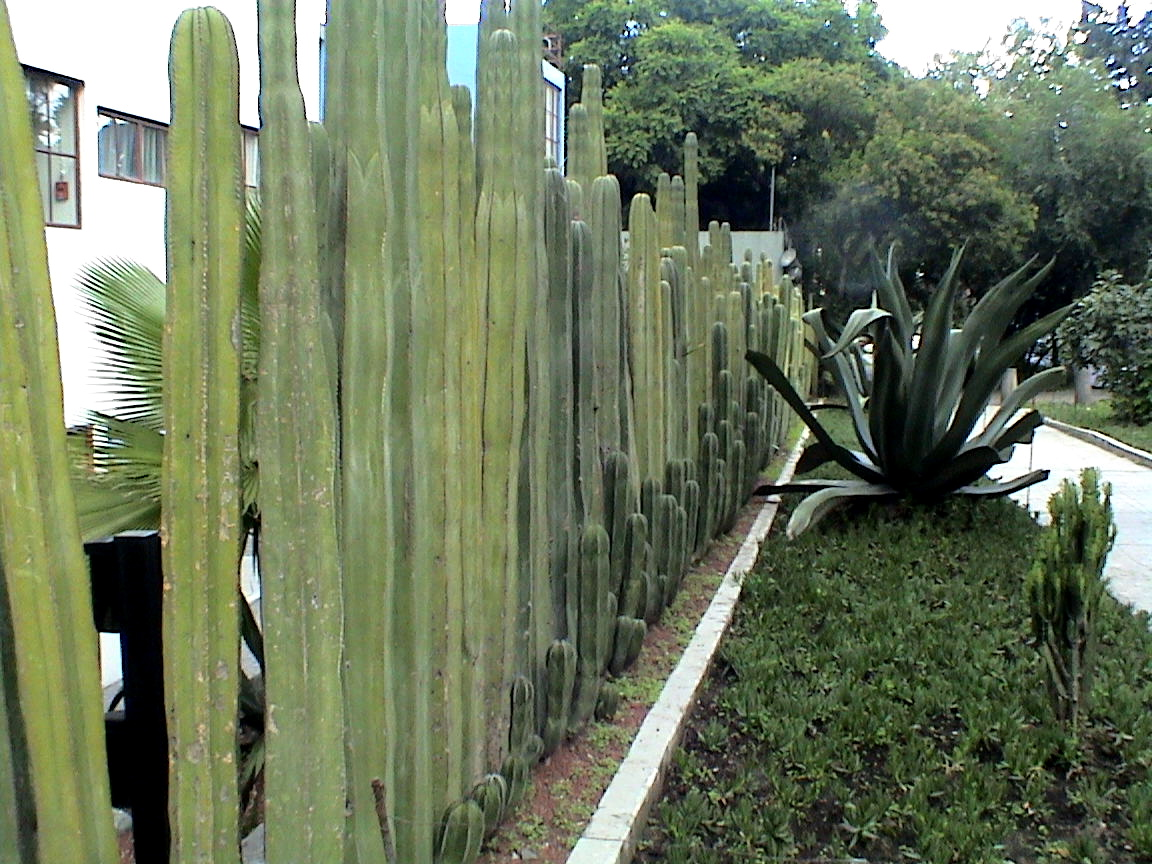
Cactus fence, surrounding house of Frida Kahlo and Diego Rivera in Mexico City

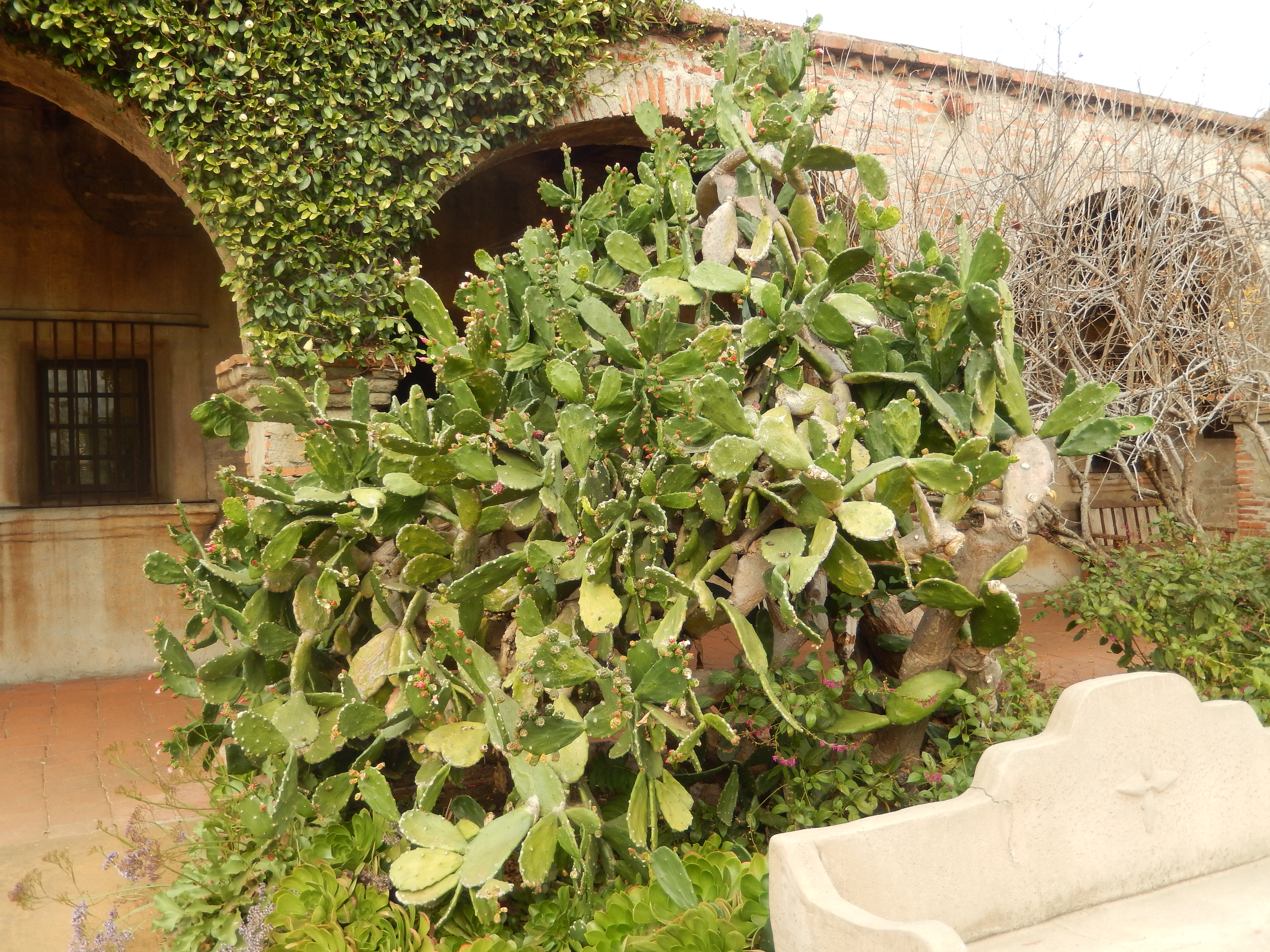
Cacti at the Mission San Juan Capistrano in California

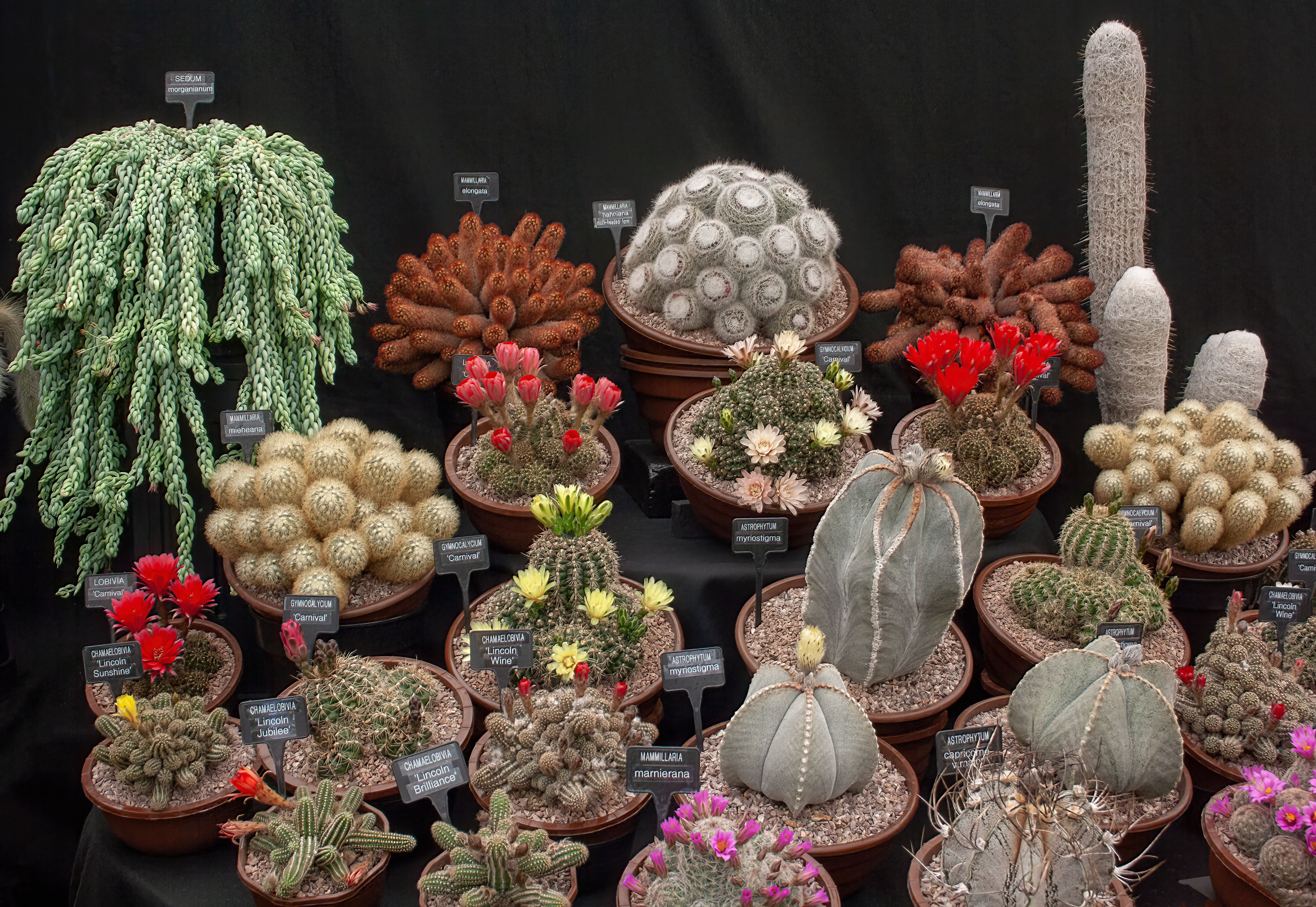
Cacti ornamental at Hampton Court Flower Show

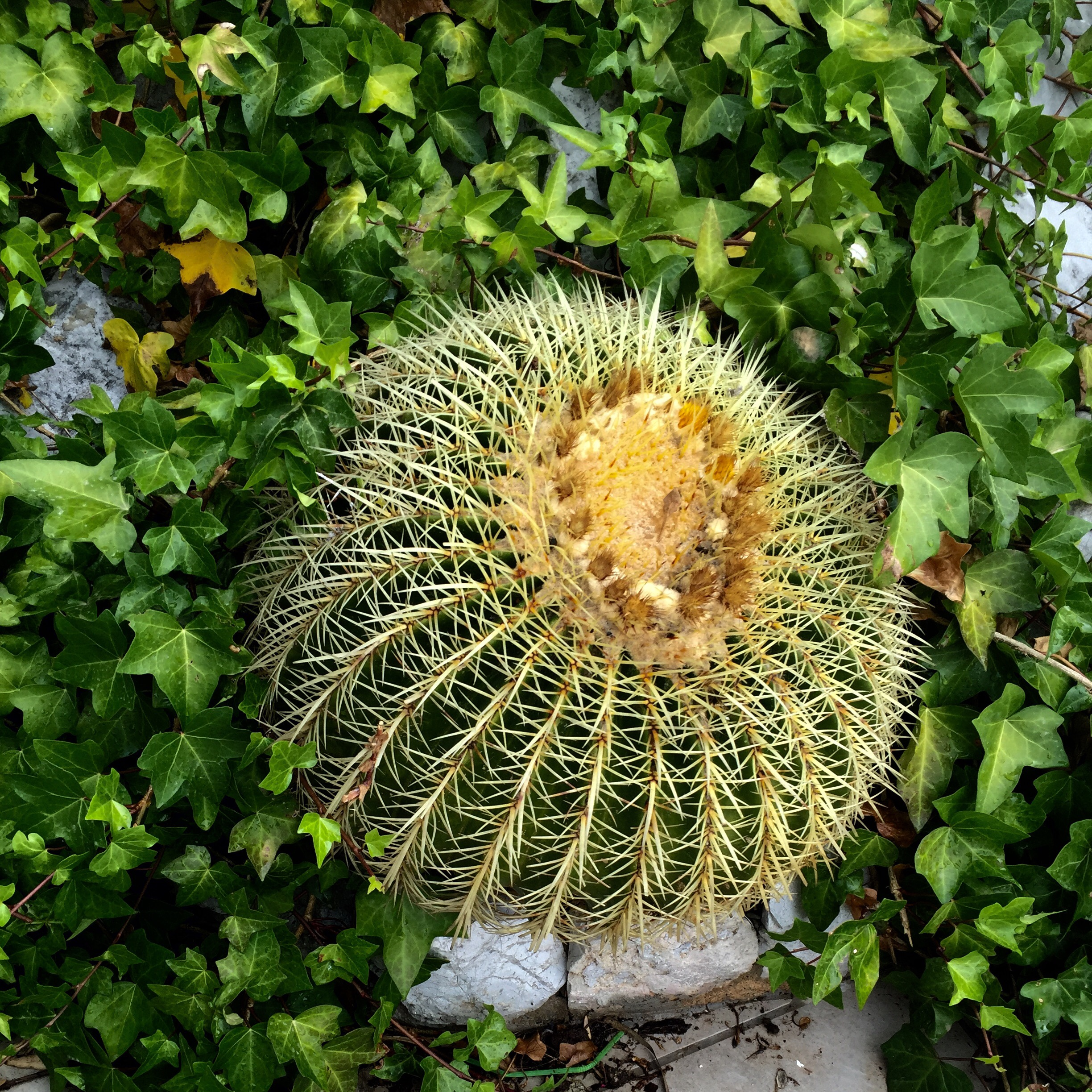
A planted cactus in Gibraltar. The hot and relatively dry climate of the territory allows cacti to thrive.

=== Other uses ===
Cacti have many other uses. They are used for human food and as fodder for animals, usually after burning off their spines. In addition to their use as psychoactive agents, some cacti are employed in herbal medicine. The practice of using various species of Opuntia in this way has spread from the Americas, where they naturally occur, to other regions where they grow, such as India.

Cochineal is a red dye produced by a scale insect that lives on species of Opuntia. Long used by the peoples of Central and North America, demand fell rapidly when European manufacturers began to produce synthetic dyes in the middle of the 19th century. Commercial production has now increased following a rise in demand for natural dyes.

Cacti are used as construction materials. Living cactus fences are employed as barricades around buildings to prevent people breaking in. They also used to corral animals. The woody parts of cacti, such as Cereus repandus and Echinopsis atacamensis, are used in buildings and in furniture. The frames of wattle and daub houses built by the Seri people of Mexico may use parts of the saguaro (Carnegiea gigantea). The very fine spines and hairs (trichomes) of some cacti were used as a source of fiber for filling pillows and in weaving.

== Conservation ==
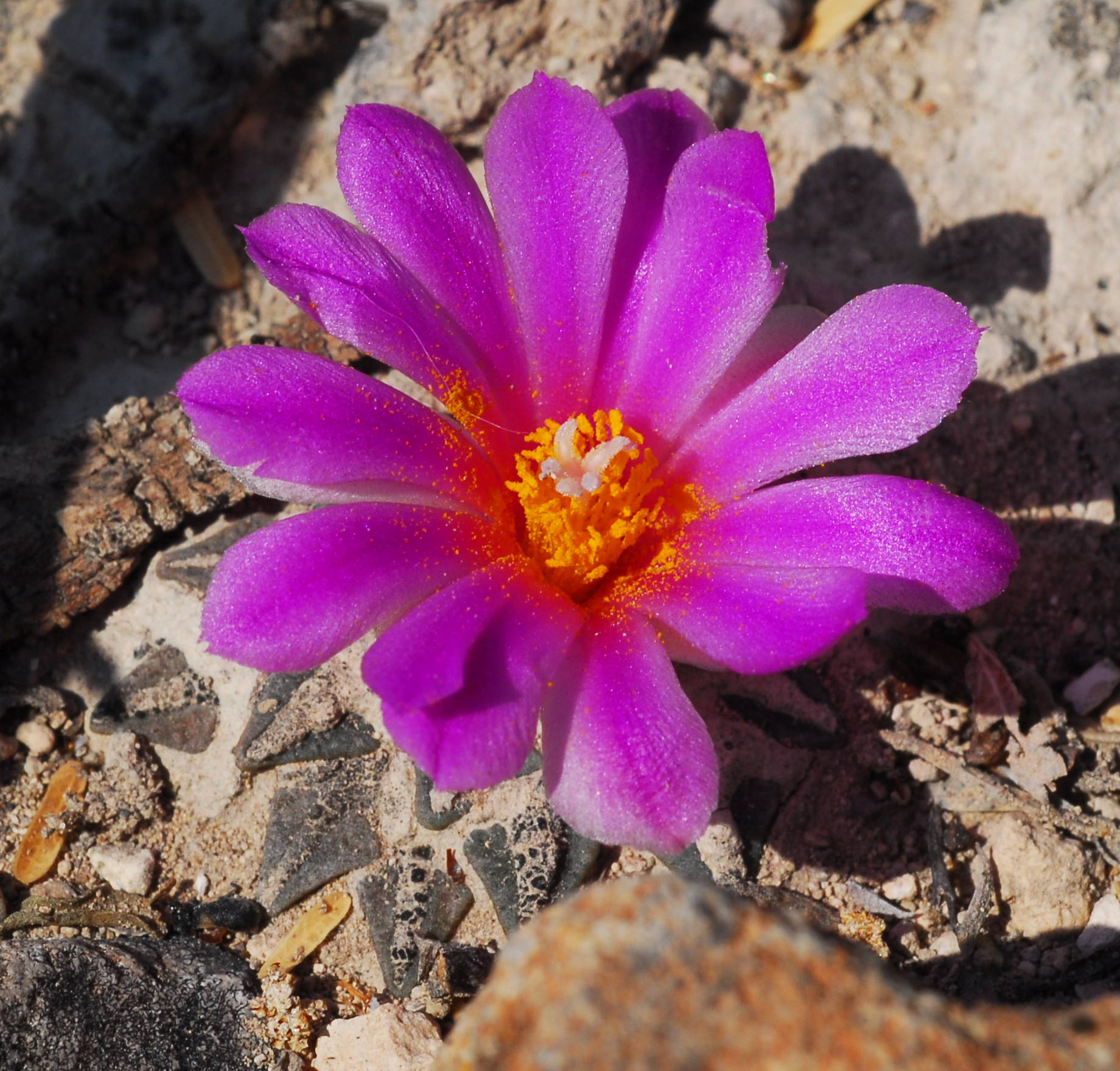
Ariocarpus kotschoubeyanus, an endangered species protected under Appendix I of CITES

All cacti are included in Appendix II of the Convention on International Trade in Endangered Species of Wild Fauna and Flora (CITES), which "lists species that are not necessarily now threatened with extinction but that may become so unless trade is closely controlled." Control is exercised by making international trade in most specimens of cacti illegal unless permits have been issued, at least for exports. Some exceptions are allowed, e.g., for "naturalized or artificially propagated plants". Some cacti, such as all Ariocarpus and Discocactus species, are included in the more restrictive Appendix I, used for the "most endangered" species. These may only be moved between countries for non-commercial purposes, and only then when accompanied by both export and import permits.

The three main threats to cacti in the wild are development, grazing and over-collection. Development takes many forms. The construction of a dam near Zimapan, Mexico, caused the destruction of a large part of the natural habitat of Echinocactus grusonii. Urban development and highways have destroyed cactus habitats in parts of Mexico, New Mexico and Arizona, including the Sonoran Desert. The conversion of land to agriculture has affected populations of Ariocarpus kotschoubeyanus in Mexico, where dry plains were plowed for maize cultivation, and of Copiapoa and Eulychnia in Chile, where valley slopes were planted with vines. Grazing, in many areas by introduced animals, such as goats, has caused serious damage to populations of cacti (as well as other plants); two examples cited by Anderson are the Galápagos Islands generally and the effect on Browningia candelaris in Peru. Over-collection of cacti for sale has greatly affected some species. For example, the type locality of Pelecyphora strobiliformis near Miquihuana, Mexico, was virtually denuded of plants, which were dug up for sale in Europe. Illegal collecting of cacti from the wild continues to pose a threat.

Conservation of cacti can be in situ or ex situ. In situ conservation involves preserving habits through enforcement of legal protection and the creation of specially protected areas such as national parks and reserves. Examples of such protected areas in the United States include Big Bend National Park, Texas; Joshua Tree National Park, California; and Saguaro National Park, Arizona. Latin American examples include Parque Nacional del Pinacate, Sonora, Mexico and Pan de Azúcar National Park, Chile. Ex situ conservation aims to preserve plants and seeds outside their natural habitats, often with the intention of later reintroduction. Botanical gardens play an important role in ex situ conservation; for example, seeds of cacti and other succulents are kept in long-term storage at the Desert Botanical Garden, Arizona.

== Cultivation ==
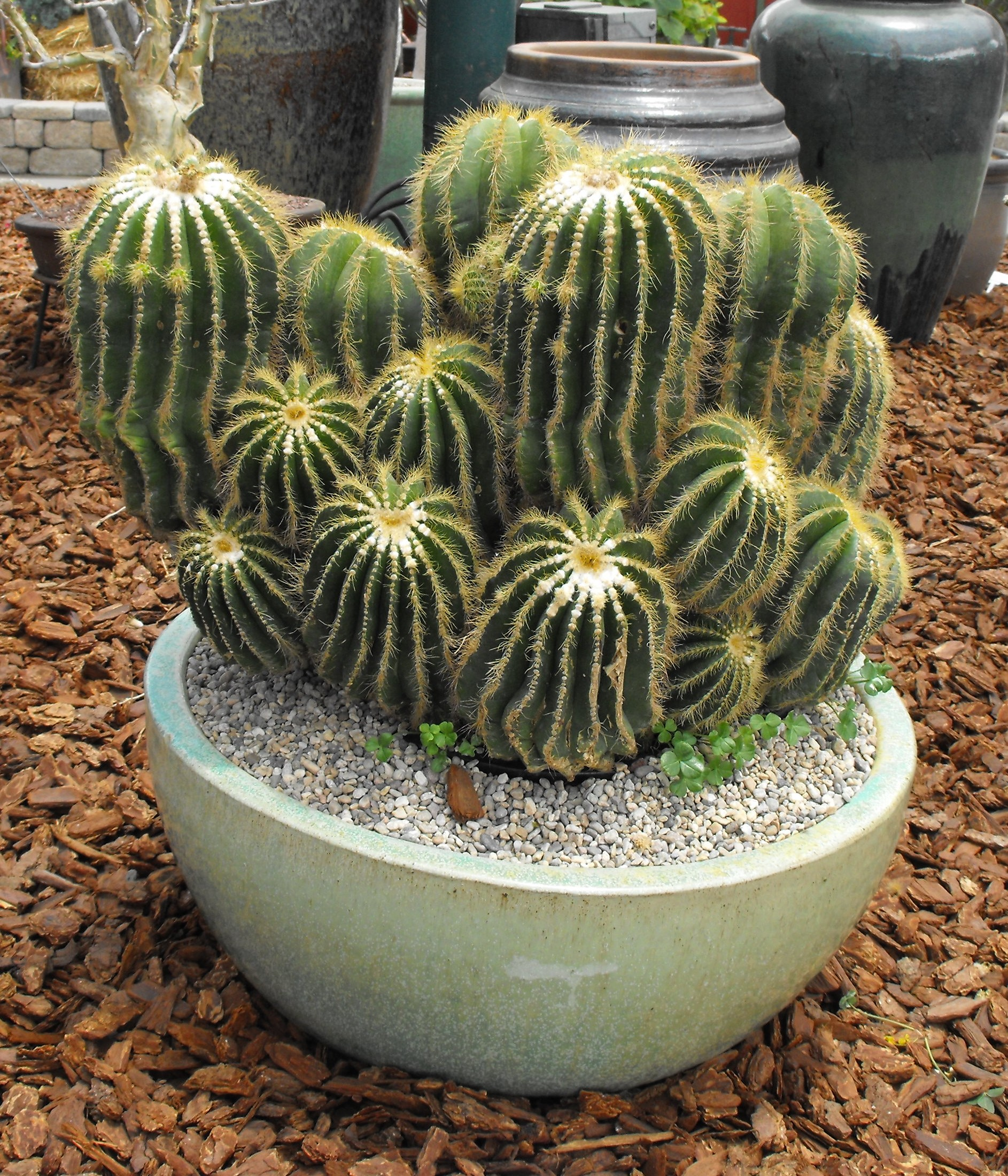
Cultivated Parodia warasii at the San Diego County Fair, California

The popularity of cacti means many books are devoted to their cultivation. Cacti naturally occur in a wide range of habitats and are then grown in many countries with different climates, so precisely replicating the conditions in which a species normally grows is usually not practical. A broad distinction can be made between semidesert cacti and epiphytic cacti, which need different conditions and are best grown separately. This section is primarily concerned with the cultivation of semidesert cacti in containers and under protection, such as in a greenhouse or in the home, rather than cultivation outside in the ground in those climates that permit it. For the cultivation of epiphytic cacti, see Cultivation of Schlumbergera (Christmas or Thanksgiving cacti), and Cultivation of epiphyllum hybrids.

=== Growing medium ===
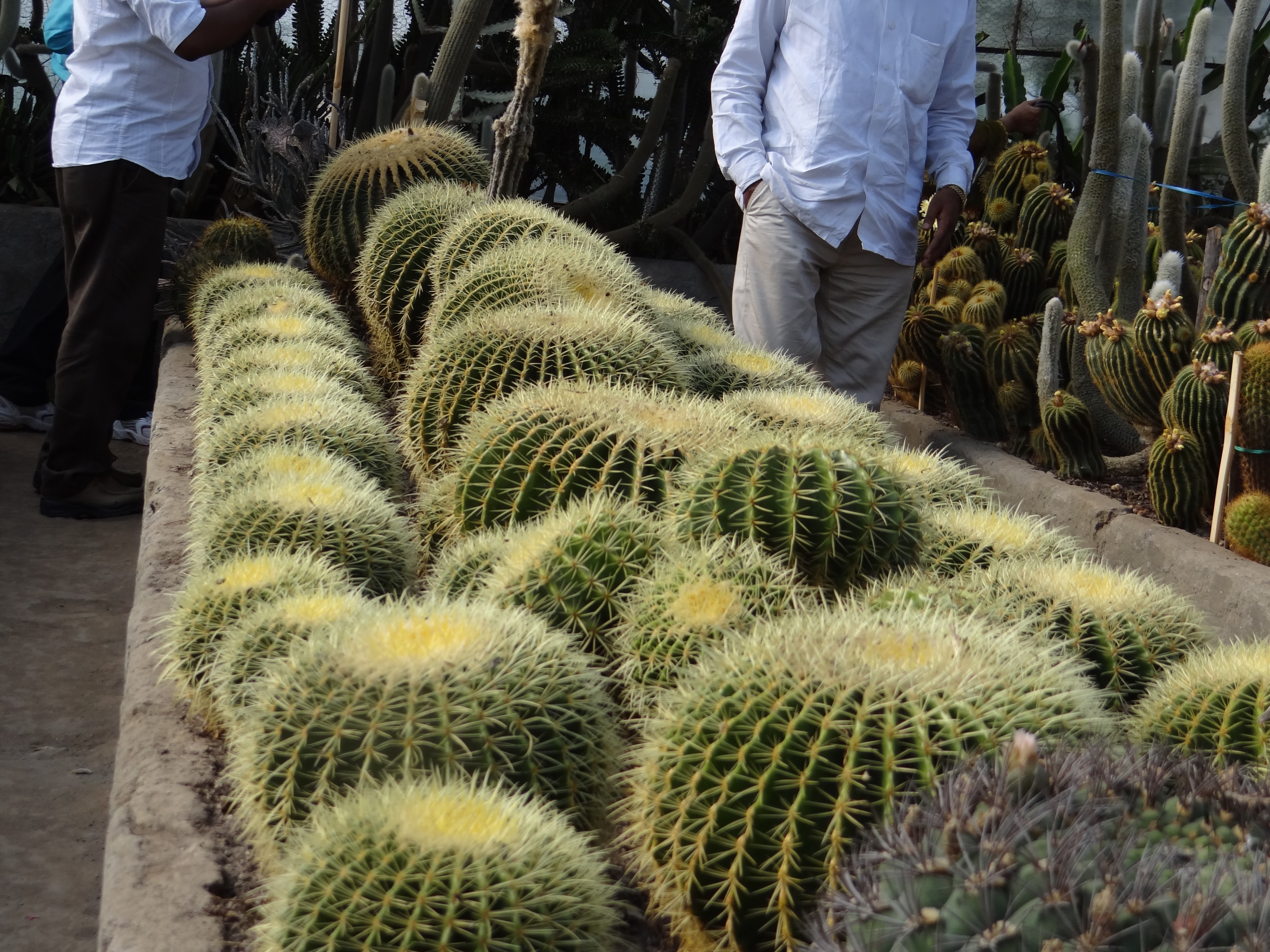
Cacti in a greenhouse in Darjeeling, India

The purpose of the growing medium is to provide support and to store water, oxygen and dissolved minerals to feed the plant. In the case of cacti, there is general agreement that an open medium with a high air content is important. When cacti are grown in containers, recommendations as to how this should be achieved vary greatly; Miles Anderson says that if asked to describe a perfect growing medium, "ten growers would give 20 different answers". Roger Brown suggests a mixture of two parts commercial soilless growing medium, one part hydroponic clay and one part coarse pumice or perlite, with the addition of soil from earthworm castings. The general recommendation of 25–75% organic-based material, the rest being inorganic such as pumice, perlite or grit, is supported by other sources. However, the use of organic material is rejected altogether by others; Hecht says that cacti (other than epiphytes) "want soil that is low in or free of humus", and recommends coarse sand as the basis of a growing medium.

=== Watering ===
Semi-desert cacti need careful watering. General advice is hard to give, since the frequency of watering required depends on where the cacti are being grown, the nature of the growing medium, and the original habitat of the cacti. Brown says that more cacti are lost through the "untimely application of water than for any other reason" and that even during the dormant winter season, cacti need some water. Other sources say that water can be withheld during winter (November to March in the Northern Hemisphere). Another issue is the hardness of the water; where it is necessary to use hard water, regular re-potting is recommended to avoid the build up of salts. The general advice given is that during the growing season, cacti should be allowed to dry out between thorough waterings. A water meter can help in determining when the soil is dry.

=== Light and temperature ===
Although semi-desert cacti may be exposed to high light levels in the wild, they may still need some shading when subjected to the higher light levels and temperatures of a greenhouse in summer. Allowing the temperature to rise above 32 °C (90 °F) is not recommended. The minimum winter temperature required depends very much on the species of cactus involved. For a mixed collection, a minimum temperature of between 5 °C (41 °F) and 10 °C (50 °F) is often suggested, except for cold-sensitive genera such as Melocactus and Discocactus. Some cacti, particularly those from the high Andes, are fully frost-hardy when kept dry (e.g. Rebutia minuscula survives temperatures down to −9 °C (16 °F) in cultivation) and may flower better when exposed to a period of cold.

=== Propagation ===
Cacti can be propagated by seed, cuttings or grafting. Seed sown early in the year produces seedlings that benefit from a longer growing period. Seed is sown in a moist growing medium and then kept in a covered environment, until 7–10 days after germination, to avoid drying out. A very wet growing medium can cause both seeds and seedlings to rot. A temperature range of 18–30 °C (64–86 °F) is suggested for germination; soil temperatures of around 22 °C (72 °F) promote the best root growth. Low light levels are sufficient during germination, but afterwards semi-desert cacti need higher light levels to produce strong growth, although acclimatization is needed to conditions in a greenhouse, such as higher temperatures and strong sunlight.

Reproduction by cuttings makes use of parts of a plant that can grow roots. Some cacti produce "pads" or "joints" that can be detached or cleanly cut off. Other cacti produce offsets that can be removed. Otherwise, stem cuttings can be made, ideally from relatively new growth. It is recommended that any cut surfaces be allowed to dry for a period of several days to several weeks until a callus forms over the cut surface. Rooting can then take place in an appropriate growing medium at a temperature of around 22 °C (72 °F).

Grafting is used for species difficult to grow well in cultivation or that cannot grow independently, such as some chlorophyll-free forms with white, yellow or red bodies, or some forms that show abnormal growth (e.g., cristate or monstrose forms). For the host plant (the rootstock), growers choose one that grows strongly in cultivation and is compatible with the plant to be propagated: the scion. The grower makes cuts on both rootstock and scion and joins the two, binding them together while they unite. Various kinds of graft are used—flat grafts, where both scion and stock are of similar diameters, and cleft grafts, where a smaller scion is inserted into a cleft made in the stock.

Commercially, huge numbers of cacti are produced annually. For example, in 2002 in Korea alone, 49 million plants were propagated, with a value of almost US$9 million. Most of them (31 million plants) were propagated by grafting.

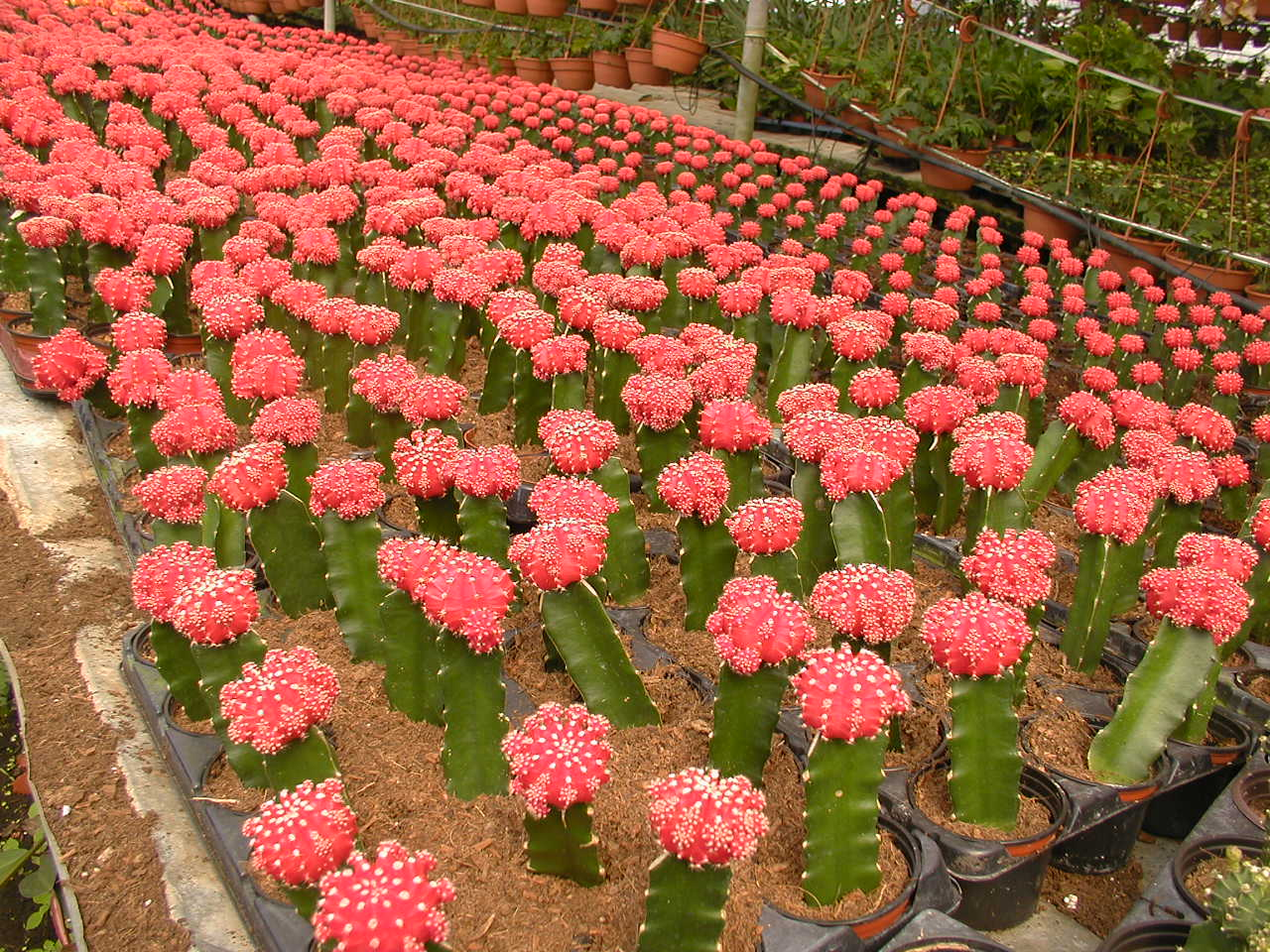
Grafted forms of Gymnocalycium mihanovichii grown in Israel

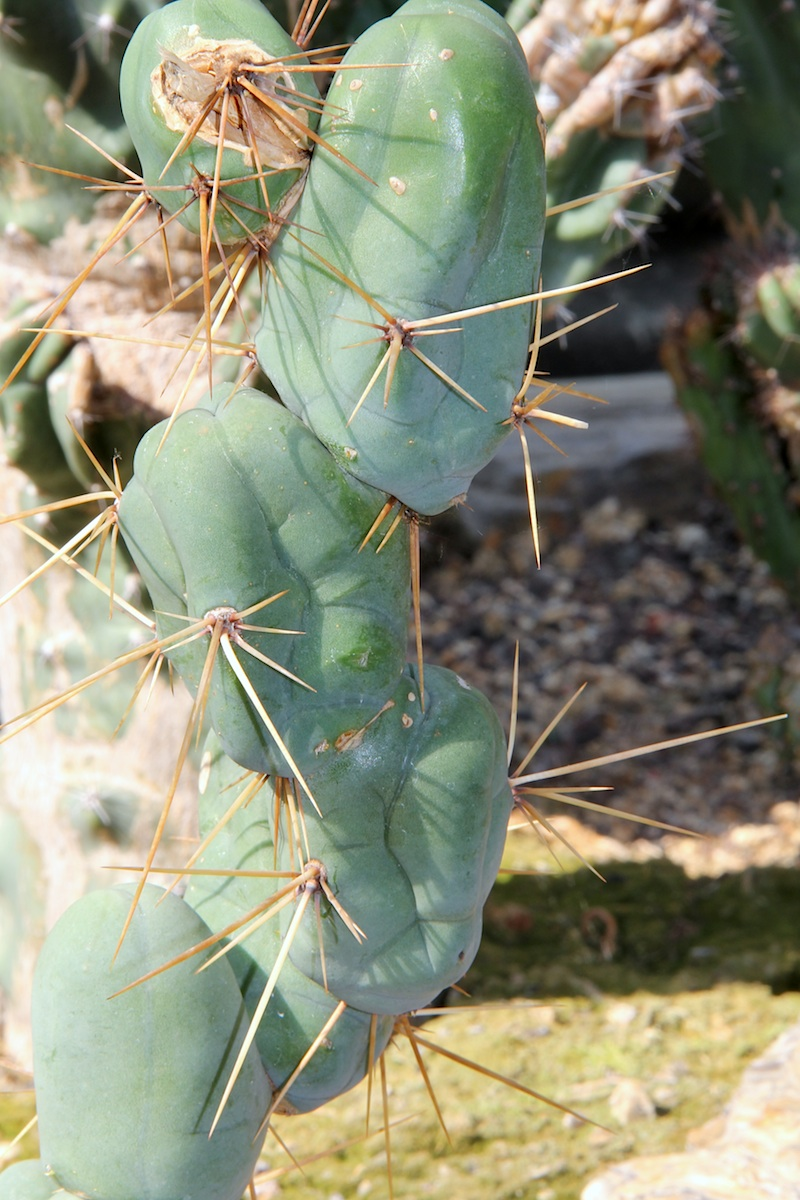
Trichocereus bridgesii monstrose

=== Pests and diseases ===
A range of pests can attack cacti in cultivation including those that feed on sap such as mealybugs, living on both stems and roots; thrips, which particularly attack flowers, scale insects, which are generally only found on stems; whiteflies, which are said to be an "infrequent" pest of cacti; and red spider mites, which are very small but can occur in large numbers, constructing a fine web around themselves and badly marking the cactus via their sap sucking, even if they do not kill it. Some of these pests are resistant to many insecticides, although there are biological controls available. Slugs and snails also eat cacti and the roots of cacti can be eaten by the larvae of sciarid flies and fungus gnats.

Fungi, bacteria and viruses attack cacti, the first two particularly when plants are over-watered. Fusarium rot can gain entry through a wound and cause rotting accompanied by red-violet mold. "Helminosporium rot" is caused by Bipolaris cactivora (syn. Helminosporium cactivorum); Phytophthora species also cause similar rotting in cacti. Fungicides may be of limited value in combating these diseases. Several viruses have been found in cacti, including cactus virus X. These appear to cause only limited visible symptoms, such as chlorotic (pale green) spots and mosaic effects (streaks and patches of paler color). However, in an Agave species, cactus virus X has been shown to reduce growth, particularly when the roots are dry. There are no treatments for viral diseases.

== Bibliography ==
- Anderson, Edward F. (2001), The Cactus Family, Pentland, Oregon: Timber Press, ISBN 978-0-88192-498-5
- Anderson, Miles (1999), Cacti and Succulents: Illustrated Encyclopedia, Oxford: Sebastian Kelly, ISBN 978-1-84081-253-4
- Brown, Roger, "Cultivation of Cacti", in Anderson (2001), pp. 85–92
- Hecht, Hans (1994), Cacti & Succulents (p/b ed.), New York: Sterling, ISBN 978-0-8069-0549-5
- Hewitt, Terry (1993), The Complete Book of Cacti & Succulents, London: Covent Garden Books, ISBN 978-1-85605-402-7
- Innes, Clive (1995), "Cacti", in Innes, Clive & Wall, Bill (eds.), Cacti, Succulents and Bromeliads, London: Cassell for the Royal Horticultural Society, pp. 11–70, ISBN 978-0-304-32076-9
- Keen, Bill (1990), Cacti and Succulents: step-by-step to growing success, Marlborough, Wiltshire: Crowood Press, ISBN 978-1-85223-264-1
- McMillan, A.J.S.; Horobin, J.F. (1995), Christmas Cacti: The genus Schlumbergera and its hybrids (p/b ed.), Sherbourne, Dorset: David Hunt, ISBN 978-0-9517234-6-3
- Pilbeam, John (1987), Cacti for the Connoisseur, London: Batsford, ISBN 978-0-7134-4861-0
