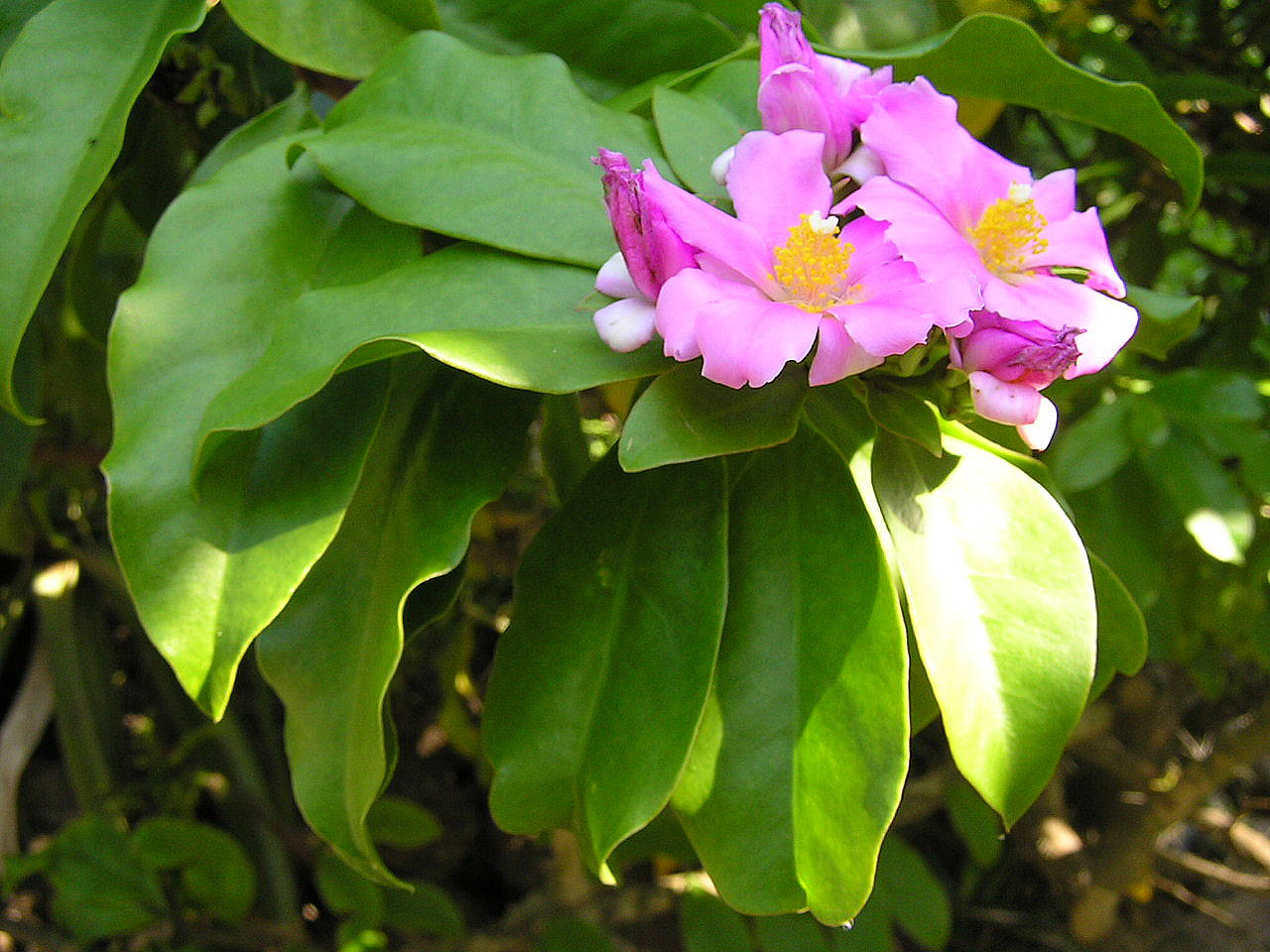
- Rhodocactus grandifolius syn. of Pereskia grandifolia

Scientific classification
- Kingdom: Plantae
- Clade: Embryophytes
- Clade: Tracheophytes
- Clade: Spermatophytes
- Clade: Angiosperms
- Clade: Eudicots
- Order: Caryophyllales
- Family: Cactaceae
- Subfamily: Pereskioideae
- Genus: Rhodocactus (A.Berger) F.M.Knuth

Species
- See text.

= Rhodocactus =

Genus of cactus

Rhodocactus is a possible genus of flowering plants in the cactus family Cactaceae, native to central South America. As of April 2026, it was treated by many sources as a synonym of Pereskia. Unlike most species of cacti, Rhodocactus has persistent leaves and a fully tree-like habit.

== Description ==
Like all cacti, Rhodocactus species have a succulent habit and specialized structures, areoles, that bear spines. They differ from most cacti in having persistent leaves. They grow as trees, 3–7 m (10–23 ft) tall. When mature, their stems develop bark, but its development is delayed, and all the species other than Rhodocactus nemorosus (Pereskia nemorosa) retain stomata. The areoles of Rhodocactus species can form "brachyblasts", called "spur shoots" by Beat Leuenberger. The areole initially forms in the axil of a leaf (stage A in the diagram below). This leaf may be lost, leaving a leaf scar, and leaves may grow on the areole (stage B). The areole may then grow out to form a brachyblast – a short, very crowded shoot that bears leaves (stage C). Later this may form a longer, but still short shoot that has its own areoles (stage D). Asai and Miyata regard the formation of brachyblast leaves as a distinguishing characteristic of the genus in comparison to Pereskia. Rhodocactus flowers are about 3–5 cm (1.2–2.0 in) in diameter.

Areole and brachyblast development in Rhodocactus

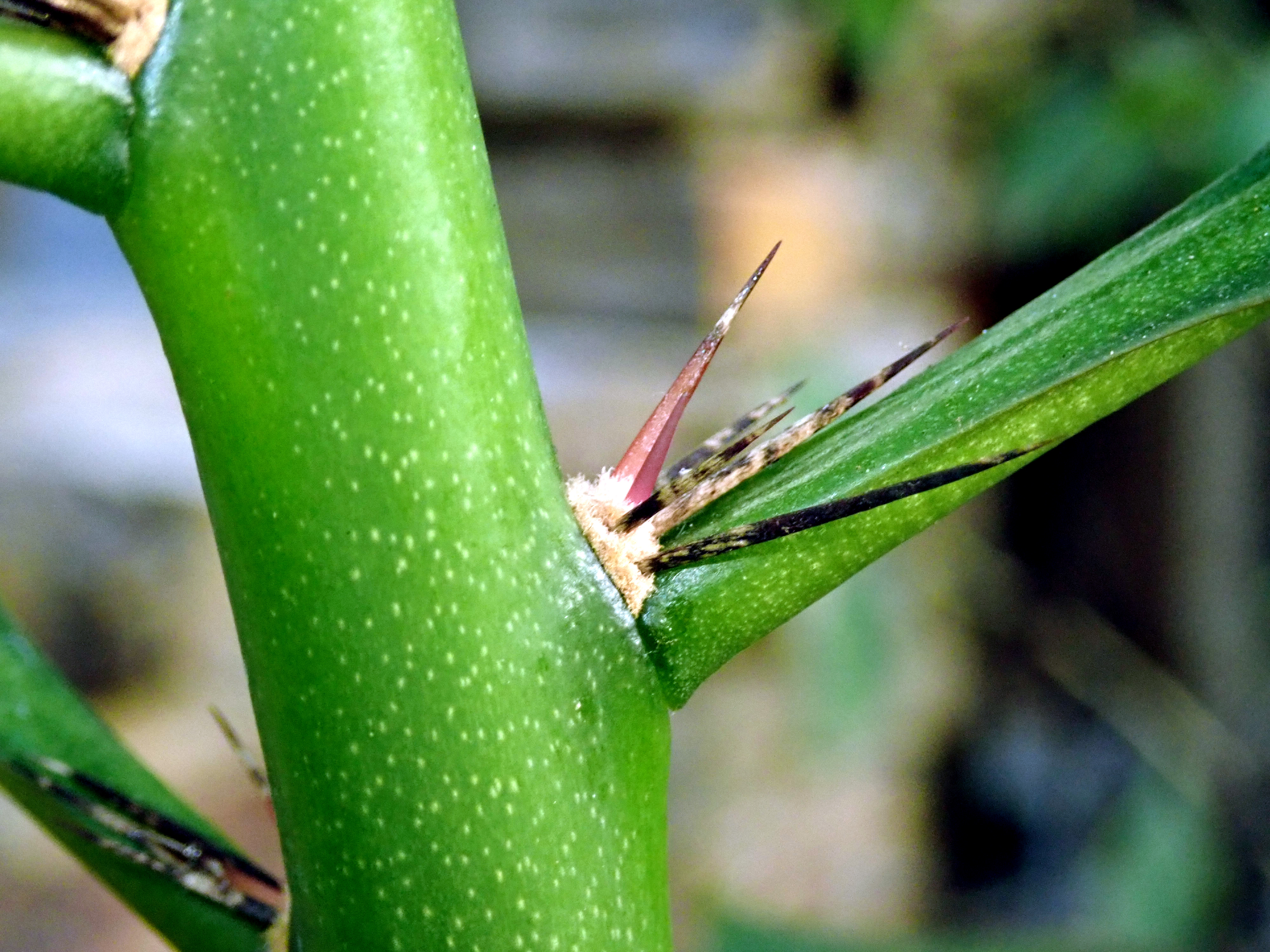
Areole on a young stem of R. grandiflorus is in the axis of the auxoblast leaf (stage A)
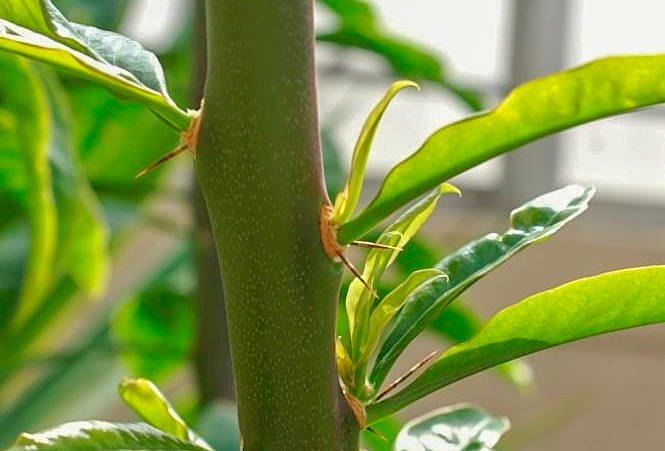
Areoles on this stem of R. grandiflorus have brachyblast leaves (stage B)

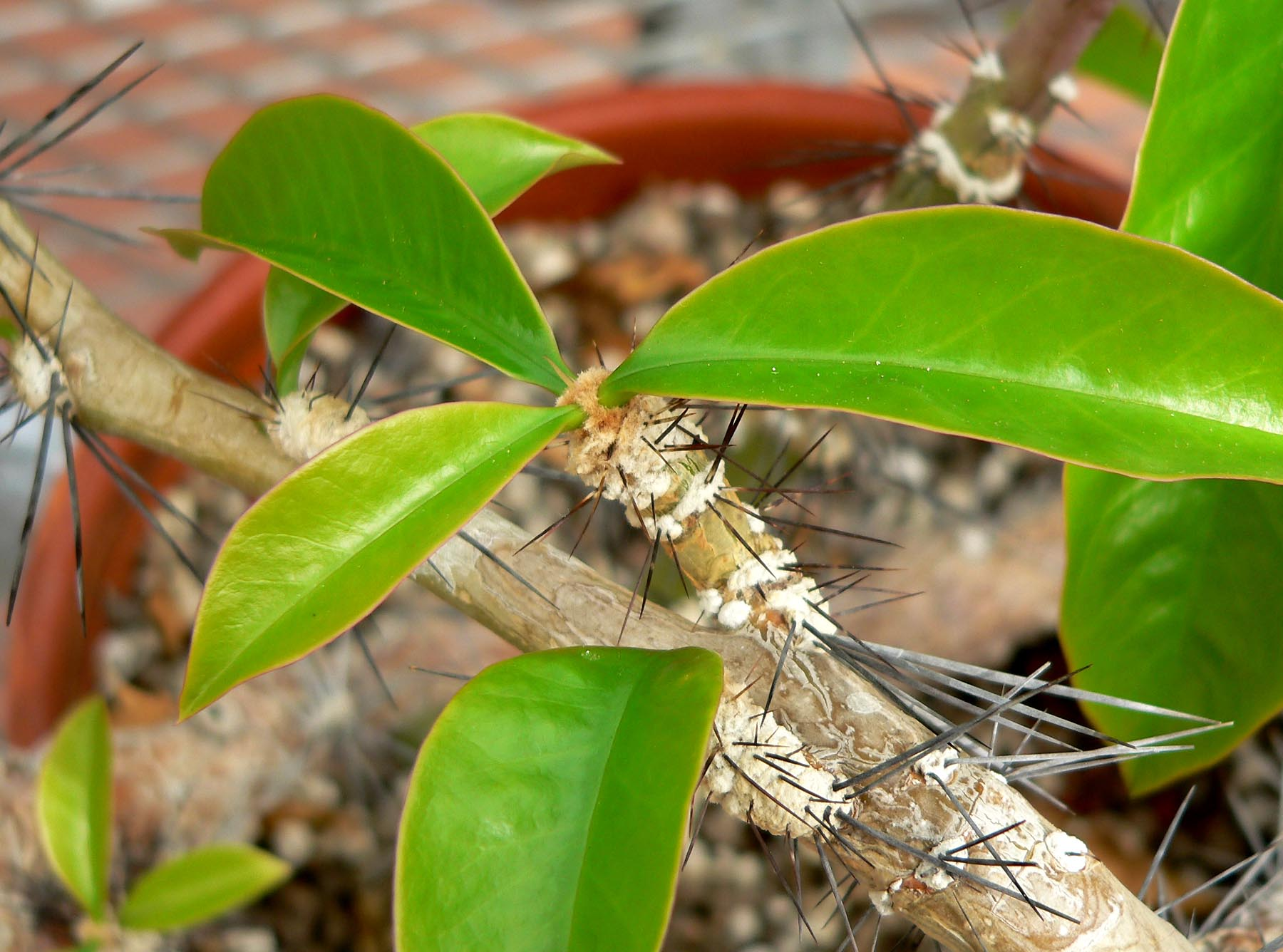
Short shoot of R. grandiflorus (stage D)

== Taxonomy ==
Rhodocactus was originally described as a subgenus of Pereskia by Alwin Berger, and was raised to a genus in 1936 by Frederik Marcus Knuth. The genus was later sunk back into in a broadly defined genus Pereskia. Molecular phylogenetic studies from 2005 onwards suggested that when circumscribed in this way, Pereskia was not monophyletic, and consisted of three clades. By 2016, each clade was recognized as a separate genus, one of which is Rhodocactus. Only the type species of Knuth's circumscription of the genus, Rhodocactus grandifolius, belonged to the clade re-described as Rhodocactus. The other species were mostly newly transferred from Pereskia.

A consensus cladogram from a 2005 study is shown below with the more recent generic assignments added. It shows that the three genera are basal to the rest of the cacti.

- Cactaceae
  - Leuenbergeria
  - - - Pereskia s.s.
      - Rhodocactus
    - core cacti

In 2025, a major study of the phylogenomics and classification of cacti by De Vos et al. did not recognize Rhodocactus, based on sparse taxon sampling. As of April 2026, Plants of the World Online agreed, accepting Rhodocactus as a synonym of Pereskia.

=== Species ===
Species that have been placed in Rhodocactus include:

Image	Name in Rhodocactus	Accepted name	Distribution
	Rhodocactus bahiensis (Gürke) I.Asai & K.Miyata	Pereskia bahiensis Gürke	Brazil
	Rhodocactus grandifolius (Haw.) F.M.Knuth	Pereskia grandifolia Haw.	Eastern and southern Brazil
	Rhodocactus nemorosus (Rojas Acosta) I.Asai & K.Miyata	Pereskia nemorosa Rojas Acosta	Brazil, Paraguay, Uruguay and northeast Argentina.
	Rhodocactus sacharosa (Griseb.) Backeb.	Pereskia sacharosa Griseb.	Bolivia and west-central Brazil to Paraguay and northern Argentina
	Rhodocactus stenanthus (F.Ritter) I.Asai & K.Miyata	Pereskia stenantha F.Ritter	Brazil

Other species that have also been placed in Rhodocactus include:

- Rhodocactus bleo (F.M.Knuth) F.M.Knuth = Leuenbergeria bleo F.M.Knuth) Lodé
- Rhodocactus guamacho (F.A.C.Weber) F.M.Knuth = Leuenbergeria guamacho (F.A.C.Weber) Lodé
- Rhodocactus horridus (DC.) F.M.Knuth = Pereskia horrida D.C.
- Rhodocactus lychnidiflorus (D.C.) F.M.Knuth = Leuenbergeria lychnidiflora (D.C.) Lodé
- Rhodocactus portulacifolius (L.) F.M.Knuth = Leuenbergeria portulacifolia (L.) Lodé
- Rhodocactus zinniiflorus (D.C.) F.M.Knuth = Leuenbergeria zinniiflora (D.C.) Lodé
