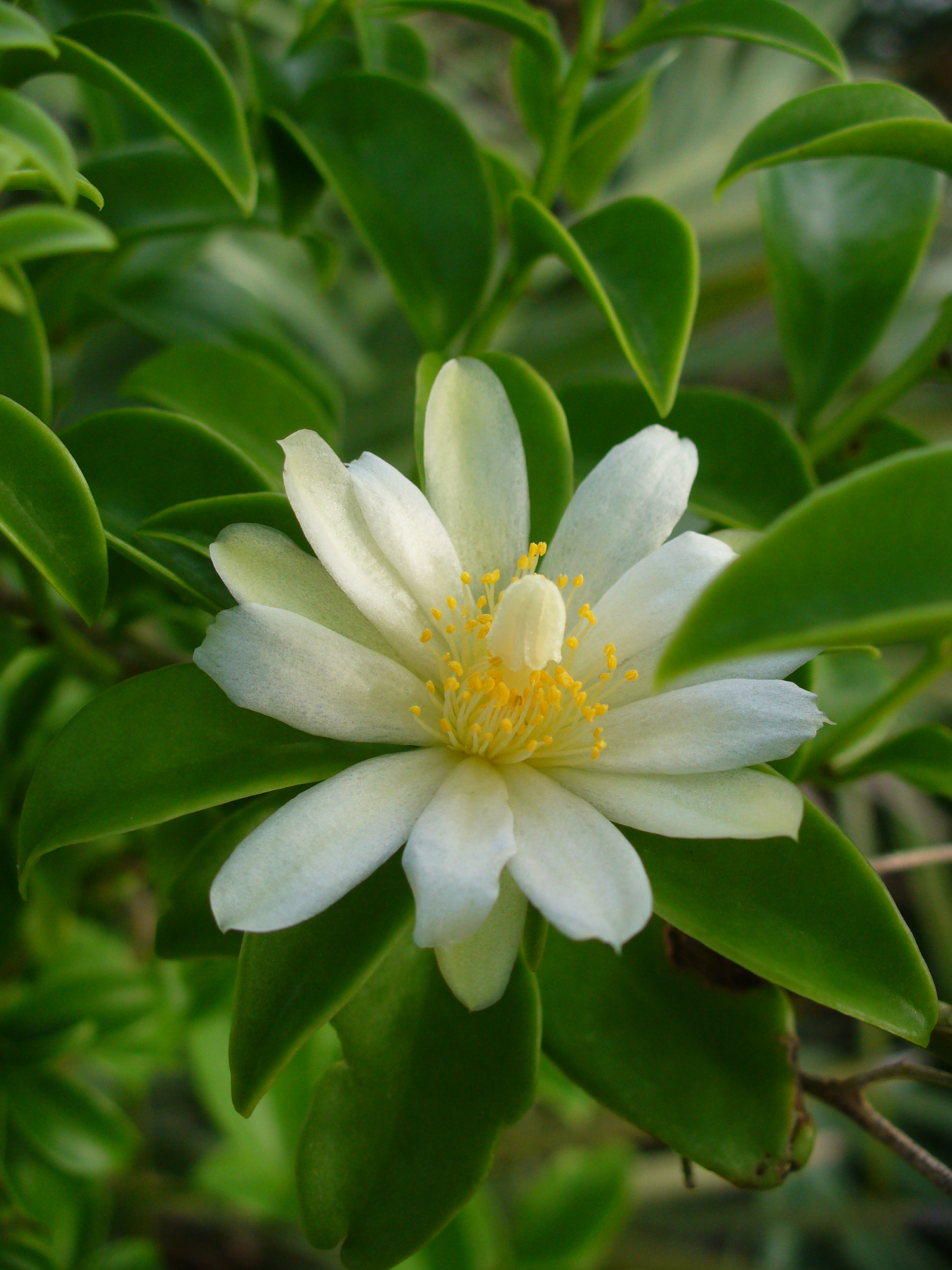
- Pereskia aculeata

Scientific classification
- Kingdom: Plantae
- Clade: Tracheophytes
- Clade: Angiosperms
- Clade: Eudicots
- Order: Caryophyllales
- Family: Cactaceae
- Subfamily: Pereskioideae; Engelm.
- Genus: Pereskia; Mill.

Species
- See text.

Synonyms
- Peirescia Zucc., orth. var.; Rhodocactus (A.Berger) F.M.Knuth

= Pereskia =

Genus of cacti

Pereskia is a small genus of about ten species of cacti that do not look much like other types of cacti, having substantial leaves and non-succulent stems. The genus is named after Nicolas-Claude Fabri de Peiresc, a 16th-century French botanist. The genus was more widely circumscribed until molecular phylogenetic studies showed that it was paraphyletic. Some species have since been transferred to Leuenbergeria, and also to Rhodocactus by some sources, although not by Plants of the World Online as of April 2026. Although Pereskia does not resemble other cacti in its overall morphology, close examination shows spines developing from areoles, and the distinctive floral cup of the cactus family.

== Description ==
The species of Pereskia as the genus is now circumscribed share many features in common with Leuenbergeria, which was formerly included in a more broadly defined Pereskia. They are shrubs, trees or climbing vines, with maximum heights varying between 3 and 10 m. Unlike the great majority of species of cacti, they have persistent leaves. Like all cacti, they have spines borne on areoles. Their succulent leaves are longer than wide, reaching 11 cm by 5 cm in the case of P. aculeata. Their flowers are borne in small clusters or are solitary, except for P. aculeata which can have inflorescences of 70 or more individual flowers. P. aculeata has edible fruits, 1.5–2.5 cm in diameter; the other species have smaller fruits, only up to 6 mm in diameter in the case of P. horrida. Unlike Leuenbergeria, the stems of Pereskia delay forming bark and have stomata.

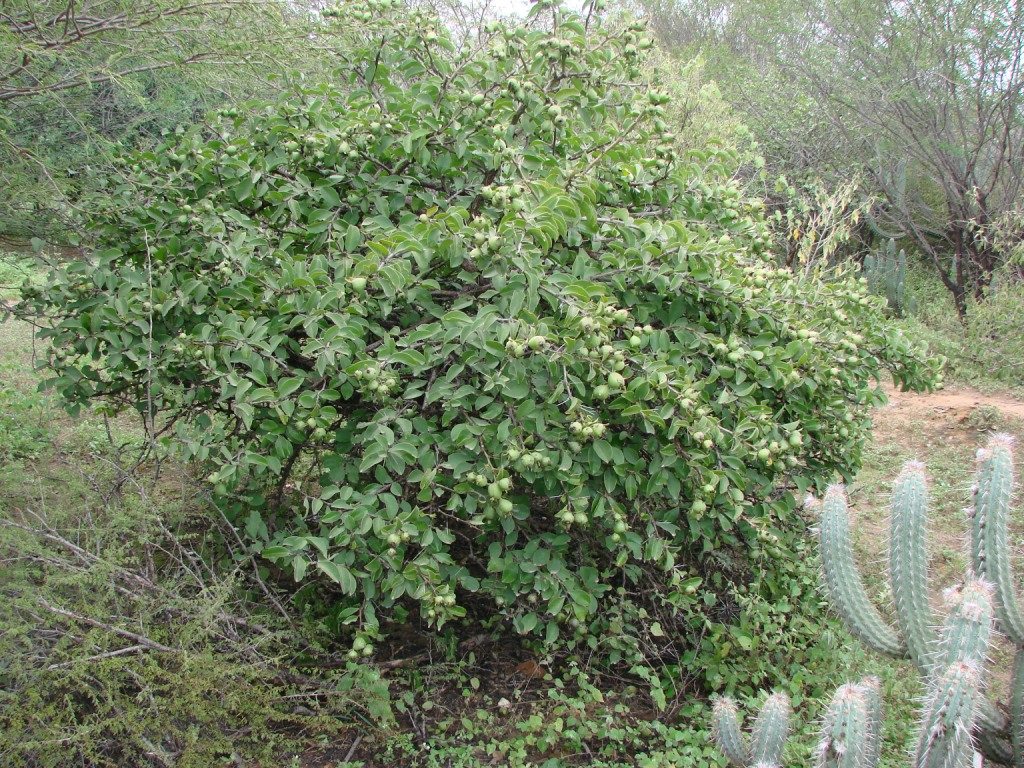
Habit of Pereskia aculeata

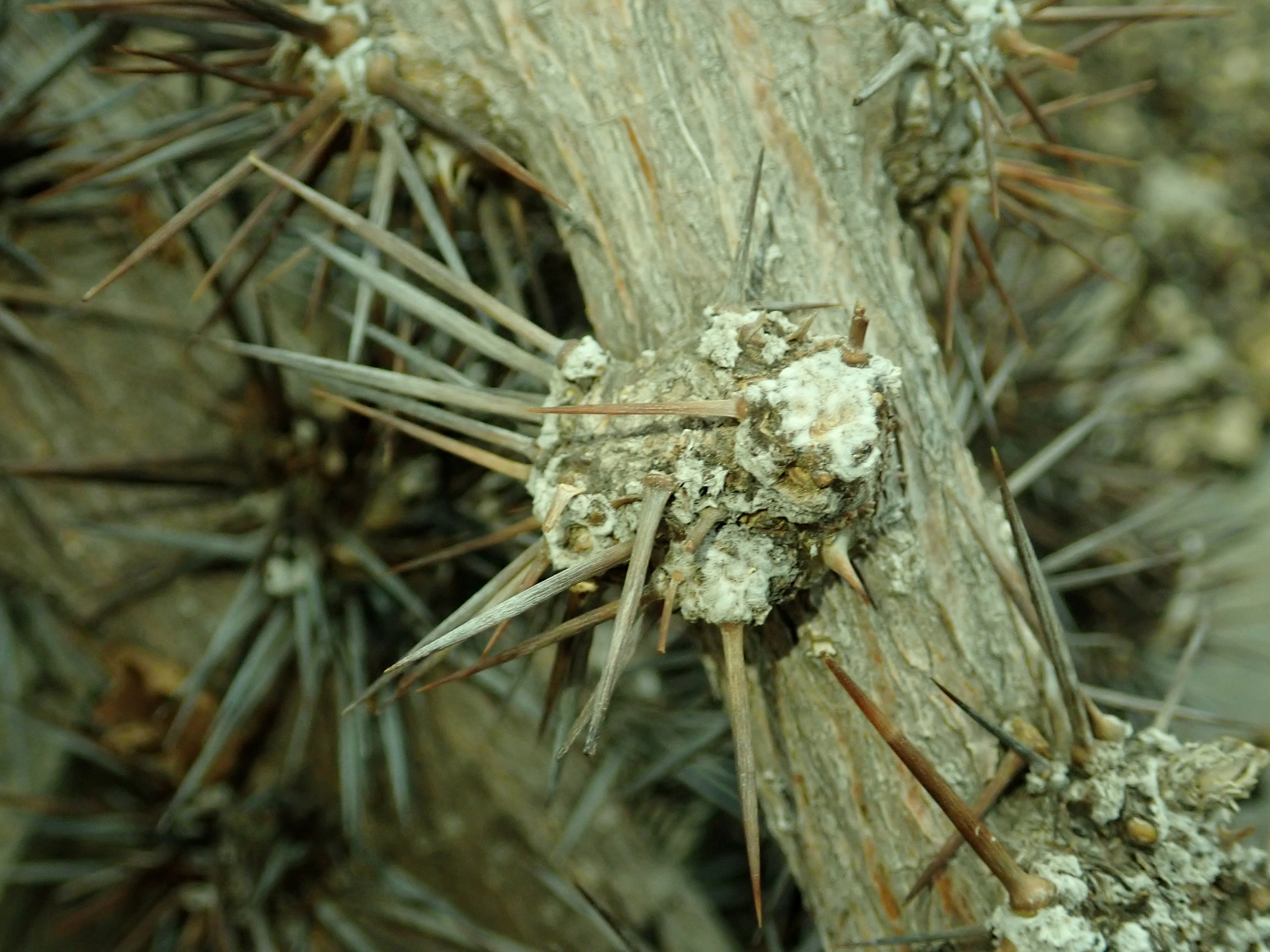
Areoles and spines of Pereskia aculeata

== Taxonomy ==
It is likely that Charles Plumier collected the first Pereskia specimens from the West Indies in the late 17th century. Plumier described two species of Pereskia in 1703. Linnaeus did not accept Plumier's genus, placing the two species in Cactus, as C. pereskia and C. portacifolius. Philip Miller published Pereskia in 1754, and as pre-Linnaean names are not accepted under the International Code of Nomenclature for algae, fungi, and plants, Miller rather than Plumier is credited as the author.

=== Phylogeny and evolution ===
A 2005 study suggested that the genus Pereskia as then circumscribed (Pereskia sensu lato) was basal within the Cactaceae, and confirmed earlier suggestions that it was paraphyletic, i.e. did not include all the descendants of a common ancestor. The Bayesian consensus cladogram from this study is shown below with more recent generic assignments added.

- Cactaceae
  - Clade A
    Northern clade (→ Leuenbergeria)
  - caulocacti
    - Clade B
      - Andean clade (→ Pereskia s.s.)
      - southern South American (SSA) clade (→ Rhodocactus)
    - core cacti
      - Opuntioideae
      - - Maihuenia
        - Cactoideae

Pereskia s.l. divided into two main clades which differed in their geographical distribution. Clade A, the Northern clade, comprised species mainly found around the Gulf of Mexico and the Caribbean Sea. Clade B comprised species found mainly in South America south of the Amazon basin, either in the Andes (the Andean clade) or further south (the southern South American or SSA clade). Subsequent studies confirmed the division of Pereskia s.l. into these three clades.

Species of Clade A always lack two key features of the stem present in most of the remaining "caulocacti": like most non-cacti, their stems begin to form bark early in the plant's life, and they also lack stomata – structures which control the admission of air into a plant and hence control photosynthesis. By contrast, species of Clade B typically delay forming bark and have stomata on their stems, thus giving the stem the potential to become a major organ for photosynthesis. The subclades of Clade B, the Andean and SSA clades, also show consistent differences. The SSA clade is distinctly tree-like with pink flowers and leaves as well as spines on its areoles, which can grow out to form short, densely crowded branchlets or brachyblasts, which produce leaves. The Andean clade consists of climbers or undershrubs with smaller flowers and does not form brachyblasts.

In 2013, it was suggested that two distinct genera should be recognized, Clade A becoming Leuenbergeria and Clade B becoming a more tightly circumscribed Pereskia sensu stricto. In 2016, a further division of Clade B into two genera was proposed, with the Andean clade becoming a reduced Pereskia s.s. and the southern South American clade becoming the restored genus Rhodocactus. In 2025, a major study of the phylogenomics and classification of cacti by De Vos et al. did not accept Rhodocactus, based on sparse taxon sampling. As of April 2026, Plants of the World Online did not recognize Rhodocactus.

=== Species ===
As of April 2026, Plants of the World Online placed the following species in Pereskia:

Image	Scientific name	Distribution
	Pereskia aculeata Mill.	Panama, French Guiana, Guyana, Suriname, Venezuela, Brazil, Colombia, Argentina and Paraguay
	Pereskia bahiensis Gürke	
	Pereskia diaz-romeroana Cárdenas	Bolivia
	Pereskia grandifolia Haw.	
	Pereskia horrida DC	Peru
	Pereskia nemorosa Rojas Acosta	
	Pereskia sacharosa Griseb.	
	Pereskia stenantha F.Ritter	
	Pereskia violacea (Leuenb.) N.P.Taylor	
	Pereskia weberiana K.Schum.	Bolivia

Former species placed in Leuenbergeria are:

- Pereskia aureiflora F.Ritter = Leuenbergeria aureiflora (F. Ritter) Lodé
- Pereskia bleo (Kunth) DC = Leuenbergeria bleo (Kunth) Lodé
- Pereskia guamacho F.A.C.Weber = Leuenbergeria guamacho (F.A.C. Weber) Lodé
- Pereskia lychnidiflora DC = Leuenbergeria lychnidiflora (DC.) Lodé
- Pereskia marcanoi Areces = Leuenbergeria marcanoi (Areces) Lodé
- Pereskia portulacifolia (L.) DC = Leuenbergeria portulacifolia (L.) Lodé
- Pereskia quisqueyana Alain = Leuenbergeria quisqueyana (Alain) Lodé
- Pereskia zinniiflora DC = Leuenbergeria zinniiflora (DC.) Lodé

==== Synonyms ====
Pereskia colombiana = Leuenbergeria guamacho
Pereskia corrugata = Leuenbergeria bleo
Pereskia cubensis = Leuenbergeria zinniiflora
Pereskia godseffiana = Pereskia aculeata
Pereskia humboldtii = Pereskia horrida
Pereskia philippi = Maihuenia poeppigii
Pereskia subulata = Austrocylindropuntia subulata
Pereskia vargasii = Pereskia horrida
Pereskia zehntneri = Quiabentia zehntneri
Pereskia zinniaefolia = Leuenbergeria ziniiflora

== Distribution ==
The species of Pereskia are native to southern tropical and southern South America. Pereskia aculeata has the widest distribution, and is also found in Panama. It has been introduced into several other parts of the world, including Mexico and the United States, South Africa, China and Australia.

== Uses ==
The genus is not of great economic importance. Pereskia aculeata has edible fruit and is widely cultivated. The fruit contains numerous small seeds. It somewhat resembles a gooseberry in appearance and is of excellent flavor. This plant is a declared weed in South Africa. It can also be used as a rootstock for grafting of Schlumbergera to create miniature trees.
