= Apple cactus =

Apple cactus is a common name for several plants and may refer to:

- Cereus repandus, Peruvian apple cactus
- Harrisia, applecactus
- Pereskia aculeata, blade-apple cactus

== See also ==
- cactus apple
