= Pereskia diaz-romeroana =

Conservation status
- Least Concern (IUCN 3.1)

Scientific classification
- Kingdom: Plantae
- Clade: Tracheophytes
- Clade: Angiosperms
- Clade: Eudicots
- Order: Caryophyllales
- Family: Cactaceae
- Genus: Pereskia
- Species: P. diaz-romeroana

Binomial name
- Pereskia diaz-romeroana Cárdenas

Species of plant

Pereskia diaz-romeroana, locally known commonly as uturunku, is a species of succulent flowering plant in the genus Pereskia, within the family Cactaceae. It is endemic to central Bolivia, specifically to the departments of Cochabamba, Chuquisaca, and Santa Cruz.

== Description ==
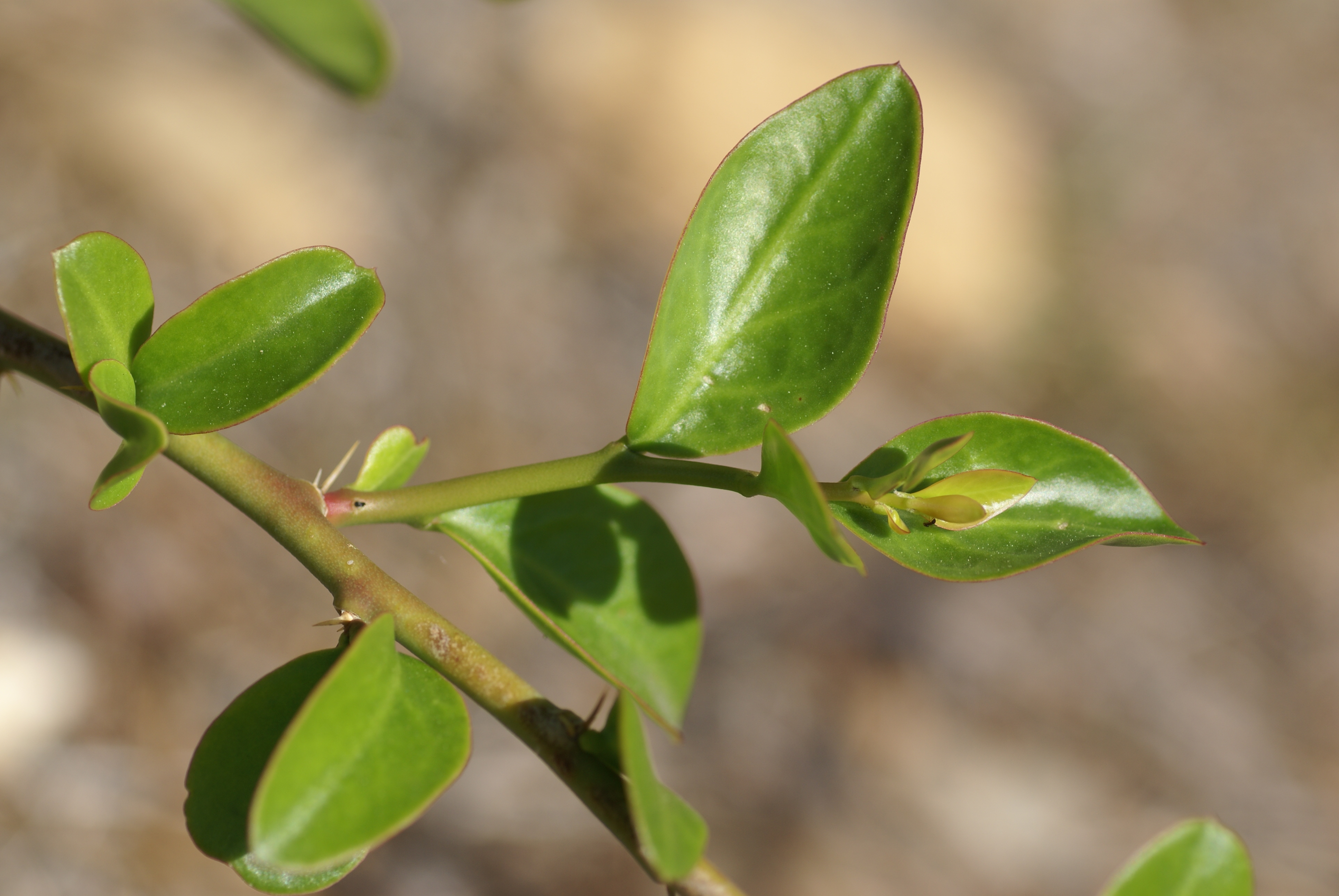
Leaves

Pereskia diaz-romeroana is a species of cactus with a treelike growth form that reaches 0.5–3 m in height. It exhibits both basitonic and epitonic branching, with erect or arched stems that can grow straight or in a zigzag. The lateral branches are plagiotropic, and the stems can reach 2 cm in diameter. The bark is gray or brown, and falls off easily. The internodes usually measure 0.5–2 cm long and exhibit reduced periderm formation. The root system develops fleshy swellings which are fusiform to globose in shape; these can reach 30 cm in length and 4 cm thick in small cultivated specimens. However, they are likely larger on adult plants.

Areole within a leaf axil

The leaves are elliptical or obovate, or in some individuals widely obovate. They measure 2–4 cm in length and 1.2-2.2 cm in width. They are attached to the stem by an inconspicuous petiole, which is 1–2 cm in length. The leaf blade is 0.7-0.8 mm thick, with a cuneate or cuneate-attenuate base which is occasionally rounded in especially wide leaves and an acute apex. The venation is pinnate, with a primary vein that is slightly prominent on the abaxial surface when the leaf is newly developed. Also present are 3-5 arched secondary veins that diverge at 25-30º (or occasionally up to 40º) angles. These nerves are less visible on new leaves. The areoles are situated in the leaf axils. On younger stems, they measure 2–3 mm in diameter and have short, gray-brown tomenta, along with larger shaggy white trichomes, which are 3–4 mm in length. The trichomes are darker in color at their bases. On older stems, the areoles grow to 6–7 mm in diameter and develop spines, although they do not produce spurs.

The areoles on young stems exhibit 2-7 extended spines, which are 0.5–3 cm in length and 0.4-0.6 mm thick. These spines are thicker at the base, and are often flattened, bulbose, or conical in shape. They are straw-colored to brown, or yellow on the newest shoots. The areoles on older stems can develop 12 or more spines each. These are of unequal length, and can grow to 0.5–3 cm long and 0.8–1 mm thick. They are usually flattened or slightly contorted, with bases up to 2 mm in diameter. They are generally straight, although some are slightly curved or pointed downwards.

Flower

The flowers are borne on dense cymose-paniculate inflorescences. They may also be solitary at terminal or axillary positions, although they are usually densely packed in groups of 2-5 flowers per areole due to the proliferation of the receptacle. Flowers may be hypogynous or perigynous and pedicellate or sessile. They grow to approximately 1–2 cm in diameter. The receptacle is spiral-shaped or cup-shaped, and grows to 4–5 mm in diameter. The lower areoles are pilose and occasionally possess one or two flowers, while the upper areoles have numerous silky or shaggy hairs, approximately 5 mm in length, which often almost completely cover the flower buds. The lower bracts of the receptacle may be absent; when present, they number up to 4. They appear leaflike and are elliptical-obovate or lanceolate in shape, measuring 0.8-1.6 cm in length and 0.3–1 cm in width. The upper bracts are smaller, generally 5-7 (but occasionally up to 9) in number. They are erect, and are oblong, linear, or triangular in shape, and are approximately 1 mm in length. They are green in color, with a fleshy texture.

The external petaloid sepals number between 2 and 4, are ovate in shape, and grow to 5–7 mm in length and 3–5 mm in width. They have wide bases, and are green in color with pink or red-purple margins. The petals vary in color from pink to an intense red-purple. They are narrowly or broadly obovate, measuring 8–12 mm long and 4–6 mm wide, and have a cuneate base and a rounded or acute apex. Each flower has 50-70 erect stamens. The filaments measure 3–7 mm in length and are intense pink to red-purple in color, generally lighter at the base. The anthers are yellow and grow to 0.7-0.8 mm in length.

The ovary may be either superior or partially inferior, and is only attached to the receptacle at its base. The upper part resembles a thickened style base, and is approximately 1.5 mm in diameter. The styles are white and measure 5–7 mm in length. There are 4-6 lobes on the ovary; these are suberect, white, and measure 1–2 mm in length. Each flower contains 10-20 ovules.

The fruits are fleshy, soft, and juicy, with a broadly obovate or depressed subglobose shape. They measure 4–6 mm in diameter when dry and up to 13 mm in diameter when fresh. Their surfaces are black, shiny, and smooth, interrupted only by several leaf scars and transverse linear areoles with white trichomes measuring 2–3 mm in length. The navel is narrow and depressed, and contains the upper bracts, persistent trichomes, and wrinkled flower remnants. The pericarp is thick and juicy, and is brown to dark purple in color when ripe. The fruits completely ripen within a few weeks of flowering.

There are approximately five seeds per fruit. These are obovate in shape and measure 1.8–2 mm in length, 1.3-1.6 mm in width, and 0.7–1 mm thick. They are black, shiny, and exhibit shallow peripheral ribs on their otherwise-smooth surfaces. The hilum is lunate in shape and brown or cream-colored, with a central funicular scar. The area around the micropyle forms a small protuberance which may or may not be conspicuous.

== Distribution and habitat ==
Pereskia diaz-romeroana is endemic to Central Bolivia, in the departments of Cochabamba, Chuquisaca, and Santa Cruz. It is found in the seasonally-dry tropical biome at elevations of 1100 to 2000 m above sea level, where it grows in dry forests.

== Taxonomy ==
Pereskia diaz-romeroana was described by the Bolivian botanist Martín Cárdenas Hermosa and published for the first time in the scientific journal Lilloa; Revista de Botánica 23: 15 in 1950.

Etymology

- Pereskia: The genus name honors the French humanist, historian, and astronomer Nicolas-Claude Fabri de Peiresc (1580–1637), who Latinized his name as Peireskius. During the 19th century, certain authors introduced the alternate spellings "Peirescia" and "Peireskia", with the intention of correcting the original name (Pereskia). However, a proposal presented in 1943 to use the spelling "Peireskia" was unanimously rejected, leading to the continuous and universal use of the original name.
- diaz-romeroana: The specific epithet honors the Bolivian naturalist Belisario Díaz Romero (1870–1940).

== Conservation status ==
On the IUCN Red List, Pereskia diaz-romeroana is classified as being "Least Concern" (LC), signifying that it currently faces a low risk of extinction. This classification is based on the fact that this species is relatively common throughout its geographical range. To date, no significant risks to its survival have been identified.

== Cultivation ==
This species is cultivated mainly as an ornamental. It may be propagated vegetatively by cuttings, or by seed.

== Gallery ==
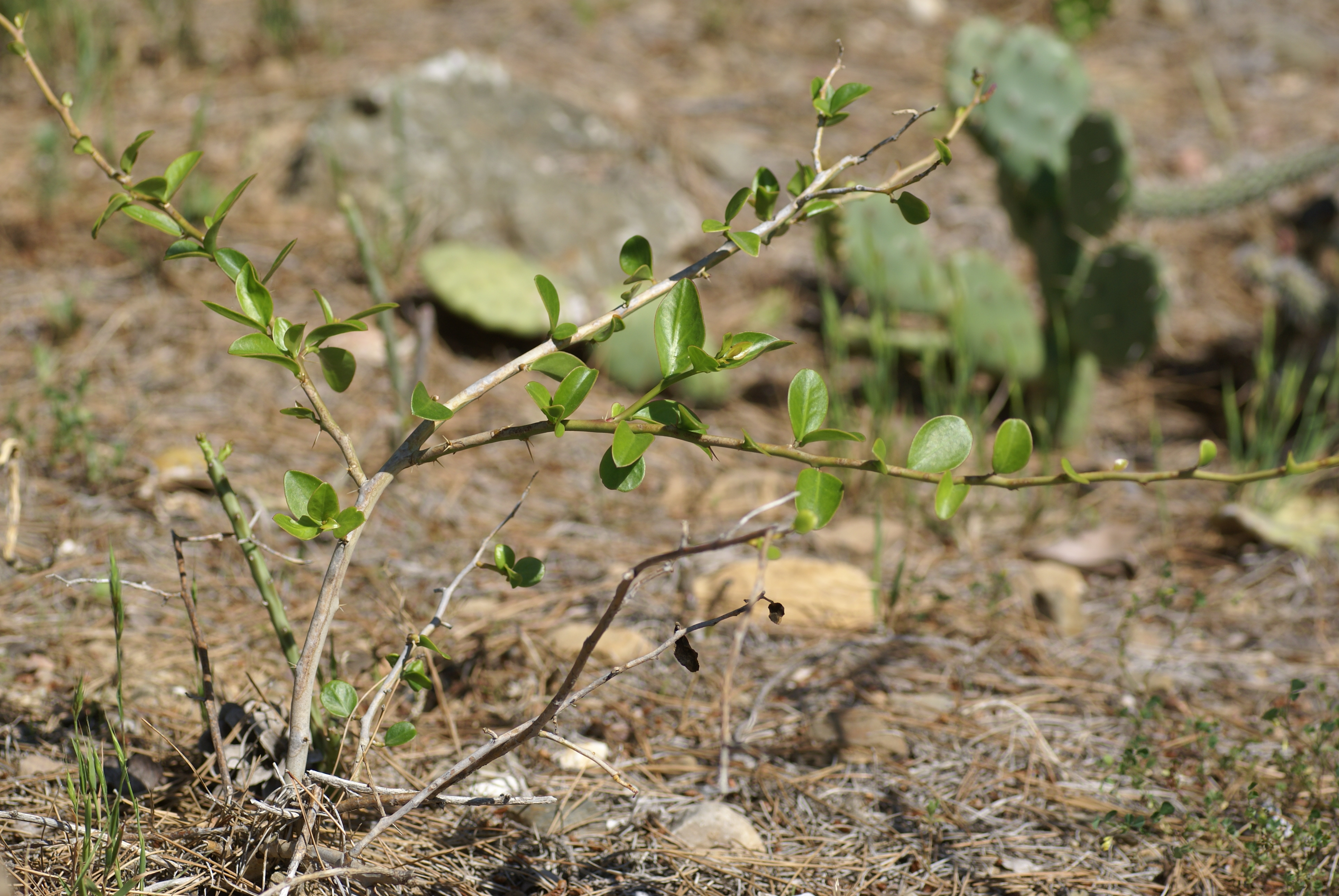
Plant cultivated at Jardín Botánico Histórico La Concepción, Málaga, Spain

Stems

Leaves

Spines

Inflorescence
