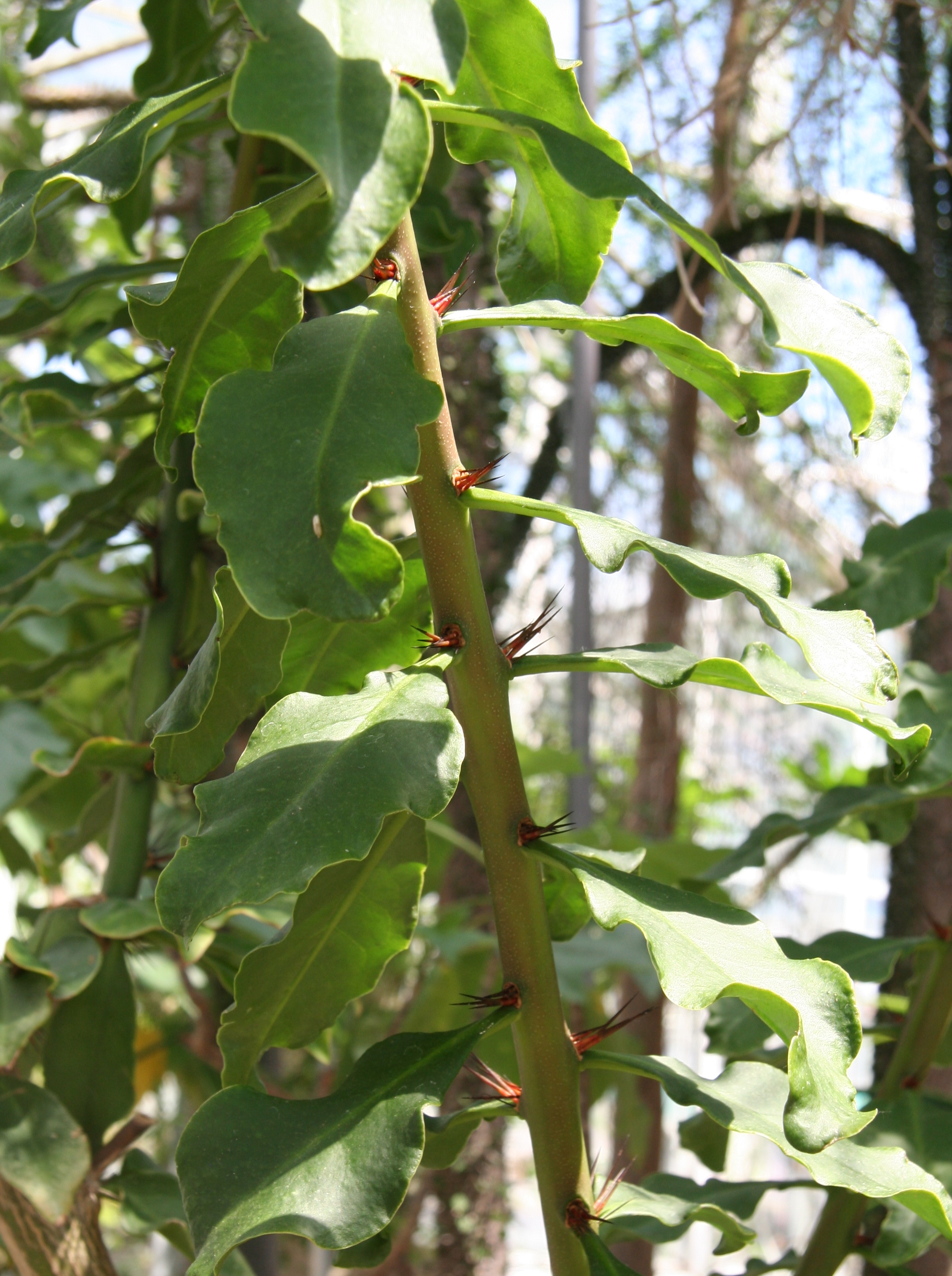
- Stem with areoles, in cultivation

Conservation status
- Least Concern (IUCN 3.1)

Scientific classification
- Kingdom: Plantae
- Clade: Embryophytes
- Clade: Tracheophytes
- Clade: Angiosperms
- Clade: Eudicots
- Order: Caryophyllales
- Family: Cactaceae
- Genus: Pereskia
- Species: P. stenantha

Binomial name
- Pereskia stenantha F.Ritter

Synonyms
- Rhodocactus stenanthus (F.Ritter) I.Asai & K.Miyata

= Pereskia stenantha =

Species of cactus

Pereskia stenantha, synonym Rhodocactus stenanthus, is a species of cactus that is endemic to Brazil. Like all species in the genus Pereskia, and unlike most cacti, it has persistent leaves. In its native locality, it is sometimes used in hedges.

== Description ==
Pereskia stenantha grows as a small tree or a shrub, usually reaching 2–4 m (7–13 ft) high, occasionally 6 m (20 ft), with trunks to about 15 cm (6 in) in diameter in large specimens. The young twigs, 4–6 mm (0.2–0.2 in) thick, have variable numbers of stomata. Mature stems develop grayish-brown bark. Like all species of Pereskia, and unlike most other cacti, P. stenantha has persistent leaves, that are variable in shape and size. The very largest are up to 15 cm (5.9 in) long and 9 cm (3.5 in) wide, but more usually they are 7–11 cm (2.8–4.3 in) by 4–6 cm (1.6–2.4 in). The fleshy leaves are often folded upwards along the midrib and have short petioles, 2–10 mm (0.1–0.4 in) long. The areoles bear leaves (brachyblast leaves) along with spines. The areoles on the twigs have up to seven spines, those on the trunks may have about 40, each up to 5 cm (2.0 in) long. The flowers are orange-red on the outside and pink inside and are borne in terminal or axillary inflorescences of 1–15 forming dense clusters. Individual flowers are urn-shaped (urceolate) and do not open widely, reaching only 1–2 cm (0.4–0.8 in) across. The fruits are variable in shape, 3–7 cm (1.2–2.8 in) long, green or yellowish-green when ripe, and contain many glossy black seeds. In its native habitat, P. stenanthas flowers in the spring and summer, from November to April.

In all features other than the flowers, P. stenantha closely resembles P. bahiensis. The shape, colour and orientation of the flowers suggests they may be pollinated by hummingbirds.

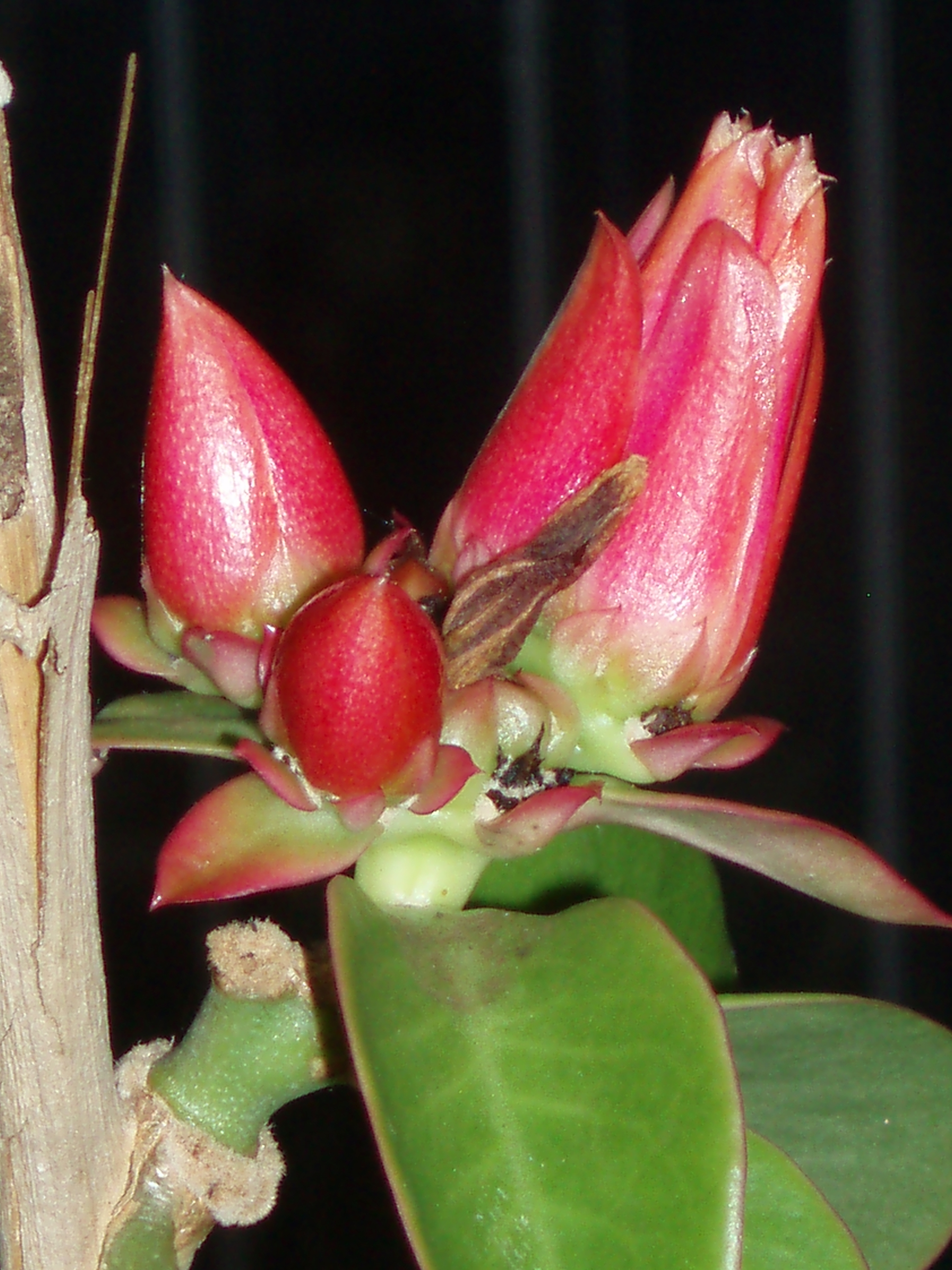
Flower buds

== Taxonomy ==
The species was first described by Friedrich Ritter in 1979. Molecular phylogenetic studies from 2005 onwards suggested that when Pereskia was broadly circumscribed, it was not monophyletic, and consisted of three clades. In 2016, the genus Rhodocactus was revived for one of these clades, with P. stenantha included as R. stenanthus. In 2025, a major study of the phylogenomics and classification of cacti by De Vos et al. did not recognize Rhodocactus, based on sparse taxon sampling. As of April 2026, Plants of the World Online agreed, accepting Rhodocactus stenanthus as a synonym of Pereskia stenantha.

== Distribution and habitat ==
Pereskia stenantha is native to northeast and southeast Brazil. In the state of Bahia, it occurs in caatinga (subtropical and tropical dry shrubland) at altitudes of about 400–600 m (1,300–2,000 ft).

== Conservation ==
Pereskia stenantha has been assessed as Least Concern, with no major threats. is a common species with a stable population trend and regenerates well after disturbance.

== Uses ==
In the areas where it grows, local people may plant Pereskia stenantha in hedges.
