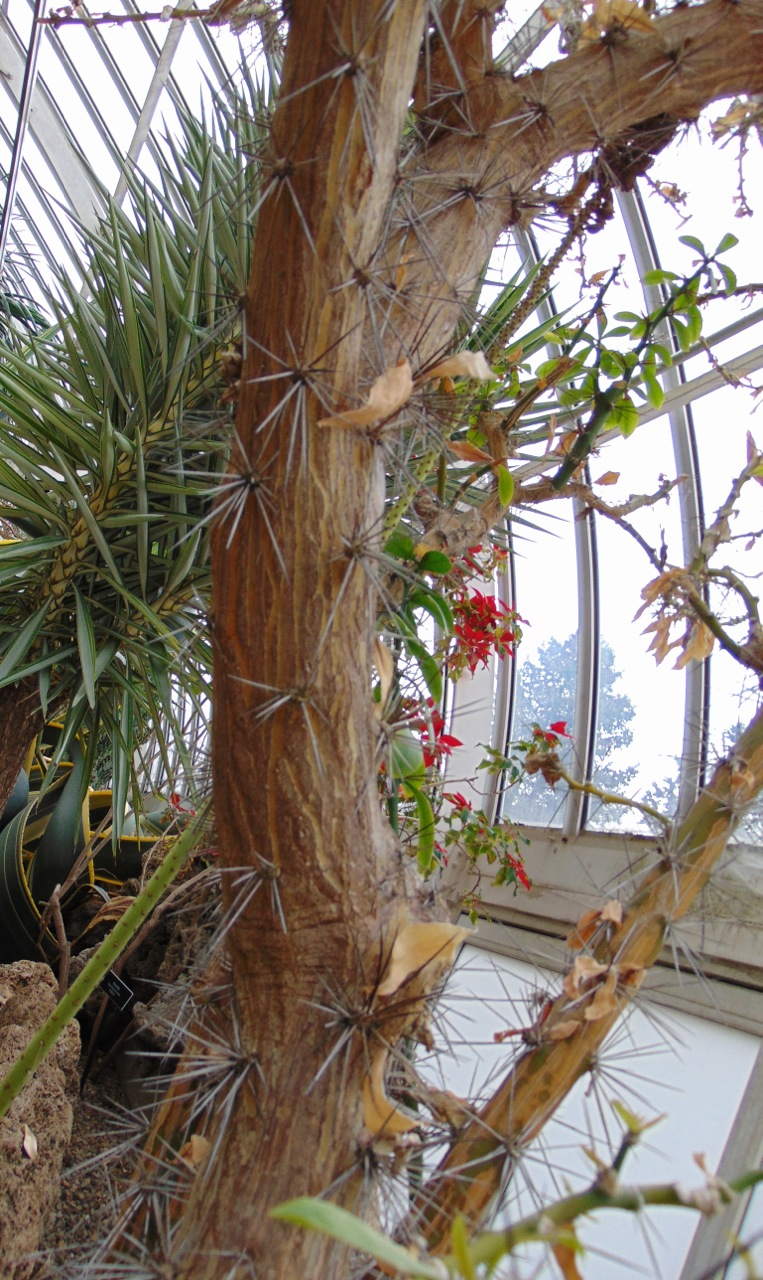
- In cultivation in the Phipps Conservatory and Botanical Gardens, Pittsburgh

Scientific classification
- Kingdom: Plantae
- Clade: Tracheophytes
- Clade: Angiosperms
- Clade: Eudicots
- Order: Caryophyllales
- Family: Cactaceae
- Genus: Pereskia
- Species: P. nemorosa

Binomial name
- Pereskia nemorosa Rojas Acosta

Synonyms
- Pereskia amapola F.A.C.Weber; Pereskia argentina F.A.C.Weber; Rhodocactus nemorosus (Rojas Acosta) I.Asai & K.Miyata

= Pereskia nemorosa =

Species of cactus

Pereskia nemorosa, synonym Rhodocactus nemorosus, is a species of flowering plant in the cactus family Cactaceae, native to southern Brazil, Paraguay, Uruguay and northeast Argentina. Like all species in the genus Pereskia and unlike most cacti, it has persistent leaves. It was first described by Nicolás Rojas Acosta in 1897.

== Description ==
Pereskia nemorosa grows as a small tree or a shrub, reaching 3–5 m (10–16 ft) high, with trunks to 10 cm (4 in) in diameter. Mature stems develop bark and, unlike other species of Pereskia, do not have stomata. Like all species of Pereskia and unlike most other cacti, P. nemorosa has persistent leaves, the largest being up to 14 cm (5.5 in) long and 6 cm (2.4 in) wide. The leaves are succulent and have short petioles, only 5 mm (0.2 in) long, and are borne on the areoles along with spines. The areoles on the twigs have up to five spines, those on the trunks up to 20 or more, each 4–6 cm (1.6–2.4 in) long. The white to pale pink flowers are either solitary or borne in small terminal inflorescences of two to five, and are 4–7 cm (1.6–2.8 in) across. The fruits are pear-shaped, green or yellowish-green when ripe.

== Taxonomy ==
The species was first described by Nicolás Rojas Acosta in 1897. Molecular phylogenetic studies suggested that when broadly circumscribed, Pereskia was not monophyletic, and consisted of three clades. In 2016, the genus Rhodocactus was revived for one of these clades, which included R. nemorosus. In 2025, a major study of the phylogenomics and classification of cacti by De Vos et al. did not recognize Rhodocactus, based on sparse taxon sampling. As of April 2026, Plants of the World Online agreed, accepting Rhodocactus nemorosus as a synonym of Pereskia nemorosa.

== Distribution and habitat ==
Pereskia nemorosa is native to southern Brazil, Paraguay, Uruguay and northeast Argentina. It is found in drier wooded habitats.
