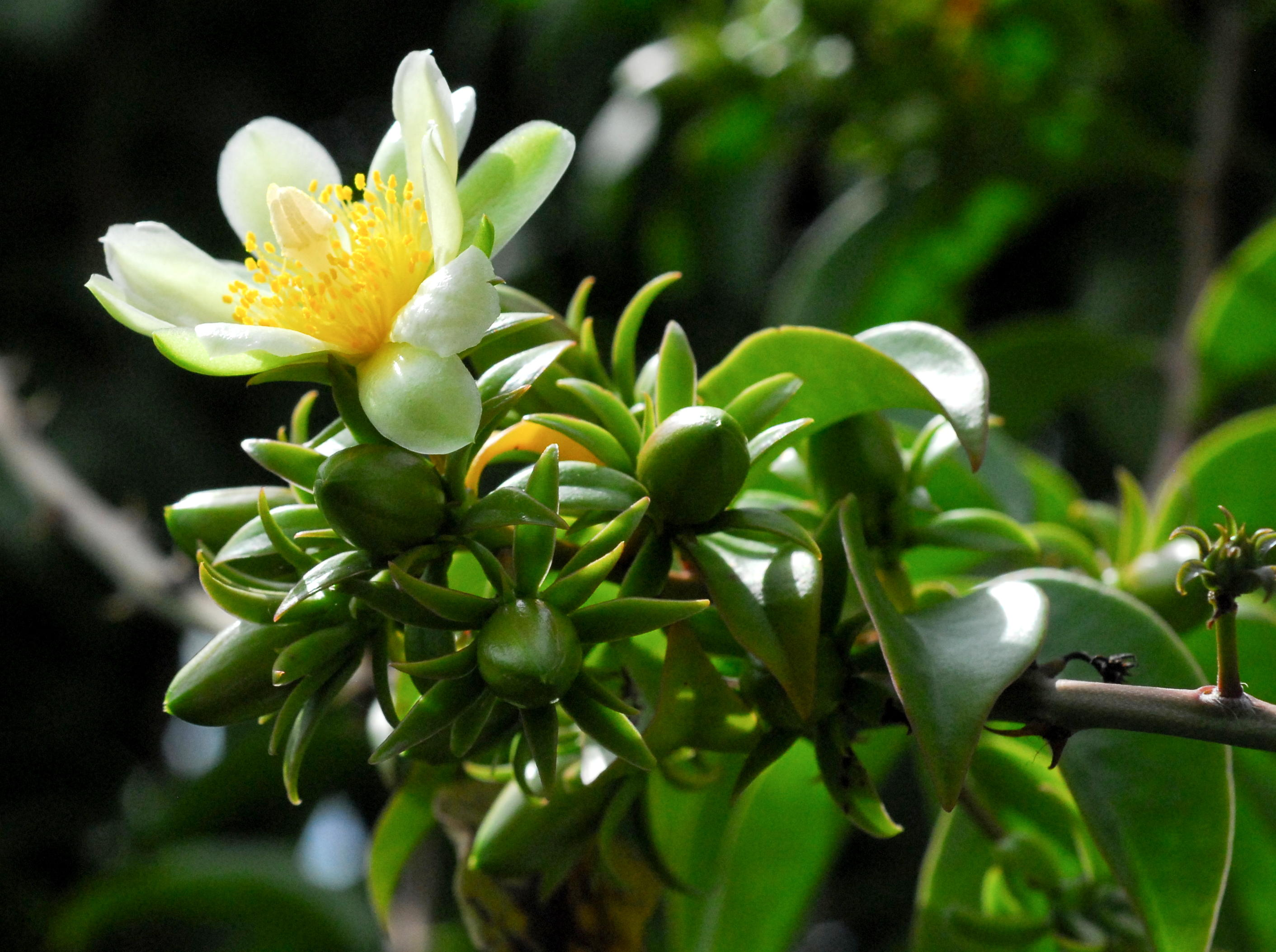

Conservation status
- Least Concern (IUCN 3.1)

Scientific classification
- Kingdom: Plantae
- Clade: Tracheophytes
- Clade: Angiosperms
- Clade: Eudicots
- Order: Caryophyllales
- Family: Cactaceae
- Genus: Pereskia
- Species: P. aculeata

Binomial name
- Pereskia aculeata Mill.

Synonyms
- Cactus lucidus Salisb.; Cactus pereskia L.; Pereskia foetens Speg. in Weingart; Pereskia fragrans Lem.; Pereskia godseffiana hort.; Pereskia longispina Haw.; Pereskia pereskia (L.) H.Karst. nom. inval.; Pereskia rubescens Houghton; Pereskia undulata Lem.

= Pereskia aculeata =

Species of cactus

Pereskia aculeata is a scrambling shrub in the family Cactaceae. Common names include Barbados gooseberry, blade-apple cactus, leaf cactus, rose cactus, and lemonvine. It is native to tropical America. The leaves and fruits are edible, containing high quantities of protein, iron and other nutrients, and it is a popular vegetable in parts of the Brazilian state of Minas Gerais under the name of ora-pro-nóbis.

== Description ==
Like other members of the genus Pereskia, these plants are unusual cacti with spiny non-succulent stems and large leaves.

It is a scrambling vine growing to 10 m (33 ft) tall in trees, with stems 2–3 cm (0.79–1.18 in) thick. Younger stems have hooked thorns and older stems have clusters of woody spines. The leaves are 4–11 cm (1.6–4.3 in) long and 1.5–4 cm (0.59–1.57 in) broad, simple, entire, and deciduous in the dry season. The strongly scented flowers are white, cream or pinkish, 2.5–5 cm (0.98–1.97 in) diameter, and numerous, produced in panicles. The fruit is a rounded berry, translucent white to light yellow, orange, or red, and 1.5–2 cm (0.59–0.79 in) in diameter. The leaves are edible, containing 20 to 30% of protein in the dry leaf matter. The fruits are also edible, containing numerous small seeds. It somewhat resembles the gooseberry in appearance and is of excellent flavor.

== Distribution ==
=== Native ===
South America, including French Guiana, Guyana, Suriname, Venezuela, Brazil, Colombia, Argentina and Paraguay.

=== Introduced ===
Considered naturalized in the United States, Mexico, Central America, and the Caribbean. Also introduced to China, India, South Africa, Vietnam, Hawaii, Palau, French Polynesia, and Australia.

== Ecological significance ==
A flea-beetle (Phenrica guerini), a leaf-mining moth (Epipagis cambogialis), and a stem-wilter, (Catorhintha schaffneri), feed on the leaves.

Although Pereskia aculeata is edible and of high nutrition quality, being an alternative to conventional food, this plant is a declared weed in South Africa where it does extensive damage to forest areas by smothering indigenous trees. Infestations occur in some KwaZulu-Natal forests and are embedded in the canopy and difficult to remove. The plant has a tendency to form large, impenetrable clumps and the spines on the stems make control of large infestations difficult. The plants can regrow from leaves or pieces of stem. One specimen that had infested a tree had its stems cut at the base, but after four years the 'dry' stems of the Pereskia that fell from the tree still set root and regrew.

== Control ==
These plants are extremely difficult to kill and eradicate. It can be controlled by triclopyr, or through biological control with the flea-beetle Phenrica guerini. The flea-beetle has caused significant damage to Pereskia plants at Port Alfred, Eastern Cape, South Africa, and was also released widely in KwaZulu-Natal, but has not become established there.

== Gallery ==
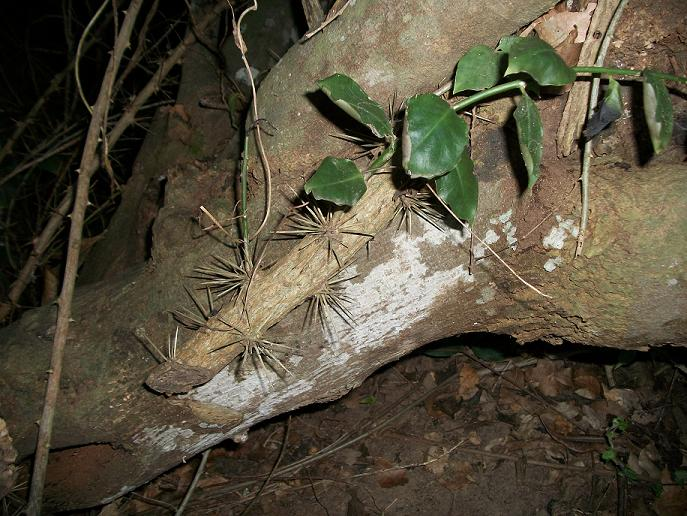
An old cut stem showing regrowth despite not being in contact with the ground

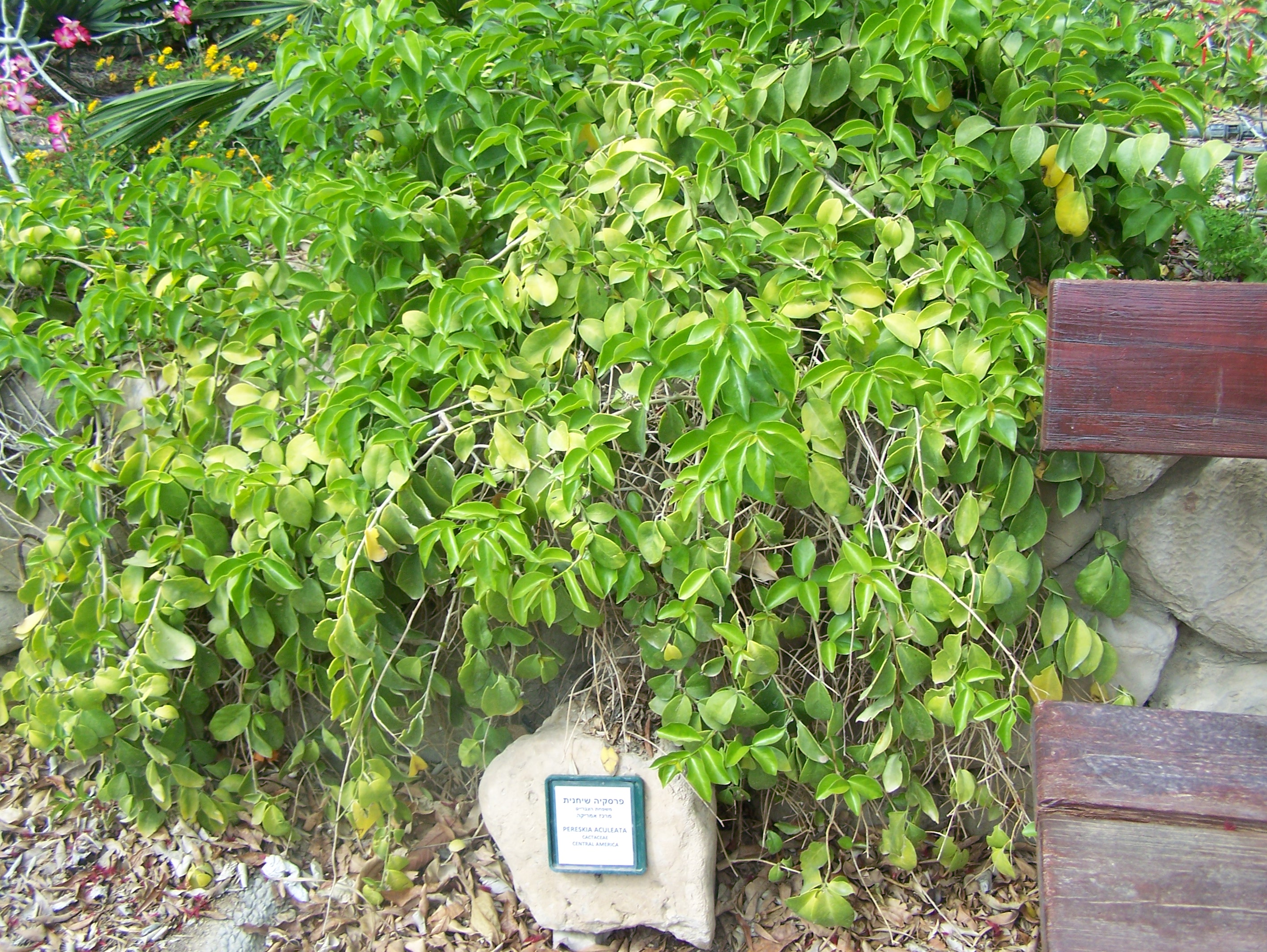
Growing in Ein Gedi Botanical Gardens

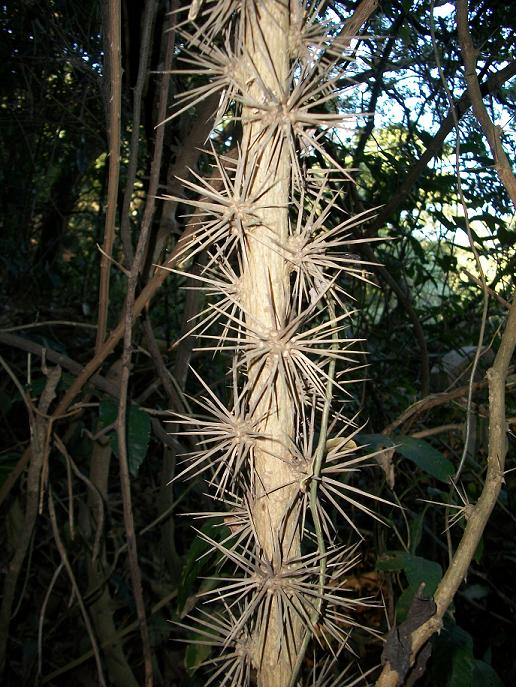
Mature stem at Ilanda Wilds

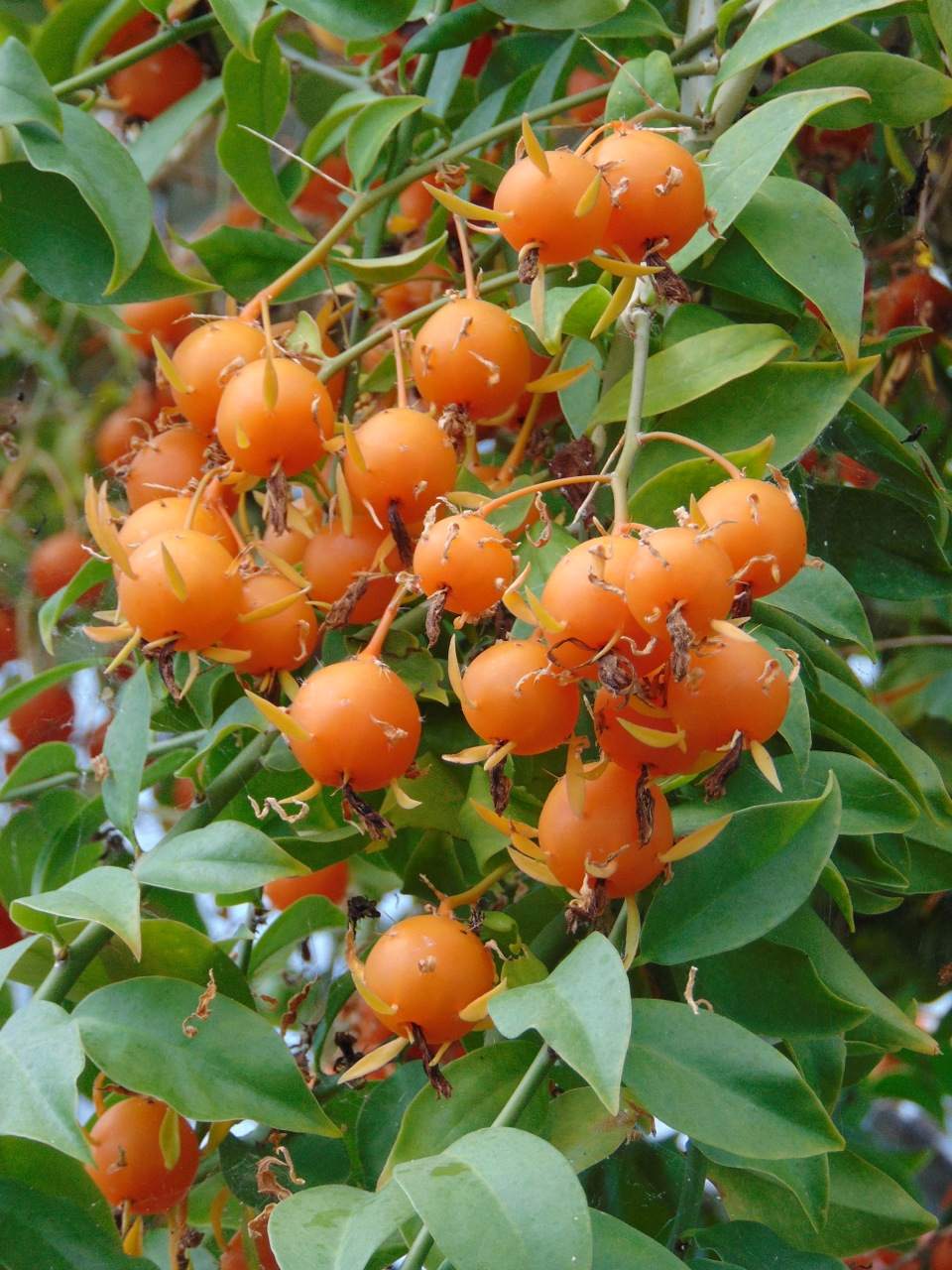
Centennial Park Conservatory, Toronto
