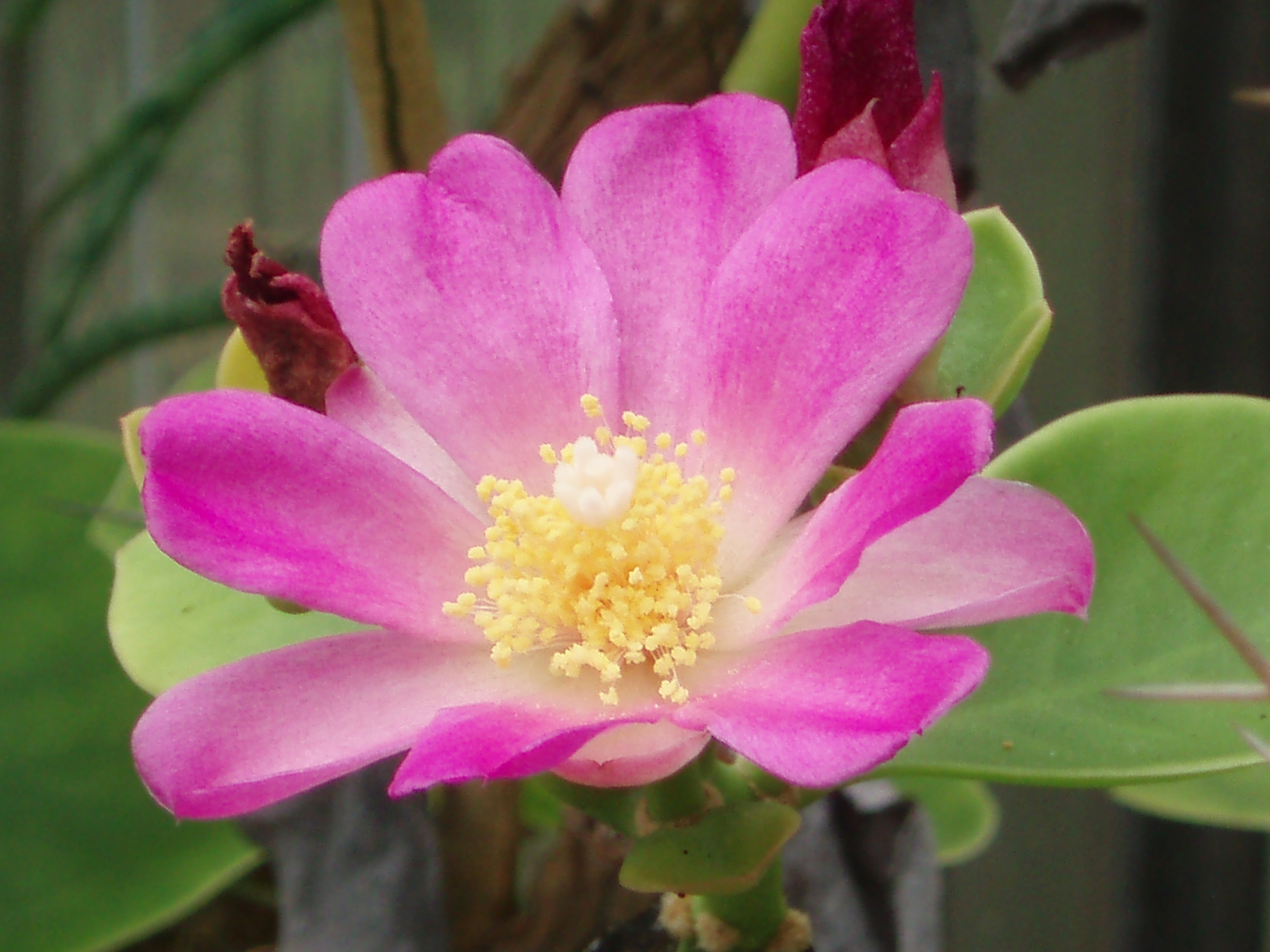

Conservation status
- Least Concern (IUCN 3.1)

Scientific classification
- Kingdom: Plantae
- Clade: Tracheophytes
- Clade: Angiosperms
- Clade: Eudicots
- Order: Caryophyllales
- Family: Cactaceae
- Genus: Pereskia
- Species: P. bahiensis

Binomial name
- Pereskia bahiensis Gürke

Synonyms
- Rhodocactus bahiensis (Gürke) I.Asai & K.Miyata

= Pereskia bahiensis =

Species of cactus

Pereskia bahiensis is a species of tree-like cactus that is endemic to the Brazilian state of Bahia. It was transferred to Rhodocactus in 2016 as Rhodocactus bahiensis, but this placement was not accepted by Plants of the World Online as of April 2026. Like all species in the genus Pereskia, and unlike most cacti, it has persistent leaves. In its native locality, it is used to form hedges.

== Description ==
Pereskia bahiensis grows as a small tree or a shrub, reaching 1–6 m (3–20 ft) high, with trunks to 30 cm (12 in) in diameter. The young twigs are green or reddish, and have a few stomata, mainly around the areoles. Mature stems develop grayish-brown bark. Like all species of Pereskia and unlike most other cacti, P. bahiensis has persistent leaves, the largest being up to 12 cm (4.7 in) long and 7 cm (2.8 in) wide. The leaves are succulent and have very short petioles, only 1–2 mm (0.0–0.1 in) long. The areoles bear leaves (brachyblast leaves) along with spines. The areoles on the twigs have up to six spines, those on the trunks may have about 45, each 2–6.5 cm (0.8–2.6 in) or exceptionally 9 cm (3.5 in) long. The pink to reddish-purple flowers are either solitary or borne in small terminal inflorescences of 2–12, and are 4–7 cm (1.6–2.8 in) across. The fruits are more-or-less pear-shaped, 3–6 cm (1.2–2.4 in) long, containing many glossy black seeds.

In its native habitat, P. bahiensis flowers in the spring and summer, from October to April, and fruits in the autumn from March to June. It then loses its leaves in the winter dry season from about June to October.

== Taxonomy ==
The species was first described by R. L. M. Gürke in 1897 as Pereskia bahiensis. Molecular phylogenetic studies suggested that when broadly circumscribed, Pereskia was not monophyletic, and consisted of three clades. In 2016, the genus Rhodocactus was revived for one of these clades, which included R. bahiensis. In 2025, a major study of the phylogenomics and classification of cacti by De Vos et al. did not recognize Rhodocactus, based on sparse taxon sampling, and as of April 2026, Plants of the World Online treated the species as Pereskia bahiensis.

== Distribution and habitat ==
Pereskia bahiensis is endemic to the Brazilian state of Bahia, where it is found in caatinga, subtropical dry shrubland.

== Conservation ==
Pereskia bahiensis has been assessed as Least Concern, with no major threats. It regenerates well after disturbance.

== Uses ==
Pereskia bahiensis is used locally for hedges. Cuttings are planted densely to form an impenetrable hedge, which is cut regularly.
