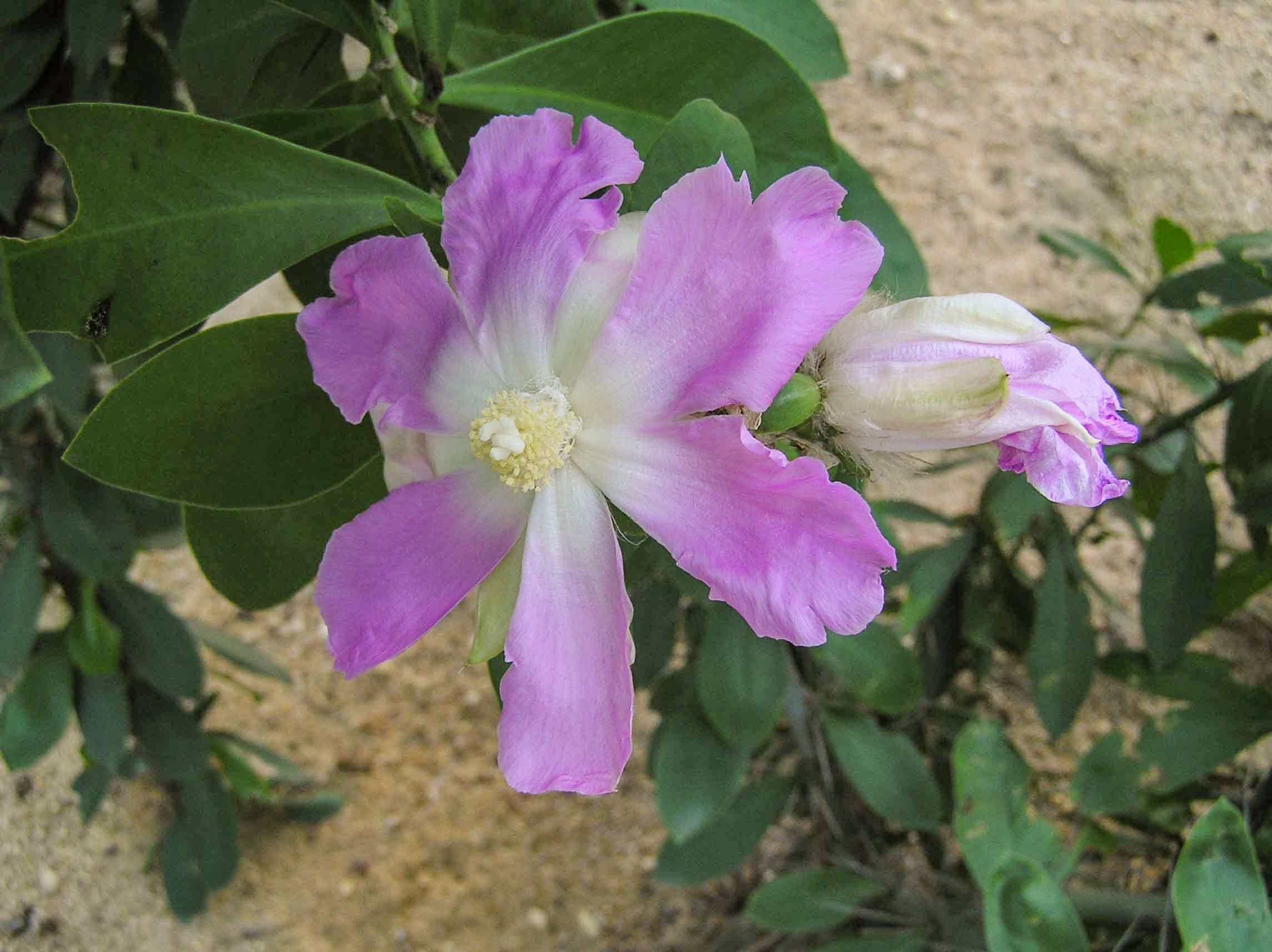
- In cultivation in Fairy Lake Botanical Garden, China

Conservation status
- Least Concern (IUCN 3.1)

Scientific classification
- Kingdom: Plantae
- Clade: Tracheophytes
- Clade: Angiosperms
- Clade: Eudicots
- Order: Caryophyllales
- Family: Cactaceae
- Genus: Pereskia
- Species: P. sacharosa

Binomial name
- Pereskia sacharosa Griseb.

Synonyms
- Pereskia moorei Britton & Rose; Pereskia saipinensis Cárdenas; Pereskia sparsiflora F.Ritter; Rhodocactus sacharosa (Griseb.) Backeb.; Rhodocactus saipinensis (Cárdenas) Backeb.

= Pereskia sacharosa =

Species of cactus

Pereskia sacharosa, synonym Rhodocactus sacharosa, is a species of flowering plant in the cactus family Cactaceae, native from Bolivia and west-central Brazil to Paraguay and northern Argentina. Like all species in the genus Pereskia and unlike most cacti, it has persistent leaves. It was first described in 1879.

== Description ==
Pereskia sacharosa grows as a small tree or a shrub, reaching 5–7 m (16–23 ft) high. Mature stems develop bark and, like most other species of Pereskia, have stomata. Like all species of Pereskia and unlike most other cacti, P. sacharosa has persistent leaves. These are very variable in shape and size, 3–12 cm (1.2–4.7 in) long and 2–7 cm (0.8–2.8 in) wide, often folded along the midrib, which is very prominent on the underside, and with obvious petioles. The areoles on the twigs have up to five strong spines, 1–4 cm (0.4–1.6 in) long, those on the trunks may have up to 25 spines, 3–3 cm (1.2–1.2 in) long. The flowers are various shades of pink and are either solitary or borne in small terminal inflorescences of two to four, each flower being 3–7 cm (1.2–2.8 in) across. The fleshy fruits are more or less globe-shaped or pear-shaped, 4–5 cm (1.6–2.0 in) long and wide, green or yellowish when ripe. The flower has an inferior ovary which is buried in the stem so that the fruit bears areoles from which other flowers can develop, forming a chain like that of Opuntia fulgida.

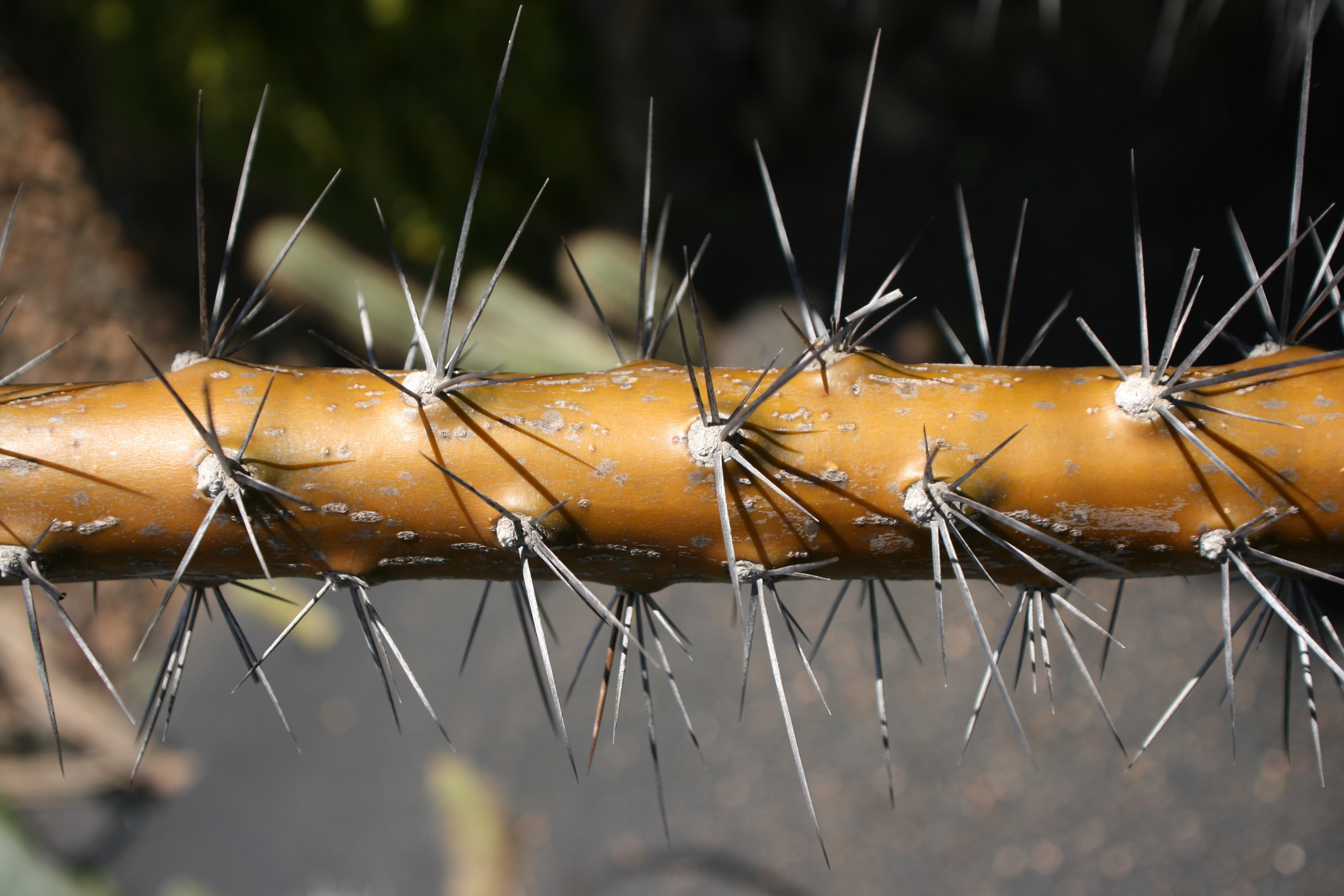
Spines on a leafless stem

== Taxonomy ==
The species was first described by August Grisebach in 1879. The specific epithet sacharosa is a noun in apposition, derived from a vernacular name. One explanation is that it is derived from the Quecha word sacha, meaning 'tree' or 'woods', hence 'tree rose' or 'woods rose'. In 1966, Curt Backeberg transferred the species to the genus Rhodocactus. At that time, this was not accepted by most botanists, and Rhodocactus was sunk into a broadly circumscribed Pereskia. Molecular phylogenetic studies from 2005 onwards suggested that with this circumscription, Pereskia was not monophyletic, and consisted of three clades. In 2016, the genus Rhodocactus was revived for one of these clades, which included R. sacharosa. In 2025, a major study of the phylogenomics and classification of cacti by De Vos et al. did not recognize Rhodocactus, based on sparse taxon sampling. As of April 2026, Plants of the World Online agreed, accepting Rhodocactus sacharosa as a synonym of Pereskia sacharosa.

== Distribution and habitat ==
Pereskia sacharosa is native to Bolivia and west-central Brazil southwards to Paraguay and northern Argentina. It occurs at elevations of 1,000–2,500 m (3,300–8,200 ft) in the foothills of the Andes and the semiarid Gran Chaco region.
