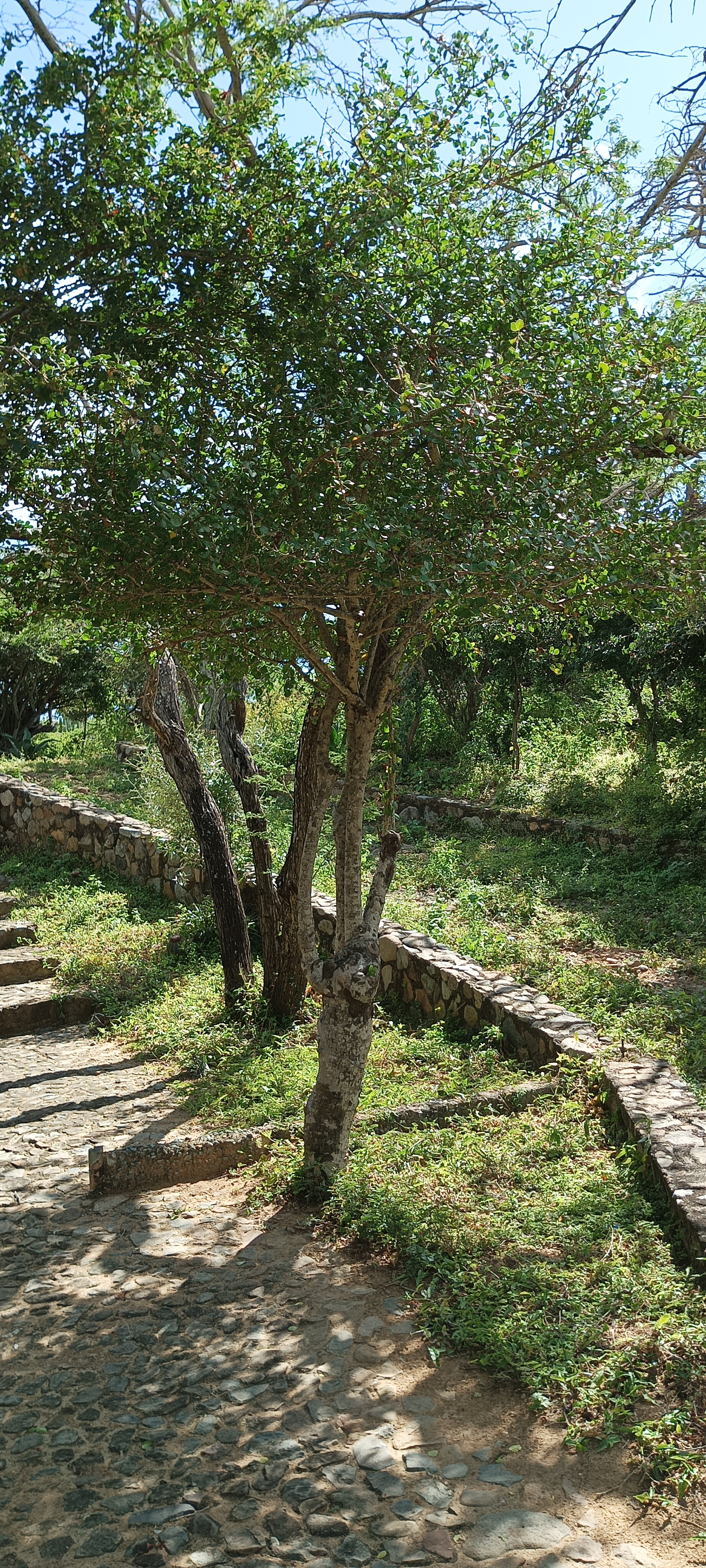

Conservation status
- Least Concern (IUCN 3.1)

Scientific classification
- Kingdom: Plantae
- Clade: Tracheophytes
- Clade: Angiosperms
- Clade: Eudicots
- Order: Caryophyllales
- Family: Cactaceae
- Genus: Leuenbergeria
- Species: L. guamacho

Binomial name
- Leuenbergeria guamacho F.A.C.Weber

= Leuenbergeria guamacho =

Species of cactus in Central America

Leuenbergeria guamacho, the guamacho, is a species of plant that belongs to the cactus family and is one of the few cacti with spines that bears a strong resemblance to deciduous trees.

== Description ==
The tree is slow-growing, up to 8 m (26 ft) tall, with a brown trunk, a rounded crown up to 3 m (9.8 ft) in diameter, with simple alternate leaves. Its flowers are bright yellow. The fruit is edible, round, and yellow-green when ripe, filled with numerous black seeds.

== Range ==
Originating in the American tropics from Mexico to northern South America, it can be found in great numbers in the mountains near the Venezuelan coast. It is found in drier regions and most notably in the national parks of Venezuela.

== Taxonomy ==
Leuenbergeria guamacho was first described as Pereskia guamacho by Frédéric Albert Constantin Weber and first recorded in the Dictionnaire d'Horticulture 2: 938–939. 1898. It has also been formerly classified as Rodocactus guamacho, Pereskia colombiana, Rhodocactus colombianus, and Rhodocactus guamacho.

== Bibliography ==
1. Correa A., M. D., C. Galdames & M. N. S. Stapf. 2004. Cat. Pl. Vasc. Panamá 1–599. Smithsonian Tropical Research Institute, Panama.
2. Funk, V. A., P. E. Berry, S. Alexander, T. H. Hollowell & C. L. Kelloff. 2007. Checklist of the Plants of the Guiana Shield (Venezuela: Amazonas, Bolivar, Delta Amacuro; Guyana, Surinam, French Guiana). Contr. U.S. Natl. Herb. 55: 1–584.
3. Hokche, O., P. E. Berry & O. Huber. 2008. Nuev. Cat. Fl. Vas. Venezuela 1–860. Fundación Instituto Botánico de Venezuela, Caracas, Venezuela.
4. Leuenberger, B. E. 1986. Pereskia (Cactaceae). Mem. New York Bot. Gard. 41: 1–141.
5. Steyermark, J. 1995. Flora of the Venezuelan Guayana Project.
