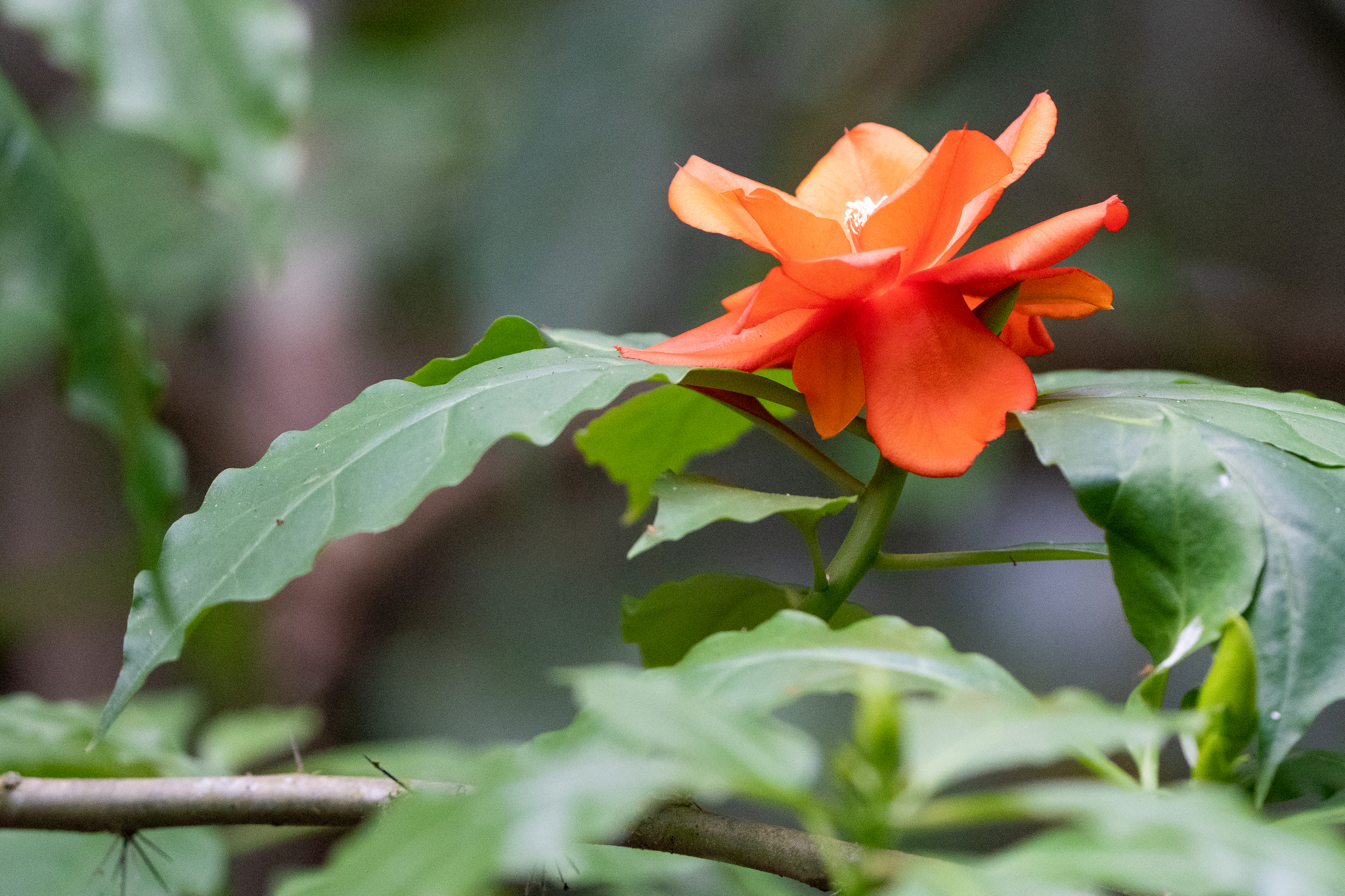
- Leuenbergeria bleo in Soberanía National Park, Panama

Conservation status
- Least Concern (IUCN 3.1)

Scientific classification
- Kingdom: Plantae
- Clade: Tracheophytes
- Clade: Angiosperms
- Clade: Eudicots
- Order: Caryophyllales
- Family: Cactaceae
- Genus: Leuenbergeria
- Species: L. bleo

Binomial name
- Leuenbergeria bleo (Kunth) Lodé

Synonyms
- Cactus bleo Kunth; Pereskia bleo (Kunth) DC.; Pereskia corrugata Cutak; Pereskia cruenta Pfeiff.; Pereskia panamensis F.A.C.Weber; Rhodocactus bleo (Kunth) F.M.Knuth; Rhodocactus corrugatus (Cutak) Backeb.

= Leuenbergeria bleo =

Species of cactus

Leuenbergeria bleo, formerly Pereskia bleo, (rose cactus, leaf cactus) is a leafy cactus, native to the shady, moist forests of Central America, that grows to a woody, prickly shrub about 2 m tall with large, orange flowers resembling rose blossoms.

== Description ==
Leuenbergeria bleo grows as a shrub or small tree and reaches a height of 2 to 8 metres with trunks up to 15 centimetres in diameter. The olive-green to brownish grey branches are smooth. The leaves are arranged alternately on the branches and are distinctly stalked with petioles up to 3 centimetres long. The leaf blade is 6 to 20 centimetres long and 2 to 7 centimetres wide, elliptic to oblong or lanceolate in shape. The five nerved leaf blades have four to six, often fork-shaped, side lobes. The thorns are either parallel in bundles or spread widely out. Long thorns on the branches are up to five to ten millimetres long. Along the main shoots there are up to 40 spines per areole, each 2 centimetres long.

The flowers are arranged in terminal lateral inflorescences. The bare, bright red, scarlet, salmon pink and orange-red-pink flowers reach diameters of 4 to 6 centimeters.

The fruits are conical, truncated in the apex, ripening yellow. They are edible but sour tasting. They contain lenticular seeds with a relatively large surface area of 39.61 mm². The seeds are 7.81 mm long and 6.45 mm wide.

== Taxonomy ==
The first description of the species, as Cactus bleo, was in 1828 by Karl Sigismund Kunth.

== Distribution and habitat ==
Leuenbergeria bleo is found by rivers and streams in Panama and Colombia as well as in secondary forest, from sea level to altitudes of 1300 metres.

The Red List of Threatened Species of the IUCN lists the species as "Least Concern (LC)" or not at risk.

== Gallery ==
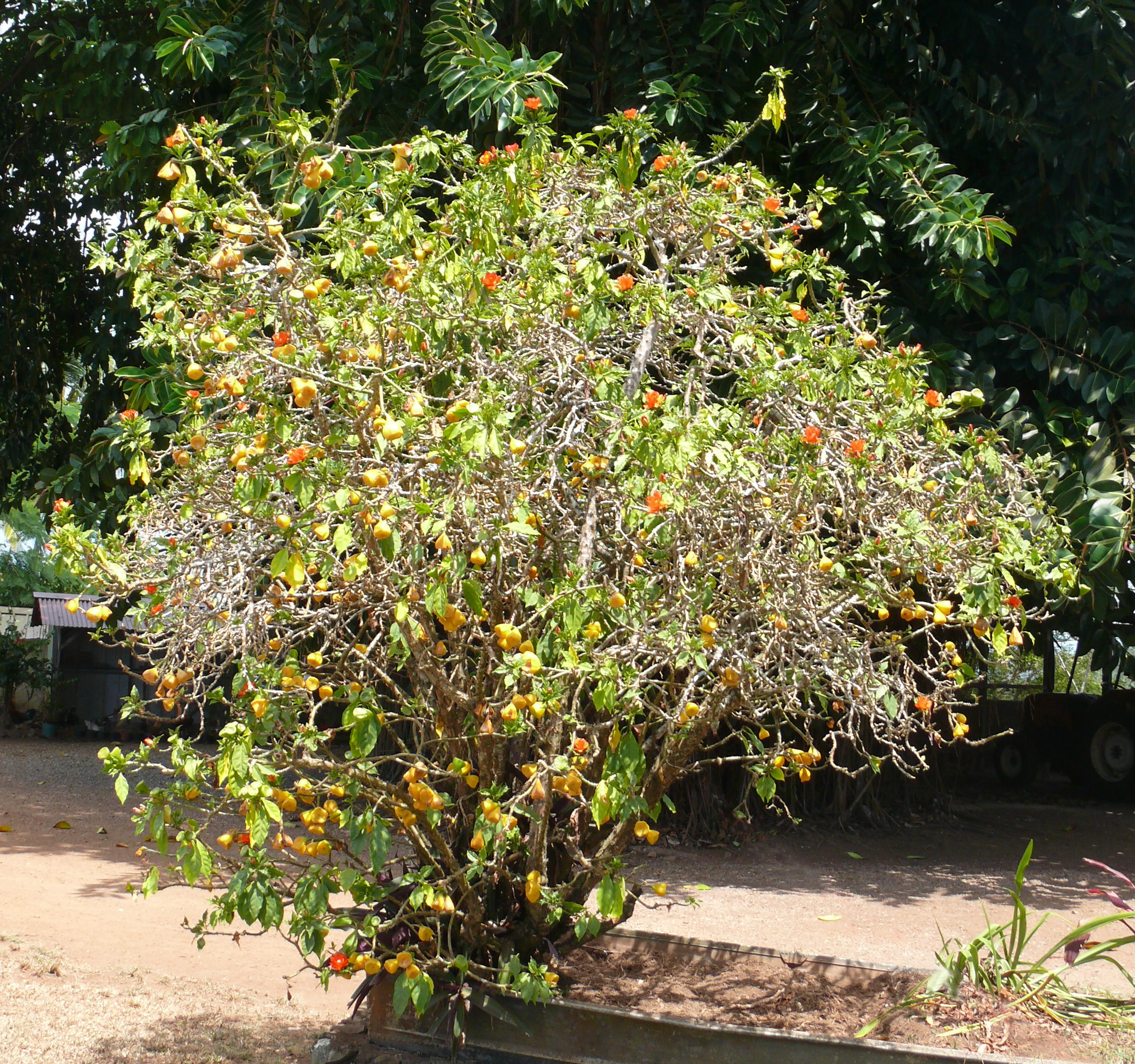

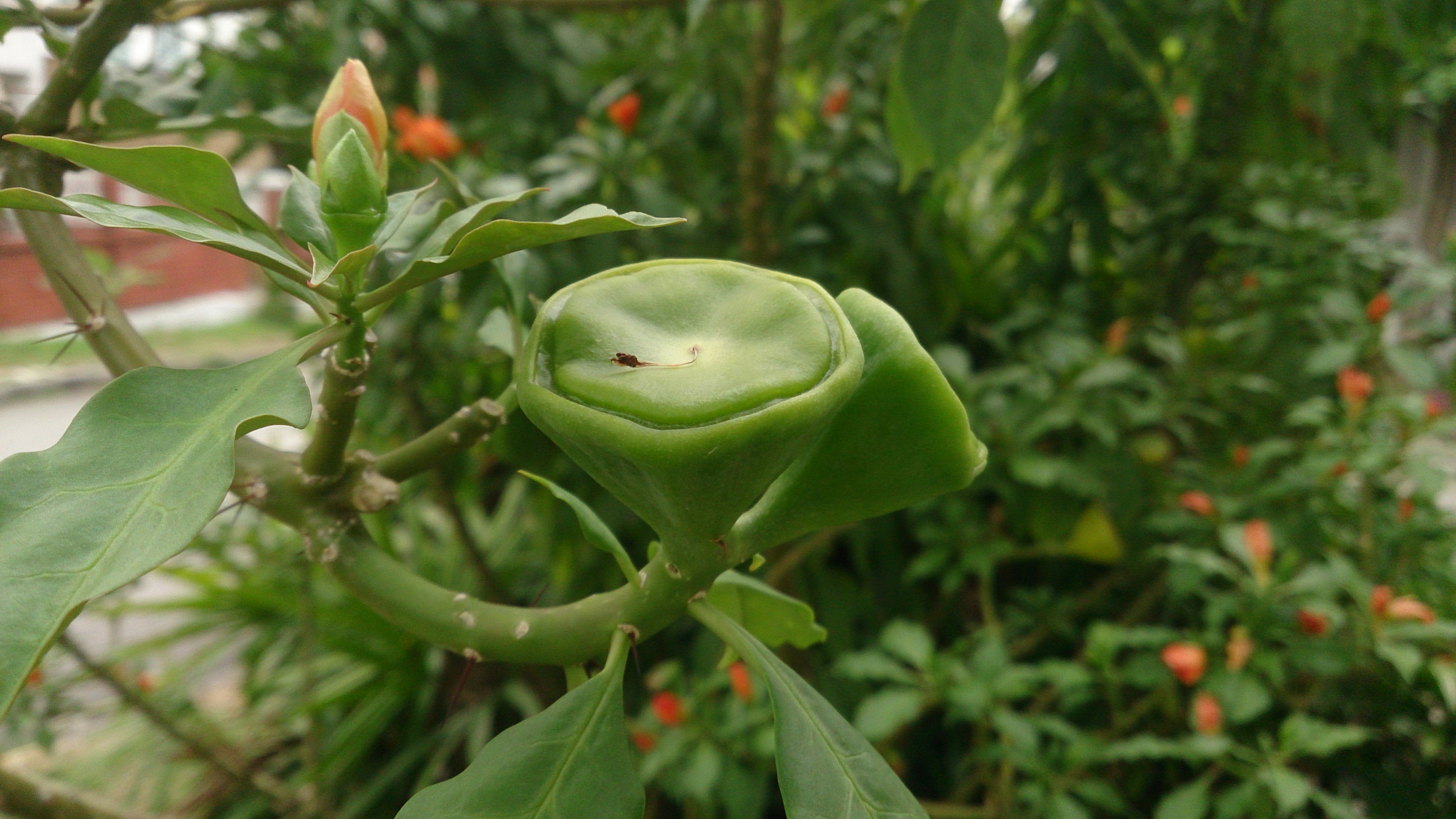

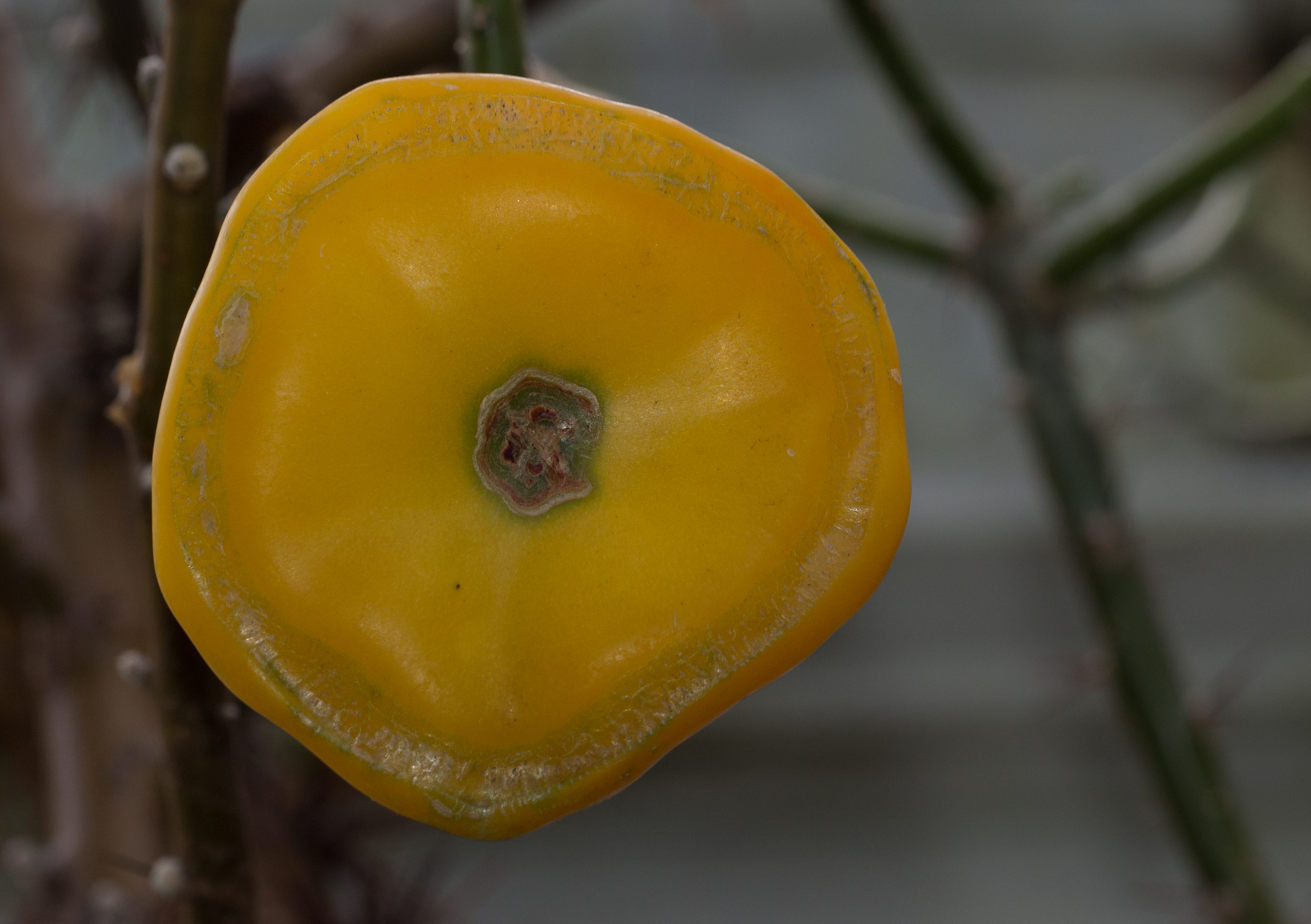
Fruit

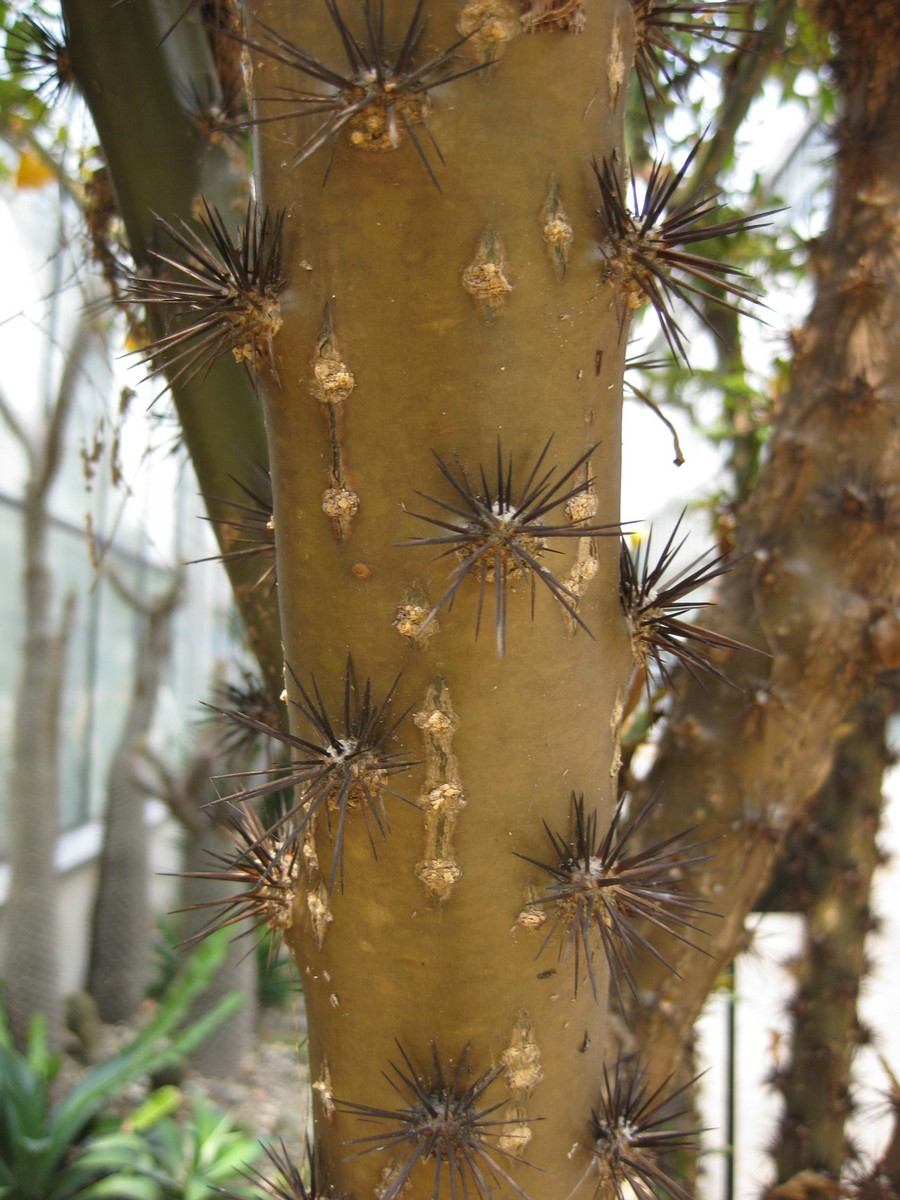

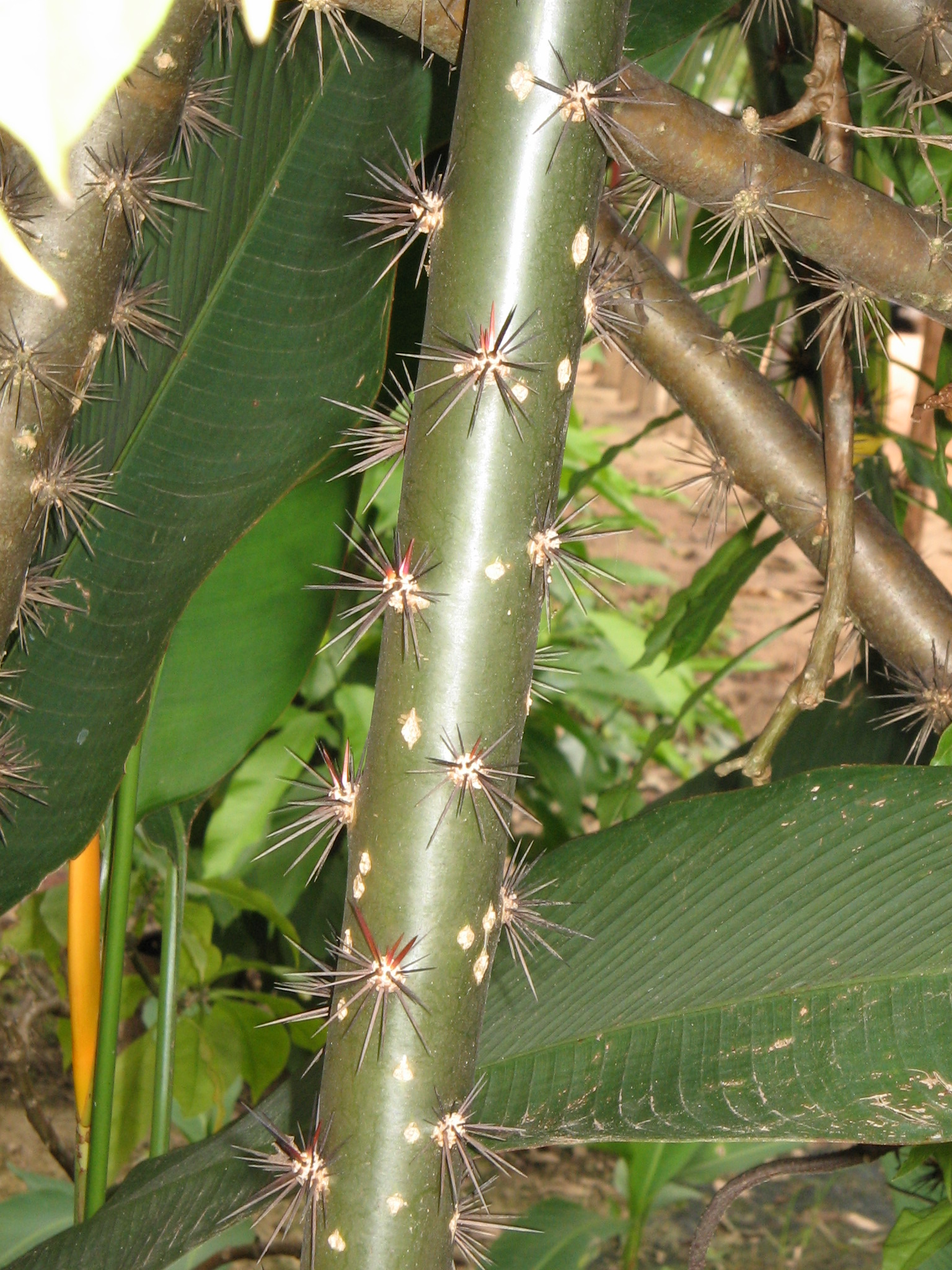

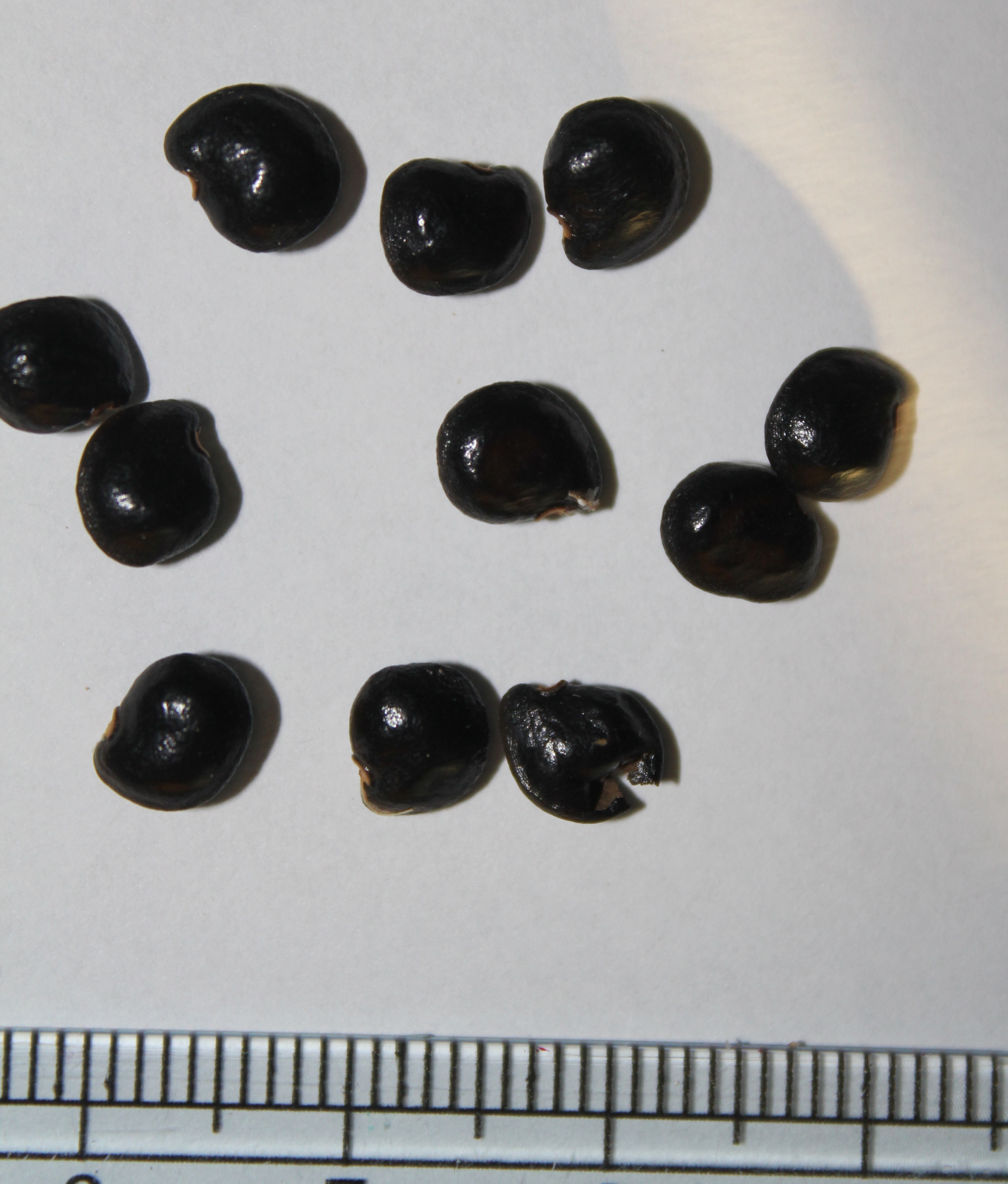
Seeds

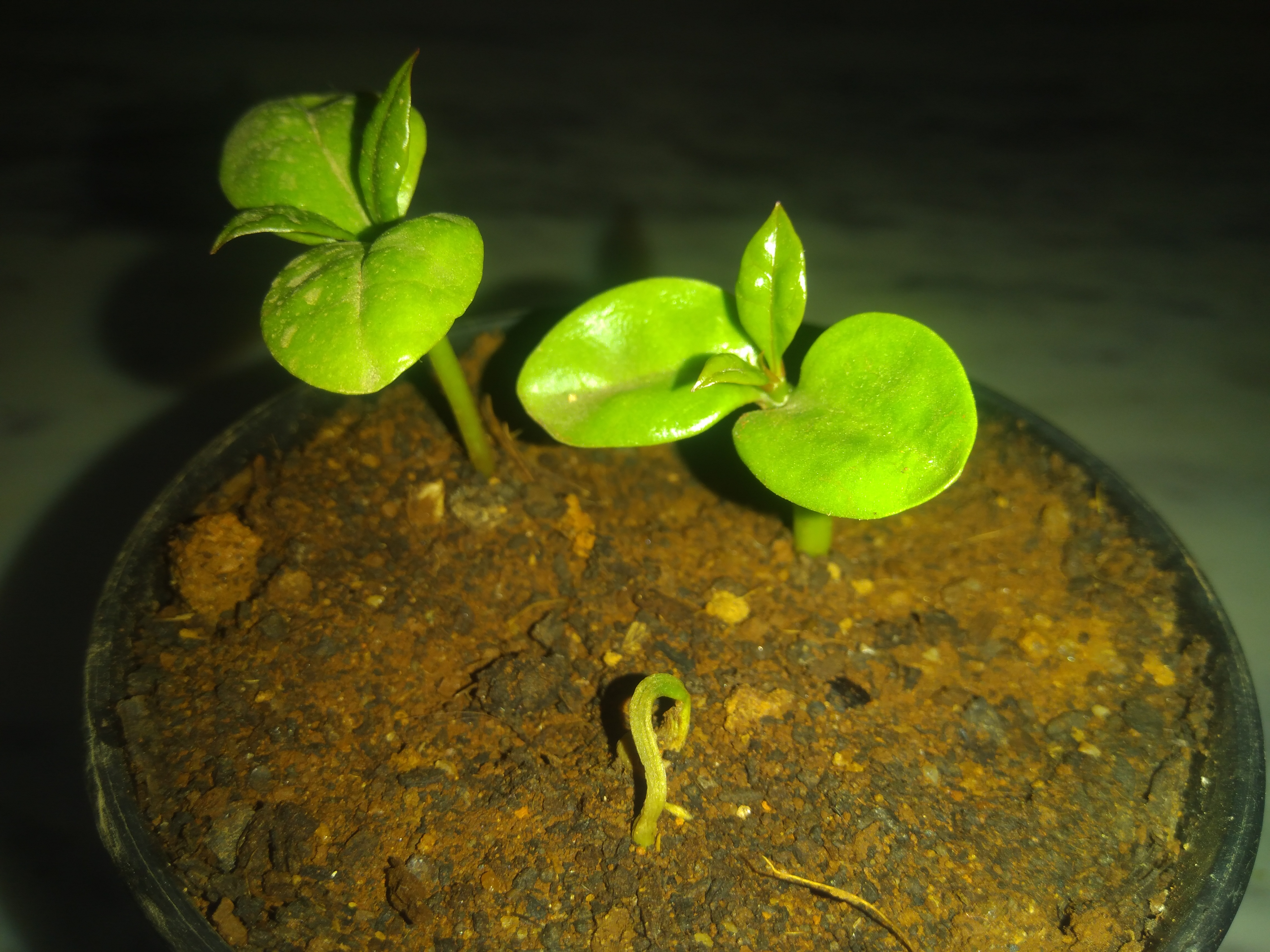
Seedlings

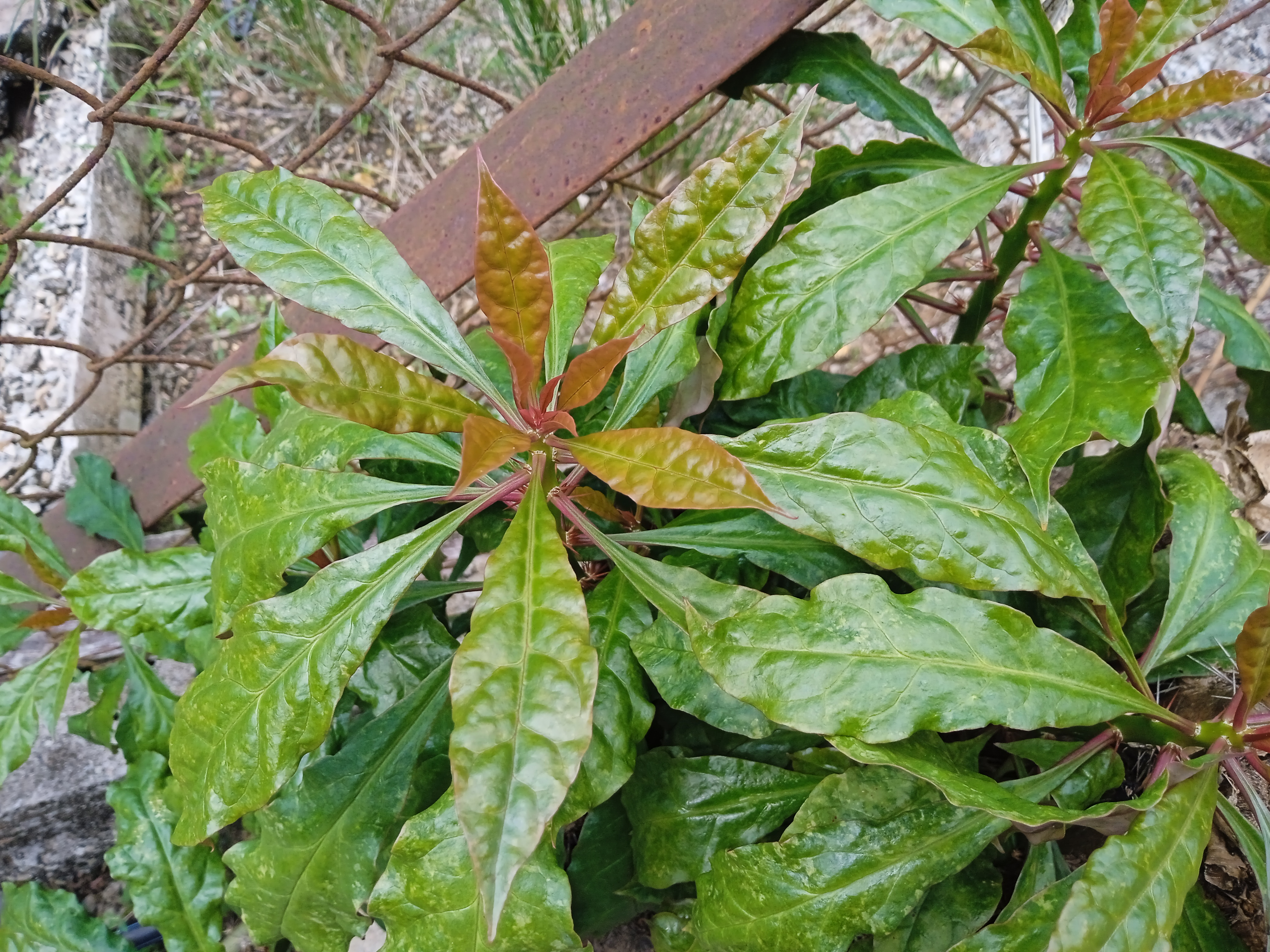
Leaves
