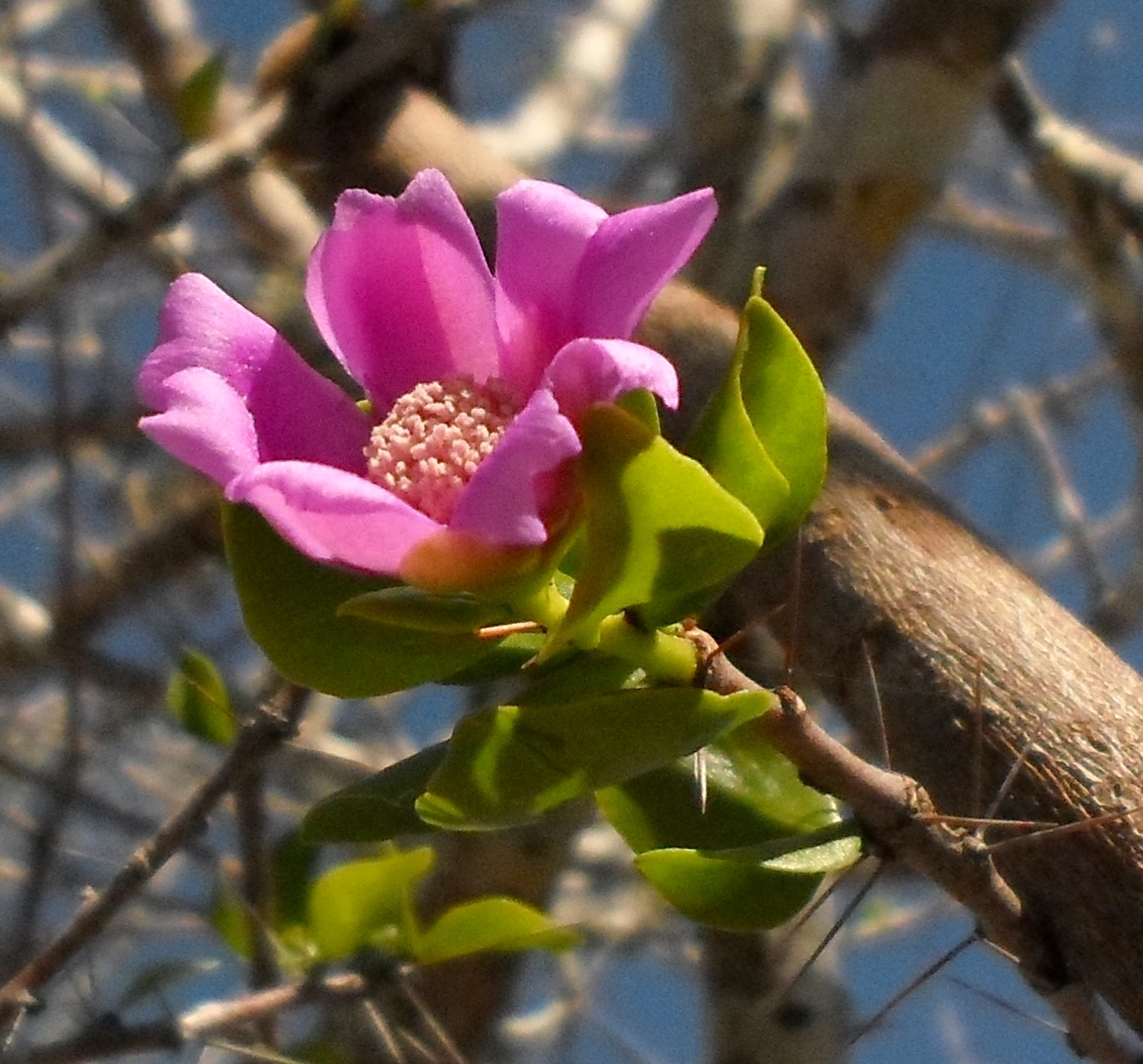
- Leuenbergeria zinniiflora

Conservation status
- Vulnerable (IUCN 3.1)

Scientific classification
- Kingdom: Plantae
- Clade: Tracheophytes
- Clade: Angiosperms
- Clade: Eudicots
- Order: Caryophyllales
- Family: Cactaceae
- Genus: Leuenbergeria
- Species: L. zinniiflora

Binomial name
- Leuenbergeria zinniiflora (DC.) Lodé

Synonyms
- Pereskia zinniiflora DC.; Rhodocactus zinniiflorus (DC.) F.M.Knuth; Cactus zinniiflorus Moc. & Sessé ex DC.; Pereskia cubensis Britton & Rose; Rhodocactus cubensis (Britton & Rose) F.M.Knuth

= Leuenbergeria zinniiflora =

Species of cactus

Leuenbergeria zinniiflora, formerly Pereskia zinniiflora, is a leafy cactus, native to the seasonally dry tropical forests of Cuba.

== Distribution and habitat ==
Leuenbergeria zinniiflora is found in Cuba predominantly in the seasonally dry tropical biome.

== Gallery ==
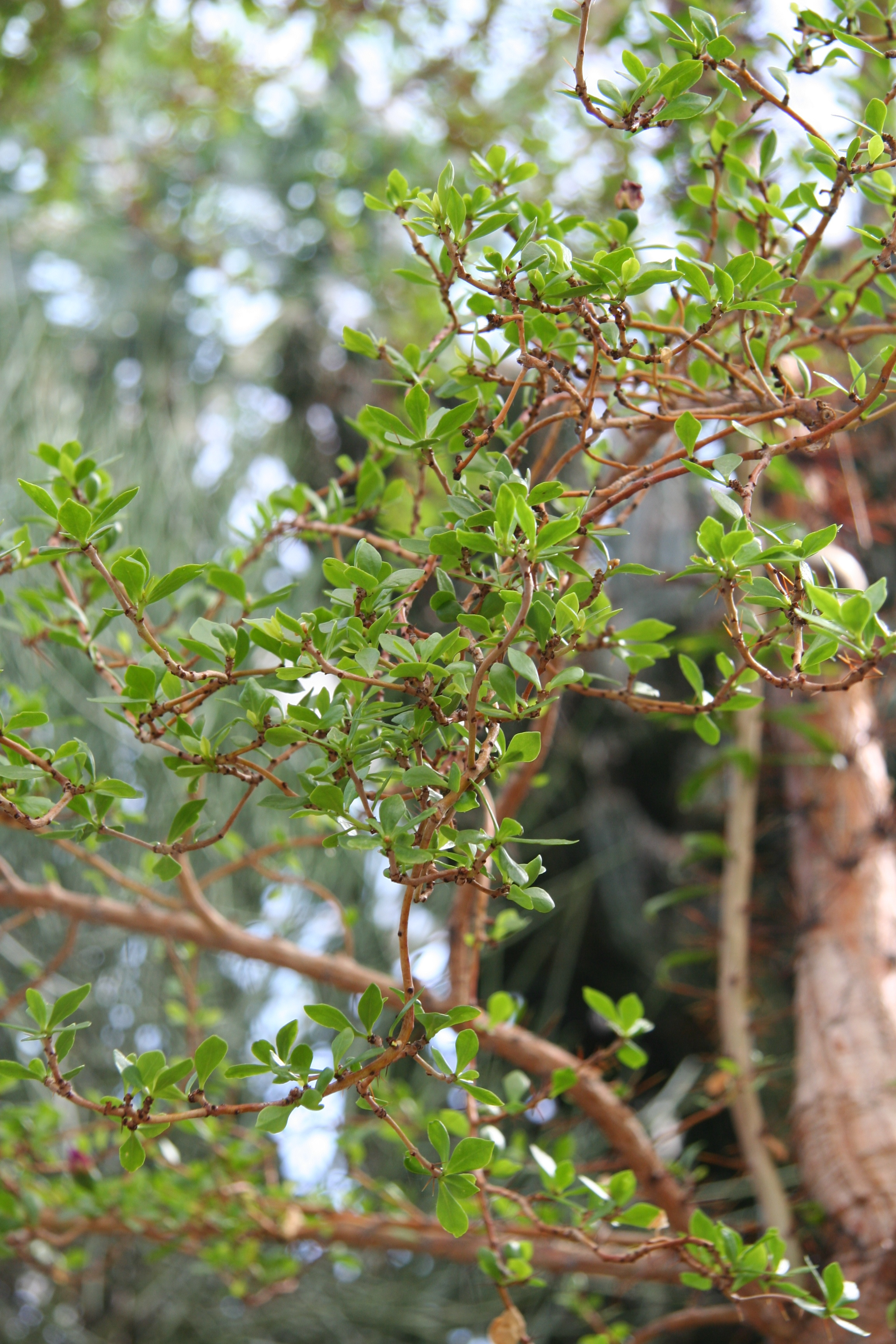

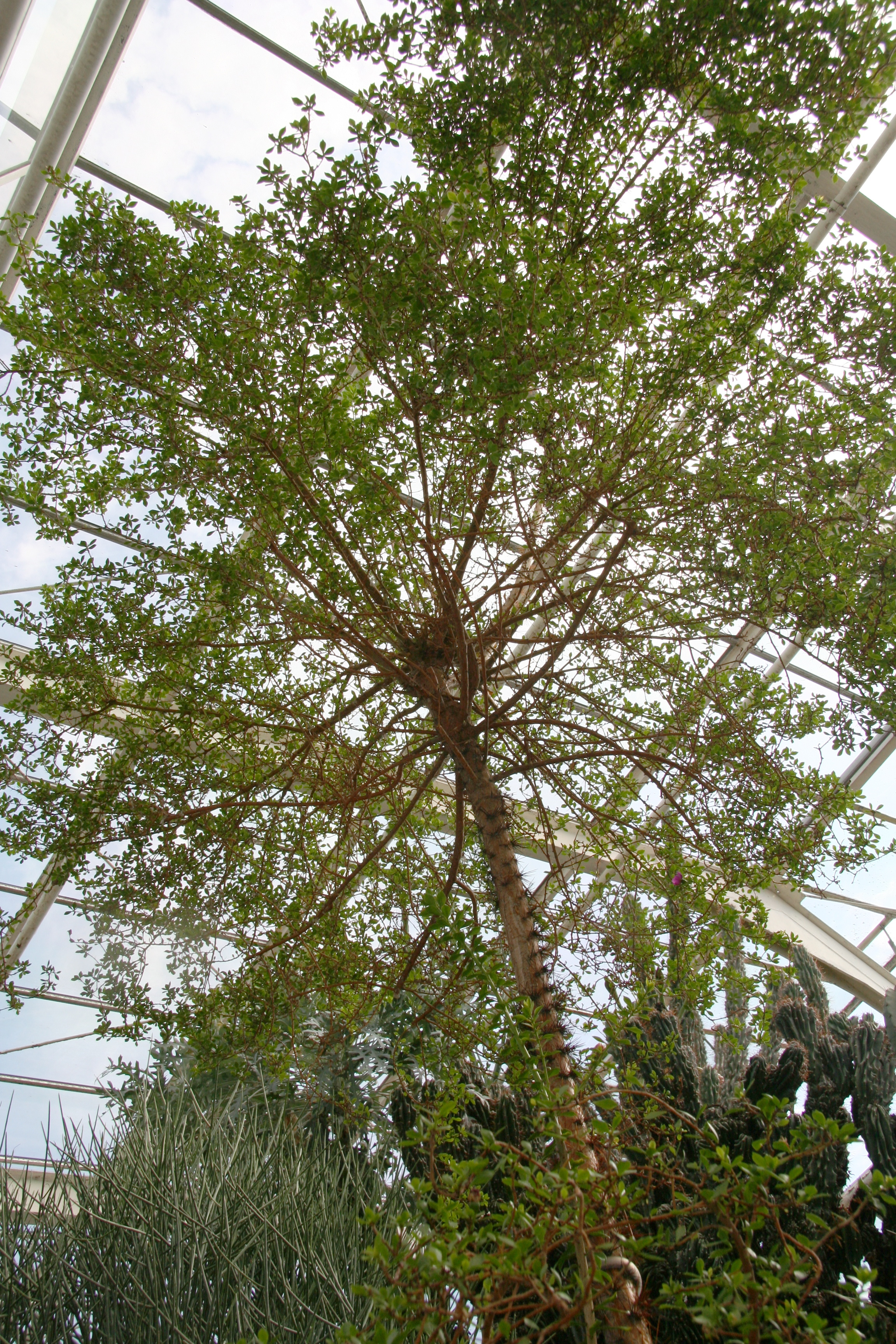
