= Leuenbergeria lychnidiflora =

Conservation status
- Least Concern (IUCN 3.1)

Scientific classification
- Kingdom: Plantae
- Clade: Tracheophytes
- Clade: Angiosperms
- Clade: Eudicots
- Order: Caryophyllales
- Family: Cactaceae
- Genus: Leuenbergeria
- Species: L. lychnidiflora

Binomial name
- Leuenbergeria lychnidiflora (DC.) Lodé., 2012
- Native range

Synonyms
- This species has 18 synonyms: (see text)

Species of plant

Leuenbergeria lychnidiflora, commonly known as pitittache, or in Spanish as cactus árbol del matrimonio (which translates as "matrimony tree cactus"), is a species of succulent flowering plant in the genus Leuenbergeria, within the family Cactaceae. It is native to southwestern Mexico, Guatemala, El Salvador, Honduras, Nicaragua, and Costa Rica.

== Description ==
Leuenbergeria lychnidiflora is a species of treelike cactus that can reach 10 (or occasionally up to approximately 15) meters in height. It develops a robust trunk that can reach 30 to 40 cm in diameter, with a rough, cracked surface. The areoles on the trunk are persistent, and have conspicuous spines. Young specimens exhibit monopodial branching, while mature specimens develop branches arranged in a subverticillate (almost whorled), horizontal, or diffused manner.

Stem

The stems are cylindrical, and have bark from the eary stages of development. The areoles, which measure 3 to 5 mm in diameter, contain a tomentum and hairs which are light brown-gray in color, along with trichomes on young plants. 1 to 2 (or occasionally 3) leaves develop per areole. These are somewhat fleshy, sessile or with a very short petiole, and are variable in shape; they may be obovate, elliptical, oblanceolate, or almost orbicular. They grow to 2 to 8 cm in length, or exceptionally up to 10 cm, and 1 to 4 cm in width, rarely up to 5 cm. They are green in color, and exhibit pseudopalmate venation, with a prominent central vein and 2 to 6 lateral veins.

The areoles on the branches generally contain 1 to 3 spines, which measure 2 to 7 cm in length, or on occasion up to 9 cm. These spines are shorter and thinner on young branches, where they have tinges of yellow or red. With age, they become thicker and grayish in color. On the trunk, the areoles contain a much larger number of spines each, normally between 10 and 30; these can measure 3 to 12 cm in length.

The flowers are solitary and may appear terminally or laterally on the branches. They can reach 6 cm in diameter, and somewhat resemble roses. The peduncle measures 0.5 to 1 cm in length, although it can occasionally reach 3 cm. The receptacle has many bracts, which are arranged in a spiral pattern; these are similar to reduced leaves, and measure 1 to 2 cm in length. The areoles on the bracts contain tomentum and trichomes, and on rare occasions, one short spine. The outer tepals are small and green to greenish-red in color, while the inner tepals are obovate and measure 8 to 15 mm in length. Before anthesis, they have orange tones, and afterwards, their colors range from yellow to intense orange to brick red. The apices are emarginate or cleft, and their margins are laciniate or eroded.

Flower

The flower contains approximately 250 stamens, which have cream-colored filaments and light yellow anthers. The filaments are longer than the style. The stigma is globose in shape, and sits in the middle of where the anthers meet. The ovary is superior, and the pollen grains are small and colpate. The flowers are bisexual; however, like other species in this genus, reproduction depends on cross-pollination. This species primarily reproduces sexually; there is no evidence of vegetative reproduction under natural conditions.

The fruits are globose or slightly pear-shaped, and reach 2.5 to 4 cm in diameter. They are yellow or yellow-green in color, often with reddish tinges, and develop a characteristic scent as they mature. The surface of the fruit is almost smooth, and the skin is slightly leathery. The bracts fall off as the fruit matures. Each fruit contains 100 to 150 obovate seeds, which measure approximately 3 to 3.5 mm in length.

== Distribution and habitat ==
Leuenbergeria lychnidiflora is native to southwestern Mexico and most of Central America (i.e., in Guatemala, El Salvador, Honduras, Nicaragua, and Costa Rica). In Mexico, it is found primarily in the state of Oaxaca, where it grows in various places in the region of the Isthmus of Tehuantepec; these include Tehuantepec, Salina Cruz, Ciudad Ixtepec, La Ventosa, Tequisistlán, and Juchitán, as well as in the region near the Bahías de Huatulco. It has also been recorded as being present in the neighboring state of Guerrero.

It inhabits tropical ecosystems which have a significant dry season at elevations of 0 to 1200 meters above sea level. It grows in dry-deciduous tropical forests and in low spiny forests in flat areas and on shallow slopes, as well as in valleys near the Pacific coasts of Mexico and Central America. It is native to areas that receive rainfall during the summer.

== Ecology ==
From the perspective of the plant community as a whole, Leuenbergeria lychnidiflora forms part of the canopy of spiny and dry-deciduous forests. Although it is not yet known exactly how this plant disperses its seeds, the characteristics of the fruit suggest that generalist frugivores may serve this purpose. These organisms facilitate endozoochory (the dispersion of seeds by animals that eat the fruits) or synzoochory (when the seeds are carried in the mouths or mouthparts of animals to a new location). This species exhibits sclereids in its internal cortex and secondary phloem tissues. These structures harden the fruits (and the plant in general) and make it more difficult for rodents and other vertebrates to consume them. However, some observations note the presence of beetle larvae on the seeds, indication interactions with predatory or boring insects.

Fruits

The leaves drop during the dry season, a time of the year which varies slightly depending on where in its geographical distribution a plant is. During this time, the plant enters a phase of vegetative dormancy. The regrowth of branches and leaves occurs with the first rains of the year, which signal the end of the dry season and the beginning of the rainy season. Flowering occurs mostly during the rainy season, with local variation depending on the precipitation regime of each region. The fruits take several months to ripen after flowering, and can take until the beginning of the dry season to do so.

As of yet, there are no studies regarding the pollination of this species. However, the flowers open during the day, have orange-yellow tepals and abundant, exposed pollen, and have no nectar chamber. These characteristics suggest pollination by generalists; these include hymenopterans (such as bees) and hemipterans.

== Taxonomy ==
This species was first described as Pereskia lychnidiflora, a name published in 1828 by the Swiss botanist Augustin Pyramus de Candolle in the scientific journal Mémoires du Museum d'Histoire Naturelle 17: 75.

Later, the French botanist Joël Lodé transferred the species to the genus Leuenbergeria, renaming it Leuenbergeria lychnidiflora. He registered these changes in the scientific journal Cactus-aventures International 97: 27, published in 2012.

Etymology

- Leuenbergeria: the genus name honors the Swiss botanist Beat Ernst Leuenberger (1946–2010), a specialist in the subfamily Pereskioideae who was responsible for the tropical collections of the Berlin Botanical Garden.
- lychnidiflora: the specific epithet is derived from the name of the genus Lychnis (now called Silene) and the Latin suffix -flōrus (meaning"-flowered"), in reference to the similar appearance of this species' orange-yellow flowers to those of Lychnis grandiflora (now known as Silene banksia).

Synonyms

- Cactus fimbriatus Moc. & Sessé ex DC., 1828
- Cactus opuntiiflorus Moc. & Sessé ex Pfeiff., 1837
- Opuntia golziana K.Schum., 1898
- Opuntia pititache (Karw. ex Pfeiff.) F.A.C.Weber, 1898
- Pereskia autumnalis (Eichlam) Rose, 1909
- Pereskia calandriniifolia Salm-Dyck, 1850
- Pereskia conzattii Britton & Rose, 1919
- Pereskia lychnidiflora DC., 1828 (basionym)
- Pereskia nicoyana F.A.C.Weber, 1902
- Pereskia opuntiiflora DC., 1828
- Pereskia pititache Karw. ex Pfeiff., 1837
- Pereskiopsis autumnalis Eichlam, 1909
- Pereskiopsis opuntiiflora (DC.) Britton & Rose, 1907
- Pereskiopsis pititache (Karw. ex Pfeiff.) Britton & Rose, 1907
- Rhodocactus autumnalis (Eichlam) F.M.Knuth, 1936
- Rhodocactus conzattii (Britton & Rose) Backeb., 1958
- Rhodocactus lychnidiflorus (DC.) F.M.Knuth, 1936
- Rhodocactus nicoyanus (F.A.C.Weber) F.M.Knuth, 1936

== Conservation status ==
On the IUCN Red List, Leuenbergeria lychnidiflora is classified as being of Least Concern (LC). This is due to the species' wide geographical distribution and local abundance in many areas, especially in Guatemala.

However, some populations are in less-favorable situations. In Mexico, locals claim that the species was more abundant in the past, since part of its habitat has been destroyed by agricultural expansion. In the area around Nizandá, Oaxaca, specimens survive only in remaining fragments of dry-deciduous tropical forest surrounded by areas now used for agriculture. In contrast, though, Leuenbergeria lychnidiflora remains one of the dominant species of the more well-preserved dry-deciduous tropical forests of the Isthmus of Tehuantepec. In Costa Rica, the species is rare, and it is considered to be at risk of extinction on a national scale. For decades, there were no known wild populations, and it was thought that the species had already disappeared from the country; currently, though, there are small populations of a few individuals near Bagaces and Puerto Humo in Guanacaste Province.

The main threat to this species' survival is the loss of natural habitat due to land use change. In some regions, extensive areas of dry tropical forest have been destroyed to make way for agriculture, reducing the amount of suitable habitat.

== Uses ==
The species is primarily cultivated as an ornamental, and it may be propagated via cuttings. In Mexico and El Salvador, it is frequently used as a living fence to mark the boundaries of fields and to protect crops or property.

In Guetemala, its spines are occasionally used as needles. There are also records of its use in the construction of houses, in which case its stems act as structural beams.

== Common names ==
Local Spanish common names for this species include guititache, guichitache, guitache, patilón, cruz del matrimonio, cactus árbol del matrimonio, cuncú, and cuncu Marín.

== Gallery ==
Growth form

Plant without leaves

Spiny trunk

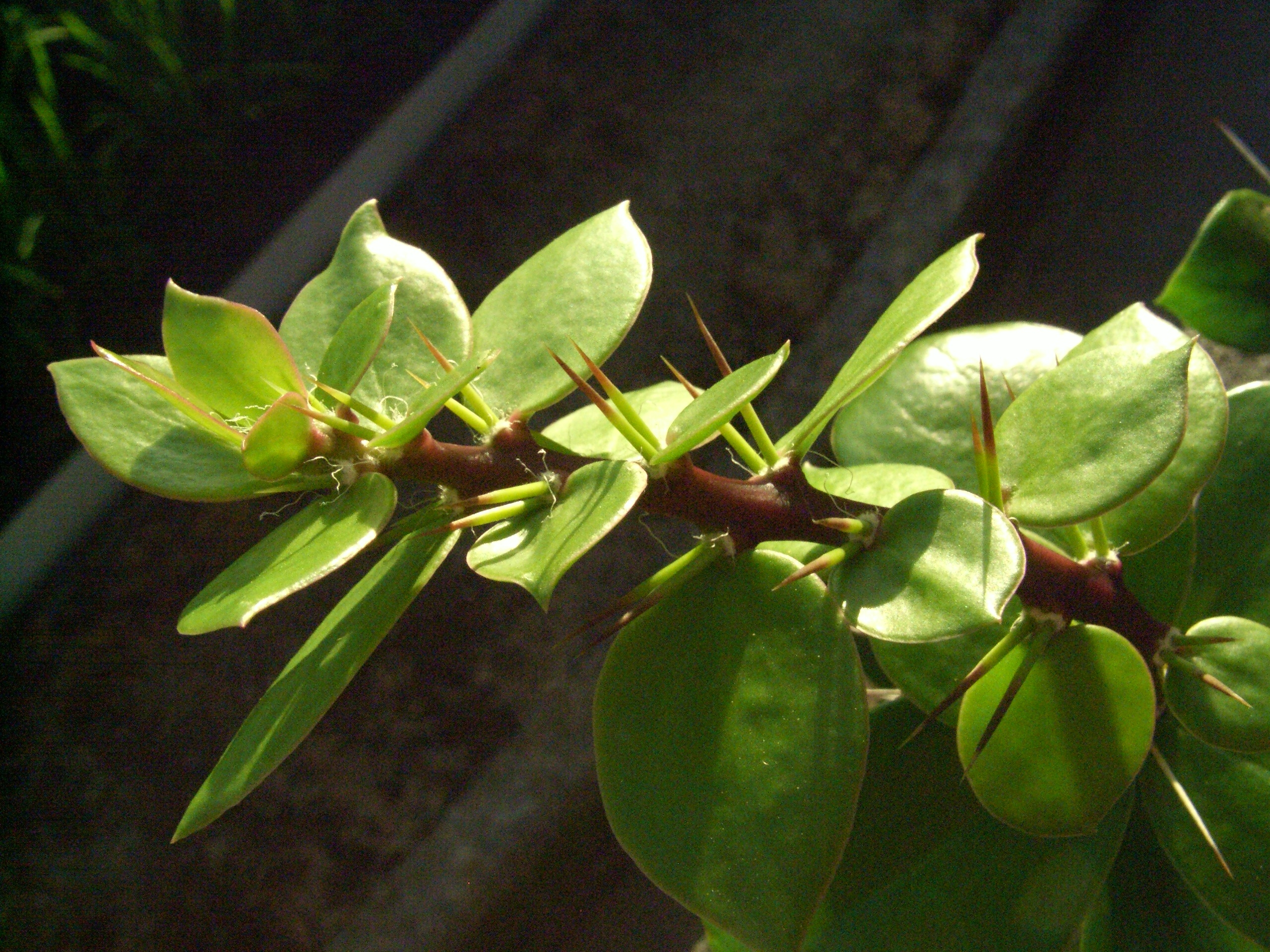
Leaves and spines

Fruits
