= Mountain jet =

Type of jet stream

Mountain jets are a type of jet stream created by surface winds channeled through mountain passes, sometimes causing high wind speeds and drastic temperature changes.

== Central America jets ==
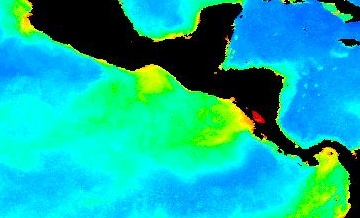
Chlorophyll growth due to nutrients mixed by 2001 winter jets

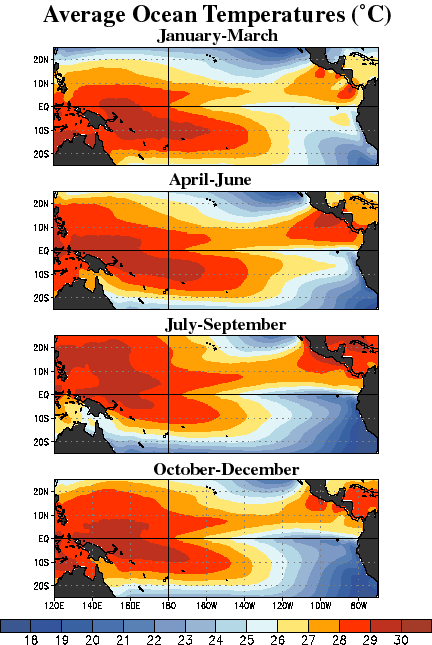
Mountain jet effects are apparent in average temperatures around Central America

The North Pacific east of about 120°W is strongly influenced by winds blowing through gaps in the Central American cordillera. Air flow in the region forms the Intra-Americas Low-Level Jet, a westward flow about 1 km above sea level. This flow, trade winds, and cold air flowing south from North America contribute to winds flowing through several mountain valleys.

Along Central America are three main wind jets through breaks in the American Cordillera, on the Pacific Ocean side due to prevailing winds.

- Tehuano wind blows from the Gulf of Mexico through Chivela Pass in Mexico's Isthmus of Tehuantepec and out over the Gulf of Tehuantepec on the Pacific coast. Chivela Pass is a gap between the Sierra Madre del Sur and the Sierra Madre range to the south.
- Papagayo wind shrieks over the lakes of Nicaragua and pushes far out over the Gulf of Papagayo on the Pacific coast. The Cordillera Central Mountains rise to the south, gradually descending to Gatun Lake and the Isthmus of Panama.
- Panama winds slice through to the Pacific through the Gaillard Cut in Panama, which also holds the Panama Canal.

=== Cause ===
The air flow is due to surges of cold dense air originating from the North American continent.

The meteorological mechanism that causes Tehuano and Papagayo winds is relatively simple. In the winter, cold high-pressure weather systems move southward from North America over the Gulf of Mexico. These high pressure systems create strong pressure gradients between the atmosphere over the Gulf of Mexico and the warmer, moister atmosphere over the Pacific Ocean. Just as a river flows from high elevations to lower elevations, the air in the high pressure system will flow "downhill" toward lower pressure, but the Cordillera mountains block the flow of air, channeling it through Chivela Pass in Mexico, the lake district of Nicaragua, and also Gaillard (Culebra) Cut in Panama. Many times, a Tehuano wind is followed by Papagayo and Panama winds a few days later as the high pressure system moves south.

The arrival of these cold surges, and their associated anticyclonic circulation, strengthens the trade winds at low latitudes, and this effect can last for several days. The wind flow over Central America is actually composed of the confluence of two air streams; one from the north, associated with cold surges, and the other from the northeast, associated with trade winds north of South America.

=== Local effects ===
The winds blow at speeds of 80 km/h or more down the hillsides from Chivela Pass and over the waters of the Gulf of Tehuantepec, sometimes extending more than 500 miles (800 km) into the Pacific Ocean. The surface waters under the Gulf of Tehuantepec wind jet can cool by as much as 10 °C in a day. In addition to the cold water that is detectable from other satellite sensors, the ocean's response to these winds shows up in satellite estimates of chlorophyll from ocean color measurements. The cold water and high chlorophyll concentration are signatures of mixing and upwelling of cold, nutrient-rich deep water. Fish converge on this food source, which supports the highly successful fishing industry in the Gulf of Tehuantepec.
