= Climate of Serbia =

Köppen climate classification map of Serbia

The climate of Serbia is between a continental climate in the north, with cold dry winters, and warm, humid summers with well distributed rainfall patterns, and a more Mediterranean climate in the south with hot, dry summers and autumns and average relatively cool and more rainy winters with heavy mountain snowfall. Differences in elevation, proximity to the Adriatic Sea and Aegean Sea and large river basins, as well as exposure to the winds account for climate differences.

Most of Northern Serbia possesses a typical continental climate, with air masses from northern and western Europe which shape its climatic profile. South and South-east of Serbia is subject to strong Mediterranean influences (hotter summers and milder winters). However, the Dinaric Alps and other mountain ranges contribute to the cooling down a large part of the warm air masses. Winters are quite harsh in Raška (region) because of the mountains which encircle the plateau. One of the climatic features of Serbia is Košava, a cold and very squally southeastern wind which starts in the Carpathian Mountains and follows the Danube northwest through the Iron Gate where it gains a jet effect and continues to Belgrade and can spread as far south as Niš. Mediterranean micro-regions exist throughout southern Serbia, in Zlatibor and the Pčinja District around valley and river Pčinja.

The average annual air temperature for the period 1981–2017 for the area with an altitude of up to 300 m (984 ft) is 11.6 °C (52.9 °F). The areas with an altitude of 300 to 500 m (984 to 1,640 ft) have an average annual temperature of around 11.0 °C (51.8 °F), and over 1,000 m (3,281 ft) of altitude around 7.5 °C (45.5 °F).

== Extreme weather and records ==
Serbia is one of few European countries with a very high risk exposure to natural hazards (earthquakes, storms, floods and droughts). It is estimated that potential floods, particularly in areas of Central Serbia, threaten over 500 larger settlements and an area of 16,000 square kilometres. The most disastrous were the floods in May 2014, when 57 people died and a damage of over 1.5 billion euros was inflicted. Apart from floods, droughts are present too, with the 2012 drought causing over 1 billion euros in damages.

The lowest recorded temperature in Serbia was −39.5 °C (−39.1 °F) (January 26, 2006, Karajukića Bunari in Pešter) (unofficially -42°C in Sjenica), and the highest was 44.9 °C or 112.8 °F (July 24, 2007, Smederevska Palanka).

== Examples ==
Climate data for Belgrade (1991–2020, extremes 1936–present)
Month	Jan	Feb	Mar	Apr	May	Jun	Jul	Aug	Sep	Oct	Nov	Dec	Year
Record high °C (°F)	20.7 (69.3)	23.9 (75.0)	30.0 (86.0)	32.4 (90.3)	34.9 (94.8)	37.4 (99.3)	43.6 (110.5)	40.0 (104.0)	41.8 (107.2)	33.7 (92.7)	28.4 (83.1)	22.6 (72.7)	43.6 (110.5)
Mean daily maximum °C (°F)	5.2 (41.4)	7.8 (46.0)	13.1 (55.6)	18.9 (66.0)	23.6 (74.5)	27.1 (80.8)	29.3 (84.7)	29.7 (85.5)	24.3 (75.7)	18.7 (65.7)	12.2 (54.0)	6.1 (43.0)	18.0 (64.4)
Daily mean °C (°F)	1.9 (35.4)	3.8 (38.8)	8.3 (46.9)	13.6 (56.5)	18.2 (64.8)	21.9 (71.4)	23.8 (74.8)	23.8 (74.8)	18.5 (65.3)	13.3 (55.9)	8.1 (46.6)	3.0 (37.4)	13.0 (55.4)
Mean daily minimum °C (°F)	−0.7 (30.7)	0.6 (33.1)	4.2 (39.6)	8.8 (47.8)	13.2 (55.8)	16.7 (62.1)	18.4 (65.1)	18.5 (65.3)	14.1 (57.4)	9.4 (48.9)	5.1 (41.2)	0.5 (32.9)	9.1 (48.4)
Record low °C (°F)	−24.5 (−12.1)	−20.5 (−4.9)	−12.4 (9.7)	−3.4 (25.9)	0.4 (32.7)	4.6 (40.3)	8.3 (46.9)	6.7 (44.1)	0.6 (33.1)	−6.9 (19.6)	−8.3 (17.1)	−15.8 (3.6)	−24.5 (−12.1)
Average precipitation mm (inches)	47.9 (1.89)	43.5 (1.71)	48.7 (1.92)	51.5 (2.03)	72.3 (2.85)	95.6 (3.76)	66.5 (2.62)	55.1 (2.17)	58.6 (2.31)	54.8 (2.16)	49.6 (1.95)	54.8 (2.16)	698.9 (27.52)
Average precipitation days (≥ 0.1 mm)	13.5	12.3	11.3	12.4	13.5	12.2	10.0	8.4	9.5	10.5	10.8	13.8	138.2
Average snowy days	9.7	7.3	4.2	0.7	0.0	0.0	0.0	0.0	0.0	0.1	3.0	7.8	32.8
Average relative humidity (%)	77.9	71.4	62.7	59.9	61.9	62.5	59.8	59.5	65.8	71.4	75.1	79.5	67.3
Mean monthly sunshine hours	70.7	96.2	146.7	186.7	224.7	253.9	278.8	262.6	192.6	155.0	92.1	60.3	2,020.3
Average ultraviolet index	1	2	3	5	7	8	8	7	5	3	2	1	4
Source 1: Republic Hydrometeorological Service of Serbia
Source 2: Weather Atlas (UV), Meteo Climat (record highs and lows)

Climate data for Niš (1991–2020, extremes 1940–present)
Month	Jan	Feb	Mar	Apr	May	Jun	Jul	Aug	Sep	Oct	Nov	Dec	Year
Record high °C (°F)	21.7 (71.1)	24.0 (75.2)	33.5 (92.3)	33.0 (91.4)	35.3 (95.5)	40.3 (104.5)	44.2 (111.6)	42.2 (108.0)	39.6 (103.3)	35.0 (95.0)	29.0 (84.2)	22.2 (72.0)	44.2 (111.6)
Mean daily maximum °C (°F)	5.3 (41.5)	8.3 (46.9)	13.6 (56.5)	19.0 (66.2)	23.8 (74.8)	27.9 (82.2)	30.4 (86.7)	30.9 (87.6)	25.4 (77.7)	19.5 (67.1)	13.0 (55.4)	6.3 (43.3)	18.6 (65.5)
Daily mean °C (°F)	0.9 (33.6)	3.1 (37.6)	7.5 (45.5)	12.6 (54.7)	17.2 (63.0)	21.1 (70.0)	23.1 (73.6)	23.1 (73.6)	18.0 (64.4)	12.6 (54.7)	7.4 (45.3)	2.3 (36.1)	12.4 (54.3)
Mean daily minimum °C (°F)	−2.5 (27.5)	−1.1 (30.0)	2.4 (36.3)	6.7 (44.1)	11.1 (52.0)	14.6 (58.3)	16.2 (61.2)	16.2 (61.2)	12.1 (53.8)	7.6 (45.7)	3.3 (37.9)	−0.9 (30.4)	7.1 (44.8)
Record low °C (°F)	−23.7 (−10.7)	−21.6 (−6.9)	−13.2 (8.2)	−5.6 (21.9)	−1.0 (30.2)	4.2 (39.6)	4.1 (39.4)	4.6 (40.3)	−2.2 (28.0)	−6.8 (19.8)	−14.0 (6.8)	−16.6 (2.1)	−23.7 (−10.7)
Average precipitation mm (inches)	42.9 (1.69)	39.0 (1.54)	47.6 (1.87)	55.9 (2.20)	69.8 (2.75)	57.6 (2.27)	49.4 (1.94)	43.9 (1.73)	49.0 (1.93)	55.8 (2.20)	49.0 (1.93)	53.9 (2.12)	613.8 (24.17)
Average precipitation days (≥ 0.1 mm)	13.1	12.4	12.3	12.6	13.2	10.9	9.0	7.5	9.5	9.6	10.4	13.6	134.1
Average snowy days	9.8	8.0	4.9	0.9	0.0	0.0	0.0	0.0	0.0	0.3	3.0	8.2	35.1
Average relative humidity (%)	79.1	73.3	65.3	63.0	66.0	64.6	60.6	60.3	66.8	73.5	76.5	80.3	69.1
Mean monthly sunshine hours	67.5	93.7	156.0	179.2	212.5	250.2	272.7	275.6	200.6	142.4	84.4	51.6	1,986.4
Source 1: Republic Hydrometeorological Service of Serbia
Source 2: Meteo Climat (record highs and lows)

Climate data for Rimski Šančevi, Novi Sad (1991–2020, extremes 1948–present)
Month	Jan	Feb	Mar	Apr	May	Jun	Jul	Aug	Sep	Oct	Nov	Dec	Year
Record high °C (°F)	18.9 (66.0)	22.4 (72.3)	30.0 (86.0)	31.5 (88.7)	34.2 (93.6)	37.6 (99.7)	41.6 (106.9)	40.0 (104.0)	37.4 (99.3)	30.1 (86.2)	26.9 (80.4)	21.0 (69.8)	41.6 (106.9)
Mean daily maximum °C (°F)	4.3 (39.7)	6.9 (44.4)	12.7 (54.9)	18.4 (65.1)	23.1 (73.6)	26.6 (79.9)	28.8 (83.8)	29.2 (84.6)	23.9 (75.0)	18.3 (64.9)	11.5 (52.7)	5.1 (41.2)	17.4 (63.3)
Daily mean °C (°F)	0.7 (33.3)	2.3 (36.1)	7.0 (44.6)	12.4 (54.3)	17.3 (63.1)	20.9 (69.6)	22.5 (72.5)	22.4 (72.3)	17.2 (63.0)	12.0 (53.6)	6.8 (44.2)	1.8 (35.2)	11.9 (53.4)
Mean daily minimum °C (°F)	−2.5 (27.5)	−1.7 (28.9)	1.9 (35.4)	6.6 (43.9)	11.4 (52.5)	14.9 (58.8)	16.1 (61.0)	16.1 (61.0)	11.8 (53.2)	7.3 (45.1)	3.2 (37.8)	−1.2 (29.8)	7.0 (44.6)
Record low °C (°F)	−30.7 (−23.3)	−28.6 (−19.5)	−19.9 (−3.8)	−6.2 (20.8)	−0.4 (31.3)	0.2 (32.4)	5.4 (41.7)	6.9 (44.4)	−1.6 (29.1)	−6.4 (20.5)	−13.8 (7.2)	−24.0 (−11.2)	−30.7 (−23.3)
Average precipitation mm (inches)	38.9 (1.53)	36.4 (1.43)	38.6 (1.52)	46.6 (1.83)	77.3 (3.04)	92.2 (3.63)	68.1 (2.68)	59.7 (2.35)	58.8 (2.31)	58.6 (2.31)	51.5 (2.03)	49.1 (1.93)	675.8 (26.61)
Average precipitation days (≥ 0.1 mm)	12.1	10.5	10.6	11.2	13.4	11.1	9.9	8.1	10.1	10.1	10.8	12.9	130.8
Average snowy days	6.4	5.8	2.7	0.4	0.0	0.0	0.0	0.0	0.0	0.1	1.9	4.9	22.2
Average relative humidity (%)	85.5	80.2	70.8	64.4	67.9	69.7	68.2	67.4	72.5	77.1	82.1	86.7	74.5
Mean monthly sunshine hours	67.9	100.6	164.1	205.8	257.3	284.8	316.2	298.9	207.1	160.9	94.7	59.4	2,217.7
Source 1: Republic Hydrometeorological Service of Serbia
Source 2: Meteo Climat (record highs and lows)

Climate data for Kragujevac (1991–2020, extremes 1961–2020)
Month	Jan	Feb	Mar	Apr	May	Jun	Jul	Aug	Sep	Oct	Nov	Dec	Year
Record high °C (°F)	20.6 (69.1)	25.2 (77.4)	29.4 (84.9)	32.0 (89.6)	35.4 (95.7)	39.4 (102.9)	43.9 (111.0)	40.4 (104.7)	37.8 (100.0)	34.7 (94.5)	27.6 (81.7)	21.0 (69.8)	43.9 (111.0)
Mean daily maximum °C (°F)	5.7 (42.3)	8.2 (46.8)	13.1 (55.6)	18.4 (65.1)	23.0 (73.4)	26.9 (80.4)	29.3 (84.7)	29.6 (85.3)	24.3 (75.7)	18.8 (65.8)	12.7 (54.9)	6.5 (43.7)	18.0 (64.4)
Daily mean °C (°F)	1.3 (34.3)	3.0 (37.4)	7.1 (44.8)	12.1 (53.8)	16.7 (62.1)	20.7 (69.3)	22.6 (72.7)	22.3 (72.1)	17.3 (63.1)	12.2 (54.0)	7.4 (45.3)	2.4 (36.3)	12.1 (53.8)
Mean daily minimum °C (°F)	−2.4 (27.7)	−1.3 (29.7)	2.0 (35.6)	6.1 (43.0)	10.5 (50.9)	14.4 (57.9)	15.9 (60.6)	15.6 (60.1)	11.6 (52.9)	7.2 (45.0)	3.3 (37.9)	−0.9 (30.4)	6.8 (44.2)
Record low °C (°F)	−27.6 (−17.7)	−24.4 (−11.9)	−18.3 (−0.9)	−5.8 (21.6)	−0.6 (30.9)	2.7 (36.9)	7.2 (45.0)	4.6 (40.3)	−2.2 (28.0)	−6.6 (20.1)	−16.4 (2.5)	−20.7 (−5.3)	−27.6 (−17.7)
Average precipitation mm (inches)	42.1 (1.66)	40.1 (1.58)	46.6 (1.83)	54.3 (2.14)	70.3 (2.77)	77.2 (3.04)	65.8 (2.59)	56.0 (2.20)	53.6 (2.11)	54.2 (2.13)	44.6 (1.76)	47.0 (1.85)	651.8 (25.66)
Average precipitation days (≥ 0.1 mm)	12.8	12.5	11.6	11.9	13.4	11.3	9.3	7.6	9.7	10.2	10.7	12.8	133.8
Average snowy days	8.5	7.7	3.8	0.7	0.0	0.0	0.0	0.0	0.0	0.1	2.5	6.6	29.9
Average relative humidity (%)	79.5	74.9	68.5	66.6	69.4	67.7	64.2	65.3	70.7	75.4	76.7	80.8	71.6
Mean monthly sunshine hours	71.9	91.3	148.4	184.7	225.7	260.1	293.3	280.2	197.0	148.5	92.5	62.3	2,055.9
Source: Republic Hydrometeorological Service of Serbia

Climate data for Leskovac (1991–2020, extremes 1961–2020)
Month	Jan	Feb	Mar	Apr	May	Jun	Jul	Aug	Sep	Oct	Nov	Dec	Year
Record high °C (°F)	20.0 (68.0)	24.8 (76.6)	27.8 (82.0)	32.6 (90.7)	35.0 (95.0)	38.6 (101.5)	43.7 (110.7)	41.3 (106.3)	37.4 (99.3)	35.0 (95.0)	28.6 (83.5)	21.4 (70.5)	43.7 (110.7)
Mean daily maximum °C (°F)	4.8 (40.6)	8.0 (46.4)	13.3 (55.9)	18.7 (65.7)	23.4 (74.1)	27.5 (81.5)	30.0 (86.0)	30.5 (86.9)	25.1 (77.2)	19.1 (66.4)	12.4 (54.3)	5.7 (42.3)	18.2 (64.8)
Daily mean °C (°F)	0.2 (32.4)	2.4 (36.3)	6.9 (44.4)	11.8 (53.2)	16.4 (61.5)	20.4 (68.7)	22.3 (72.1)	22.0 (71.6)	16.8 (62.2)	11.5 (52.7)	6.4 (43.5)	1.7 (35.1)	11.6 (52.9)
Mean daily minimum °C (°F)	−3.6 (25.5)	−2.1 (28.2)	1.3 (34.3)	5.3 (41.5)	9.9 (49.8)	13.5 (56.3)	14.7 (58.5)	14.3 (57.7)	10.5 (50.9)	6.0 (42.8)	1.9 (35.4)	−1.6 (29.1)	5.8 (42.4)
Record low °C (°F)	−30.5 (−22.9)	−26.8 (−16.2)	−18.2 (−0.8)	−6.1 (21.0)	−1.7 (28.9)	2.7 (36.9)	5.4 (41.7)	4.4 (39.9)	−3.8 (25.2)	−8.7 (16.3)	−19.6 (−3.3)	−21.7 (−7.1)	−30.5 (−22.9)
Average precipitation mm (inches)	46.2 (1.82)	45.5 (1.79)	52.1 (2.05)	62.8 (2.47)	69.4 (2.73)	61.7 (2.43)	51.2 (2.02)	45.1 (1.78)	52.2 (2.06)	60.7 (2.39)	55.5 (2.19)	58.2 (2.29)	660.6 (26.01)
Average precipitation days (≥ 0.1 mm)	13.9	12.5	12.5	12.9	14.2	11.0	8.5	7.3	9.7	10.4	11.3	14.0	138.2
Average snowy days	9.0	7.4	4.7	0.8	0.0	0.0	0.0	0.0	0.0	0.3	2.8	7.6	32.6
Average relative humidity (%)	81.6	76.1	69.0	67.6	69.8	66.9	63.8	64.3	71.1	76.7	79.7	83.1	72.5
Mean monthly sunshine hours	67.0	88.3	146.1	178.6	219.6	264.6	301.2	293.0	202.6	139.8	84.8	50.5	2,036.1
Source: Republic Hydrometeorological Service of Serbia

Climate data for Zlatibor (1991–2020, extremes 1961–2020)
Month	Jan	Feb	Mar	Apr	May	Jun	Jul	Aug	Sep	Oct	Nov	Dec	Year
Record high °C (°F)	17.6 (63.7)	20.3 (68.5)	24.9 (76.8)	26.4 (79.5)	30.1 (86.2)	32.2 (90.0)	35.8 (96.4)	34.4 (93.9)	33.2 (91.8)	28.6 (83.5)	25.5 (77.9)	17.2 (63.0)	35.8 (96.4)
Mean daily maximum °C (°F)	2.4 (36.3)	3.9 (39.0)	7.9 (46.2)	12.9 (55.2)	17.6 (63.7)	21.5 (70.7)	23.6 (74.5)	24.1 (75.4)	18.7 (65.7)	14.2 (57.6)	8.8 (47.8)	2.9 (37.2)	13.2 (55.8)
Daily mean °C (°F)	−1.7 (28.9)	−0.6 (30.9)	2.9 (37.2)	7.8 (46.0)	12.4 (54.3)	16.2 (61.2)	18.1 (64.6)	18.3 (64.9)	13.4 (56.1)	9.1 (48.4)	4.3 (39.7)	−0.9 (30.4)	8.3 (46.9)
Mean daily minimum °C (°F)	−4.8 (23.4)	−4.1 (24.6)	−0.9 (30.4)	3.5 (38.3)	7.8 (46.0)	11.4 (52.5)	13.1 (55.6)	13.5 (56.3)	9.3 (48.7)	5.3 (41.5)	1.1 (34.0)	−3.9 (25.0)	4.3 (39.7)
Record low °C (°F)	−22.8 (−9.0)	−19.9 (−3.8)	−18.7 (−1.7)	−8.8 (16.2)	−3.3 (26.1)	−2.2 (28.0)	4.1 (39.4)	2.4 (36.3)	−2.0 (28.4)	−11.2 (11.8)	−14.5 (5.9)	−19.0 (−2.2)	−22.8 (−9.0)
Average precipitation mm (inches)	63.4 (2.50)	71.2 (2.80)	81.0 (3.19)	82.1 (3.23)	105.1 (4.14)	115.1 (4.53)	101.3 (3.99)	74.5 (2.93)	96.4 (3.80)	81.4 (3.20)	80.4 (3.17)	79.9 (3.15)	1,031.8 (40.62)
Average precipitation days (≥ 0.1 mm)	15.1	15.5	15.3	16.0	16.5	14.7	11.8	10.7	12.2	11.8	12.5	15.8	167.9
Average snowy days	13.4	12.9	11.1	4.4	0.5	0.1	0.0	0.0	0.1	1.7	6.1	12.1	62.4
Average relative humidity (%)	83.3	79.7	74.0	69.4	70.8	72.1	69.7	68.6	74.4	77.6	79.7	85.0	75.4
Mean monthly sunshine hours	89.7	103.3	148.0	168.8	209.9	241.5	276.8	270.2	192.5	159.6	106.7	76.6	2,043.6
Source: Republic Hydrometeorological Service of Serbia

Climate data for Kopaonik (1991–2020 normals, extremes 1961–2020)
Month	Jan	Feb	Mar	Apr	May	Jun	Jul	Aug	Sep	Oct	Nov	Dec	Year
Record high °C (°F)	12.7 (54.9)	14.5 (58.1)	16.8 (62.2)	19.5 (67.1)	23.7 (74.7)	25.6 (78.1)	30.0 (86.0)	29.2 (84.6)	26.5 (79.7)	22.4 (72.3)	21.4 (70.5)	16.3 (61.3)	30.0 (86.0)
Mean daily maximum °C (°F)	−0.9 (30.4)	−0.7 (30.7)	2.0 (35.6)	6.4 (43.5)	11.5 (52.7)	15.4 (59.7)	17.6 (63.7)	18.2 (64.8)	13.3 (55.9)	9.5 (49.1)	4.8 (40.6)	0.3 (32.5)	8.1 (46.6)
Daily mean °C (°F)	−4.5 (23.9)	−4.3 (24.3)	−1.8 (28.8)	2.6 (36.7)	7.4 (45.3)	11.3 (52.3)	13.3 (55.9)	13.6 (56.5)	9.0 (48.2)	5.3 (41.5)	1.1 (34.0)	−3.2 (26.2)	4.1 (39.4)
Mean daily minimum °C (°F)	−7.5 (18.5)	−7.4 (18.7)	−5.0 (23.0)	−0.8 (30.6)	3.6 (38.5)	7.3 (45.1)	8.9 (48.0)	9.4 (48.9)	5.6 (42.1)	2.0 (35.6)	−1.8 (28.8)	−6.1 (21.0)	0.7 (33.3)
Record low °C (°F)	−24.8 (−12.6)	−24.2 (−11.6)	−23.7 (−10.7)	−15.2 (4.6)	−8.6 (16.5)	−4.5 (23.9)	−3.3 (26.1)	−1.3 (29.7)	−7.6 (18.3)	−12.5 (9.5)	−17.5 (0.5)	−24.6 (−12.3)	−24.8 (−12.6)
Average precipitation mm (inches)	67.1 (2.64)	65.2 (2.57)	84.6 (3.33)	94.1 (3.70)	120.9 (4.76)	108.6 (4.28)	97.6 (3.84)	76.7 (3.02)	90.2 (3.55)	82.0 (3.23)	75.1 (2.96)	78.0 (3.07)	1,040.1 (40.95)
Average precipitation days (≥ 0.1 mm)	15.9	15.9	17.0	16.5	17.1	14.6	12.4	10.5	12.4	12.2	12.7	15.8	173.0
Average snowy days	16.3	15.3	16.3	11.5	3.8	0.4	0.1	0.1	1.0	3.7	8.4	14.7	91.6
Average relative humidity (%)	82.9	83.3	82.4	80.0	80.5	79.1	76.1	74.4	81.3	81.0	81.9	84.0	80.6
Mean monthly sunshine hours	77.8	78.9	111.2	131.1	147.5	180.6	222.5	222.2	155.6	133.4	91.0	70.9	1,622.7
Percentage possible sunshine	27	27	31	33	33	40	48	52	42	40	32	26	37
Source: Republic Hydrometeorological Service of Serbia
