= Garnacha =

Garnacha is a Spanish name that may refer to:

- Garnacha (grape), a red wine grape
- Garnacha (food), a fried corn tortilla dish
- Garnacha blanca, a white wine grape
- Garnacha Tintorera, a synonym of Alicante Bouschet
