= La Ventosa =

- Town
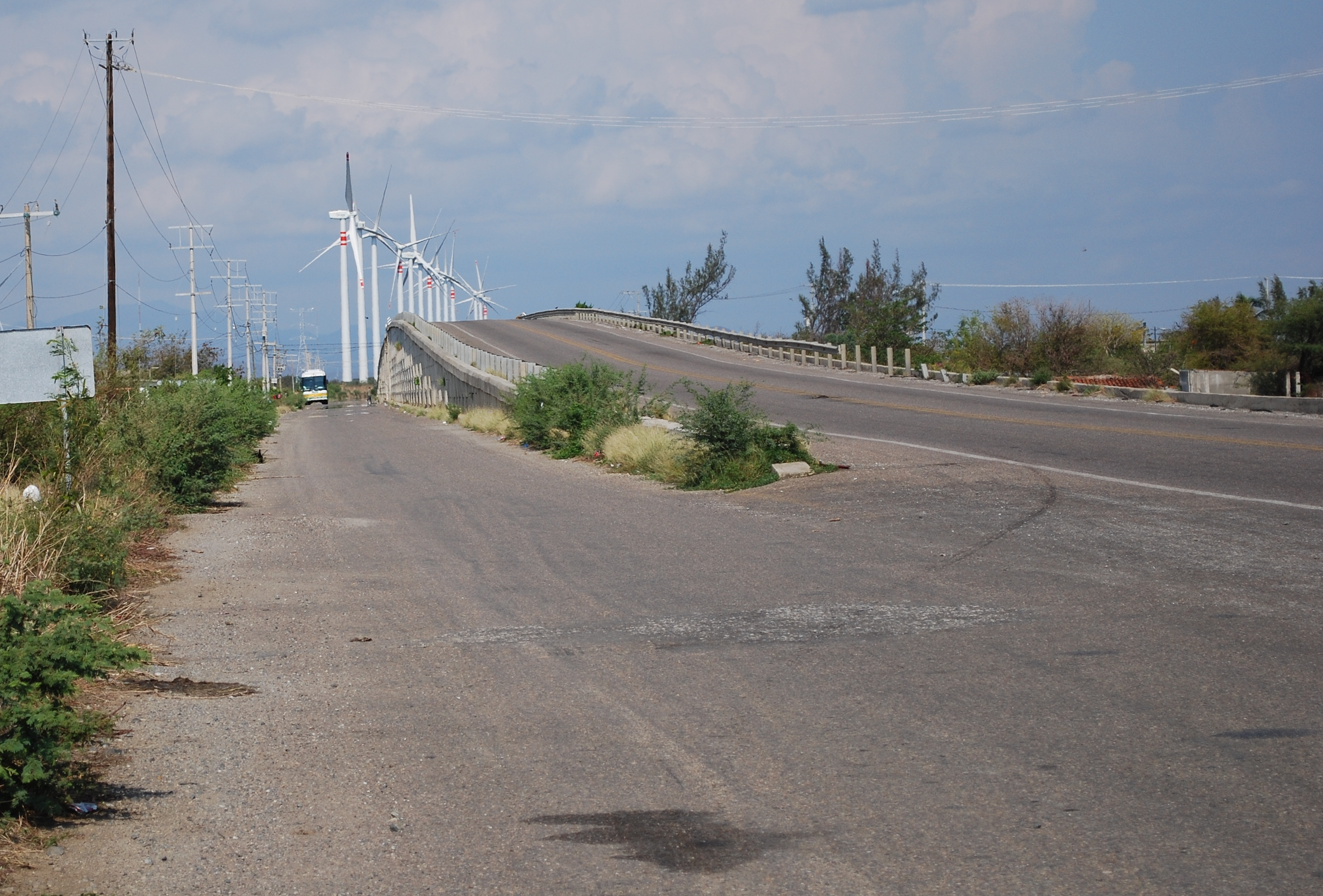

- Location within Oaxaca Location within Mexico
- Coordinates: 16°33′10″N 94°56′50″W
- Country: Mexico
- State: Oaxaca
- Municipality: Juchitán de Zaragoza

Population (2020)
  - Total: 6,123

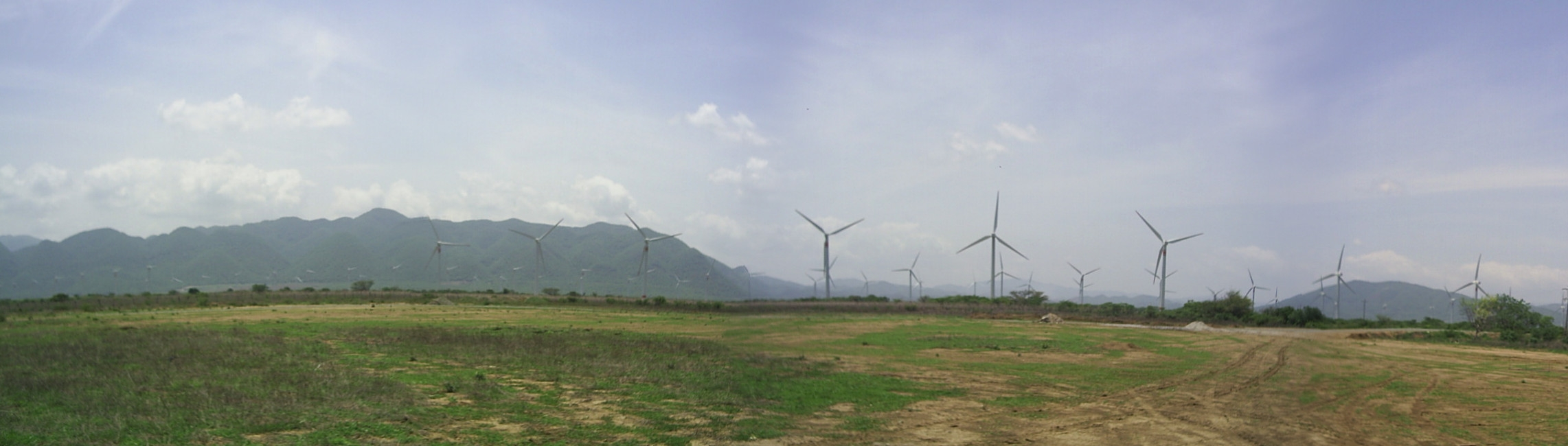
Wind-farms at La Ventosa

La Ventosa is a town of about 4000 inhabitants in the municipality of Juchitán de Zaragoza, in the state of Oaxaca, in southern Mexico. The name means "the windy one". Because of the strong winds in the area, which can destroy structures, destroy electricity infrastructure and force the government to cancel school hour, many wind-farms have been built in the area. It lies at the junction of Mexican Federal Highway 185 with Mexican Federal Highway 190. The town is 37 meters above sea level.
