= Wind gap (disambiguation) =

A wind gap is a dry valley once occupied by a stream or river, since captured by another stream. Wind gap may also refer to:

- Windgap, County Kilkenny, a village in County Kilkenny, Ireland
- Windgap Cove, a part of Scoat Fell, a mountain (fell) in the English Lake District
- Windgap (Pittsburgh), a neighborhood in the west area of Pittsburgh, Pennsylvania
- Wind Gap, Pennsylvania, a borough in Northampton County, Pennsylvania
- Wind Gap, Missouri, the fictional town in the book and television series Sharp Objects

== See also ==
- Mountain-gap wind
- Water gap
