= Carretera Transistmica =

Carretera Transistmica may be:

- Mexican Federal Highway 185
- Boyd-Roosevelt Highway
