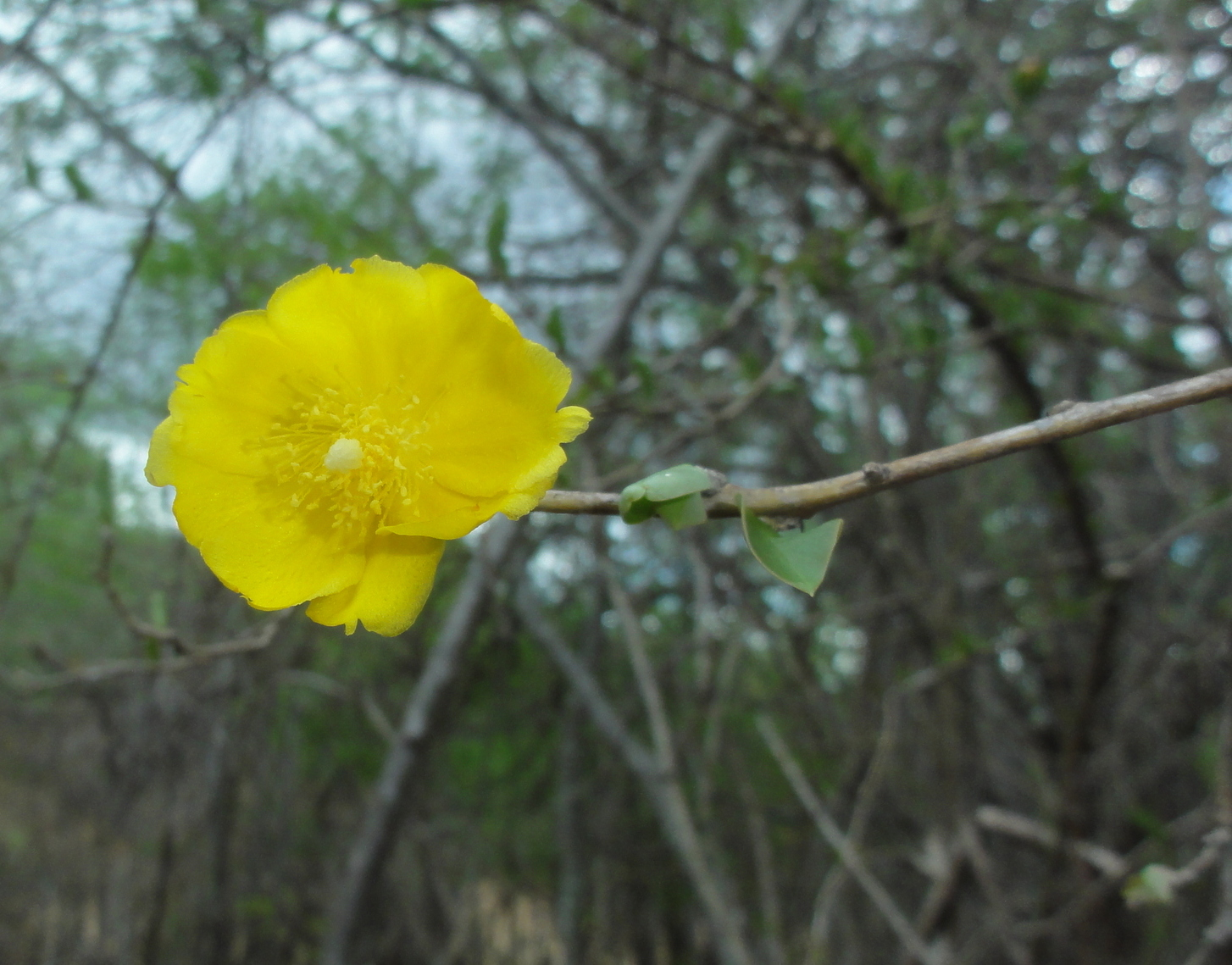

Conservation status
- Endangered (IUCN 3.1)

Scientific classification
- Kingdom: Plantae
- Clade: Embryophytes
- Clade: Tracheophytes
- Clade: Spermatophytes
- Clade: Angiosperms
- Clade: Eudicots
- Order: Caryophyllales
- Family: Cactaceae
- Genus: Leuenbergeria
- Species: L. aureiflora

Binomial name
- Leuenbergeria aureiflora (F.Ritter) Lodé

Synonyms
- Pereskia aureiflora F.Ritter

= Leuenbergeria aureiflora =

Species of cactus

Leuenbergeria aureiflora, formerly Pereskia aureiflora, is a species of cactus that is endemic to eastern Brazil. Its natural habitats are subtropical or tropical dry forests and hot deserts. It is threatened by habitat loss.
