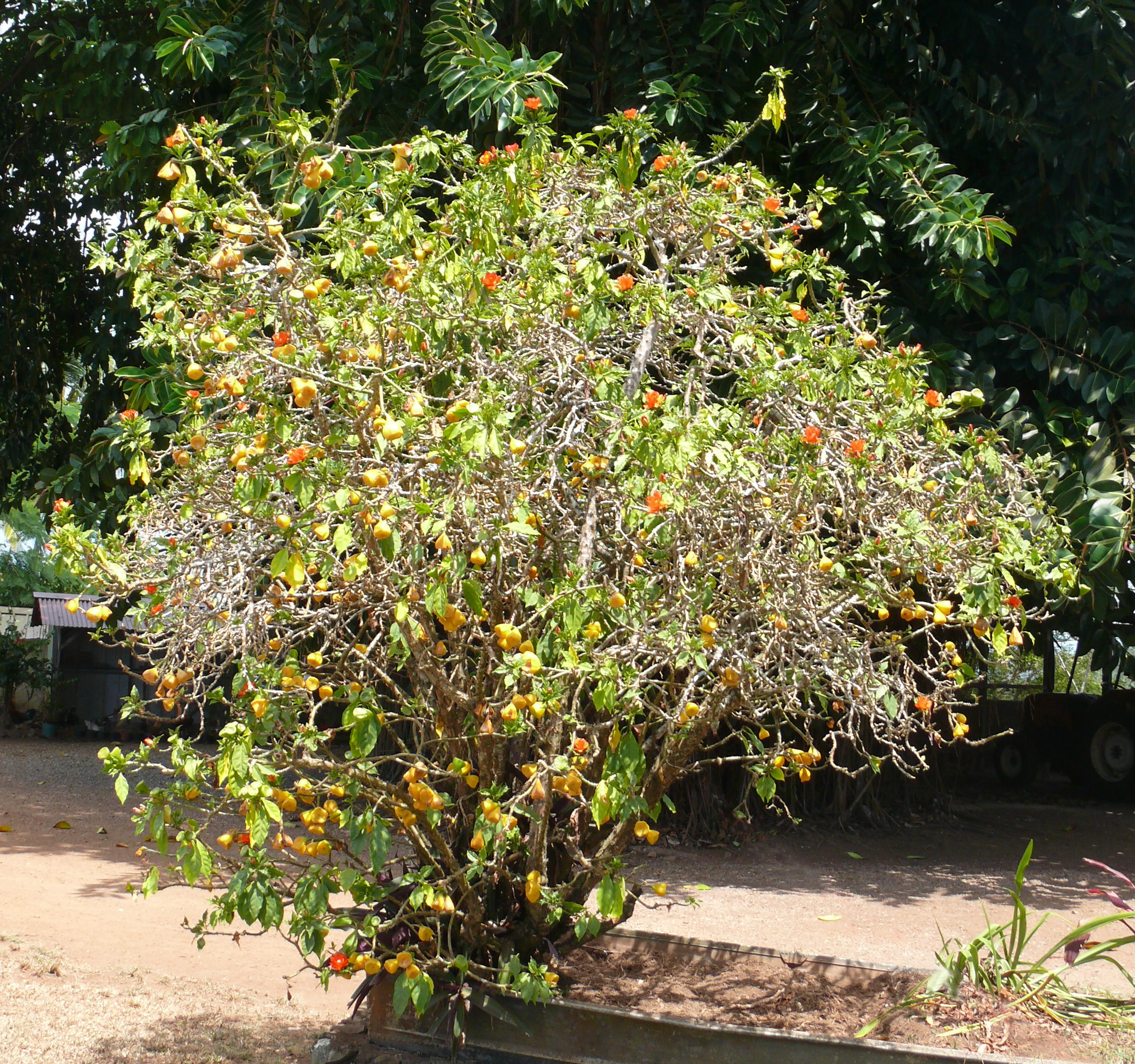
- Leuenbergeria bleo

Scientific classification
- Kingdom: Plantae
- Clade: Tracheophytes
- Clade: Angiosperms
- Clade: Eudicots
- Order: Caryophyllales
- Family: Cactaceae
- Subfamily: Leuenbergerioideae; Mayta & Mol.Nov.
- Genus: Leuenbergeria; Lodé

Type species
- Leuenbergeria quisqueyana

= Leuenbergeria =

Genus of cacti

Leuenbergeria is a genus of flowering plant in the family Cactaceae, mostly native around the Caribbean. Unlike most cacti, it has persistent leaves and develops bark on its stems early in its growth. The genus was created in 2012 by Joël Lodé. Before the creation of Leuenbergeria as a genus, the species within it were included in a broadly circumscribed genus, Pereskia. Leuenbergeria is the only genus in the subfamily Leuenbergerioideae.

== Description ==
Species of Leuenbergeria grow as trees or shrubs, up to 10 m (33 ft) in the case of L. lychnidiflora. They differ from most cacti in having leaves even when mature – as also do species of Pereskia and Rhodocactus, with which Leuenbergeria species were once united in a single genus. Leuenbergeria differs from those other genera in that the stems of Leuenbergeria species form bark at an early stage in their growth and do not have stomata, preventing them from acting as organs of photosynthesis. Like other cacti, they have areoles bearing spines. In most species, the areoles also bear leaves. Their flowers are mostly pink, orange or red, although some species have yellow flowers.

== Taxonomy ==
Joël Lodé created the genus Leuenbergeria in 2012. The name honours the Swiss botanist Beat Ernst Leuenberger. The genus Pereskia was previously broadly defined so that it included Leuenbergeria. Molecular phylogenetic studies suggested that there were three clades within Pereskia when circumscribed in this way. Leuenbergeria was created for the "Northern clade". By 2016, all three clades were recognized as separate genera. A consensus cladogram from a 2005 study is shown below with the more recent generic assignments added. It shows that the three genera are basal to the rest of the cacti.

- Cactaceae
  - Leuenbergeria
  - - - Pereskia s.s.
      - Rhodocactus
    - core cacti

Leuenbergeria has been placed as the only genus in the subfamily Leuenbergerioideae.

Within the genus, a 2005 molecular phylogenetic study suggested the species were related as shown in the following cladogram. The position of the ovary appears to have some phylogenetic significance. The sister species L. aureiflora and L. guamacho are the only two with yellow flowers.

- - L. lychnidiflora
  - - - L. guamacho
      - L. aureiflora
    - - L. bleo
      - - L. quisqueyana
        - - L. zinniflora
          - - L. portulacifolia
            - L. marcanoi

=== Species ===
As of May 2019, Plants of the World Online accepted eight species:

Image	Scientific name	Distribution
	Leuenbergeria aureiflora (F.Ritter) Lodé	eastern Brazil
	Leuenbergeria bleo (Kunth) Lodé	Panama and Colombia
	Leuenbergeria guamacho (F.A.C.Weber) Lodé	S. Caribbean, N. Colombia to Venezuela
	Leuenbergeria lychnidiflora (DC.) Lodé	Mexico (Guerrero, Oaxaca) to Central America
	Leuenbergeria marcanoi (Areces) Lodé	Hispaniola (Dominican Republic)
	Leuenbergeria portulacifolia (L.) Lodé	Hispaniola (Haiti)
	Leuenbergeria quisqueyana (Alain) Lodé	Hispaniola (Dominican Republic)
	Leuenbergeria zinniiflora (DC.) Lodé	Cuba

== Distribution ==
Leuenbergeria has a discontinuous distribution. Most species are native to southwest Mexico and around the Caribbean, in both the West Indies and northern South America. L. aureiflora is the exception, being found in eastern Brazil.
