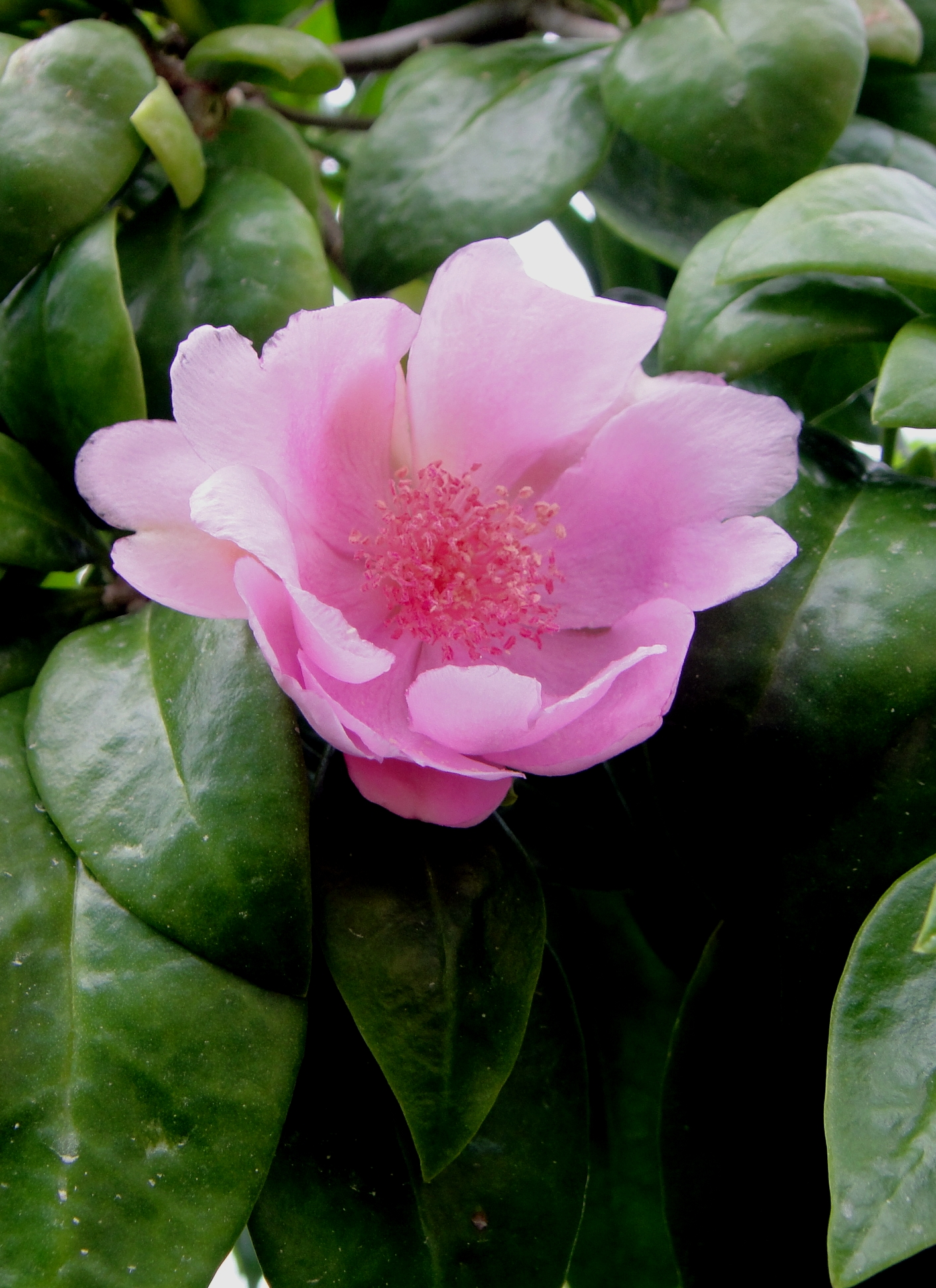

Conservation status
- Critically Endangered (IUCN 3.1)

Scientific classification
- Kingdom: Plantae
- Clade: Tracheophytes
- Clade: Angiosperms
- Clade: Eudicots
- Order: Caryophyllales
- Family: Cactaceae
- Genus: Leuenbergeria
- Species: L. quisqueyana

Binomial name
- Leuenbergeria quisqueyana (Alain) Lodé

Synonyms
- Pereskia quisqueyana Alain

= Leuenbergeria quisqueyana =

Species of cactus

Leuenbergeria quisqueyana is a species of flowering plant in the family Cactaceae. It is sometimes referred to by the common name Bayahibe rose, and is endemic to the Caribbean island of Hispaniola, in the Dominican Republic.

== Taxonomy ==
The species was discovered by the French botanist Henri Alain Liogier in 1977 as Pereskia quisqueyana, the description being published in 1980. He named it quisqueyana, in honor of the Dominican Republic, which is also referred to natively as Quisqueya.

== Description ==
Leuenbergeria quisqueyana is a dioecious cactus that resembles a shrub and reaches up to 6 metres (20 ft) in height. Its trunk is surrounded by groups of spines which erupt in bunches. Its succulent leaves are elliptical in shape and are a bright green color. The flower of L. quisqueyana is pink in color and blooms from the ends of its branches. Its fruits are yellow and contain black seeds.

== Distribution and habitat ==
L. quisqueyana is one of only several cactus species which possess leaves. Its natural habitat includes Hispaniolan dry forests that are found on the southeastern coast of Hispaniola, particularly around the town of Bayahibe, its namesake. It is critically endangered due to habitat loss.

== National symbol ==
Law 146-11 of the Dominican Republic established the Bayahibe rose as the national flower of the country and ensured its protection due to its endangered status.
