= Chivela Pass =

Narrow mountain pass in the Sierra Madre Mountains

- Location within Mexico Location within Oaxaca
- Elevation: 224 metres (735 ft)
- Traversed by: Mexican Federal Highway 185; Tren Interoceánico

Third Approach
- Location: Istmo de Tehuantepec, Asunción Ixtaltepec, Oaxaca, Mexico
- Range: Sierra Madre de Oaxaca; Sierra Madre de Chiapas
- Coordinates: 16.724°N 94.997°W

The Chivela Pass is a narrow mountain pass in the Sierra Madre Mountains that funnels cooler, drier air from the North American continent, through southern Mexico, into the Pacific. These northeasterly winds, specifically the Tehuano wind, blows periodically across the Isthmus of Tehuantepec in southern Mexico, and offshore over hundreds of miles of the Pacific Ocean. The wind activity forces the upwelling of colder subsurface waters. This strong upwelling brings nutrients from the subsurface layers of the ocean, thereby enhancing the fertility of the offshore waters. This results in strong plankton growth which in turn supports a more bountiful fishery in the region.

In extreme circumstances during the winter, truly cold, dense air occasionally flows from the Bay of Campeche in the Gulf of Mexico through the Chivela Pass into the Gulf of Tehuantepec on the Pacific side. These winds can be strong enough to sandblast paint off ships in near-coastal waters.
