= Israel D. Andrews =

American diplomat and lobbyist (1813-1871)

Consul-General of the United States to the British North American Provinces
- In office 1855 – July 11, 1857
- President: Franklin Pierce; James Buchanan

Personal details
- Born: May 1813 Eastport, Maine, U.S. or Campobello Island, New Brunswick, Canada
- Died: February 17, 1871 (aged 57) Boston, Massachusetts, U.S.
- Occupation: Diplomat; lobbyist

Israel De Wolfe Andrews (May 1813 – February 17, 1871) was an American diplomat and political lobbyist. Originally a trader on the American frontier, he became a consul for the United States in New Brunswick and the Province of Canada, before serving as consul-general of the United States to the British North American Provinces from 1855 until his termination in 1857. He lobbied for trade between the United States and the British colonies to the north, and was instrumental in the ratification of the Canadian–American Reciprocity Treaty.

== Biography ==
Israel De Wolfe Andrews was born in May 1813; it is debatable if he was born in Eastport, Maine, or on Campobello Island, New Brunswick, but he was raised in the former town. His parents were Elizabeth DeWolf and Israel Andrews, the latter of whose own father had emigrated from Danvers, Massachusetts, to Nova Scotia. Reginald C. Stuart remarked that despite a lack of information on his schooling, it is known that Andrews was "a clear, persuasive writer at ease with statistical data, and he moved easily in the journalistic, commercial, and political circles of his time".

Andrews worked as a trader on the American frontier, with most of his goods "consist[ing] more or less of smuggling", and he was inspired to go into American-British North American trade by such experiences with foreign trade. In March 1843, he was appointed the United States consul in Saint John, New Brunswick. As consul, he lobbied for the promotion of trade between the United States and British North America in the hopes that the territory would become a part of the United States, often lobbying the country's Secretaries of State to reduce trade barriers such as tariffs and to promote reciprocal trade. In 1849, he received the position of consul to New Brunswick and the Province of Canada, which saw him work in Halifax, Saint John, and Montreal. He was also hired as an agent to obtain commercial intelligence involving the country's trade with British North America, and his reports accumulated within the Department of State and the Treasury. Stuart reported that within a few years, he received recognition from several United States officials "as an expert on virtually all aspects of British North America".

Andrews's work included the Canadian–American Reciprocity Treaty, which was instrumental to the growth of free trade with the United States. He had been lobbying the federal government for the demands behind the treaty as early as 1848, and he was present at the 1853 negotiations to delineate the treaty between Secretary of State William L. Marcy and British minister to the United States Sir John Crampton, 2nd Baronet. He subsequently lobbied magazine and newspaper contributors, Northeastern businesspeople, and eventually U.S. senators to garner support for the treaty's ratification. Stuart remarked that Andrews was "the first American to develop, articulate, and promote a coherent U.S. policy toward Canada", and that he was instrumental in the Anglo-Saxon Union and commercial expansionism movements; Hecht said that based on his work on the treaty, Andrews "was a continentalist who believed that geography had created two great outlets, the Mississippi and the St Lawrence, for the heartland of North America". James Buchanan offered Andrews to work as an attaché after he became minister to the United Kingdom, though the latter declined.

In 1855, Andrews was appointed consul-general of the United States to the British North American Provinces. However, he was accused of planning to embezzle campaign finances intended for John C. Frémont's 1856 presidential bid, dealing a blow to his bid to support Nathaniel P. Banks's campaign for speaker of the United States House of Representatives. Andrews, who had a history of lavish spending inside and outside of lobbying for the Reciprocity Treaty, was frequently arrested and held on bail for unpaid debts amidst declining health. A Boston Board of Trade committee petitioned the president in 1856 to have Congress pay off the $132,000 he was known to owe, and the Senate petitioned the Secretary of State in 1858 to reimburse the debts; that ultimately did not happen. James Buchanan, by then U.S. president, fired Andrews, who had rarely even visited the Provinces, for dereliction of duty, and Andrews's tenure as consul-general ended on July 11, 1857.

After his termination, Andrews remained in political lobbying, particularly specializing in the interests of the Reciprocity Treaty. Despite his territorial ambitions, he once assured the pro-slavery Southern senators that the Reciprocity Treaty would not result in the provinces becoming U.S. territory, let alone for free states.

Following a history of alcoholism, Andrews died on February 17, 1871, in the Boston City Hospital. Some of Andrews's correspondence is preserved in the papers of Buchanan, Lord Elgin, and Marcy.
