= Bulk Richardson number =

The Bulk Richardson Number (BRN) is an approximation of the Gradient Richardson number. The BRN is a dimensionless ratio in meteorology related to the consumption of turbulence divided by the shear production (the generation of turbulence kinetic energy caused by wind shear) of turbulence. It is used to show dynamic stability and the formation of turbulence.

The BRN is used frequently in meteorology due to widely available radiosonde data and numerical weather forecasts that supply wind and temperature measurements at discrete points in space.

== Formula ==
Below is the formula for the BRN, where g is gravitational acceleration, T_{v} is absolute virtual temperature, Δθ_{v} is the virtual potential temperature difference across a layer of thickness, Δz is vertical depth, and ΔU and ΔV are the changes in horizontal wind components across that same layer.

$$R_{B} = \frac{(g/T_{v})\Delta\theta_{v}\Delta z}{(\Delta U)^2 + (\Delta V)^{2}}$$

== Critical values and interpretation ==
High values indicate unstable and/or weakly-sheared environments; low values indicate weak instability and/or strong vertical shear. Generally, values in the range of around 10 to 50 suggest environmental conditions favorable for supercell development.

In the limit of layer thickness becoming small, the Bulk Richardson number approaches the Gradient Richardson number, for which a critical Richardson number is roughly Ri_{c}= 0.25. Numbers less than this critical value are dynamically unstable and likely to become or remain turbulent.

The critical value of 0.25 applies only for local gradients, not for finite differences across thick layers. The thicker the layer is the more likely we are to average out large gradients that occur within small sub-regions of the layer of interest. This results in uncertainty of our prediction of the occurrence of turbulence, and now one must use an artificially large value of the critical Richardson number to give reasonable results using our smoothed gradients. This means that the thinner the layer, the closer the value to the theory.

== See also ==
- Monin–Obukhov length
- Richardson number
- Atmospheric dynamics
- Atmospheric thermodynamics
