= Košava (wind) =

Serbian climatic wind streams

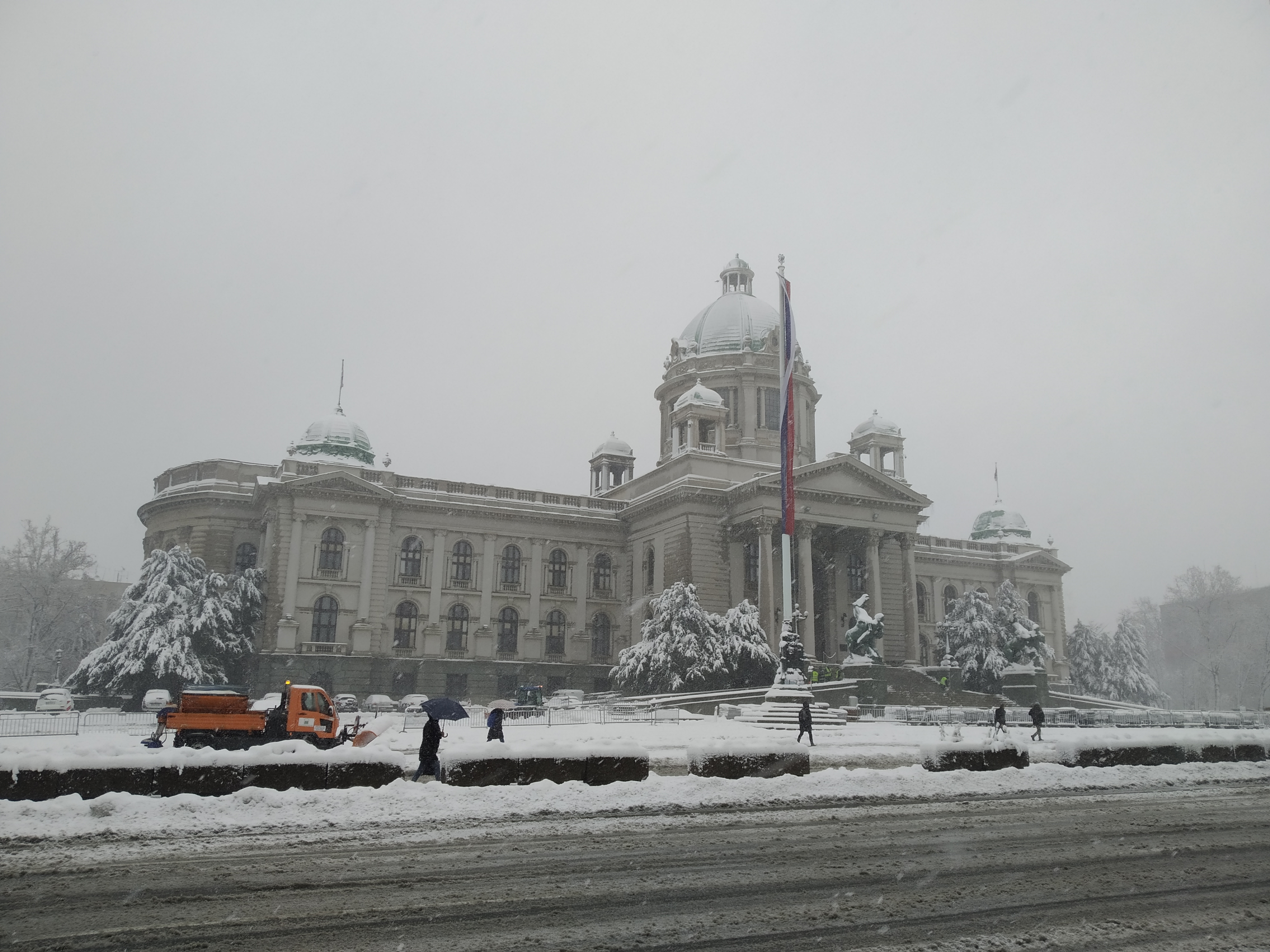
The National Assembly of Serbia under heavy snow

Košava (Serbian Cyrillic: Кошава, pronounced [kɔ̌ʃaʋa]) is a cold, very squally southeastern wind found in parts of Eastern Europe and the Balkans. It starts in the Carpathian Mountains and follows the Danube northwest through the Iron Gate region where it gains a jet effect, then continues to Belgrade. It can spread as far north as Hungary and as far south as Niš and Sofia.

In the winter, it can cause temperatures to drop to around −30 °C (−22 °F). In the summer, it is cool and dusty. It varies diurnally, and is strongest between 5:00 and 10:00 in the morning. Košava is usually caused by a low pressure zone over the Adriatic Sea and a corresponding high pressure zone in southern Russia.

The name is also used traditionally in northwestern Bulgaria to mean a northeastern or eastern wind. There is a saying that goes: "When košava blows, the Nišava freezes".

The speed and occurrence of the Košava wind declined from 1949 to 2010. The same study showed that Košava usually lasts for two or three days, one-day events being very rare.

Košava wind blows when there is a high air pressure (an anticyclone) over Eastern Europe and/or west Asia and a low pressure (a cyclone) over the middle and/or western Mediterranean region. The strong anticyclone, however, is the main trigger for the Košava wind. Košava is also a gap flow windstorm. Košava's occurrence can be successfully forecast using the across-mountain mean sea level pressure and potential temperature differences.

== See also ==
- Katabatic wind
