= Mountain-gap wind =

A mountain-gap wind, gap wind or gap flow is a local wind blowing through a gap between mountains.

Gap winds are low-level winds and can be associated with strong winds of 20-40 knots and on occasion exceeding 50 knots. Gap winds are generally strongest close to gap exit.

Example flows include the surface winds blowing through the Strait of Gibraltar – one of the strongest winds in this region is called Levanter. Similar winds occur at other gaps in mountain ranges, such as the tehuantepecer and the jochwinde, and in long channels, such as the Strait of Juan de Fuca between the Olympic Mountains of Washington and Vancouver Island, British Columbia, Hinlopen Strait near Spitsbergen. In the Columbia River Gorge on the border of Washington and Oregon, the high frequency of gap winds has led to the installation of wind farms, and the large amount of wind surfing that takes place on the Columbia River.

Another example is the Koshava wind in Serbia that blows along the Danube River. The South Carpathian Mountains and Balkan Mountains are channelling the flow into the Danube River basin in Romania and the exiting jet at the Iron Gates is known as the Koshava wind. The main characteristics of the Koshava wind are its high wind speed, southeasterly direction, persistence, and gustiness.

More generally, corridor winds affect the local climate of a region (south of France), as well as vegetation. They are also vectors of violent fires in the affected areas. The resulting gusts can reach more than 100 km/h and cause property damage.

== See also ==
- Wind gap (geographical feature)
- Valley exit jet
