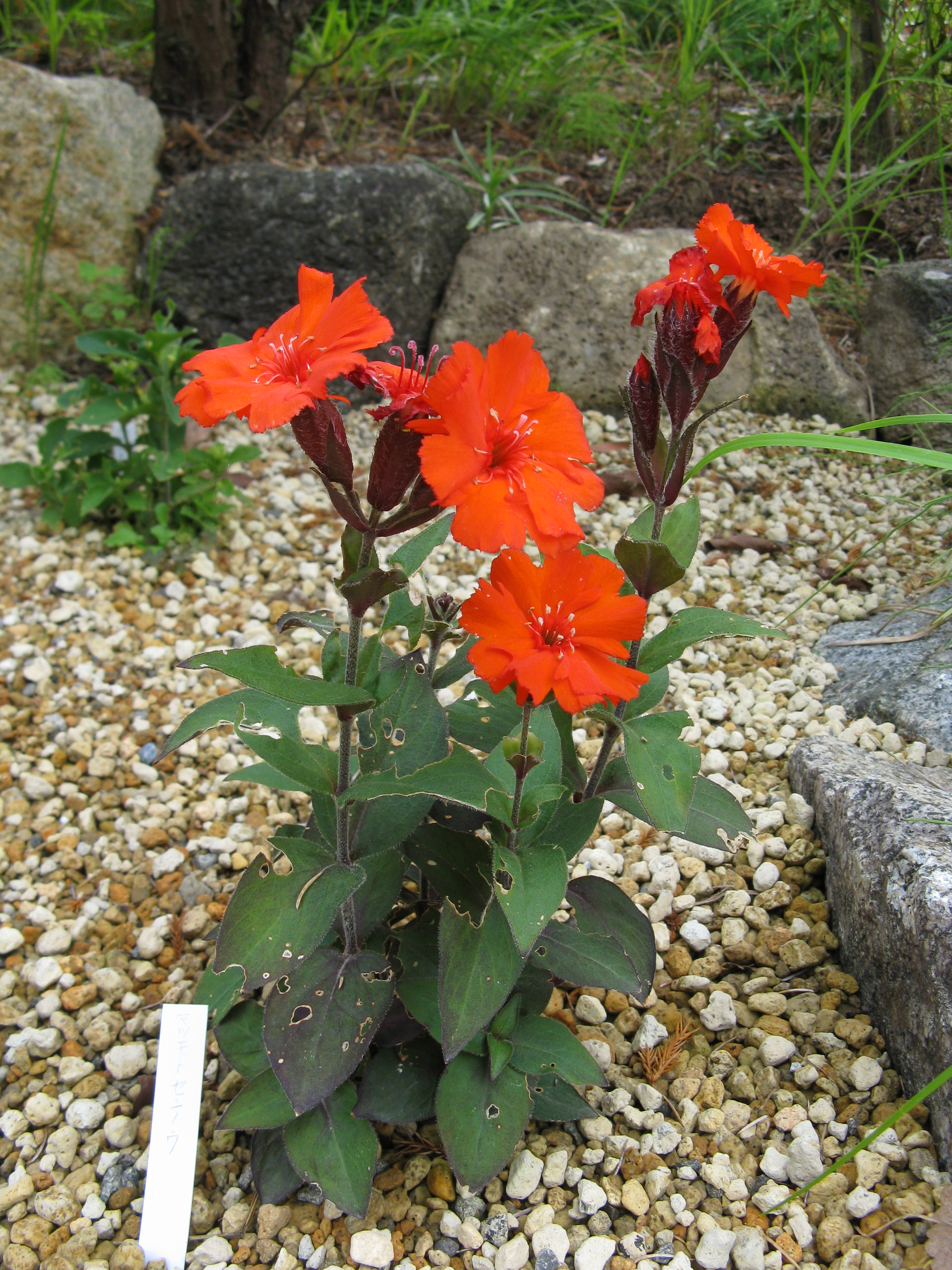
- At Osaka Prefectural Flowers Garden

Scientific classification
- Kingdom: Plantae
- Clade: Tracheophytes
- Clade: Angiosperms
- Clade: Eudicots
- Order: Caryophyllales
- Family: Caryophyllaceae
- Genus: Silene
- Species: S. banksia

Binomial name
- Silene banksia (Meerb.) Mabb.

Synonyms
- List: Agrostemma banksia Meerb.; Agrostemma bungeanum D.Don; Agrostemma fulgens (Fisch. ex Spreng.) Döll; Agrostemma grandiflorum (Jacq.) Döll; Exemix grandiflora Raf.; Hedona sinensis Lour.; Lychnis bungeana Fisch. ex Lindl.; Lychnis coccinea Salisb.; Lychnis coronata Thunb.; Lychnis coronata var. verticillata Makino; Lychnis fulgens Fisch. ex Spreng.; Lychnis fulgens f. glabra (Nakai) W.Lee; Lychnis grandiflora Jacq.; Lychnis haageana Benary ex Lem.; Lychnis senno Siebold & Zucc.; Lychnis sieboldii Van Houtte ex Planch.; Lychnis speciosa Carrière; Silene banksia f. verticillata (Makino) Yonek.; Silene bungeana (D.Don) H.Ohashi & H.Nakai; Silene fulgens (Fisch. ex Spreng.) E.H.L.Krause; Silene ganpi H.Ohba & S.Akiyama; Silene grandiflora (Jacq.) H.Ohashi & H.Nakai; Silene senno (Siebold & Zucc.) S.Akiyama; Silene sieboldii (Van Houtte ex Planch.) H.Ohashi & H.Nakai; Silene sinensis (Lour.) H.Ohashi & H.Nakai; Silene sinensis f. verticillata (Makino) H.Ohashi & H.Nakai

= Silene banksia =

Species of plant in the carnation family

Silene banksia (syn. Silene sieboldii) is a species of flowering plant in the family Caryophyllaceae. It is native to southeastern Siberia, most of China, and North Korea, and it has been introduced to Mongolia and Japan. The species goes by the common names Chinese lychnis and jian chun luo. It is a cultigen, domesticated in northeast Asia (almost certainly in China) at some time on the distant past. No wild individuals are known.
