= Isthmus of Tehuantepec =

Shortest distance between the Gulf of Mexico and Pacific Ocean

Coordinates: 17.2°N 94.7°W

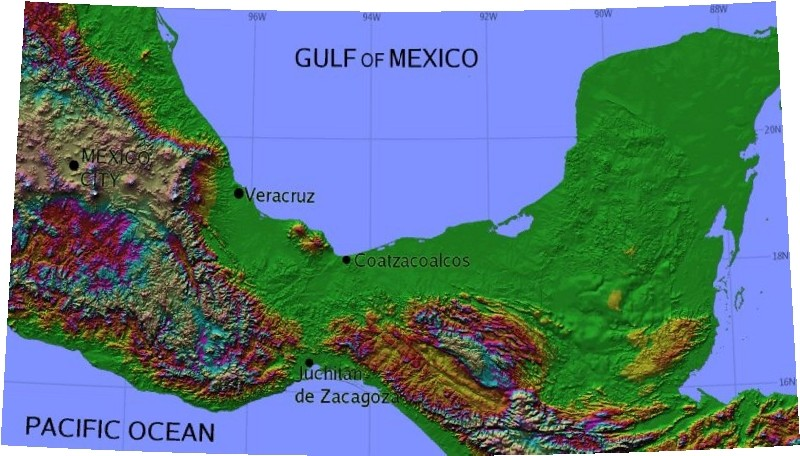
Map showing the relief of the isthmus

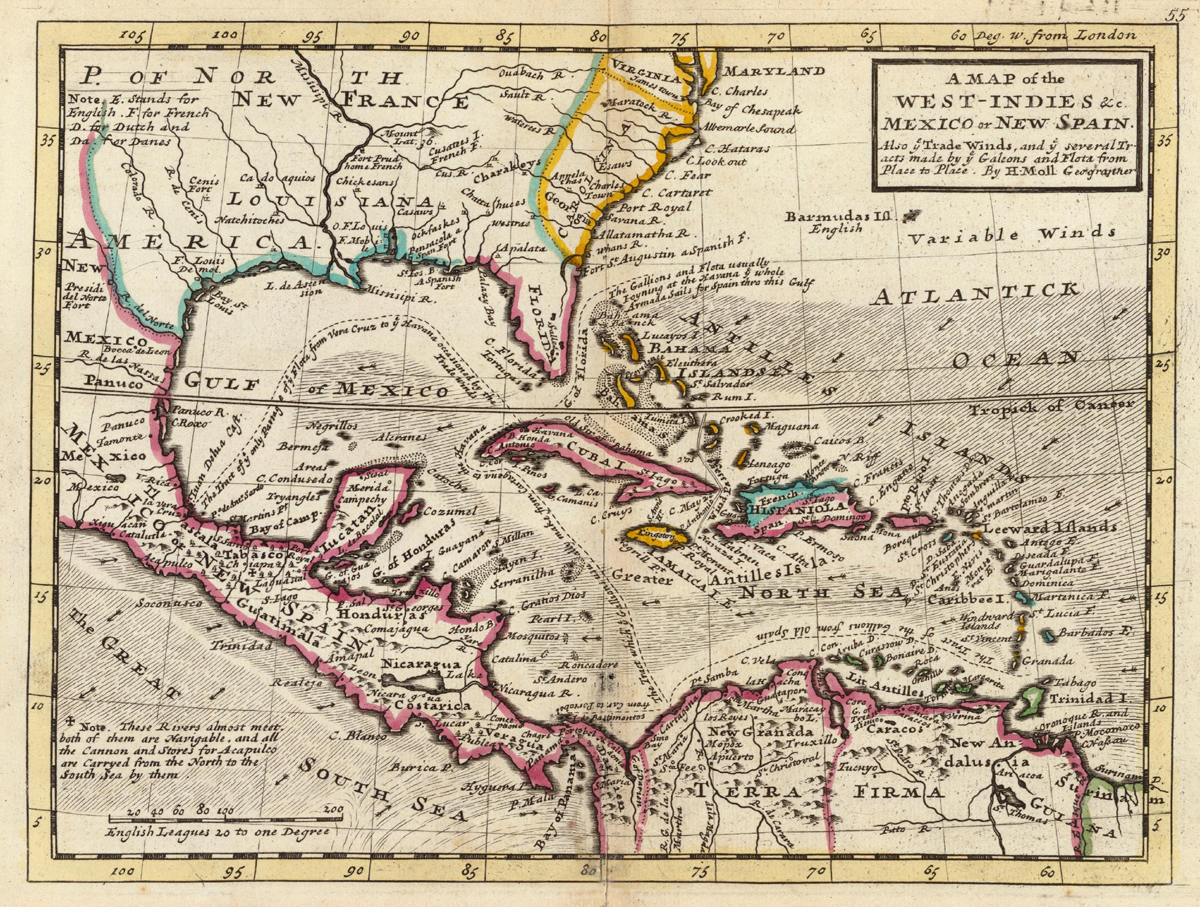
1736 map. Caption at lower left: "These rivers almost meet. both of them are Navigable, and all the Cannon and Stores for Acapulco are Carryed from the North to the South Sea by them."

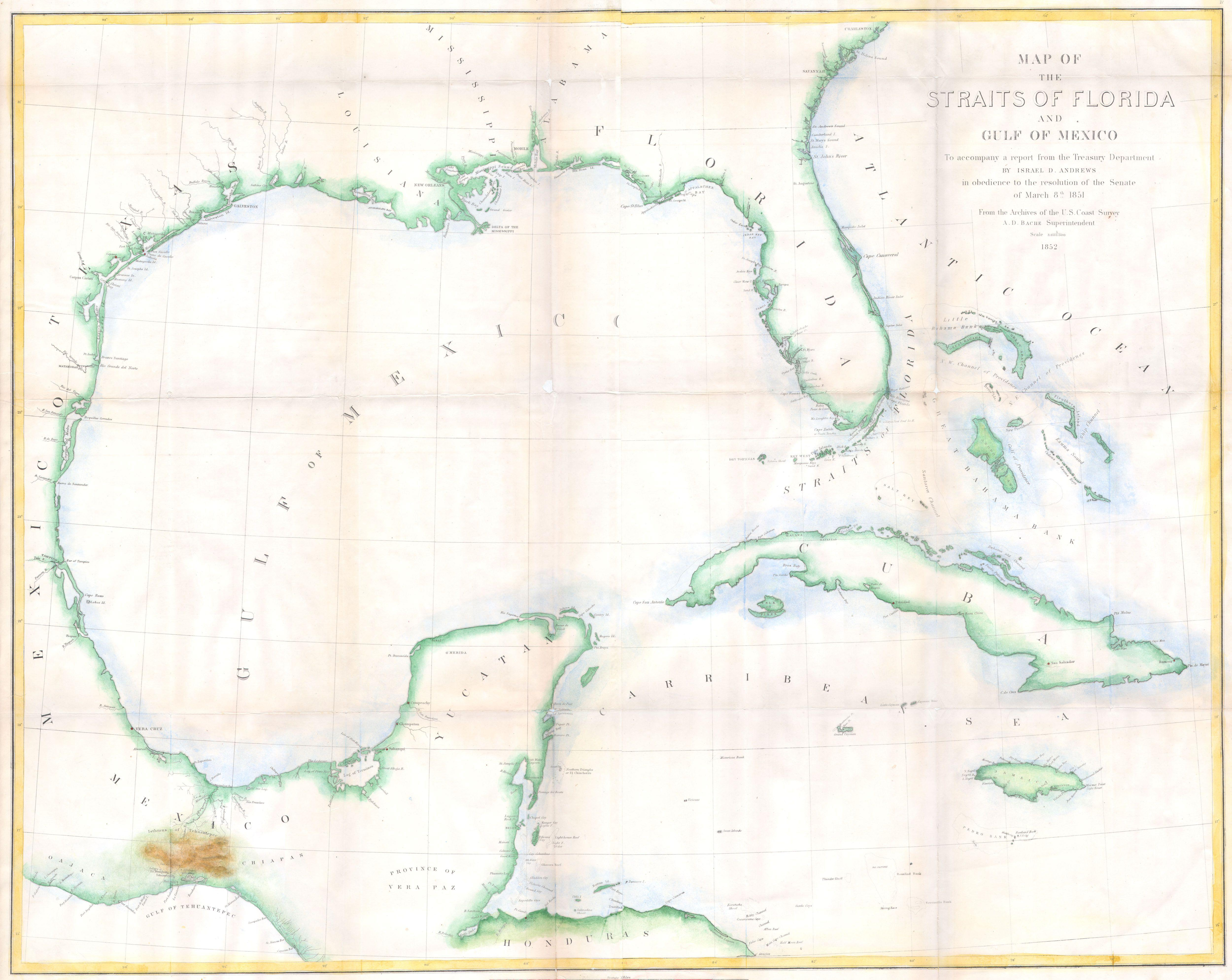
Map of the Straits of Florida and Gulf of Mexico. To accompany a report from the U.S. Treasury Department to the U.S. Senate by Israel D. Andrews, per the resolution of the Senate of March 8, 1851.

The Isthmus of Tehuantepec (Spanish pronunciation: [tewanteˈpek]) is an isthmus in Mexico. It represents the shortest distance between the Gulf of Mexico and the Pacific Ocean, thereby also making it the natural border between North America and Central America, especially to those who classify the two as mutually exclusive. Before the opening of the Panama Canal, it was a major overland transport route known simply as the Tehuantepec Route. The name is taken from the town of Santo Domingo Tehuantepec in the state of Oaxaca; this was derived from the Nahuatl term Tēcuāntepēc ("jaguar mountain").

== Geography ==
The isthmus includes the part of Mexico lying between the 94th and 96th meridians west longitude, or the southeastern parts of Veracruz and Oaxaca, including small areas of Chiapas and Tabasco. The states of Tabasco and Chiapas are east of the isthmus, with Veracruz and Oaxaca on the west.

At its narrowest point, the isthmus is 200 km (124 mi) across from gulf to gulf, or 192 km (119 mi) to the head of Laguna Superior on the Pacific coast. The Sierra Madre del Sur mountain range breaks down at this point into a broad, plateau-like ridge, whose elevation, at the highest point reached by the Ferrocarril Transistmico railway at Chivela Pass, is 224 m (735 ft). The northern side of the isthmus is swampy and densely covered with jungle, which has been a greater obstacle to railway construction than the grades in crossing the sierra.

The Selva Zoque in the eastern-central region of the isthmus is an area of great ecological importance, the largest remaining area of tropical rainforest in Mexico and holding the majority of the terrestrial biodiversity in Mexico.

The Sierra Madre de Oaxaca mountains flatten to form Chivela Pass before the Sierra Madre de Chiapas mountains resume to the south, so geographically the isthmus divides North America from Central America. The southern edge of the North American tectonic plate lies across the Motagua Fault in Guatemala, so geologically, the division between North America and Central America (on the Caribbean Plate) is much farther south than the isthmus of Tehuantepec.

=== History ===
The Isthmus of Tehuantepec, a region located in the south of Mexico, is the narrowest area between the Atlantic and Pacific oceans in the whole country. Only 220 kilometers separate the two oceans between the gulfs of Mexico and Tehuantepec. During the first half of the 16th century, it seemed as if nature could not withstand the strenuous effort of the Spanish conquistadores to find, within the tropics, a strait connecting the two oceans. This meant that in the conquest explorations during the 16th century, this region was used as an interoceanic passage. The exploration of this region between the 'North Sea' and the 'South Sea' was, since the conquest of Mesoamerica, a fixed idea of the Spanish monarchy and its representatives. Charles V made this project one of the priority missions of the explorers whose objective was to put the kingdom of New Spain in communication with that of Peru. Hernán Cortés, in 1520, used this route to transport equipment and supplies across the isthmus from the Gulf of Mexico to his shipyard located on the Pacific coast, near the town of Santo Domingo de Tehuantepec. The advantage lay in the ability to make a good part of the journey by river. Approximately two-thirds of the Isthmus is crossed by the Coatzacoalcos River, which is navigable for approximately 200 kilometers. Cortés saw this river as a means of fluvial communication across the Isthmus itself. During the last third of the 16th century, Spanish expeditions arrived at the port of Veracruz, in the Gulf of Mexico, and from there they moved by boat to the mouth of the Coatzacoalcos River. The materials necessary to build ships in the shipyards located along the Pacific coast were loaded together with artillery into shallow canoes and brought upstream. They were subsequently transported on the backs of indigenous people from the sources of the Coatzacoalcos River to the Gulf of Tehuantepec on the Pacific coast. Many of these expeditions later moved along the coast to the port of Acapulco from where they sailed along the western coast of North America and then set off westwards, seeking a passage to the Philippines and southern China. The advantages of this itinerary would lead to the proposal, as early as the 16th century, of an interoceanic canal. However, a series of difficulties caused the most feasible option, Panama, to eclipse Tehuantepec as an interoceanic passage.

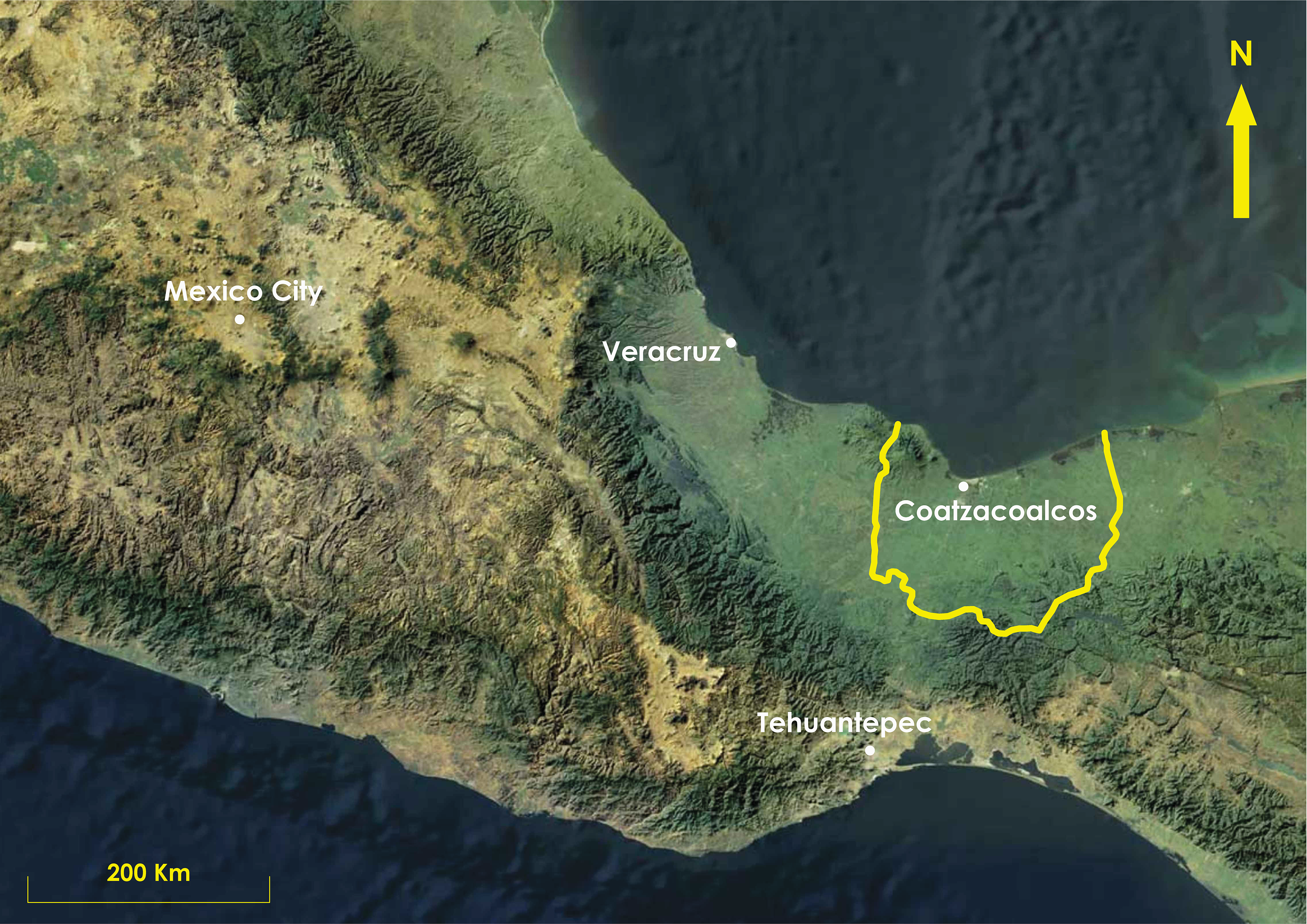
Location of the Province of Coatzacoalcos in a modern satellite image. This indicates the settlements of Coatzacoalcos and Tehuantepec, where Gali also made a map for the Relaciónes Geográficas. Image prepared by Morato-Moreno, M.

=== Biogeography ===
The Isthmus of Tehuantepec, a valley otherwise surrounded by montane habitats, has also been noted as an important biogeographical barrier among montane taxa, such as Mexican birds. Population diversification has been observed among not only avian fauna, but other organisms as well, including toads and the Central American river turtle. As a result, the Isthmus presents a case of allopatric speciation wherein a geographic divide gives rise to population divergence and a significant decrease in gene flow.

=== Climate ===
The predominant climates in the region are tropical savanna (primarily in the south) and tropical monsoon (primarily in the north). There are also small central areas with a temperate climate due to elevation. The annual rainfall on the Atlantic or northern slope is 3,960 mm (156 in) and the maximum temperature about 35 °C (95 °F) in the shade. The Pacific slope has a light rainfall and dryer climate.

External image
- Oaxaca Wind Resource Map

The narrowness of the isthmus, and the gap in the Sierra Madre, allow the trade winds from the Gulf of Mexico to blow through to the Pacific. Normally, these winds are not particularly strong, but periodically, a surge of denser air originating from the North American continent will send strong winds through the Chivela Pass and out over the Gulf of Tehuantepec on the Pacific coast. This wind is known as the Tehuano. The region has one of the best wind resources in Mexico, with several wind farms.

== People and culture ==
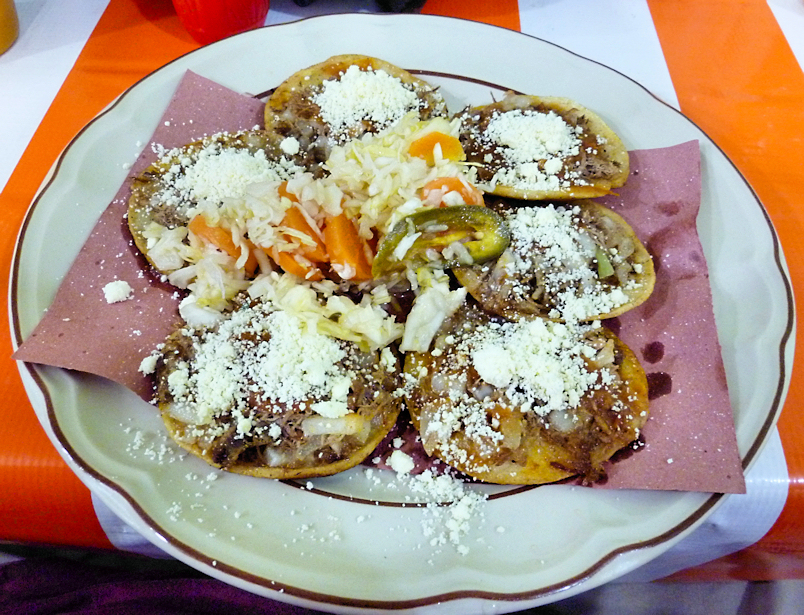
Garnachas

In the Oaxaca half of Tehuantepec, the population is composed mostly of indigenous Zapotec peoples. The women are the traders in the Oaxacan Tehuantepec area and do little menial work. Known as "Tehuanas", these women are known throughout Mexico for their colorful dresses, assertive personalities, and relatively equal relations with men, leading some to characterize them as "matriarchal."

=== Cuisine ===
Dishes may range from simple to elaborate; most dishes incorporate maize and moles. Common items include tamales made with iguana, chicken, beef or armadillo; guetabingui (fried balls of rice and shrimp); garnachas topped with dried queso Oaxaca; and pozol, a maize-based drink.

== Tehuantepec route ==
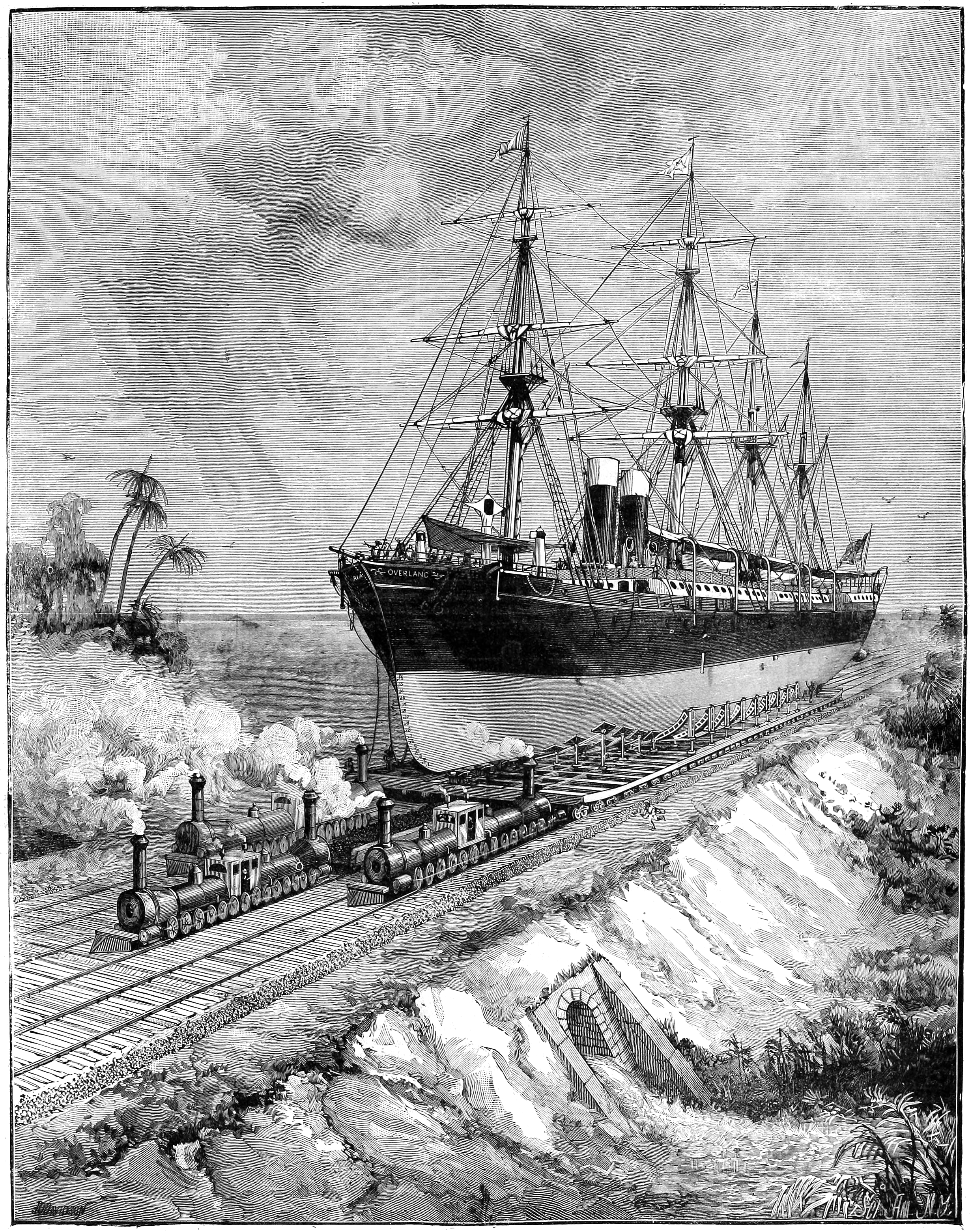
19th century illustration of the proposed "Interoceanic Ship Railway"

Since the days of Hernán Cortés, the Tehuantepec isthmus has been considered a favorable route, first for an interoceanic canal, and since the 19th century for an interoceanic railway. Its proximity to the axis of international trade gives it some advantage over the Panama route. But the Isthmus of Panama is narrower, making for a shorter traversal, even if the canal is farther from trade routes.

The 1854 Gadsden Purchase treaty included a provision allowing the U.S. to transport mail and trade goods across the Isthmus of Tehuantepec via a plank road and railroad. The 1859 McLane–Ocampo Treaty, which Benito Juárez signed but was never ratified by the United States Congress, would have given the U.S. extensive transit rights along the same route.

While the idea of a canal across the isthmus failed to gain momentum due to the enormous cost of such a project, engineer James B. Eads proposed to construct a quadruple track ship-railway, and the scheme received serious attention for some time. Then came projects for an ordinary railway, and several concessions were granted by the Mexican government for this purpose from 1857 to 1882. In the latter year the Mexican government resolved to undertake the railroad construction on its own account, and entered into contracts with a prominent Mexican contractor for the work. In 1888 this contract was rescinded, after 108 km (67 mi) of road had been completed.

The next contract was fruitless because of the death of the contractor, and the third failed to complete the work within the sum specified (£2,700,000). This was in 1893, and 60 km (37 mi) remained to be built. A fourth contract resulted in the completion of the 130-mile line from coast to coast in 1894. But, it was found that the terminal ports were deficient in facilities and the railroad was too light for heavy traffic.

The government then entered into a contract with the London firm of contractors of S. Pearson & Son, Ltd., who had constructed the drainage works of the valley of Mexico and the new port works of Veracruz, to rebuild the line and construct terminal ports at Coatzacoalcos on the Gulf coast, and at Salina Cruz on the Pacific side. The work was done for account of the Mexican government. Work began on 10 December 1899, and was finished to a point where its formal opening for traffic was possible in January 1907.

=== Tehuantepec railway line ===
The Tehuantepec railway (now the Ferrocarril Transístmico ("Trans-Isthmic Railroad")), is 308 km (191 mi) long, running from the port of Coatzacoalcos on the Gulf of Mexico to Salina Cruz in Oaxaca on the Pacific coast, with a branch of 29 km (18 mi) between Juile and San Juan Evangelista. The minimum depth at low water in both ports is 10 m (33 ft). An extensive system of quays and railway tracks at both terminals affords ample facilities for the expeditious handling of heavy cargoes. The general offices and repair shops of the original Tehuantepec Railway were located at Rincón Antonio, at the entrance to the Chivela Pass. At Santa Lucrecia, 175 km (109 mi) from Salina Cruz, connection was made with the Veracruz & Pacific Railway, 343 km (213 mi) to Córdoba, Veracruz, and 500 km (310 mi) to Mexico City. Those connecting lines are now owned and operated by Ferrosur, a company that also operates along the Ferroistmo-owned Tuehantepec line.

Several proposals have been made for modernizing the inter-ocean rail connection. In 2019, as part of the Isthmus of Tehuantepec Development Plan, a project has been taking place since June of that year to create a communication link between the Pacific and Atlantic Oceans through the Tehuantepec Railway and the ports of Salina Cruz and Coatzacoalcos, known as the Interoceanic Corridor of the Isthmus of Tehuantepec. Recent reports state that this corridor will be fully operational by December 2023.

== See also ==
- American-Hawaiian Steamship Company
- Ferrocarril de Veracruz al Istmo
- Istmo de Tehuantepec, Oaxaca
- Isthmus of Panama is the site of the Panama Canal
- Mexican Federal Highway 185
- Nicaragua Canal
