= Gulf of Tehuantepec =

Body of water on the southern coast of Mexico

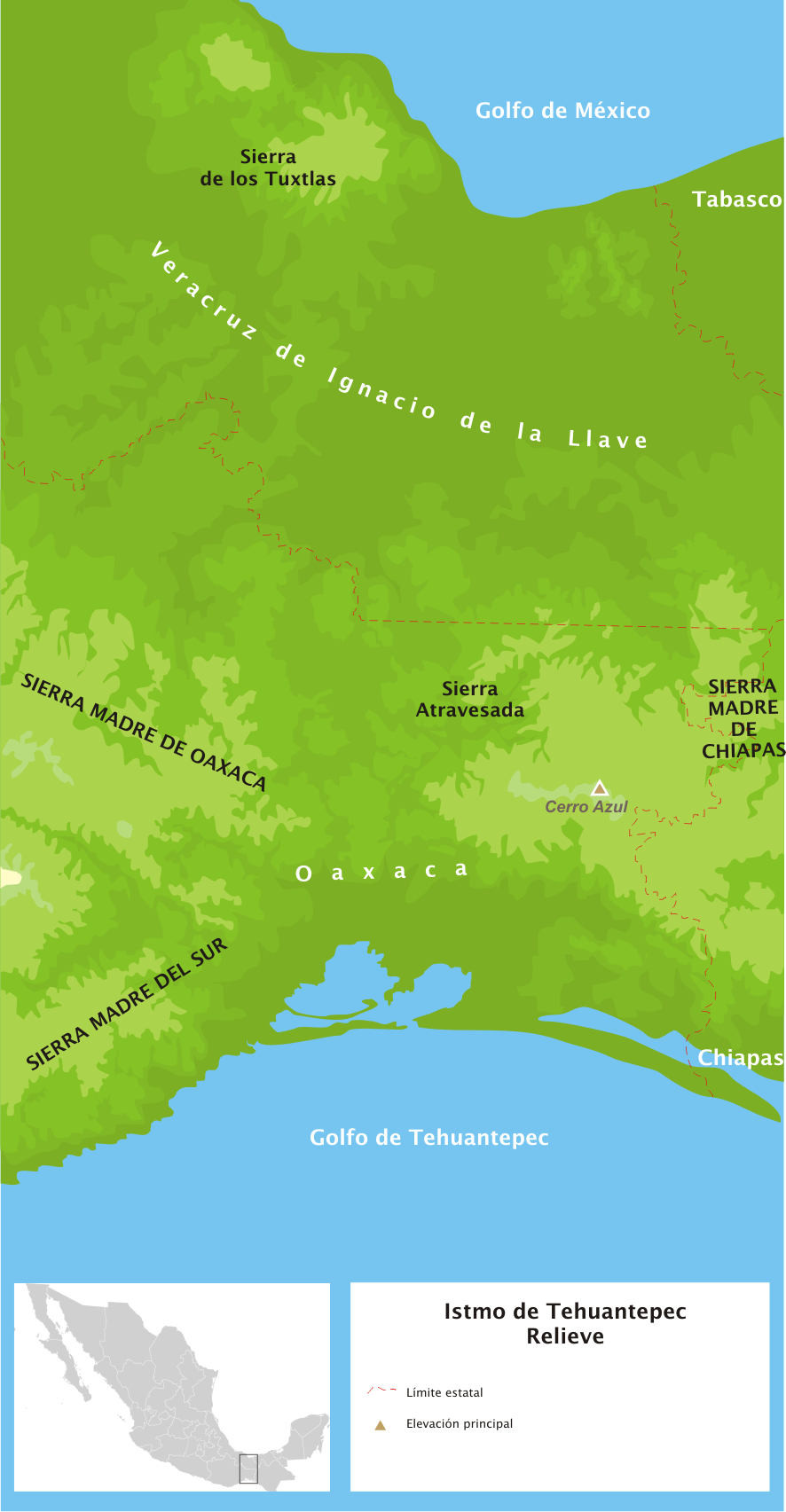
The Gulf of Tehuantepec is located on the Pacific coast of southern Mexico

The Gulf of Tehuantepec (Spanish: Golfo de Tehuantepec) is a large body of water on the Pacific coast of the Isthmus of Tehuantepec, southeastern Mexico, at 16°N 95°W. Many (but not all) Pacific hurricanes form in or near this body of water. A strong, gale-force wind called the Tehuano periodically blows out over the waters of the Gulf of Tehuantepec, inducing strong upwelling of nutrient-rich waters which support abundant sea life.

The gulf is in the path of the lowest landform between Mexico and Northern Central America, allowing unhindered wind passage from the Gulf of Mexico, and the Eastern Pacific Ocean.
