= Mexican Federal Highway 185 =

Highway in Mexico

Federal Highway 185
- Carretera federal 185

Route information
- Maintained by Secretariat of Infrastructure, Communications and Transportation
- Length: 302.35 km (187.87 mi)

Major junctions
- North end: Fed. 180 in Coatzacoalcos
- South end: Fed. 200 in Salina Cruz

Location
- Country: Mexico

Highway system
- Mexican Federal Highways; List; Autopistas
← Fed. 184	→ Fed. 186

Federal Highway 185 (Carretera Federal 185) is a Federal Highway of Mexico. The highway travels from Coatzacoalcos, Veracruz in the north to Salina Cruz, Oaxaca in the south. It is also known as the Carretera Transístmica because it crosses the Isthmus of Tehuantepec. It crosses the Sierra Madre de Oaxaca at Chivela Pass.
