= Garnacha (food) =

Mesoamerican dish

Garnachas
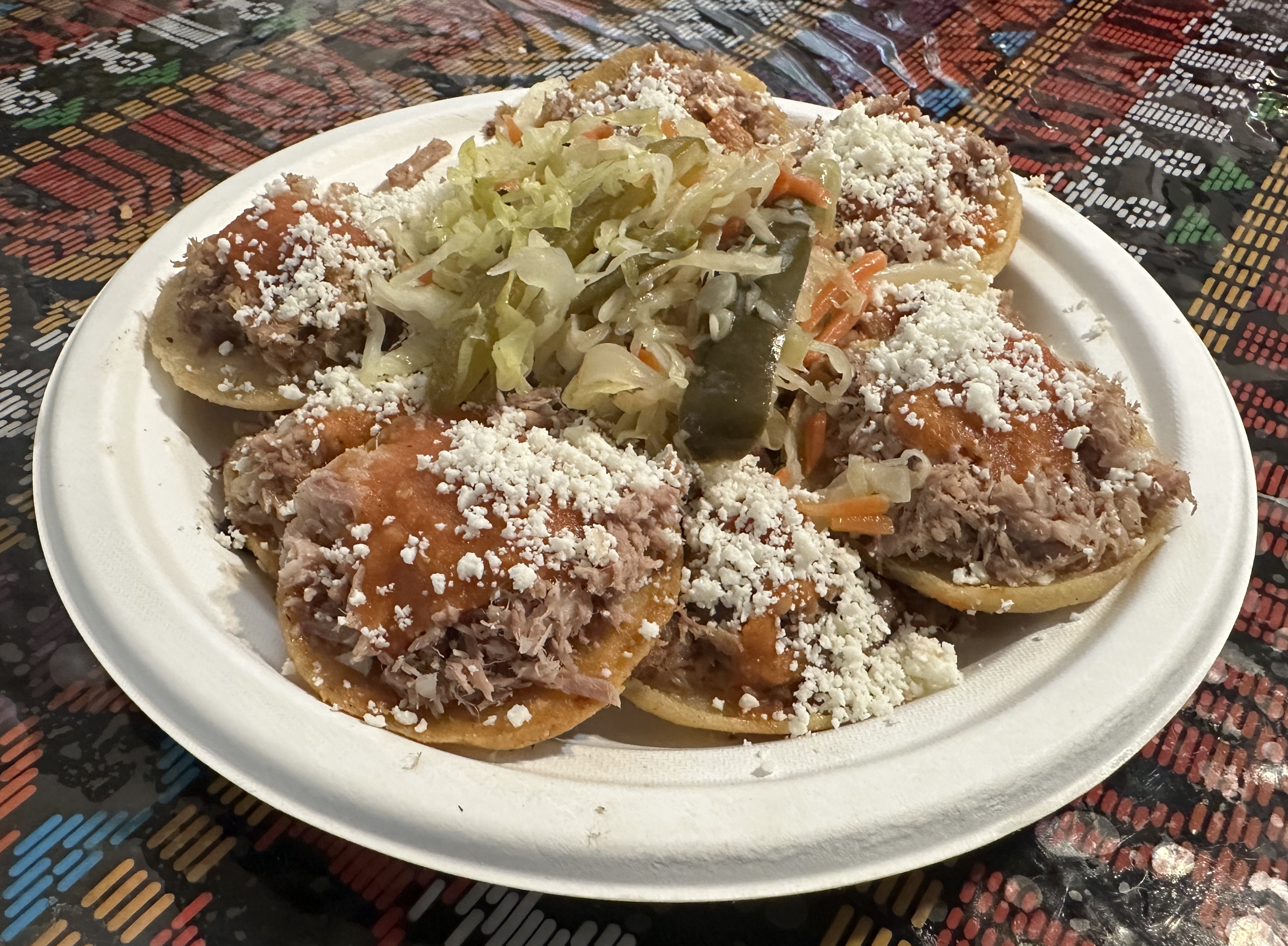
- Garnachas topped with tomato sauce, fresh cheese and curtido.
- Place of origin: Guatemala
- Main ingredients: Tortillas, refried beans, shredded cabbage, cheese

Garnachas (alternatively Garnaches) is a traditional Guatemalan dish composed of fried corn tortillas topped with refried beans, shredded cabbage, cheese, and other garnishes. Aside from Guatemala, garnaches are especially popular in Belize and in the Mexican states of Veracruz and Oaxaca.

== See also ==
- Tostada
