= Tehuantepecer =

Violent mountain-gap wind traveling through Chivela Pass

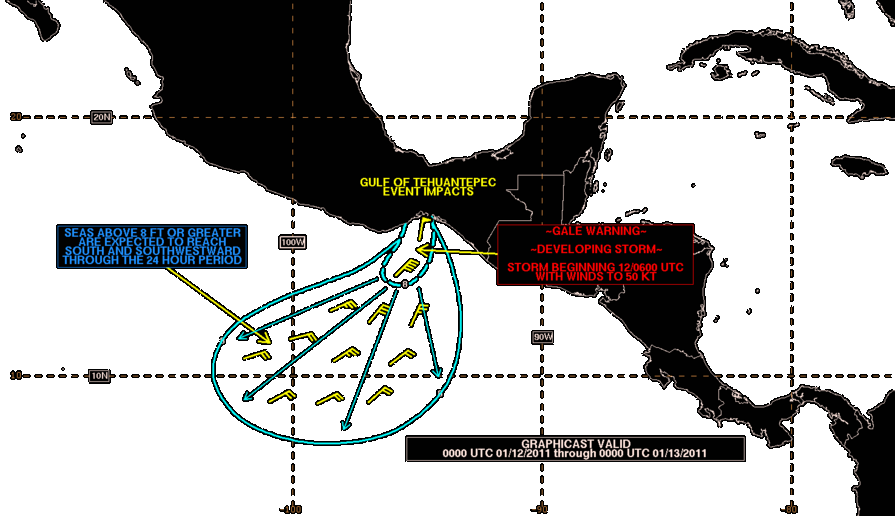
A graphicast issued by TAFB for a Tehuantepecer of January 11–12, 2011

Tehuantepecer, or Tehuano wind, is a violent mountain-gap wind that travels through the Chivela Pass in southern Mexico, across the Isthmus of Tehuantepec. It is most common between October and February, with a summer minimum in July. It originates from eastern Mexico and the Bay of Campeche as a post-frontal northerly wind, accelerated southward by cold air damming, that crosses the isthmus and blows through the gap between the Mexican and Guatemalan mountains. The term dates back to at least 1929. This wind can reach gale, storm, even hurricane force. The leading edge of its outflow (or cold front) may form rope cloud over the Gulf of Tehuantepec. These winds can be observed on satellite pictures such as scatterometer wind measurements, they influence waves which then propagate as swell and are sometimes observed 1,600 km (1,000 mi) away (such as in the Galapagos Islands). These strong winds bring cooler sub-surface waters to the surface of the tropical eastern Pacific Ocean and may last from a few hours to 6 days.

== Climatology ==
The synoptic condition is associated with the formation of high-pressure systems in Sierra Madre in the wake of an advancing cold front. Tehuantepecers primarily occur during the cold season months for the region in the wake of cold fronts, between October and February, with a summer minimum in July caused by the westward extension of the Azores-Bermuda high pressure system. Wind magnitude is greater during El Niño years than during La Niña years, due to the more frequent cold frontal incursions during El Niño winters. Tehuantepec winds reach 20 knots (40 km/h) to 45 knots (80 km/h), and on rare occasions 100 knots (190 km/h). The wind's direction is from the north to north-northeast. It leads to a localized acceleration of the trade winds in the region, and can enhance thunderstorm activity when it interacts with the Intertropical Convergence Zone. The effects can last from a few hours to six days.

=== As seen by weather satellites ===
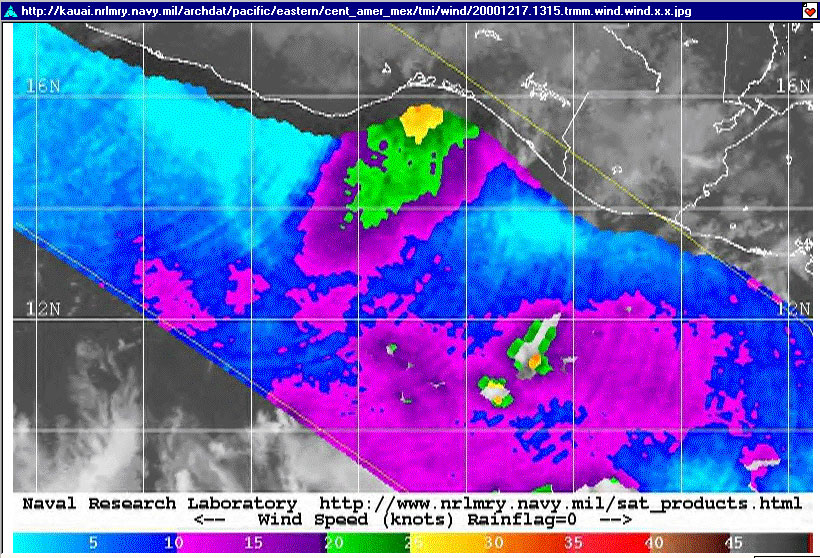
This TRMM weather satellite shows the wind impact of a Tehuantepecer from December 16, 2000, at 13:15 UTC.

The leading edge of a Tehuantepecer appears as a rope cloud within the visible and infrared channels of weather satellite imagery and is considered a cold front because of its density (temperature and dew point); though, it has also been described as a squall line with embedded rain squalls. On scatterometer data from polar orbiting imagery, this feature shows up as a corridor of strong, low-level winds at the south-to-southeast leading edge of the wind surge.

== Ocean impact ==
Tehuantepecers can be felt up to 160 kilometres (100 mi) out to sea in the tropical eastern Pacific Ocean. Sustained winds at sea have been recorded as high as 49.9 m/s (97.0 kn), with gusts as high as 60.2 m/s (117.0 kn), with a wind event in February 1974 which sandblasted the ship which took the observation. These winds cause waves which then propagate as swell and are sometimes observed 1,600 kilometres (1,000 mi) away (e.g., in the Galapagos Islands). Its effects can appear similar to a tropical cyclone, though the sky is usually clear. The surface wind can also change local ocean currents during an event. These strong winds upwell sub-surface waters, cooling the tropical eastern Pacific Ocean by as much as 14 °F (9 °C), and may last 4–7 days.

== Other reading ==
- Steenburgh, W.J., D.M. Schultz, B.A. Colle, 1998: The Structure and Evolution of Gap Outflow over the Gulf of Tehuantepec, Mexico. Monthly Weather Review, Vol. 126, pp. 2673–2691
- Bourassa MA, Zamudio L, O’Brien JJ, Noninertial flow in NSCAT observations of Tehuantepec winds, Journal of Geophysical Research-Oceans, 104 (C5): 11311-11319 MAY 15 1999
- Chelton DB, Freilich MH, Esbensen SK, Satellite observations of the wind jets off the Pacific coast of Central America. Part I: Case studies and statistical characteristics, Monthly Weather Review, 128 (7): 1993-2018 Part 1 JUL 2000
