= Keeper Trout =

American scholar (born 1957)

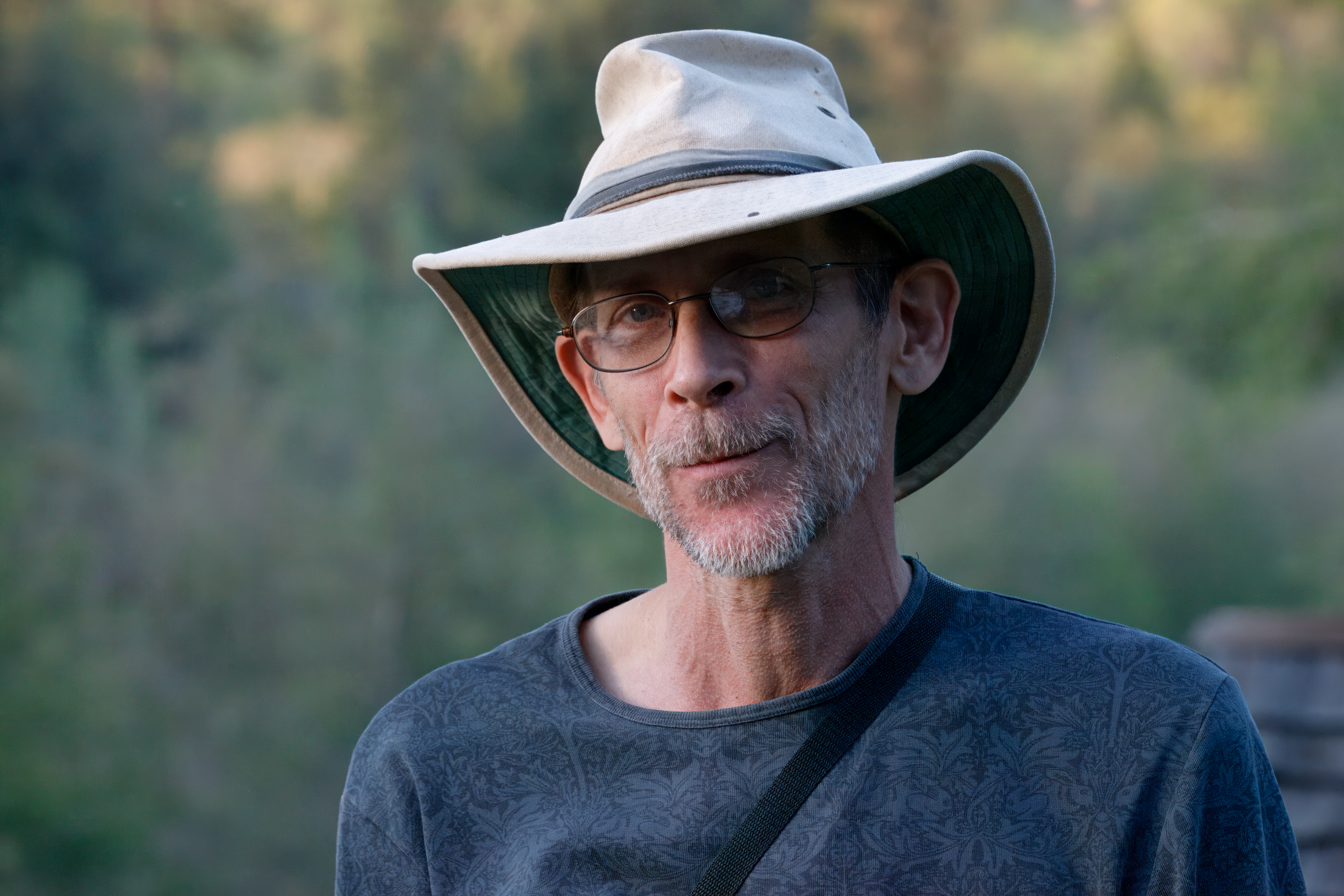
- Trout in 2013
- Born: October 1957 (age 68–69)
- Other names: Trout, K. Trout, Keeper of the Trout
- Occupations: Author, photographer, ethnobotanist, archivist, conservationist
- Years active: 1991–present
- Organization(s): Erowid, Shulgin Farm, Cactus Conservation Institute, Chihuahuan Desert Preserve Association
- Known for: Books, articles, editing, archiving, and conservation efforts
- Notable work: Sacred Cacti, Some Simple Tryptamines, others
- Website: troutsnotes.com sacredcacti.com

Keeper Trout (born October 1957), also known as Keeper of the Trout, is an American independent scholar in the area of psychedelics and psychedelic plants, especially cacti. He is variously described as an author, photographer, ethnobotanist, archivist, and conservationist.

Trout first became interested in the psychedelic experience in 1972 when he was 14 years old. He studied chemistry and microbiology at university in Texas. Trout worked as a lapidarist but eventually was unable to continue doing this work due having come down with encephalitis, which had led to blindness in one eye and loss of his depth perception. In 1991, he pivoted direction and started working more publicly in the area of psychedelics. In 1993, Trout met Alexander and Ann Shulgin and others at a psychedelic conference and they encouraged him to start writing. He has since written numerous books and other publications on psychedelic plants and alkaloids, including his notable Trout's Notes series. His books are published by Mydriatic Productions, a division of Better Days Publishing.

From 1998 through 2008, Trout was the technical editor of The Entheogen Review. He is a co-founder and board member of the Cactus Conservation Institute and a board member of the Chihuahuan Desert Preserve Association. Trout does work for Erowid and Transform Press, is a board member of the Shulgin Farm, and works at the Shulgin Archiving Project, digitizing the materials of Alexander and Ann Shulgin. He has been interviewed for books like Michael Pollan's This Is Your Mind On Plants (2021) and Mike Jay's Mescaline: A Global History of the First Psychedelic (2019).

== Selected publications ==
=== Books and related ===
- Trout's Notes: A Simple Alkaloid Volatizer (1995/1998)
- Trout's Notes on Cultivation of Desmanthus for Rootbark Production (1995/2000)
- Trout's Notes: The Peyote Crisis & Some Suggestions (1995/1998/1999/2001)
- Trout's Notes on the Genus Desmodium (1996/2004)
- Trout's Notes on the Cultivation & Propagation of Cacti (1996/1999/2001)
- Trout's Notes: Summary of the Reported Occurrences of Mescaline (1997/1999/2001)
- Trout's Notes on Ayahuasca and Ayahuasca Alkaloids (1997/1998) (subsequently titled Ayahuasca: Alkaloids, Plants & Analogs (2004))
- Trout's Notes: Tryptamines from Higher Plants (1997/1998)
- Trout's Notes on the Acacia Species Reported to Contain Tryptamines and/or Beta-Carbolines (1997/1998)
- Sacred Cacti and Some Selected Succulents: Botany, Chemistry, Cultivation and Use (later titled simply Sacred Cacti) (1997/2001/2006/2015)
- Trout's Notes: 5-Bromo- and 5,6-Dibromo-DMT Fact Sheet (1997)
- Trout's Notes on Cactus Chemistry by Species (1999/2013)
- Ayahuasca Analogues and Plant-Based Tryptamines: The Best of The Entheogen Review 1992–1999 (2000)
- Some Simple Tryptamines (2002/2007)
- Trout's Notes on Some Other Succulents (2004) (from Sacred Cacti)
- Trout's Notes Tryptamine Content of Arundo donax (2004)
- Desmanthus leptolobus (2004)
- Trout's Notes on San Pedro & Related Trichocereus Species (2005)

=== Journal articles ===
- Trout K, Hoffman M (2001). "Faith, Belief, and the Peyote Crisis". Entheos: The Journal of Psychedelic Spirituality. 1 (2): e1–e5. Archived from the original on 19 May 2025.
- Trout K (2008). "Old Hair and Tryptamines". Entheogen Review. 16 (4): 146–149. Archived from the original on 2025-05-19.
- Ogunbodede O, McCombs D, Trout K, Daley P, Terry M (September 2010). "New mescaline concentrations from 14 taxa/cultivars of Echinopsis spp. (Cactaceae) ("San Pedro") and their relevance to shamanic practice" (PDF). J Ethnopharmacol. 131 (2): 356–362. doi:10.1016/j.jep.2010.07.021. PMID 20637277.
- Terry, Martin; Trout, Keeper; Williams, Bennie; Herrera, Teodoso; Fowler, Norma (2011). "Limitations to natural production of Lophophora williamsii (Cactaceae) I. Regrowth and survivorship two years post harvest in a South Texas population" (PDF). Journal of the Botanical Research Institute of Texas. 5 (2). The Botanical Research Institute of Texas, Inc.: 661–675. ISSN 1934-5259. JSTOR 41972319. Archived from the original on 7 December 2011.
- Terry M, Trout K, Williams B, Herrera T, Fowler N (7 December 2011). "Limitations to natural production of Lophophora williamsii (Cactaceae) II. Effects of repeated harvesting at two-year intervals in a South Texas population" (PDF). Journal of the Botanical Research Institute of Texas. 5 (2): 661–675. JSTOR 41972319. Archived from the original on 7 December 2011.
- Terry, Martin; Trout, Keeper; Williams, Bennie; Herrera, Teodoso; Fowler, Norma (25 November 2014). "Limitations to Natural Production of Lophophora Williamsii (Cactaceae) III. Effects of Repeated Harvesting at Two-Year Intervals for Six Years in a South Texas (U.S.A.) Population" (PDF). Journal of the Botanical Research Institute of Texas. 8 (2). [The Botanical Research Institute of Texas, Inc., BRIT Press]: 541–550. ISSN 1934-5259. JSTOR 26549404. Archived from the original on 25 November 2014.
- Kalam MA, Trout K, Klein MT, Daley P, Hulsey D, Terry M (27 August 2013). "A preliminary report of mescaline concentrations in small regrowth crowns vs. mature crowns of Lophophora williamsii (Cactaceae): Cultural, economic, and conservation implications". Journal of the Botanical Research Institute of Texas. 7 (1): 435–440. JSTOR 24621093.
- Terry M, Trout K (November 2013). "Cultivation of peyote: a logical and practical solution to the problem of decreased availability" (PDF). Phytologia. 95 (4): 314–320.
- Klein, Molly T.; Kalam, M.; Trout, Keeper; Fowler, Norma; Terry, Martin (2015). "Mescaline Concentrations in Three Principal Tissues of Lophophora williamsii (Cactaceae): Implications for Sustainable Harvesting Practices" (PDF). Haseltonia. 20: 34–42. Bibcode:2015Hasel..20...34K. doi:10.2985/026.020.0107. ISSN 1070-0048. Archived from the original on 22 April 2015.
- Terry, Martin; Trout, Keeper (24 July 2017). "Regulation of Peyote (Lophophora williamsii: Cactaceae) in the U.S.A.: A Historical Victory of Religion and Politics Over Science and Medicine" (PDF). Journal of the Botanical Research Institute of Texas. 11 (1): 147–156. doi:10.17348/jbrit.v11.i1.1146. ISSN 2644-1608.
- Ermakova, Anna; Whiting, Carolyn V.; Trout, Keeper; Clubbe, Colin; Terry, Martin K.; Fowler, Norma (23 July 2021). "Densities, plant sizes, and spatial distributions of six wild populations of Lophophora williamsii (Cactaceae) in Texas, U.S.A." Journal of the Botanical Research Institute of Texas. 15 (1): 149–160. doi:10.17348/jbrit.v15.i1.1057. ISSN 2644-1608. Archived from the original on 2024-09-09.
- Ermakova, Anna O.; Terry, Martin K.; Trout, Keeper (23 May 2022). "Cultivation as a conservation tool for cacti: review of the botanical evidence and a case study of Lophophora williamsii" (PDF). Bradleya. 2022 (sp40). doi:10.25223/brad.sp40.2022.a8. ISSN 0265-086X.
- Trout K, Daley PF (December 2024). "The origin of 2,5-dimethoxy-4-methylamphetamine (DOM, STP)" (PDF). Drug Test Anal. 16 (12): 1496–1508. doi:10.1002/dta.3667. PMID 38419183.

=== Book chapters ===
- Trout K, Terry M (18 January 2016). "Decline of the Genus Lophophora in Texas". In Labate BC, Cavnar C (eds.). Peyote: History, Tradition, Politics, and Conservation. ABC-CLIO, LLC. pp. 1–20. doi:10.5040/9798400696572.ch-001. ISBN 978-1-4408-3401-1.
- Trout K (6 July 2018). "Mescal, Peyote and the Red Bean: A Peculiar Conceptual Collision in Early Modern Ethnobotany". In McKenna D, Prance GT, Davis W, De Leonen B (eds.). Ethnopharmacologic Search for Psychoactive Drugs (ESPD), 50 Years of Research (1967–2017): 50th Anniversary Symposium, June 6 – 8, 2017 (Volumes 1 and 2). Santa Fe, California: Synergetic Press, in association with Heffter Research Institute. pp. 234–256. ISBN 9780907791683. OCLC 1077478785. OL 27849521M.

== See also ==
- Alexander Shulgin Research Institute
- Substituted tetrahydroisoquinoline
- Peyote § Constituents
- Pachycereus pringlei § Constituents and effects
- The Simple Plant Isoquinolines (2002)
