= Phenethylamine: Von der Struktur zur Funktion =

2013 textbook

- Author: Daniel Trachsel, David Lehmann, and Christoph Enzensperger
- Translator: Alexander Shulgin Research Institute, David Carlson (both in-progress)
- Language: German
- Subject: Phenethylamine chemistry and pharmacology
- Genre: Non-fiction
- Publisher: Nachtschatten Verlag
- Publication date: 2013
- Publication place: Solothurn, Switzerland
- English publication date: Pending
- Pages: 1,003
- ISBN: 978-3-03788-700-4
- OCLC: 858805226
- Website: Publisher page; Internet Archive

Phenethylamine: Von der Struktur zur Funktion, with the title translating in English to Phenethylamines: From Structure to Function, is a 2013 scientific textbook about substituted phenethylamines written by the Swiss chemist Daniel Trachsel along with co-authors David Lehmann and Christoph Enzensperger. It focuses on the chemistry and pharmacology of psychoactive phenethylamines, including psychedelics like mescaline, entactogens like MDMA, and stimulants like amphetamine, but also thoroughly covers medicinal phenethylamines, like appetite suppressants, antidepressants, sympathomimetics, and beta blockers.

The book discusses more than 2,300 phenethylamine and related compounds and is said to systemically describe most or all known and relevant phenethylamines. It features an extensive bibliography of more than 2,400 literature references. In the book, Trachsel publishes original data for self-experiments and human bioassays for dozens of novel compounds, such as dose, duration, and subjective effects, analogous to Alexander Shulgin's work in his books PiHKAL (Phenethylamines I Have Known and Loved) and TiHKAL (Tryptamines I Have Known and Loved). Trachsel has published many of these findings in a 2012 literature review titled "Fluorine in Psychedelic Phenethylamines" as well. However, he has distanced himself from any personal self-experiments. The foreword of the book was written by the renowned psychedelic chemist David E. Nichols. Shulgin was an inspiration for the book.

The book has been reviewed by various authors, such as Alexander Paulke and Peter Gasser. It is said to be among the only comprehensive books on phenethylamines of its kind. Along with Shulgin's books, it has also been described as a "foundational" text on phenethylamines.

According to Hamilton Morris and Nicholas Cozzi in mid-2023, the book is being translated into English. It is specifically being translated by the Alexander Shulgin Research Institute (ASRI) (associated with Cozzi and Paul F. Daley), with tentative publication by the Shulgin publishing company Transform Press, and is also independently being translated into English by the chemist David Carlson.

== See also ==
- List of psychedelic literature
- Daniel Trachsel § Compounds
- PiHKAL (Phenethylamines I Have Known and Loved) (1991)
- TiHKAL (Tryptamines I Have Known and Loved) (1997)
- The Shulgin Index, Volume One: Psychedelic Phenethylamines and Related Compounds (2011)
