= Bibliography of Alexander Shulgin =

This is a bibliography, or list of publications, of the psychedelic chemist Alexander Shulgin.

== Books ==
- Shulgin AT (1988). The Controlled Substances Act: A Resource Manual of the Current Status of the Federal Drug Laws (1 ed.). Lafayette, California: A. T. Shulgin. OCLC 22676094. OL 58242586M.
- Alexander T. Shulgin; Ann Shulgin (1991). PiHKAL: A Chemical Love Story (1st ed.). Berkeley, CA: Transform Press. ISBN 978-0-9630096-0-9. OCLC 25627628.
- Shulgin AT (1992). Controlled Substances: A Chemical and Legal Guide to the Federal Drug Laws (2 ed.). Berkeley, California: Ronin Publishing. ISBN 9780914171430. OCLC 26815633. OL 1140749M.
- Alexander T. Shulgin; Ann Shulgin (1997). TiHKAL: The Continuation (1st ed.). Berkeley, CA: Transform Press. ISBN 978-0-9630096-9-2. OCLC 38503252.
- Shulgin, Alexander Theodore; Perry, Wendy E. (2002). The Simple Plant Isoquinolines. Transform Press. ISBN 978-0-9630096-2-3. OCLC 51006569. OL 8521520M.
- Shulgin, A.; Manning, T.; Daley, P.F. (2011). The Shulgin Index, Volume One: Psychedelic Phenethylamines and Related Compounds. Vol. 1. Berkeley: Transform Press. ISBN 978-0-9630096-3-0.
- Shulgin, Alexander T.; Shulgin, Ann (2018). The Commemorative Edition of Pihkal and Tihkal (1 ed.). Transform Press. ISBN 978-0-9630096-6-1. OCLC 1176317484.
- Shulgin, Alexander; Shulgin, Ann (2021). The Commemorative PiHKAL and TiHKAL: 30th Anniversary Edition / The 30th Anniversary Memorial Edition of PIHKAL and TIHKAL (2 ed.). Transform Press. ISBN 978-0-9995472-3-6. OCLC 1232516684.
- Shulgin, Alexander (2021). The Nature of Drugs: History, Pharmacology, and Social Impact, Volume One. Vol. 1. Transform Press. ISBN 978-0-9995472-1-2. OCLC 1202745911.
- Shulgin, Alexander (2023). The Nature of Drugs: History, Pharmacology, and Social Impact, Volume Two. Vol. 2. Transform Press. ISBN 9780999547250. OCLC 1388539720.

== Book chapters ==
=== 1960s ===
- Alexander T. Shulgin, Thornton Sargent, Claudio Naranjo (1967). "The Chemistry and Psychopharmacology of Nutmeg and of Several Related Phenylisopropylamines". In Efron DH, Holmstedt B, Kline NS (eds.). Ethnopharmacologic Search for Psychoactive Drugs: Proceedings of a Symposium Held in San Francisco, California, January 28–30, 1967. New York: Raven Press. pp. 202–214. ISBN 978-0-89004-047-8. OCLC 14498182. OL 14623132M. Archived from the original on 12 July 2025.
- Truitt EB, Naranjo C, Sargent T, Shulgin AT, Weil AT (1967). "Discussion [of Nutmeg]". In Efron DH, Holmstedt B, Kline NS (eds.). Ethnopharmacologic Search for Psychoactive Drugs: Proceedings of a Symposium Held in San Francisco, California, January 28–30, 1967. New York: Raven Press. pp. 223–229. ISBN 978-0-89004-047-8. OCLC 14498182. OL 14623132M. Archived from the original on 12 July 2025.

=== 1970s ===
- Shulgin A (1970). "Chemistry and Structure-Activity Relationships of the Psychotomimetics". In Efron DH (ed.). Psychotomimetic Drugs: Proceedings of a Workshop Organized by the Pharmacology Section, Psychopharmacology Research Branch, National Institute of Mental Health. New York: Raven Press. pp. 21–41. ISBN 9780911216073. OCLC 58755. Archived from the original on 12 July 2025.
- Shulgin AT (1971). "Chemistry and Sources". In Epstein SS, Lederberg J (eds.). Drugs of Abuse: Their Genetic and Other Chronic Nonpsychiatric Hazards. Cambridge, Massachusetts: MIT Press. pp. 3–26. ISBN 9780262050098. OCLC 208409. OL 22156530M.
- Shulgin AT (1972). "Hallucinogens, CNS Stimulants, And Cannabis". In Mule SJ, Brill H (eds.). Chemical and Biological Aspects of Drug Dependence. CRC Press. pp. 163–176. doi:10.1201/9780429260629-16. ISBN 978-0-87819-011-9.
- Alexander T. Shulgin (1973). "Drugs of Abuse in the Future". In United States Commission on Marihuana and Drug Abuse (ed.). Drug Use in America: Problem in Perspective: The Technical Papers of the Second Report of the National Commission on Marihuana and Drug Abuse, Volume I: Patterns and Consequences of Drug Use. Vol. 1. United States Commission on Marihuana and Drug Abuse. pp. 209–236.
- Alexander T. Shulgin (1975). "The Chemical Catalysis of Altered States of Consciousness". In Drug Abuse Council (ed.). Altered States of Consciousness: Current Views and Research Problems. Drug Abuse Council. pp. 123–134. Archived from the original on 7 July 2025.
- Shulgin AT (1976). "Psychotomimetic Agents". In Gordon M (ed.). Psychopharmacological Agents: Use, Misuse and Abuse. Medicinal Chemistry: A Series of Monographs. Vol. 4. Academic Press. pp. 59–146. doi:10.1016/b978-0-12-290559-9.50011-9. ISBN 978-0-12-290559-9.
- Alexander T. Shulgin (1977). "Introduction". In Huxley A, Horowitz M, Palmer C (eds.). Moksha: [Aldous Huxley's] Writings on Psychedelics and the Visionary Experience (1931-1963). New York: Stonehill. pp. xvii–xix. ISBN 978-0-88373-042-3.
- Shulgin AT (1978). "Psychotomimetic Drugs: Structure-Activity Relationships". In Iversen LL, Iversen SD, Snyder SH (eds.). Stimulants. Boston, MA: Springer US. pp. 243–333. doi:10.1007/978-1-4757-0510-2_6. ISBN 978-1-4757-0512-6.
- Shulgin AT, Nichols DE (1978). "Characterization of Three New Psychotomimetics". In Stillman RC, Willette RE (eds.). The Psychopharmacology of Hallucinogens. Elsevier. pp. 74–83. doi:10.1016/b978-0-08-021938-7.50010-2. ISBN 978-0-08-021938-7.
- Anderson GM, Braun G, Braun U, Nichols DE, Shulgin AT (1978). "Absolute Configuration and Psychotomimetic Activity" ( (PDF)). In Barnett G, Trsic M, Willette RE (eds.). QuaSAR: Quantitative Structure Activity Relationships Of Analgesics, Narcotic Antagonists, And Hallucinogens (PDF). National Institute on Drug Abuse Research Monograph Series. Vol. 22. National Institute on Drug Abuse. pp. 8–15. PMID 101890. Archived from the original on 2023-08-05.
- Braun U, Braun G, Jacob P, Nichols DE, Shulgin AT (1978). "Mescaline Analogs: Substitutions at the 4-Position" ( (PDF)). In Barnett G, Trsic M, Willette RE (eds.). QuaSAR: Quantitative Structure Activity Relationships Of Analgesics, Narcotic Antagonists, And Hallucinogens (PDF). National Institute on Drug Abuse Research Monograph Series. Vol. 22. National Institute on Drug Abuse. pp. 27–37. PMID 101882. Archived from the original on 2023-08-05.

=== 1980s ===
- Shulgin AT (1980). "Hallucinogens". In Burger A, Wolf ME (eds.). Burger's Medicinal Chemistry. Vol. 3 (4 ed.). New York: Wiley. pp. 1109–1137. ISBN 978-0-471-01572-7. OCLC 219960627.
- Shulgin AT (1982). "Chemistry of Psychotomimetics". In Hoffmeister F, Stille G (eds.). Psychotropic Agents, Part III: Alcohol and Psychotomimetics, Psychotropic Effects of Central Acting Drugs. Handbook of Experimental Pharmacology. Vol. 55. Berlin: Springer Berlin Heidelberg. pp. 3–29. doi:10.1007/978-3-642-67770-0_1. ISBN 978-3-642-67772-4. OCLC 8130916.
- Shulgin AT (1983). "Twenty Years On an Ever-Changing Quest". In Grinspoon L, Bakalar JB (eds.). Psychedelic Reflections. New York: Human Sciences Press. pp. 205–212. ISBN 978-0-89885-129-8. OCLC 9195516. Archived from the original on 6 July 2025.
- Seymour R, Shulgin AT (1986). "An Annotated Bibliography on MDMA". In Seymour R (ed.). MDMA. San Francisco: Haight-Ashbury Publications. pp. 117–131. OCLC 944040574.
- Alexander Shulgin (1988). "Retro Flections". In Timothy Leary (ed.). The Politics of Psychopharmacology. Berkeley: Ronin Publishing. pp. 5–9. ISBN 978-1-57951-047-3.

=== 1990s ===
- Shulgin AT (1990). "History of MDMA". In Peroutka SJ (ed.). Ecstasy: The Clinical, Pharmacological and Neurotoxicological Effects of the Drug MDMA. Topics in the Neurosciences. Vol. 9. Boston, MA: Springer US. pp. 1–20. doi:10.1007/978-1-4613-1485-1_1. ISBN 978-1-4612-8799-5.
- Shulgin AT (1990). "Celebrating Gordon Wasson". In Riedlinger TJ (ed.). The Sacred Mushroom Seeker. Tributes to R. Gordon Wasson. Ethno-Mycological Studies. Vol. 11. Rochester, Vermont: Park Street Press. pp. 227–230. ISBN 9780931146176. OCLC 21947967. OL 8383625M.
- Alexander Shulgin (1993). "Appendix 4: Bibliography". In Saunders N, Heron L (eds.). E for Ecstasy. London: Nicholas Saunders. ISBN 978-0-9501628-8-1. OCLC 29388575.
- Shulgin A, Shulgin A (1993). "Barriers to Research". In Rätsch C, Baker JR (eds.). Jahrbuch für Ethnomedizin und Bewußtseinsforschung [Yearbook for Ethnomedicine and the Study of Consciousness]. Vol. 2. Berlin: Verlag fur Wissenschaft und Bildung. pp. 9–20.
- Jacob P, Shulgin AT (1994). "Structure-Activity Relationships of the Classic Hallucinogens and Their Analogs". In Lin GC, Glennon RA (eds.). Hallucinogens: An Update (PDF). National Institute on Drug Abuse Research Monograph Series. Vol. 146. National Institute on Drug Abuse. pp. 74–91. PMID 8742795. Archived from the original on 13 July 2025.
- Shulgin AT (1994). "El Arte de Ver" [The Art of Seeing]. In Fericgla JM (ed.). Plantas, Chamanismo y Estados de Consciencia [Plants, Shamanism and States of Consciousness]. Barcelona: Los Libros de la Lièbre de Marzo. pp. 19–24. ISBN 9788487403149. OCLC 33858055.
- Alexander Shulgin (1995). "Entactogen Research: An Act of Balance". In European College for the Study of Consciousness (ed.). First International Congress of the European College for the Study of Consciousness, Göttingen, Germany, 24-27 Septembre 1992. World of Consciousness. Vol. 5. Berlin: Verlag für Wissenschaft und Bildung. pp. 177–183. ISBN 9783861354062. OCLC 164818348. OL 1189343M.
- Shulgin AT, Shulgin A (1997). "A New Vocabulary". In Forte R (ed.). Entheogens and the Future of Religion. San Francisco: Council on Spiritual Practices. pp. 53–63. ISBN 978-1-59477-797-4. OCLC 1491015718.
- Shulgin AT (1997). "Die Frühe Geschichte von MDMA" [The Early History of MDMA]. In Neumeyer J, Schmidt-Semisch H (eds.). Ecstasy: Design für die Seele? [Ecstasy: Design for the Soul?]. Freiburg: Lambertus. pp. 97–105. ISBN 9783784109442. OCLC 40284932. OL 12881227M.
- Shulgin A (1997). "La bioquímica de los estados de trance" [The biochemistry of trance states]. Poveda.
- Alexander T. Shulgin (1997). "Epilogue: The Last Trip: Peaceful Closure for Jacob" (PDF). In Myron J. Stolaroff (ed.). The Secret Chief: Conversations With a Pioneer of the Underground Psychedelic Therapy Movement (PDF). Charlotte, North Carolina: Multidisciplinary Association for Psychedelic Studies. ISBN 0-9660019-1-5.
- Alexander Shulgin (1998). "Foreword" (PDF). In David E. Nichols (ed.). The Heffter Review of Psychedelic Research. Vol. 1. Santa Fe, New Mexico: Heffter Research Institute. pp. v–vi. ISSN 1534-9640. OCLC 40576381.

=== 2000s ===
- Shulgin A, Shulgin A (2000). "Preface". In Saunders N, Saunders A, Pauli M (eds.). In Search of the Ultimate High: Spiritual Experience from Psychoactives. Rider. pp. 7–9. ISBN 9780712670876. Archived from the original on 13 July 2025.
- Alexander T. Shulgin (2001). "A Scientist's View of Miracles and Magic". In Roberts TB (ed.). Psychoactive Sacramentals: Essays on Entheogens and Religion. Council on Spiritual Practices. pp. 113–120. ISBN 978-1-889725-02-4. Archived from the original on 13 July 2025.
- Shulgin AT (2003). "Basic Pharmacology and Effects". In Laing RR (ed.). Hallucinogens: A Forensic Drug Handbook. Forensic Drug Handbook Series. Elsevier Science. pp. 67–137. ISBN 978-0-12-433951-4. Archived from the original on 13 July 2025.
- Shulgin AT, Shulgin A (2005). "Frontiers of Pharmacology: Chemistry and Consciousness". In Walsh R, Grob CS (eds.). Higher Wisdom: Eminent Elders Explore the Continuing Impact of Psychedelics. SUNY series in Transpersonal and Humanistic Psychology. State University of New York Press. pp. 69–88. ISBN 978-0-7914-8296-4. Archived from the original on 12 July 2025.
- Alexandr T. Shulgin (2006). "Foreword". In Ketchum JS (ed.). Chemical Warfare Secrets Almost Forgotten: A Personal Story of Medical Testing of Army Volunteers with Incapacitating Chemical Agents During the Cold War (1955-1975). ChemBooks. ISBN 978-1-4243-0080-8. Archived from the original on 13 July 2025.

=== 2010s ===
- Shulgin AT (2010). "Chemistry and Memory". In Millay J (ed.). Radiant Minds: Scientists Explore the Dimensions of Consciousness. Millay. pp. 190–197. ISBN 978-0-615-29633-3. OCLC 694807638.

== Journal articles ==
=== 1950s ===
- Gal, Emery M.; Shulgin, Alexander T. (1951). "Improved Syntheses of C14 -Labeled Malonic Acid and Malononitrile 1". Journal of the American Chemical Society. 73 (6): 2938–2939. Bibcode:1951JAChS..73.2938G. doi:10.1021/ja01150a506. ISSN 0002-7863.
- Shulgin, Alexander T.; Lien, Oliver G.; Gal, Emery M.; Greenberg, David M. (1952). "Synthesis and Chromatographic Separation of Isotopically Labeled DL-Threonine and DL-Allothreonine 1". Journal of the American Chemical Society. 74 (9): 2427–2429. Bibcode:1952JAChS..74.2427S. doi:10.1021/ja01129a081. ISSN 0002-7863.
- Lein OG, Shulgin AT, Gal EM, Greenberg DM (April 1952). "Feasibility of quantitative separation of the threo- and erythro-forms of amino-acids by column chromatography". Nature. 169 (4304): 707. Bibcode:1952Natur.169..707L. doi:10.1038/169707a0. PMID 14956990.
- Clemo, G. R.; Holt, R. J. W.; Bew, D. G.; Chakravarti, R. N.; Shulgin, Alexander T.; Gal, Emery M.; Le Fèvre, R. J. W.; Youhotsky, I.; Addison, C. C.; Lewis, J.; Potter, M. D.; Taylor, E. P. (1953). "Notes: 267. A New Synthesis of 2 : 5-Dihydroxyphenyl-DL-alanine adapted to Isotopic Scale". J. Chem. Soc. 0: 1313–1321 (1316–1318). doi:10.1039/JR9530001313. ISSN 0368-1769.
- Shulgin, Alexander T. (1955). "Absence of Rearrangement in the Bromination of sec-Butyl Alcohol 1a". Journal of the American Chemical Society. 77 (8): 2338–2339. Bibcode:1955JAChS..77.2338S. doi:10.1021/ja01613a099. ISSN 0002-7863.
- Baker, A. W.; Shulgin, A. T. (1958). "Intramolecular Hydrogen Bonds to π-Electrons and Other Weakly Basic Groups". Journal of the American Chemical Society. 80 (20): 5358–5363. Bibcode:1958JAChS..80.5358B. doi:10.1021/ja01553a010. ISSN 0002-7863.
- Shulgin, A. T.; Baker, A. W. (8 November 1958). "Determination of Hammett Sigma Constants by Intramolecular Hydrogen Bonding". Nature. 182 (4645): 1299. Bibcode:1958Natur.182.1299S. doi:10.1038/1821299a0. ISSN 0028-0836.
- Baker, A. W.; Shulgin, A. T. (1959). "Intramolecular Hydrogen Bonding. II. The Determination of Hammett Sigma Constants by Intramolecular Hydrogen Bonding in Schiff's Bases". Journal of the American Chemical Society. 81 (7): 1523–1529. Bibcode:1959JAChS..81.1523B. doi:10.1021/ja01516a001. ISSN 0002-7863.
- Baker, A. W.; Shulgin, A. T. (1959). "Physical and Chemical Effects of Substituent Groups on Multiple Bonds. I. Methyl Substituted Olefins". Journal of the American Chemical Society. 81 (17): 4524–4528. Bibcode:1959JAChS..81.4524B. doi:10.1021/ja01526a021. ISSN 0002-7863.

=== 1960s ===
- Shulgin, A; Kerlinger, H (1960). "Notes: Isolation and Characterization of a Phenol Half-Salt". The Journal of Organic Chemistry. 25 (11): 2037–2039. doi:10.1021/jo01081a605. ISSN 0022-3263.
- Shulgin, Alexander T.; Bunnell, Sterling; Sargent, Thornton (1961). "The Psychotomimetic Properties of 3,4,5-Trimethoxyamphetamine". Nature. 189 (4769): 1011–1012. Bibcode:1961Natur.189.1011S. doi:10.1038/1891011a0. ISSN 0028-0836. Archived from the original on 2025-07-12.
- Kaeding, Warren W.; Shulgin, Alexander T. (1962). "Preparation of Salicylic Acids by the Hydroxylation of Benzoic Acids". The Journal of Organic Chemistry. 27 (10): 3551–3554. doi:10.1021/jo01057a035. ISSN 0022-3263.
- Shulgin, Alexander T. (1962). "The Baeyer—Villiger Condensation. I. ortho-Tritylation of Phenols". The Journal of Organic Chemistry. 27 (11): 3868–3872. doi:10.1021/jo01058a026. ISSN 0022-3263.
- Shulgin, Alexander T. (26 January 1963). "Composition of the Myristicin Fraction from Oil of Nutmeg". Nature. 197 (4865): 379. Bibcode:1963Natur.197..379S. doi:10.1038/197379a0. ISSN 0028-0836. Archived from the original on 2025-07-12.
- Shuglin AT (1963). "Psychotomimetic Agents Related to Mescaline". Chemical Abstracts. 59: 3797b–3797e. Archived from the original on 2025-07-12.
- Shulgin AT (March 1963). "Psychotomimetic Agents Related to Mescaline". Experientia. 19 (3): 127–128. doi:10.1007/BF02171586. PMID 13988773.
- Shulgin AT (October 1963). "Concerning the pharmacology of nutmeg". Mind: Psychiatry in General Practice: 299–303.
- Baker, A.W.; Shulgin, A.T. (1963). "Intramolecular hydrogen bonding in ortho trityl phenols". Spectrochimica Acta. 19 (9): 1611–1615. Bibcode:1963AcSpe..19.1611B. doi:10.1016/0371-1951(63)80020-X.
- Shulgin, A. T.; Baker, A. W. (1963). "Solvent Effects on the Claisen Rearrangement of β-Methylallyl Phenyl Ether". The Journal of Organic Chemistry. 28 (9): 2468–2469. doi:10.1021/jo01044a521. ISSN 0022-3263.
- Shulgin AT (March 1964). "3-Methoxy-4,5-methylenedioxy Amphetamine, a New Psychotomimetic Agent". Nature. 201 (4924): 1120–1121. Bibcode:1964Natur.201.1120S. doi:10.1038/2011120a0. PMID 14152788. Archived from the original on 2025-07-12.
- Shulgin, A. T. (1 April 1964). "Separation and Analysis of Methylated Phenols as Their Trifluoroacetate Ester Derivatives". Analytical Chemistry. 36 (4): 920–921. doi:10.1021/ac60210a001. ISSN 0003-2700.
- Shulgin AT (July 1964). "Psychotomimetic amphetamines: methoxy 3,4-dialkoxyamphetamines". Experientia. 20 (7): 366–367. doi:10.1007/BF02147960. PMID 5855670. Archived from the original on 2025-07-12.
- Shulgin, A. T.; Kerlinger, H. O. (1964). "Isolation of methoxyeugenol andtrans-isoelemicin from oil of nutmeg". Die Naturwissenschaften. 51 (15): 360–361. Bibcode:1964NW.....51..360S. doi:10.1007/BF00637880. ISSN 0028-1042. Archived from the original on 2025-07-12.
- Baker, A.W.; Shulgin, A.T. (1964). "Conformers of o-cis-propenyl phenols". Spectrochimica Acta. 20 (2): 153–158. Bibcode:1964AcSpe..20..153B. doi:10.1016/0371-1951(64)80004-7.
- Baker, A.W.; Kerlinger, H.O.; Shulgin, A.T. (1964). "Temperature dependency of phenol νOH band absorptivities. Applications to enthalpy calculations". Spectrochimica Acta. 20 (10): 1467–1476. doi:10.1016/0371-1951(64)80129-6.
- Baker, A.W.; Kerlinger, H.O.; Shulgin, A.T. (1964). "The hydroxyl stretching bands of phenols: some aspects of half-band widths". Spectrochimica Acta. 20 (10): 1477–1486. Bibcode:1964AcSpe..20.1477B. doi:10.1016/0371-1951(64)80130-2.
- Shulgin, A. T. (1964). "The reactions of cis-cis-tetrachloromuconic acid in solution". Recueil des Travaux Chimiques des Pays-Bas. 83 (9): 897–900. doi:10.1002/recl.19640830904. ISSN 0165-0513.
- Kaeding, W. W.; Shulgin, A. T.; Kenaga, E. E. (1965). "Carbamate Insecticides, Alkyl- and Amino-Substituted Phenyl N-Methylcarbamate Insecticides". Journal of Agricultural and Food Chemistry. 13 (3): 215–218. Bibcode:1965JAFC...13..215K. doi:10.1021/jf60139a007. ISSN 0021-8561.
- Shulgin, Alexander T. (1 December 1965). "Synthesis of the trimethoxyphenylpropenes". Canadian Journal of Chemistry. 43 (12): 3437–3440. doi:10.1139/v65-478. ISSN 0008-4042. Archived from the original on 2025-07-12.
- Shulgin, Alexander T.; Kerlinger, Herbert O. (1965). "The structures of the photochemical decomposition products of 2,5-di-t-butyl-p-benzoquinone". Tetrahedron Letters. 6 (38): 3355–3359. doi:10.1016/S0040-4039(00)71067-7.
- Baker, A. W.; Shulgin, A. T. (1965). "Preferred Repulsive Interaction: a Novel Halogen–Hydroxyl Interaction". Nature. 206 (4985): 712–713. Bibcode:1965Natur.206..712B. doi:10.1038/206712a0. ISSN 0028-0836.
- Baker, A. W.; Shulgin, A. T. (1 March 1965). "Enthalpies of Intramolecular Halogen–Hydroxyl Interactions". Canadian Journal of Chemistry. 43 (3): 650–659. doi:10.1139/v65-083. ISSN 0008-4042.
- Shulgin AT (April 1966). "Possible implication of myristicin as a psychotropic substance". Nature. 210 (5034): 380–384. Bibcode:1966Natur.210..380S. doi:10.1038/210380a0. PMID 5336379. Archived from the original on 2025-07-12.
- Shulgin AT (May 1966). "The six trimethoxyphenylisopropylamines (trimethoxyamphetamines)". J Med Chem. 9 (3): 445–446. doi:10.1021/jm00321a058. PMID 5960939. Archived from the original on 2025-07-12.
- Shulgin AT, Sargent T, Naranjo C (December 1966). "Role of 3,4-dimethoxyphenethylamine in schizophrenia". Nature. 212 (5070): 1606–1607. Bibcode:1966Natur.212.1606S. doi:10.1038/2121606a0. PMID 21105535. Archived from the original on 2025-07-12.
- Baker, A.W.; Shulgin, T. (1966). "Solvent stabilization of conformers in o-iodophenol". Spectrochimica Acta. 22 (1): 95–105. Bibcode:1966AcSpe..22...95B. doi:10.1016/0371-1951(66)80013-9.
- Shulgin, A. T.; Kerlinger, H. O. (1966). "The carbonyl double bond: a new hydrogen bond receptor". Chemical Communications (9): 249. doi:10.1039/c19660000249. ISSN 0009-241X.
- Shulgin AT, Sargent T (September 1967). "Psychotrophic phenylisopropylamines derived from apiole and dillapiole". Nature. 215 (5109): 1494–1495. Bibcode:1967Natur.215.1494S. doi:10.1038/2151494b0. PMID 4861200. Archived from the original on 2025-07-12.
- Sargent TW, Israelstam DM, Shulgin AT, Landaw SA, Finley NN (October 1967). "A note concerning the fate of the 4-methoxyl group in 3,4-dimethoxyphenethylamine (DMPEA)". Biochem Biophys Res Commun. 29 (1): 126–130. Bibcode:1967BBRC...29..126S. doi:10.1016/0006-291x(67)90552-9. PMID 6055178. Archived from the original on 2025-07-12.
- Shulgin AT, Sargent T, Naranjo C (December 1967). "The chemistry and psychopharmacology of nutmeg and of several related phenylisopropylamines". Psychopharmacol Bull. 4 (3): 13. PMID 5615546. Archived from the original on 2025-07-08.
- Shulgin, Alexander T. (1967). "The separation and identification of the components of the aromatic ether fraction of essential oils by gas-liquid chromatography". Journal of Chromatography A. 30: 54–61. doi:10.1016/S0021-9673(00)84112-6. Archived from the original on 2025-07-12.
- Naranjo C, Shulgin AT, Sargent T (1967). "Evaluation of 3,4-methylenedioxyamphetamine (MDA) as an adjunct to psychotherapy". Med Pharmacol Exp Int J Exp Med. 17 (4): 359–364. doi:10.1159/000137100. PMID 5631047. Archived from the original on 2025-07-12.
- Shulgin, Alexander T. (1 January 1968). "Convenient synthesis of myristicinaldehyde". Canadian Journal of Chemistry. 46 (1): 75–77. doi:10.1139/v68-013. ISSN 0008-4042. Archived from the original on 2025-07-12.
- Shulgin AT (January 1968). "The ethyl homologs of 2,4,5-trimethoxyphenylisopropylamine". J Med Chem. 11 (1): 186–187. doi:10.1021/jm00307a056. PMID 5637180. Archived from the original on 2025-07-12.
- Shulgin, Alexander T. (1968). "Recent Developments in Cannabis Chemistry". Journal of Psychedelic Drugs. 2 (1): 15–29. doi:10.1080/02791072.1968.10524397. ISSN 0022-393X. Archived from the original on 2025-07-12.
- Shulgin, Alexander T. (1969). "Psychotomimetic Agents Related to the Catecholamines". Journal of Psychedelic Drugs. 2 (2): 14–19. doi:10.1080/02791072.1969.10524409. ISSN 0022-393X. Archived from the original on 2025-07-12.
- Shulgin AT, Sargent T, Naranjo C (February 1969). "Structure–activity relationships of one-ring psychotomimetics". Nature. 221 (5180): 537–541. Bibcode:1969Natur.221..537S. doi:10.1038/221537a0. PMID 5789297. Archived from the original on 2025-07-12.
- Shulgin AT, Sargent T, Naranjo C (February 1969). "Erratum: Structure–activity relationships of one-ring psychotomimetics: Correction". Nature. 221 (5182): 786. doi:10.1038/221786f0. Archived from the original on 2025-07-12.
- Shulgin AT (21 July 1969). "12781j Substituted α-Methyl-β-Phenylethylamines as Central Nervous System Stimulants". Chemical Abstracts. 7 (3): 293. Archived from the original on 2025-07-12.

=== 1970s ===
- Shulgin AT (1970). "The Mode of Action of Psychotomimetic Drugs: XI. Some Qualitative Properties of the Psychotomimetics". Neurosciences Research Program Bulletin. 8 (1): 72–78. Archived from the original on 2025-07-06.
- Snyder SH, Shulgin AT (January 1970). "The Mode of Action of Psychotomimetic Drugs: XIV. Steric and Quantum Chemical Characteristics". Neurosciences Research Program Bulletin. 8 (1): 86–89. Archived from the original on 2025-07-12.
- Snyder SH, Shulgin AT, Green JP, Beveridge DL (January 1970). "The Mode of Action of Psychotomimetic Drugs: XV. Quantum Theory: Discussion". Neurosciences Research Program Bulletin. 8 (1): 90–106. Archived from the original on 2025-07-12.
- Smythies JR, Shulgin AT (January 1970). "Structure-Activity Relations". Neurosciences Research Program Bulletin. 8 (1): 82–85. Archived from the original on 2025-07-06.
- Shulgin AT, Sargent T, Naranjo C (1971). "4-Bromo-2,5-dimethoxyphenylisopropylamine, a new centrally active amphetamine analog". Pharmacology. 5 (2): 103–107. doi:10.1159/000136181. PMID 5570923. Archived from the original on 2025-07-12.
- Shulgin AT (1971). "Preliminary studies of the synthesis of nitrogen analogs of Δ1-THC". Acta Pharm Suecia. 8: 680–681. Archived from the original on 2025-07-12.
- Shulgin AT (March 1973). "Stereospecific requirements for hallucinogenesis". J Pharm Pharmacol. 25 (3): 271–272. doi:10.1111/j.2042-7158.1973.tb10642.x. PMID 4146335. Archived from the original on 2025-07-12.
- Shulgin AT (1973). "The narcotic pepper: the chemistry and pharmacology of Piper methysticum and related species". Bulletin of Narcotics. 25 (2): 59–74.
- Shulgin AT (1973). "Le Poivre Stupefiant - Chemie et Pharmacologie du 'Piper methysticum' et des Especes Apparentees" [The Narcotic Pepper - The Chemistry and Pharmacology of 'Piper methysticum' and Related Species]. Bulletin de Stupefiants. 25 (2): 61–77.
- Shulgin AT, Sargent T, Naranjo C (1973). "Animal pharmacology and human psychopharmacology of 3-methoxy-4,5-methylenedioxyphenylisopropylamine (MMDA)". Pharmacology. 10 (1): 12–18. doi:10.1159/000136416. PMID 4751535. Archived from the original on 2025-07-12.
- Shulgin AT (March 1973). "Mescaline: the chemistry and pharmacology of its analogs". Lloydia. 36 (1): 46–58. PMID 4576313. Archived from the original on 2025-07-12.
- Kalbhen DA, Sargent T, Shulgin AT, Braun G, Stauffer H, Kusubov N, Nohr ML (January 1974). "Human pharmacodynamics of the psychodysleptic 4-bromo-2,5-dimethoxy-phenylisopropylamine labelled with 82Br". IRCS (Research on Clinical Pharmacology and Therapeutics). 2: 1091. OSTI 6312452. Archived from the original on 2025-07-12.
- Shulgin AT (1975). "Drugs of Abuse in the Future". Clin Toxicol. 8 (4): 405–456. doi:10.3109/15563657508990076. PMID 1220895. Archived from the original on 2025-07-12.
- Shulgin AT, Carter MF (1975). "Centrally active phenethylamines". Psychopharmacol Commun. 1 (1): 93–98. PMID 1223994. Archived from the original on 2025-07-12.
- Shulgin AT, Helisten C (1975). "Differentiation of PCP, TCP, and a contaminating precursor PCC, by thin layer chromatography". Microgram. 8: 171–172.
- Alexander T. Shulgin (October 1975). "Drug Use and Anti-Drug Legislation". The PharmChem Newsletter. 4 (8): 1–2. Archived from the original on 2025-07-12.
- Shulgin AT, Dyer DC (December 1975). "Psychotomimetic phenylisopropylamines. 5. 4-Alkyl-2,5-dimethoxyphenylisopropylamines". J Med Chem. 18 (12): 1201–1204. doi:10.1021/jm00246a006. PMID 1195275. Archived from the original on 2025-07-12.
- Sargent T, Kalbhen DA, Shulgin AT, Braun G, Stauffer H, Kusubov N (March 1975). "In Vivo Human Pharmacodynamics of the Psychodysleptic 4-Br-2,5-Dimethoxyphenylisopropylamine Labelled With ^{82}Br or ^{77}Br". Neuropharmacology. 14 (3): 165–174. doi:10.1016/0028-3908(75)90001-5. PMID 806031. Archived from the original on 2025-07-12.
- Sargent T, Kalbhen DA, Shulgin AT, Stauffer H, Kusubov N (March 1975). "A potential new brain-scanning agent: 4-77Br-2,5-dimethoxyphenylisoproplamine (4-Br-DPIA)". J Nucl Med. 16 (3): 243–245. PMID 1113176. Archived from the original on 2025-07-12.
- Jacob P, Callery PS, Shulgin AT, Castagnoli N (October 1976). "A convenient synthesis of quinones from hydroquinone dimethyl ethers. Oxidative demethylation with ceric ammonijm nitrate". J Org Chem. 41 (22): 3627–3629. doi:10.1021/jo00884a035. PMID 985642. Archived from the original on 2025-07-12.
- Shulgin, Alexander T. (1976). "Profiles of Psychedelic Drugs: 1. DMT & 2. TMA-2". Journal of Psychedelic Drugs. 8 (2): 167–169. doi:10.1080/02791072.1976.10471846. ISSN 0022-393X.
- Shulgin AT, Mac Lean DE (1976). "Illicit synthesis of phencyclidine (PCP) and several of its analogs". Clin Toxicol. 9 (4): 553–560. doi:10.3109/15563657608988157. PMID 975751. Archived from the original on 2025-07-12.
- Standridge RT, Howell HG, Gylys JA, Partyka RA, Shulgin AT (December 1976). "Phenylakylamines with potential psychotherapeutic utility. 1. 2-Amino-1-(2,5-dimethoxy-4-methylphenyl)butane". J Med Chem. 19 (12): 1400–1404. doi:10.1021/jm00234a010. PMID 1003425. Archived from the original on 2025-07-12.
- Nichols DE, Shulgin AT (October 1976). "Sulfur analogs of psychotomimetic amines". J Pharm Sci. 65 (10): 1554–1556. Bibcode:1976JPhmS..65.1554S. doi:10.1002/jps.2600651040. PMID 978423. Archived from the original on 2025-07-12.
- Sargent T, Shulgin AT, Kusubov N (1976). "Quantitative measurement of demethylation of 14C-methoxyl labeled DMPEA and TMA-2 in rats". Psychopharmacol Commun. 2 (3): 199–206. PMID 996275. Archived from the original on 2025-07-12.
- Shulgin AT (1976). "Editorial. Abuse of the term "amphetamines"". Clin Toxicol. 9 (3): 351–352. doi:10.3109/15563657608988135. PMID 986284. Archived from the original on 2025-07-12.
- Helisten C, Shulgin AT (February 1976). "The detection of 1-piperidinocyclohexanecarbonitrile contamination in illicit preparations of 1-(1-phenylcyclohexyl)piperidine and 1-[1-(2-thienyl)-cyclohexyl]piperidine". J Chromatogr. 117 (1): 232–235. doi:10.1016/s0021-9673(00)81090-0. PMID 1249153. Archived from the original on 2025-07-12.
- Shulgin, Alexander T. (1976). "Profiles of Psychedelic Drugs: 3. MMDA". Journal of Psychedelic Drugs. 8 (4): 331. doi:10.1080/02791072.1976.10471859. ISSN 0022-393X. Archived from the original on 2025-07-12.
- Shulgin AT (1976). "Letter: On the term "amphetamines"". Clin Toxicol. 9 (3): 449. doi:10.3109/15563657608988144. PMID 954373. Archived from the original on 2025-07-12.
- Jacob P, Meshul C, Shulgin A, Castagnoli N (January 1976). "Syntheses of 3 thio-analogs of 2,4,5-trimethoxyphenylisopropylamine-enantiomeric differences in brain levels following administration of racemates". Abstracts of Papers of the American Chemical Society. 172 (SEP 3): 13.
- Nichols DE, Shulgin AT, Dyer DC (August 1977). "Directional lipophilic character in a series of psychotomimetic phenethylamine derivatives". Life Sci. 21 (4): 569–575. doi:10.1016/0024-3205(77)90099-6. PMID 904435. Archived from the original on 2025-07-12.
- Braun U, Shulgin AT, Braun G, Sargent T (December 1977). "Synthesis and body distribution of several iodine-131 labeled centrally acting drugs". J Med Chem. 20 (12): 1543–1546. doi:10.1021/jm00222a001. PMID 592317. Archived from the original on 2025-07-12.
- Jacob P, Anderson G, Meshul CK, Shulgin AT, Castagnoli N (October 1977). "Monomethylthio analogues of 1-(2,4,5-trimethoxyphenyl)-2-aminopropane". J Med Chem. 20 (10): 1235–1239. doi:10.1021/jm00220a001. PMID 903913. Archived from the original on 2025-07-12.
- Shulgin, Alexander T. (1977). "Profiles of Psychedelic Drugs: 4. Harmaline". Journal of Psychedelic Drugs. 9 (1): 79–80. doi:10.1080/02791072.1977.10472029. ISSN 0022-393X. Archived from the original on 2025-07-12.
- Shulgin, Alexander T. (1977). "Profiles of Psychedelic Drugs: 5. STP". Journal of Psychedelic Drugs. 9 (2): 171–172. doi:10.1080/02791072.1977.10472044. ISSN 0022-393X. Archived from the original on 2025-07-12.
- White, T.J.; Goodman, D.; Shulgin, A.T.; Castagnoli, N.; Lee, R.; Petrakis, N.L. (1977). "Mutagenic activity of some centrally active aromatic amines in Salmonella typhimurium". Mutation Research/Fundamental and Molecular Mechanisms of Mutagenesis. 56 (2): 199–202. Bibcode:1977MRFMM..56..199W. doi:10.1016/0027-5107(77)90210-X. Archived from the original on 2025-07-12.
- Sargent T, Budinger TF, Braun G, Shulgin AT, Braun U (January 1978). "An iodinated catecholamine congener for brain imaging and metabolic studies". J Nucl Med. 19 (1): 71–76. PMID 413888. Archived from the original on 2025-07-12.
- Murdock JE, Patty JR, Shulgin AT (June 1978). "A Novel Illicit Amphetamine Laboratory". Microgram. 11 (6): 98–101.
- Braun, Gisela; Shulgin, Alexander T.; Sargent, Thornton (1978). "Synthesis of 123I-labelled 4-iodo-2,5-dimethoxyphenylisopropylamine". Journal of Labelled Compounds and Radiopharmaceuticals. 14 (5): 767–773. doi:10.1002/jlcr.2580140515. ISSN 0362-4803. Archived from the original on 2025-07-12.
- Sargent T, Braun G, Braun U, Budinger TF, Shulgin AT (1978). "Brain and retina uptake of a radio-iodine labeled psychotomimetic in dog and monkey". Commun Psychopharmacol. 2 (1): 1–10. PMID 95919. Archived from the original on 2025-07-12.
- Shulgin AT, Braun U, Braun G (January 1978). "N-substituted analogs of 3,4-methylenedioxyphenylisopropylamine". Abstracts of Papers of the American Chemical Society. 175 (MAR): 14.
- Shulgin AT (1979). "Chemistry of phenethylamines related to mescaline". J Psychedelic Drugs. 11 (1–2): 41–52. doi:10.1080/02791072.1979.10472091. PMID 522167. Archived from the original on 2025-07-12.
- Glennon RA, Kier LB, Shulgin AT (July 1979). "Molecular connectivity analysis of hallucinogenic mescaline analogs". J Pharm Sci. 68 (7): 906–907. Bibcode:1979JPhmS..68..906G. doi:10.1002/jps.2600680733. PMID 458614. Archived from the original on 2025-07-12.
- Shulgin, Alexander T. (1979). "Profiles of Psychedelic Drugs: 6. α,O-DMS". Journal of Psychedelic Drugs. 11 (3): 247. doi:10.1080/02791072.1979.10472112. ISSN 0022-393X. Archived from the original on 2025-07-12.
- Shulgin, Alexander T. (1979). "Profiles of Psychedelic Drugs: 7. Mescaline". Journal of Psychedelic Drugs. 11 (4): 355. doi:10.1080/02791072.1979.10471421. ISSN 0022-393X. PMID 522178. Archived from the original on 2025-07-12.
- Braun G, Shulgin A, Sargent T (January 1979). "Synthesis and brain uptake of I-123-labeled 4-iodo-2,5-dimethoxyphenylisopropylamine". Journal of Labelled Compounds & Radiopharmaceuticals. 16 (1): 44–45.

=== 1980s ===
- Braun U, Shulgin AT, Braun G (February 1980). "Centrally active N-substituted analogs of 3,4-methylenedioxyphenylisopropylamine (3,4-methylenedioxyamphetamine)". J Pharm Sci. 69 (2): 192–195. Bibcode:1980JPhmS..69..192B. doi:10.1002/jps.2600690220. PMID 6102141. Archived from the original on 2025-07-12.
- Shulgin AT (1980). "Profiles of Psychedelic Drugs: 8. Psilocybin". J Psychedelic Drugs. 12 (1): 79. doi:10.1080/02791072.1980.10471557. PMID 7392062. Archived from the original on 2025-07-12.
- Kantor RE, Dudlettes SD, Shulgin AT (April 1980). "5-Methoxy-α-Methyltryptamine (α,O-Dimethylserotonin), A Hallucinogenic Homolog of Serotonin". Biol Psychiatry. 15 (2): 349–352. PMID 7417623. Archived from the original on 2025-07-12.
- Standridge RT, Howell HG, Tilson HA, Chamberlain JH, Holava HM, Gylys JA, Partyka RA, Shulgin AT (February 1980). "Phenylalkylamines with potential psychotherapeutic utility. 2. Nuclear substituted 2-amino-1-phenylbutanes". J Med Chem. 23 (2): 154–162. doi:10.1021/jm00176a010. PMID 7359529. Archived from the original on 2025-07-12.
- Shulgin AT (1980). "Profiles of Psychedelic Drugs: 9. LSD". J Psychedelic Drugs. 12 (2): 173–174. doi:10.1080/02791072.1980.10471571. PMID 7420434. Archived from the original on 2025-07-12.
- Braun U, Shulgin AT, Braun G (1980). "Prüfung auf zentrale Aktivität und Analgesie von N-substituierten Analogen des Amphetamin-Derivates 3,4-Methylendioxyphenylisopropylamin" [Study on the CNS Activity and Analgesia of the N-Substituted Analogs of the Amphetamine Derivative 3,4- Methylenedioxyphenylisopropylamine]. Arzneimittelforschung (in German). 30 (5): 825–830. PMID 7190428. Archived from the original on 2025-07-12.
- Shulgin AT, Carter MF (1980). "N,N-Diisopropyltryptamine (DIPT) and 5-methoxy-N,N-diisopropyltryptamine (5-MeO-DIPT). Two orally active tryptamine analogs with CNS activity". Commun Psychopharmacol. 4 (5): 363–369. PMID 6949674. Archived from the original on 2025-07-12.
- Shulgin A (1981). "Profiles of Psychedelic Drugs: 10. DOB". J Psychoactive Drugs. 13 (1): 99. doi:10.1080/02791072.1981.10471457. PMID 7277091. Archived from the original on 2025-07-12.
- Domelsmith LN, Eaton TA, Houk KN, Anderson GM, Glennon RA, Shulgin AT, Castagnoli N, Kollman PA (December 1981). "Photoelectron spectra of psychotropic drugs. 6. Relationships between the physical properties and pharmacological actions of amphetamine analogues". J Med Chem. 24 (12): 1414–1421. doi:10.1021/jm00144a009. PMID 7310818. Archived from the original on 2025-07-12.
- Jacob P, Shulgin AT (November 1981). "Sulfur analogues of psychotomimetic agents. Monothio analogues of mescaline and isomescaline". J Med Chem. 24 (11): 1348–1353. doi:10.1021/jm00143a017. PMID 7310812. Archived from the original on 2025-07-12.
- Jacob, Peyton; Shulgin, Alexander T. (1981). "The Synthesis of Hydroxybenzaldehydes from Bromobenzaldehydes via Lithiated Schiff's Bases. Preparation of 5-Hydroxypiperonal and Related Compounds". Synthetic Communications. 11 (12): 969–977. doi:10.1080/00397918108065756. ISSN 0039-7911. Archived from the original on 2025-07-12.
- Shulgin AT (1981). "Profiles of Psychedelic Drugs: 11. Bufotenine". J Psychoactive Drugs. 13 (4): 389. doi:10.1080/02791072.1981.10471899. PMID 28557697. Archived from the original on 2025-07-12.
- Iii, Peyton Jacob; Shulgin, Alexander T. (1981). "Metallation - Sulfidation: A Convenient Method for the Synthesis of Aryl Alkyl Sulfides and of Unsymmetrical Diaryl Sulfides". Synthetic Communications. 11 (12): 957–968. doi:10.1080/00397918108065755. ISSN 0039-7911. Archived from the original on 2025-07-12.
- Cheng, Alice C.; Shulgin, Alexander T.; Castagnoli, Neal (1982). "Studies on the chemical reactivity of the quinone methide derived from the oxidative cyclization of α-methyl-3,4-dihydroxyphenylalanine ethyl ester". The Journal of Organic Chemistry. 47 (27): 5258–5262. doi:10.1021/jo00148a007. ISSN 0022-3263.
- Shulgin AT, Jacob P (1982). "Potential misrepresentation of 3,4-methylenedioxyamphetamine (MDA). A toxicological warning". J Anal Toxicol. 6 (2): 71–75. doi:10.1093/jat/6.2.71. PMID 7098452. Archived from the original on 2025-07-12.
- Shulgin AT, Jacob P (March 1982). "1-(3,4-methylenedioxyphenyl)-3-aminobutane: a potential toxicological problem". J Toxicol Clin Toxicol. 19 (1): 109–110. doi:10.3109/15563658208990371. PMID 7154137. Archived from the original on 2025-07-12.
- Sargent T, Shulgin AT, Mathis C, Budinger TF (1982). "A new iodo-amphetamine for rapid positron tomographic measurement of brain blood flow with 122I". Nuclear Medicine and Biology. 1: 646–649.
- Sargent T, Shulgin AT, Mathis CA (1982). "New iodinated amphetamines by rapid synthesis for use as brain blood flow indicators". Journal of Labelled Compounds and Radiopharmaceuticals. 19 (11–12): 1307–1308. doi:10.1002/jlcr.2580191102. Archived from the original on 2025-07-12.
- Jacob P, Shulgin AT (May 1983). "Sulfur analogues of psychotomimetic agents. 2. Analogues of (2,5-dimethoxy-4-methylphenyl)-and (2,5-dimethoxy-4-ethylphenyl)isopropylamine". J Med Chem. 26 (5): 746–752. doi:10.1021/jm00359a021. PMID 6842515. Archived from the original on 2025-07-12.
- Sargent T, Shulgin AT, Mathis CA, Budinger TF (1983). "New blood flow radiopharmaceutical (No. LBL—14986)". Biology and Medicine Division Annual Report. 1981–1982: 9–10.
- Jacob P, Savanapridi C, Yu L, Wilson M, Shulgin AT, Benowitz NL, Elias-Baker BA, Hall SM, Herning RI, Jones RT (August 1984). "Ion-pair extraction of thiocyanate from plasma and its gas chromatographic determination using on-column alkylation". Anal Chem. 56 (9): 1692–1695. doi:10.1021/ac00273a036. PMID 6486450.
- Sargent T, Shulgin AT, Mathis CA (August 1984). "Radiohalogen-labeled imaging agents. 3. Compounds for measurement of brain blood flow by emission tomography". J Med Chem. 27 (8): 1071–1077. doi:10.1021/jm00374a023. PMID 6611416. Archived from the original on 2025-07-12.
- Jacob P, Shulgin AT (July 1984). "Sulfur analogues of psychotomimetic agents. 3. Ethyl homologues of mescaline and their monothio analogues". J Med Chem. 27 (7): 881–888. doi:10.1021/jm00373a013. PMID 6737431. Archived from the original on 2025-07-12.
- Repke DB, Grotjahn DB, Shulgin AT (July 1985). "Psychotomimetic N-methyl-N-isopropyltryptamines. Effects of variation of aromatic oxygen substituents". J Med Chem. 28 (7): 892–896. doi:10.1021/jm00145a007. PMID 4009612. Archived from the original on 2025-07-12.
- Mathis CA, Sargent T, Shulgin AT (November 1985). "Iodine-122-labeled amphetamine derivative with potential for PET brain blood-flow studies". J Nucl Med. 26 (11): 1295–1301. PMID 3877152. Archived from the original on 2025-07-12.
- Lemaire D, Jacob P, Shulgin AT (August 1985). "Ring-substituted β-methoxyphenethylamines: a new class of psychotomimetic agents active in man". J Pharm Pharmacol. 37 (8): 575–577. doi:10.1111/j.2042-7158.1985.tb03072.x. PMID 2864422. Archived from the original on 2025-07-12.
- Mathis CA, Sargent T, Shulgin AT, Yano Y, Budinger TF, Lagunas-Solar M (1985). "Synthesis and evaluation of meta-substituted I-122-labeled dimethoxy-N,N-dimethylamphetamines for brain imaging studies". Journal of Nuclear Medicine. 26 (5): 69. Archived from the original on 2025-07-12.
- Shulgin A (1985). "What is MDMA?". PharmChem Newsletter. 14 (3): 3–5, 10, 11. Archived from the original on 12 July 2025.
- Mathis CA, Budinger TF, Sargent T, Shulgin AT, Kung HF (1985). "Generator produced I-122 labeled amines and diamines for brain blood flow measurements in neurologic disorders". Journal of Nuclear Medicine. 26 (5): 105. Archived from the original on 2025-07-12.
- Sargent T, Mathis CA, Shulgin AT, Yano Y (1985). "Iodine-122 brain-blood-flow radiopharmaceutical (No. LBL—18393)". Biology and Medicine Division Annual Report. 1983–1984: 7–8.
- Shulgin AT (1986). "The Background and Chemistry of MDMA". J Psychoactive Drugs. 18 (4): 291–304. doi:10.1080/02791072.1986.10472361. PMID 2880943. Archived from the original on 2025-07-12.
- Nichols DE, Hoffman AJ, Oberlender RA, Jacob P, Shulgin AT (October 1986). "Derivatives of 1-(1,3-benzodioxol-5-yl)-2-butanamine: representatives of a novel therapeutic class". J Med Chem. 29 (10): 2009–2015. doi:10.1021/jm00160a035. PMID 3761319. Archived from the original on 2025-07-12.
- Jacob P, Benowitz NL, Yu L, Shulgin AT (September 1986). "Determination of nicotine N-oxide by gas chromatography following thermal conversion to 2-methyl-6-(3-pyridyl)tetrahydro-1,2-oxazine". Anal Chem. 58 (11): 2218–2221. doi:10.1021/ac00124a022. PMID 3766974.
- Shulgin AT, Shulgin LA, Jacob P (May 1986). "A protocol for the evaluation of new psychoactive drugs in man". Methods Find Exp Clin Pharmacol. 8 (5): 313–320. PMID 3724306. Archived from the original on 2025-07-12.
- Mathis, Chester A.; Shulgin, Alexander T.; Sargent, Thornton (1986). "Synthesis of 122I- and 125I-labelled meta-dimethoxy-N,N-dimethyliodophenylisopropylamines". Journal of Labelled Compounds and Radiopharmaceuticals. 23 (2): 115–125. doi:10.1002/jlcr.2580230202. ISSN 0362-4803. Archived from the original on 2025-07-12.
- Mathis CA, Moerlein SM, Yano Y, Shulgin AT, Hanson RN, Kung HF (1986). "Rapid labeling of radiopharmaceuticals with iodine-122". Journal of Labelled Compounds and Radiopharmaceuticals. 23 (10–12): 1259–1261.
- Mathis CA, Shulgin Y, Yano Y, Sargent T (1986). "18F-labelled N,N-dimethylamphetamine analogues for brain imaging studies". Int J Rad Appl Instrum A. 37 (8): 865–872. doi:10.1016/0883-2889(86)90284-4. PMID 3021683. Archived from the original on 2025-07-12.
- Brown CR, McKinney H, Osterloh JD, Shulgin A, Peyton J, Olson KR (October 1986). "91. Severe adverse reaction to 3,4-methylenedioxymethamphetamine (MDMA)". Veterinary and Human Toxicology. 28 (5): 490. Archived from the original on 2025-07-07.
- Shulgin A (September 1986). "History and Analysis of the Current Federal Controlled Substances Act of 1970". Journal of the Forensic Science Society. 26 (5): 371. doi:10.1016/S0015-7368(86)72520-6.
- Shulgin A (September 1986). "The Controlled Substances Act - Scheduled Drugs and Their Illegal Synthesis". Abstracts of the American Chemical Society. 192: 10–CHAL.
- McKenna DJ, Mathis CA, Shulgin AT, Sargent T, Saavedra JM (June 1987). "Autoradiographic localization of binding sites for 125I-DOI, a new psychotomimetic radioligand, in the rat brain". Eur J Pharmacol. 137 (2–3): 289–290. doi:10.1016/0014-2999(87)90239-1. PMID 3609149. Archived from the original on 2025-07-13.
- Mathis CA, Shulgin AT, Moerlein SM, Yano Y, Brennan KM, Seargent T, Budinger TF (1987). "Use of generator-produced 122I for studies of heart and brain function (No. LBL—22300)". Biology and Medicine Divisions: Annual Report. 1986: 25–30.
- Shulgin AT, Jacob P, Benowitz NL, Lau D (December 1987). "Identification and quantitative analysis of cotinine-N-oxide in human urine". J Chromatogr. 423: 365–372. doi:10.1016/0378-4347(87)80365-1. PMID 3443673.
- McKenna DJ, Mathis CA, Shulgin AT, Saavedra JM (1987). "311.14. Hallucinogens bind to common receptors in the rat forebrain: a comparative study using 125I-LSD and 125I-DOI, a new psychotomimetic radioligand". Neuroscience Abstracts. 13: 1131. Archived from the original on 2025-07-07.
- Shulgin AT (1987). "Reference Information On MDMA". Analog. 9 (4): 10.
- Alexander T. Shulgin (January 1988). "DIPT: The Distortion of Music". High Frontiers/Reality Hackers. 6: 27. Archived from the original on 2025-07-13.
- Jacob P, Benowitz NL, Shulgin AT (May 1988). "Recent studies of nicotine metabolism in humans". Pharmacol Biochem Behav. 30 (1): 249–253. doi:10.1016/0091-3057(88)90453-4. PMID 3174750.
- Jacob, Peyton; Benowitz, Neal L.; Shulgin, Alexander T. (1988). "Synthesis of optically pure deuterium-labelled nicotine, nornicotine and cotinine". Journal of Labelled Compounds and Radiopharmaceuticals. 25 (10): 1117–1128. doi:10.1002/jlcr.2580251009. ISSN 0362-4803.
- Mathis, C. A.; Hoffman, A. J.; Nichols, D. E.; Shulgin, A. T. (1988). "Synthesis of high specific activity 125I- and 123I-labelled enantiomers of 2,5-dimethoxy-4-iodophenylisopropylamine (DOI)". Journal of Labelled Compounds and Radiopharmaceuticals. 25 (11): 1255–1265. doi:10.1002/jlcr.2580251112. ISSN 0362-4803.
- Gerdes, John M.; Mathis, Chester A.; Shulgin, Alexander T. (1988). "Synthesis of 1-[2′,5′-dimethoxy-4′-(β-fluoroethyl)phenyl]-2-aminopropane:studies related to 18F-labeled serotonin receptor ligands". Tetrahedron Letters. 29 (50): 6537–6539. doi:10.1016/S0040-4039(00)82391-6. Archived from the original on 2025-07-13.
- Shulgin A (July 1988). "Development of a Drug Database: Hypercard is Valuable in the Construction of an Intuitively Usable and Quickly Distributed Source of Reference Material". Journal of the Forensic Science Society. 28 (4): 268. doi:10.1016/S0015-7368(88)72845-5.
- Gerdes J, Mathis C, Shulgin A (September 1988). "Synthesis of (±)-1-[2,5-dimethoxy-4-(β-fluoroethyl)phenyl]-2-aminopropane - An approach to F-18-labeled serotonin receptor probes (meeting abstract 394-ORGN)". Abstracts of Papers of the American Chemical Society. 196: 394–ORGN.
- Mathis CA, Gerdes JM, Shulgin AT, Nichols DE (April 1989). "Radiohalogenated amphetamine analogs for blood flow and serotonin receptor studies". American Chemical Society, Division of Nuclear Chemistry and Technology, National Meeting: 9–14.
- Mathis, C.A.; Gerdes, J.M.; Shulgin, A.T.; Hoffman, A.J.; Nichols, D.E. (1989). "Synthesis of high specific activity radiohalogenated amphetamine analogues for studies of the serotonin 5-HT 2 receptor". Journal of Labelled Compounds and Radiopharmaceuticals. 26 (1–12): 130–132. doi:10.1002/jlcr.2580260157. ISSN 0362-4803.
- Jacob P, Jones RT, Benowitz NL, Shulgin AT (February 1989). "Cocaine smokers inhale a pyrolysis product - anhydroecgonine methyl ester". Clinical Pharmacology & Therapeutics. 45 (2): 186.
- Gerdes J, Mathis C, Shulgin A (1989). "Synthesis of 1-(2′,5′-Dimethoxy-4′-(β-fluoroethyl)phenyl)-2-aminopropane (III): Studies Related to 18F-Labeled Serotonin Receptor Ligands". ChemInform. 20 (26): no. doi:10.1002/chin.198926309.

=== 1990s ===
- Johnson MP, Mathis CA, Shulgin AT, Hoffman AJ, Nichols DE (January 1990). "[125I]-2-(2,5-dimethoxy-4-iodophenyl)aminoethane ([125I]-2C-I) as a label for the 5-HT2 receptor in rat frontal cortex". Pharmacol Biochem Behav. 35 (1): 211–217. doi:10.1016/0091-3057(90)90228-a. PMID 2315361. Archived from the original on 2025-07-13.
- Jacob P, Shulgin AT, Benowitz NL (July 1990). "Synthesis of (3'R,5'S)-trans-3'-hydroxycotinine, a major metabolite of nicotine. Metabolic formation of 3'-hydroxycotinine in humans is highly stereoselective" (PDF). J Med Chem. 33 (7): 1888–1891. doi:10.1021/jm00169a009. PMID 2362266.
- Mathis CA, Gerdes JM, Shulgin AT, Hanrahan S, Faggin B, Mailman R (1990). "Synthesis and evaluation of (S)-5-[125I]iodo-2,3-methylenedioxybenzamide". Synthesis and evaluation of (S)-5-[125I] iodo-2,3-methylenedioxybenzamide (No. DOE/ER/60968–1). p. 370.
- Jacob P, Jones RT, Benowitz NL, Shulgin AT, Lewis ER, Elias-Baker BA (1990). "Cocaine smokers excrete a pyrolysis product, anhydroecgonine methyl ester". J Toxicol Clin Toxicol. 28 (1): 121–125. doi:10.3109/15563659008993484. PMID 2381018. Archived from the original on 2025-07-13.
- Shulgin AT (1990). "How Similar Is Substantially Similar?". Journal of Forensic Sciences. 35 (1): 8–10. doi:10.1520/JFS12796J. Archived from the original on 2025-07-13.
- Shulgin AT (1991). "Confessions of a Psychedelic Alchemist". Whole Earth Review. Fall 1991: 22–27. Archived from the original on 2025-07-13.
- Shulgin, Alexander T.; Shulgin, Ann; Jacob, Peyton (January 1991). "Letters to the Editor [Re: Stolaroff (1990) - Central Nervous System (CNS) Activity of Two New Psychoactive Compounds]". Journal of Psychoactive Drugs. 23 (1): 95–97 (95–96). doi:10.1080/02791072.1991.10472583. eISSN 2159-9777. ISSN 0279-1072. PMID 1941371. Archived from the original on 2025-07-13.
- McKenna DJ, Guan XM, Shulgin AT (March 1991). "3,4-Methylenedioxyamphetamine (MDA) analogues exhibit differential effects on synaptosomal release of 3H-dopamine and 3H-5-hydroxytryptamine". Pharmacol Biochem Behav. 38 (3): 505–512. doi:10.1016/0091-3057(91)90005-m. PMID 1829838. Archived from the original on 2025-07-13.
- Shulgin AT (1991). "Designer drugs: Where we are, and where we are going". Journal of the Forensic Science Society. 31 (2): 231–232. doi:10.1016/S0015-7368(91)73146-0. Archived from the original on 2025-07-13.
- Gerdes JM, Mathis CA, Shulgin AT, Johnson MP, Nichols DE (1991). "Synthesis and Evaluation of 2,5-Dimethoxy-4-(Fluoroalkyl)amphetamines: Serotonin 5-HT2 Receptor Ligands". Journal of Medicinal Chemistry.
- Alexander T. Shulgin (January 1991). "Future Drugs: the Next 10 Years". The Drug Policy Letter: 8–10. Archived from the original on 2025-07-13.
- Jacob P, Shulgin AT, Yu L, Benowitz NL (December 1992). "Determination of the nicotine metabolite trans-3'-hydroxycotinine in urine of smokers using gas chromatography with nitrogen-selective detection or selected ion monitoring". J Chromatogr. 583 (2): 145–154. doi:10.1016/0378-4347(92)80547-4. PMID 1478978.
- Alexander T. Shulgin (January 1993). "Ayahuasca". Journal of the Clandestine Laboratory Investigating Chemists Association. 3 (1): 11.
- Jacob P, Yu L, Liang G, Shulgin AT, Benowitz NL (September 1993). "Gas chromatographic-mass spectrometric method for determination of anabasine, anatabine and other tobacco alkaloids in urine of smokers and smokeless tobacco users". J Chromatogr. 619 (1): 49–61. doi:10.1016/0378-4347(93)80445-a. PMID 8245163.
- Galloway G, Shulgin AT, Kornfeld H, Frederick SL (September 1995). "Amphetamine, not MDMA, is associated with intracranial hemorrhage". J Accid Emerg Med. 12 (3): 231–232. doi:10.1136/emj.12.3.231. PMC 1342496. PMID 8581263. Archived from the original on 2025-07-13.
- Gerdes, John M.; Keil, Robert N.; Shulgin, Alexander T.; Mathis, Chester A. (1996). "High pressure nucleophilic fluoride-ion substitution reactions: formation of fluoroalkylbenzenes". Journal of Fluorine Chemistry. 78 (2): 121–129. Bibcode:1996JFluC..78..121G. doi:10.1016/0022-1139(96)03417-3.
- Shulgin A (1997). "Química y destello vital" [Chemistry and vital spark]. Archipiélago. 28.
- Shulgin A (1997). "Los psicofármacos de diseño" [Designer psychotropic drugs]. Archipiélago: Cuadernos de crítica de la cultura. 28: 61–66.
- Parker MA, Marona-Lewicka D, Kurrasch D, Shulgin AT, Nichols DE (March 1998). "Synthesis and pharmacological evaluation of ring-methylated derivatives of 3,4-(methylenedioxy)amphetamine (MDA)". J Med Chem. 41 (6): 1001–1005. doi:10.1021/jm9705925. PMID 9526575. Archived from the original on 2025-07-13.
- Cozzi NV, Shulgin AT, Ruoho AE (April 1998). "Methcathinone (MCAT) and 2-methylamino-1-(3,4-methylenedioxyphenyl) propan-1-one (MDMCAT) inhibit [3H] serotonin uptake into human platelets". Abstract of Papers of the American Chemical Society. 215: U904. Archived from the original on 2025-07-13.
- Cozzi NV, Sievert MK, Shulgin AT, Jacob P, Ruoho AE (1998). "Methcathinone and 2 methylamino-1-(3,4-methylenedioxyphenyl) propan-1-one (methylone) selectively inhibit plasma membrane catecholamine reuptake transporters". Soc Neurosci Abstr. 24 (381.8). Archived from the original (PDF) on 13 July 2025.
- Alexander T. Shulgin (10 March 1998). "Spoils of the Drug War". San Jose Mercury News. Archived from the original on 2025-07-13.
- Cozzi NV, Sievert MK, Shulgin AT, Jacob P, Ruoho AE (September 1999). "Inhibition of plasma membrane monoamine transporters by β-ketoamphetamines". Eur J Pharmacol. 381 (1): 63–69. doi:10.1016/s0014-2999(99)00538-5. PMID 10528135. Archived from the original on 2025-07-13.
- Jacob P, Yu L, Shulgin AT, Benowitz NL (May 1999). "Minor tobacco alkaloids as biomarkers for tobacco use: comparison of users of cigarettes, smokeless tobacco, cigars, and pipes". Am J Public Health. 89 (5): 731–736. doi:10.2105/ajph.89.5.731. PMC 1508721. PMID 10224986.
- Shuglin AT (1999). "La legalización de ciertas drogas debería de ir acompañada de educación" [The legalization of certain drugs should be accompanied by education]. Revista Muy Interesante. 16 (2).
- Shulgin A (1999). "Los psicofármacos de diseño: presente y futuro" [Designer psychotropic drugs: present and future]. Revista Cáñamo. 25.

=== 2000s ===
- Shulgin AT (March 2000). "Human toxicology of psychedelic drugs". Abstracts of Papers of the American Chemical Society. 219: U477.
- Buffum JC, Shulgin AT (2001). "Overdose of 2.3 grams of intravenous methamphetamine: case, analysis and patient perspective". J Psychoactive Drugs. 33 (4): 409–412. doi:10.1080/02791072.2001.10399926. PMID 11824700. Archived from the original on 2025-07-13.
- Shulgin AT (2002). "More on the disregard syndrome (Letters)". The Scientist. 16 (2): 13.
- Alexander Shulgin (8 April 2004). 228. Hallucinogens and Consciousness (PDF). Towards a Science of Consciousness, April 7–11, 2004, Tucson Convention Center, Tucson, Arizona. pp. 91–92. Archived from the original on 21 February 2006.
- Shulgin, Alexander T. (1 August 2005). "Abused Substances". MIT Technology Review. pp. 80–81. Archived from the original on 7 July 2025.
- Callaway, J.C.; Grob, Charles S.; McKenna, Dennis J.; Nichols, David E.; Shulgin, Alexander; Tupper, Kenneth W. (1 July 2006). "A Demand for Clarity Regarding a Case Report on the Ingestion of 5-Methoxy-N,N-Dimethyltryptamine (5-MeO-DMT) in an Ayahuasca Preparation". Journal of Analytical Toxicology. 30 (6): 406–407. doi:10.1093/jat/30.6.406. ISSN 1945-2403. PMID 16872575. Archived from the original on 2025-07-13.
- Bruhn JG, El-Seedi HR, Stephanson N, Beck O, Shulgin AT (June 2008). "Ecstasy analogues found in cacti". J Psychoactive Drugs. 40 (2): 219–222. doi:10.1080/02791072.2008.10400635. PMID 18720674. Archived from the original on 2025-07-13.
- Cozzi NV, Shulgin AT, Daley PF, Gopalakrishnan A, Anderson LL, Feih JT, Ruoho AE (January 2008). "Psychoactive N,N dialkyltryptamines modulate serotonin transport by at least two mechanisms (536.17)". Society for Neuroscience Abstracts. Archived from the original on 2025-07-13. Conference poster.
- Cozzi NV, Gopalakrishnan A, Anderson LL, Feih JT, Shulgin AT, Daley PF, Ruoho AE (December 2009). "Dimethyltryptamine and other hallucinogenic tryptamines exhibit substrate behavior at the serotonin uptake transporter and the vesicle monoamine transporter" (PDF). J Neural Transm (Vienna). 116 (12): 1591–1599. doi:10.1007/s00702-009-0308-8. PMID 19756361.

=== 2010s ===
- Baumann MH, Ayestas MA, Partilla JS, Sink JR, Shulgin AT, Daley PF, Brandt SD, Rothman RB, Ruoho AE, Cozzi NV (April 2012). "The designer methcathinone analogs, mephedrone and methylone, are substrates for monoamine transporters in brain tissue". Neuropsychopharmacology. 37 (5): 1192–1203. doi:10.1038/npp.2011.304. PMC 3306880. PMID 22169943. Archived from the original on 2025-07-13.

== Theses ==
- Alexander Theodore Shulgin (June 1955). The Synthesis of Several Isotopically Labelled Amino Acids (Thesis). University of California, Berkeley.

== Other publications ==
- Alexander Shulgin (1983). Drugs of Perception / Why I Do What I Do. Psychedelics and Spirituality Conference (Psychedelic Conference II), UC Santa Barbara, May 13–14, 1983: Entheogens: The Spiritual Psychedelics. Santa Barbara, California. Archived from the original on 13 September 2025.
- Alexander T. Shulgin (29 August 1984), [Letter to the DEA re: scheduling of MDMA] (PDF)
- Alexander T. Shulgin (1 July 1988), An Annotated Bibliography of the Scientific Literature Referring to MDMA (including a sampling of the popular literature), archived from the original on 2025-07-13
- Shulgin AT (1994). Drogenpolitik: zur schleichenden Entmündigung des Bürgers [Drug Policy: The Gradual Disempowerment of Citizens]. Der Grüne Zweig (in German). Vol. 160. Löhrbach: Pieper's Medienexperimente Nachtschatten-Verl - Solothurn. ISBN 9783925817601. OCLC 75454019. Archived from the original on 7 July 2025. Alt URL
- Shulgin AT (June 2004). Investigating Consciousness. International Conference Exploring Consciousness: With What Intent?. Bath Spa University, United Kingdom.
- Shulgin AT, Shulgin A (August 2004). "5-MeO-DALT". Entry from a Forthcoming Book. Archived from the original on 7 July 2025.
- Shulgin AT, Shulgin A (2004). "DALT". Entry from a Forthcoming Book.
- Alexander Shulgin. "Ask Dr. Shulgin Online". Center for Cognitive Liberty & Ethics.
- Alexander Shulgin, Shulgin Notebooks and Lab Books, Erowid

== Publications only by Ann Shulgin ==
=== Book chapters ===
- Shulgin A (1995). "The New Psychotherapy: MDMA and the Shadow". Eleusis. 3: 3–11. Archived from the original on 20 June 2024.
- Ann Shulgin (1997). "Tribute to Jacob" (PDF). In Myron J. Stolaroff (ed.). The Secret Chief: Conversations With a Pioneer of the Underground Psychedelic Therapy Movement (PDF). Charlotte, North Carolina: Multidisciplinary Association for Psychedelic Studies. ISBN 0-9660019-1-5.
- Ann Shulgin (2001). "The New Psychotherapy: MDMA and the Shadow". In Roberts TB (ed.). Psychoactive Sacramentals: Essays on Entheogens and Religion. Council on Spiritual Practices. pp. 197–204. ISBN 978-1-889725-02-4. Archived from the original on 7 July 2025.
- Ann Shulgin (2019). "Foreword". In Crowley M (ed.). Secret Drugs of Buddhism: Psychedelic Sacraments and the Origins of the Vajrayana. Synergetic Press. ISBN 978-0-907791-74-4. OCLC 1467490010.

== Interviews ==
- Unknown, US Chemical + Biological Testing Programme 2/2: Doctors: Dr Alexander Shulgin: LSD Expert (PDF), Unknown, pp. 22–97
- Howard Rheingold (December 1978). "Future Highs". Playboy. pp. 150–151, 256, 294, 297. Archived from the original on 13 July 2025. Alternative archived copy.
- Shulgin AT (1987). "The "Social-Chemistry" of Pharmacological Discovery: Interview with Dr. Alexander T. Shulgin. January 26, 1986". Social Pharmacology. 1 (3): 279–290. Archived from the original on 2025-07-12.
- David Jay Brown (1995). "Chemophilia (with Alexander and Ann Shulgin)". Voices from the Edge: Conversations with Jerry Garcia, Ram Dass, Annie Sprinkle, Matthew Fox, Jaron Lanier, & others. Freedom, California: The Crossing Press. pp. 124–146. ISBN 9780895947321. OCLC 32625543. Alt URL
- Dennis Romero (5 September 1995). "Sasha Shulgin, Psychedelic Chemist". Los Angeles Times.
- Davidson, Ros (3 June 2014) [1997]. "Archive, 1997: Interview with Alexander Shulgin, 'godfather of ecstasy'". The Guardian.
- Dee (1998), 21st Century Highs: The Future of Psychedelics: An interview with Alexander T. "Sasha" Shulgin by Dee, Fringecore
- Scotto (1999). "An Interview with Alexander Shulgin". The Resonance Project. 4 (16). Resonant Media: 51–54. Archived from the original on 8 July 2025.
- Holland, Julie (2001). "The Godparents of MDMA: An Interview with Ann and Sasha Shulgin" ( (PDF)). Ecstasy: The Complete Guide: A Comprehensive Look at the Risks and Benefits of MDMA. Inner Traditions / Bear & Co. pp. 58–65. ISBN 978-0-89281-857-0. Archived from the original on 7 July 2025.
- Sarah de Haro (30 July 2001). "A Visit with Ann and Sasha Shulgin". Libération.
- Jon Hanna; Sylvia Thyssen (2002). "Talking with Ann and Sasha Shulgin on the Existence of God and the Pleasures of Sex and Drugs" (PDF). MAPS Newsletter. 7 (1): 3–6.
- Halem, Dann (March 2002). "Altered Statesman: Ecstasy Pioneer Alexander Shulgin Defends His Work; Making Mind-Bending Drugs Right Here in Contra Costa". Time Out.
- Platoni, Kara (1 May 2002). "2C-T-7's Bad Trip". East Bay Express (EBX).
- Ethan Brown (September 2002). "Professor X". Wired. Vol. 10, no. 9. Archived from the original on 2011-09-13.
- Graham Phillips, Paul Grocott (25 September 2003). "Shulgin (Ecstasy)". Catalyst. Australian Broadcasting Corporation. Archived from the original on 27 September 2003.
- Mark Boal, "The Agony & Ecstasy of Alexander Shulgin," Playboy, Vol. 51, no.3, March 2004, pp. 80–84, 88, 156–162.
- Drake Bennett (30 January 2005). "Dr. Ecstasy". The New York Times.
- Bienenstock, David (18 June 2021) [May 2005]. "High Times Greats: Interview with Sasha Shulgin". High Times.
- Glaister, Dan (17 June 2005). "Interview: Alexander Shulgin, creator of MDMA / The ecstasy man". The Guardian.
- Sarah Hufford (2007). "An Interview with Ann Shulgin on Psychedelics and Self-Discovery" (PDF). MAPS Newsletter. 17 (2). Multidisciplinary Association for Psychedelic Studies: 23–24.
- "Ann & Sasha Shulgin Speak... In Discussion with Earth and Fire Erowid [Adapted from an interview recorded at Mind States Costa Rica, June 15, 2007]" (PDF). The Entheogen Review. 17 (2): 41–47, 79–86. 2008.
- Rucker, Victor C.; Ackerman, Lily J. (2009). "Interviewing Scientists: Alexander Shulgin as a Case Study". Science & Education. 18 (1): 67–71. Bibcode:2009Sc&Ed..18...67R. doi:10.1007/s11191-007-9096-4. ISSN 0926-7220.
- Étienne Sauret (director), Alexander Shulgin (subject), Ann Shulgin (subject) (13 March 2010). Dirty Pictures (Motion picture). Turn of the Century Pictures. OCLC 945760567. Archived from the original on 6 March 2016.
- Hamilton Morris (May 2010). "The Last Interview With Alexander Shulgin... Which, Technically, Was Not an Interview at All". VICE. 17 (5): 34–39.
- Michael Martin (20 August 2010). "Love and Other Drugs". Interview Magazine.
- Hamilton Morris (22 December 2010). "SiHKAL: Shulgins I Have Known and Loved: The Man Who Birthed Ecstasy in a Test-Tube". Hamilton's Pharmacopeia [web series]. Episode S0E4. Vice Media. [Web article].
- Surfing the Rave: Ecstacy. Interview with Dr. Alexander Shulgin, archived from the original on 13 July 2025

== Obituaries ==
- Hamilton Morris (2014). "Alexander Shulgin (1925–2014)". The Fabulist. No. 5.

== See also ==
- Alexander Shulgin
- Bibliography of Albert Hofmann
- Bibliography of Hamilton Morris
