= Mexacarbate =

Names
- Preferred IUPAC name 4-(Dimethylamino)-3,5-dimethylphenyl methylcarbamate
- Other names Mexacarbate, Zectran; 4-Dimethylamino-3,5-xylyl methylcarbamate

Identifiers
CAS Number	315-18-4
3D model (JSmol)	Interactive image
ChEBI	CHEBI:82092
ChEMBL	ChEMBL454804
ChemSpider	9043
ECHA InfoCard	100.005.683
EC Number	206-249-3
KEGG	C18952
PubChem CID	9414
UNII	ZTM4IPV8G8
UN number	2757 (MEXACARBATE)
CompTox Dashboard (EPA)	DTXSID7020893
- InChI: InChI=1S/C12H18N2O2/c1-8-6-10(16-12(15)13-3)7-9(2)11(8)14(4)5/h6-7H,1-5H3,(H,13,15) Key: YNEVBPNZHBAYOA-UHFFFAOYSA-N
- SMILES: CC1=CC(=CC(=C1N(C)C)C)OC(=O)NC

Properties
Chemical formula	C_{12}H_{18}N_{2}O_{2}
Molar mass	222.288 g·mol^{−1}
Appearance	White, crystalline solid
Density	1.077 g/cm^{3}
Melting point	85 °C (185 °F; 358 K)
Boiling point	318 °C (604 °F; 591 K)

Hazards
- GHS labelling
Pictograms	(GHS06: Toxic) (GHS09: Environmental hazard)
Signal word	Danger
Hazard statements	H300, H312, H410
Precautionary statements	P264, P270, P273, P280, P301+P316, P302+P352, P317, P321, P330, P362+P364, P391, P405, P501
Flash point	146 °C (295 °F; 419 K)
- Except where otherwise noted, data are given for materials in their standard state (at 25 °C [77 °F], 100 kPa). Infobox references

Mexacarbate is a carbamate pesticide developed by Alexander Shulgin and marketed in 1961 by Dow Chemical Company under the trade name Zectran. As of 2009, Mexacarbate is considered obsolete or discontinued, according to the World Health Organization. It is notable for being the first biodegradable pesticide.

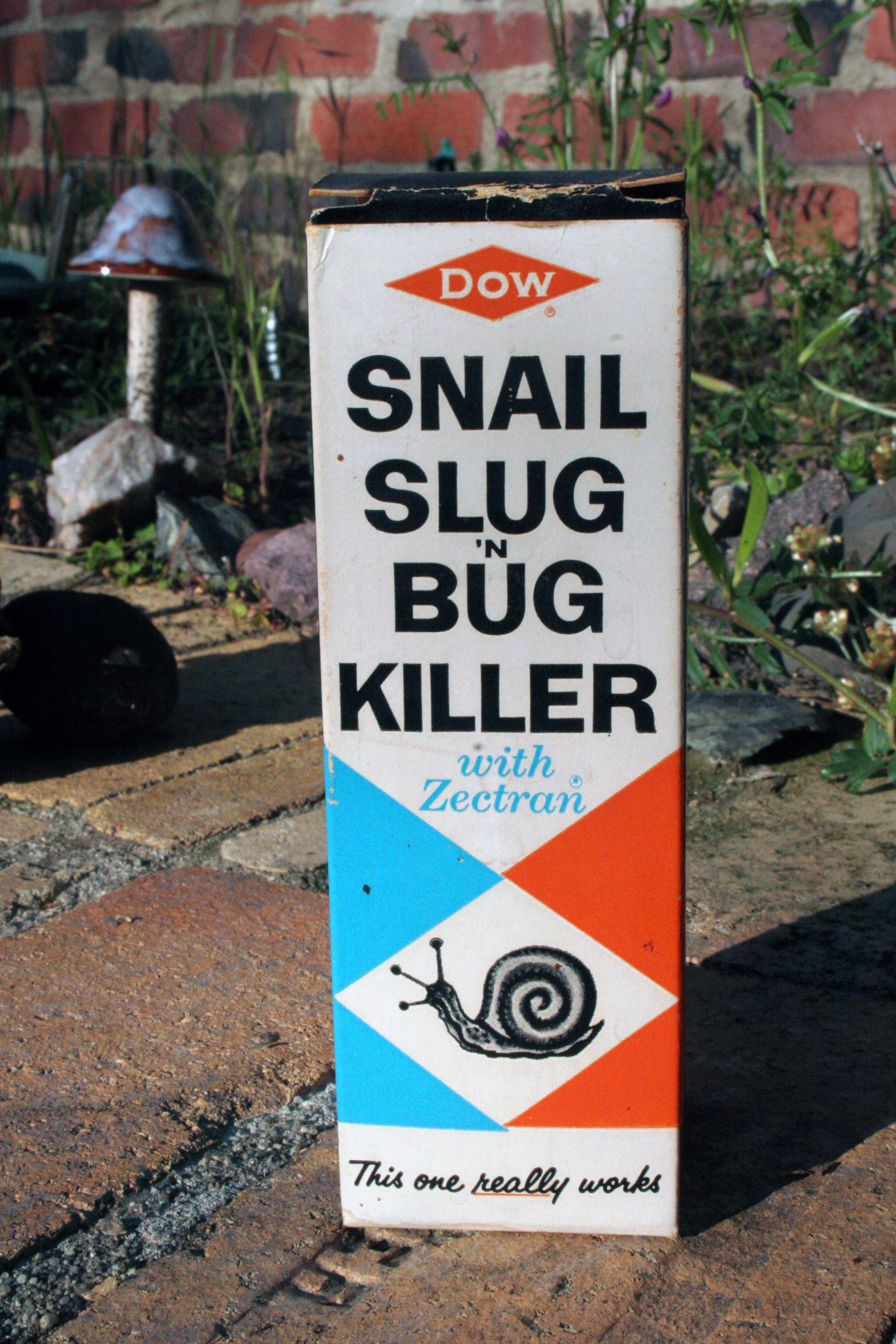
Zectran-containing pesticide manufactured by Dow.

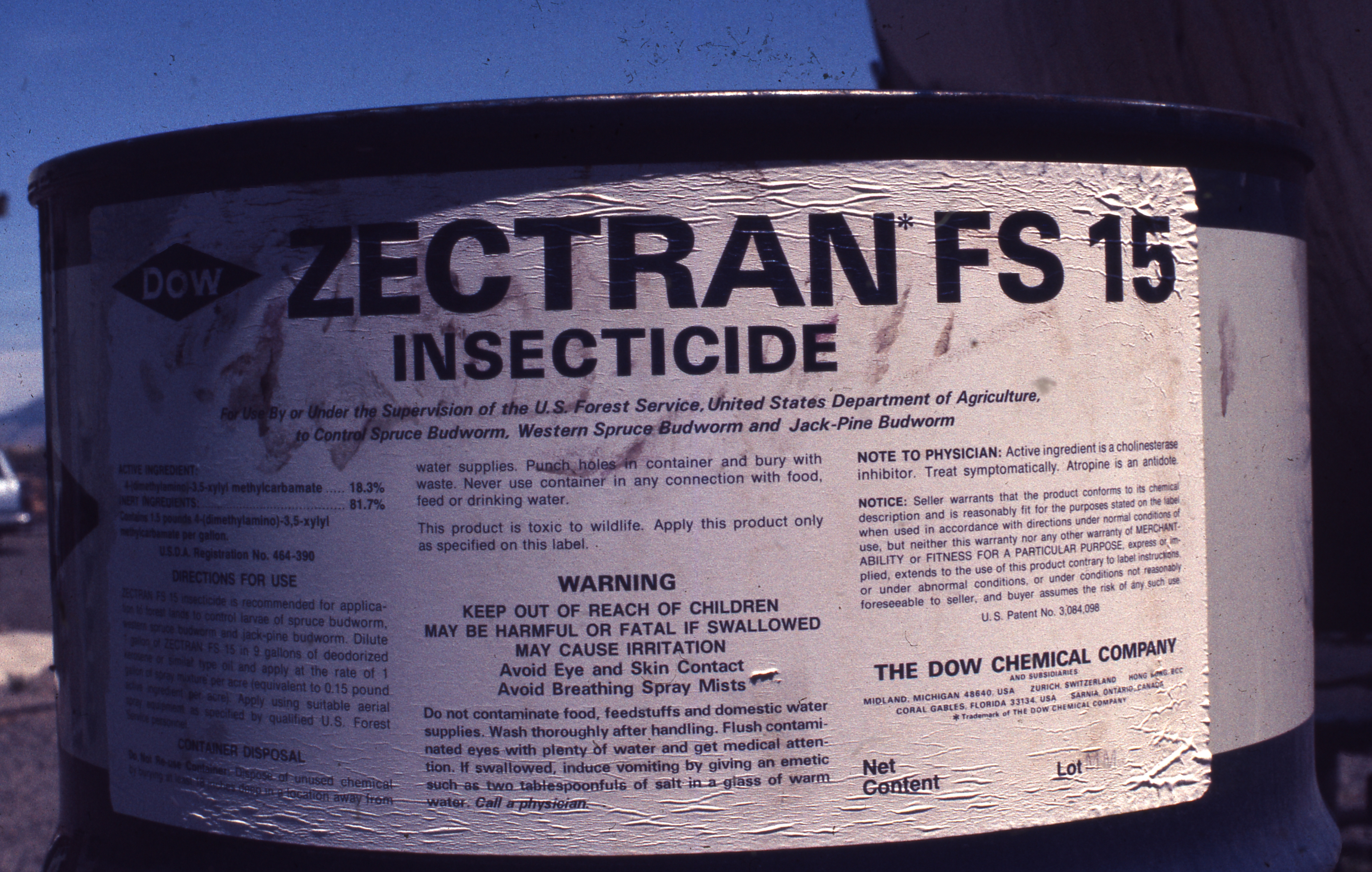
Canister of mexacarbate (Zectran).

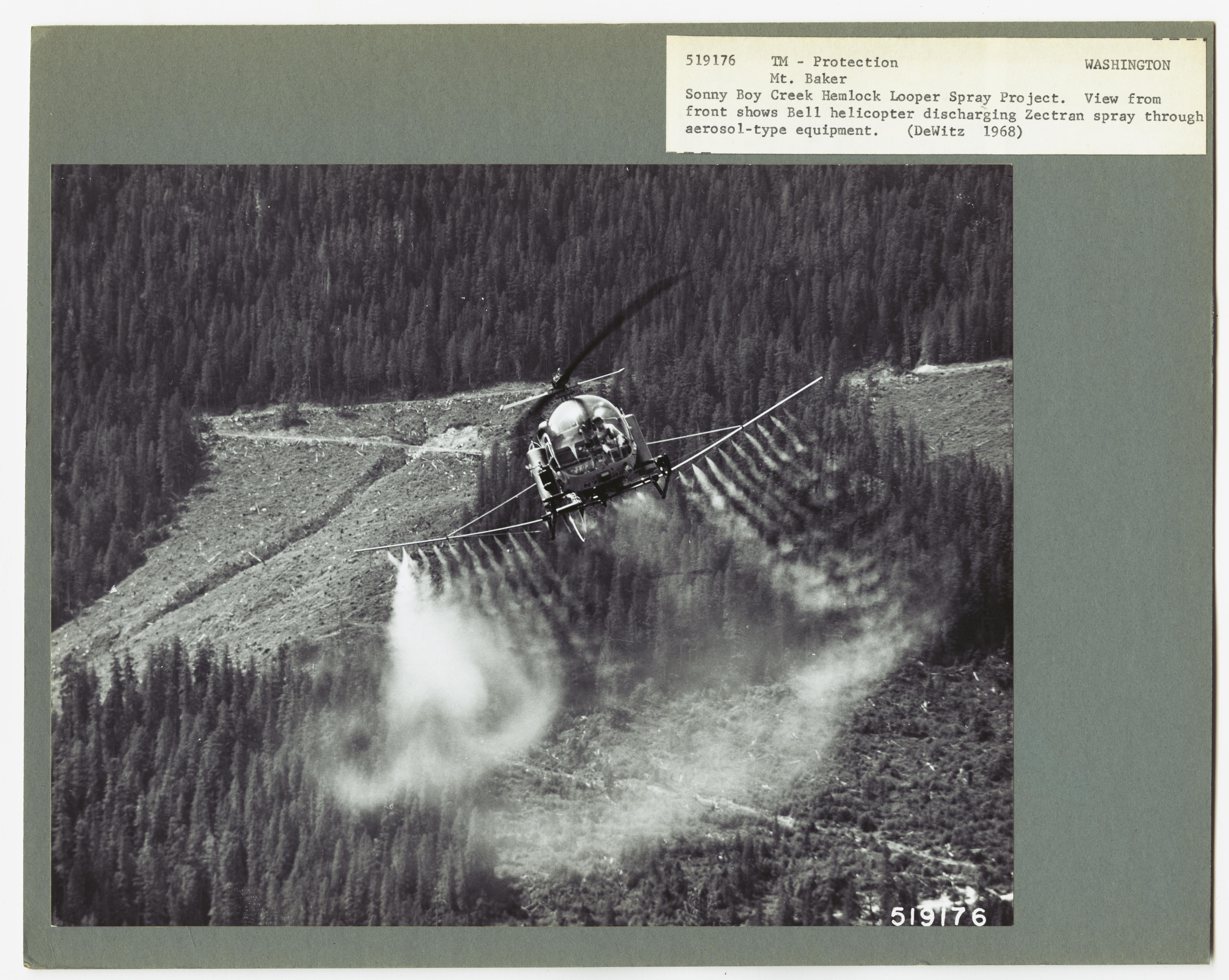
Mexacarbate being sprayed by helicopter.
