= The Simple Plant Isoquinolines =

Book about isoquinoline alkaloids

- Author: Alexander T. Shulgin, Wendy E. Perry
- Language: English
- Subject: Isoquinoline and tetrahydroisoquinoline alkaloids
- Publisher: Transform Press
- Publication date: 2002
- Publication place: United States
- Pages: 624 pages
- ISBN: 9780963009623
- OCLC: 51006569
- Website: https://transformpress.com/publications/

The Simple Plant Isoquinolines is a 2002 book written by Alexander Shulgin and Wendy Perry about isoquinoline and tetrahydroisoquinoline alkaloids, for instance the various cyclized phenethylamine mescaline analogues found in many cactus species. It was published by Transform Press.

== See also ==
- Bibliography of Alexander Shulgin
- The Shulgin Index, Volume One: Psychedelic Phenethylamines and Related Compounds (2011)
- PiHKAL (1991) and TiHKAL (1997)
- Substituted tetrahydroisoquinoline
- Peyote § Constituents
- Pachycereus pringlei § Constituents and effects
- Keeper Trout
