= The Entheogen Review =

- Cover of the first issue of The Entheogen Review (Autumnal Equinox 1992).
- Discipline: Entheogens
- Language: English
- Edited by: Jim DeKorne, David Aardvark, Keeper Trout, E. V. Love

Publication details
- History: 1992–2008 (16 years)
- Frequency: Quarterly
- ISO 4: Find out here

Indexing
- ISSN: 1066-1913
- OCLC no.: 26889588

Links
- Journal homepage

The Entheogen Review (TER), or the The Journal of Unauthorized Research on Visionary Plants and Drugs, was a quarterly magazine on entheogens like psychedelics that ran from 1992 to 2008. The periodical includes historically important trip reports of entheogens.

== See also ==
- List of psychedelic journals
- List of psychedelic literature
- Keeper Trout
