= Alexander Shulgin Research Institute =

- Industry: Pharmaceutical; Psychedelic medicine
- Founded: 2021; 5 years ago
- Founder: Ann Shulgin; Paul F. Daley; Nicholas V. Cozzi
- Website: shulginresearch.net

Alexander Shulgin Research Institute (ASRI) is an organization developing novel psychedelic and entactogen drugs as potential pharmaceuticals, among other activities. Its goal is to advance the scientific work and legacy of psychedelic chemist Alexander "Sasha" Shulgin and to complete his unfinished projects.

The ASRI was informally established by Alexander Shulgin in the 1980s. However, discussions to formally establish the institute began shortly after Shulgin's passing in 2014. The organization was formally incorporated on April 19th, 2021, Bicycle Day, by Ann Shulgin, the late widow of Alexander Shulgin, and by psychedelic chemists and longtime Shulgin research colleagues Paul F. Daley and Nicholas V. Cozzi. Cozzi was the organization's first president between 2020 and 2025. He was succeeded by Daley in March 2025. As of April 2025, ASRI has filed and/or been granted several patents covering various entactogenic and psychedelic compounds. Shulgin himself was not averse to intellectual property (IP) protection and held patents for drugs such as DOM, DOET, Ariadne, and methylone.

Pharmaceutical candidates under development at ASRI include ASR-3001 (5-MeO-iPALT; a "second-generation, fast-acting tryptamine" said to produce an internal psychedelic state without sensory or visual disturbances) and ASR-2001 (2CB-5PrO; a phenethylamine-based non-hallucinogenic serotonin 5-HT_{2A} receptor agonist). XOB (ASR-6001), a drug invented by Cozzi, is a dual-action serotonin 5-HT_{2A} receptor antagonist and voltage-gated sodium channel blocker. The company has developed deuterated isotopologues of 2C-B including 2CB-2OCD_{3} (2-trideuteromethoxy-2C-B) and 2CB-5OCD_{3} (5-trideuteromethoxy-2C-B), which appear to show similar in-vitro pharmacology as 2C-B. ASRI has more than 500 compounds in its collection, many of which were originally developed by Shulgin.

A related initiative is the Alexander Shulgin Archiving Project (or The Shulgin Archive), which is a co-project with Erowid that began by 2007. An earlier group preceding the ASRI was "Team Shulgin", which was formed by 2010 and comprised Alexander and Ann Shulgin, Ann Shulgin's daughter Wendy Tucker (the editor of PiHKAL and TiHKAL and the head of Transform Press), Paul Daley, Tania Manning, and Greg Manning.

== Selected publications ==
- Daley, Paul (September 2023). Alexander Shulgin Research Institute (ASRI). Psychedelic Molecules, 4th–5th September 2023, Prague, Czech Republic. Zenodo. doi:10.5281/ZENODO.17553584.
- Denomme N, Hernandez CC, Bock HA, Ohana RF, Bakshi S, Sherwood AM, McCorvy JD, Daley PF, Callaway WB, Hull JM, Alt A, Isom LL, Cozzi NV (July 2024). "N-(4-Bromo-2,5-Dimethoxyphenethyl)-6-(4-Phenylbutoxy)Hexan-1-Amine (XOB): A Novel Phenylalkylamine Antagonist of Serotonin 2A Receptors and Voltage-Gated Sodium Channels" (PDF). Mol Pharmacol. 106 (2): 92–106. doi:10.1124/molpharm.123.000837. PMID 38821630.
- Trout K, Daley PF (December 2024). "The origin of 2,5-dimethoxy-4-methylamphetamine (DOM, STP)" (PDF). Drug Test Anal. 16 (12): 1496–1508. doi:10.1002/dta.3667. PMID 38419183.
- Cozzi NV (June 2026). "Serotonin 2A receptor binding, functional activity, and in vitro metabolism of two trideuteromethoxy 2C-B isotopologues". Naunyn Schmiedebergs Arch Pharmacol. doi:10.1007/s00210-026-05566-5. PMID 42313138.

== See also ==
- List of psychedelic pharmaceutical companies
- List of investigational hallucinogens and entactogens
- Transform Press
- The Shulgin Index, Volume One: Psychedelic Phenethylamines and Related Compounds (Shulgin, Manning, & Daley, 2011)
- Keeper Trout
- Mindstate Design Labs
