= XOB =

Clinical data
- Other names: ASR-6001; ASR6001; N-[(4-Phenylbutoxy)hexyl]-4-bromo-2,5-dimethoxyphenethylamine
- Drug class: Serotonin 5-HT_{2A} receptor antagonist; Voltage-gated sodium channel blocker
- ATC code: None

Identifiers
- IUPAC name: N-[2-(4-bromo-2,5-dimethoxyphenyl)ethyl]-6-(4-phenylbutoxy)hexan-1-amine
- PubChem CID: 170703346

Chemical and physical data
- Formula: C_{26}H_{38}BrNO_{3}
- Molar mass: 492.498 g·mol^{−1}
- 3D model (JSmol): Interactive image
- SMILES: COC1=CC(=C(C=C1CCNCCCCCCOCCCCC2=CC=CC=C2)OC)Br
- InChI: InChI=1S/C26H38BrNO3/c1-29-25-21-24(27)26(30-2)20-23(25)15-17-28-16-9-3-4-10-18-31-19-11-8-14-22-12-6-5-7-13-22/h5-7,12-13,20-21,28H,3-4,8-11,14-19H2,1-2H3; Key:GOUKDEUQBCARRO-UHFFFAOYSA-N

XOB, also known as ASR-6001 or as N-[(4-phenylbutoxy)hexyl]-4-bromo-2,5-dimethoxyphenethylamine, is a serotonin 5-HT_{2A} receptor antagonist and voltage-gated sodium channel (VGSC) blocker of the phenethylamine and 2C families. It is a derivative of 2C-B in which the amine-containing side chain has been extended with the same long group found in salmeterol.

The drug is of relatively low potency as a serotonin 5-HT_{2A} receptor antagonist. It shows modest selectivity for the serotonin 5-HT_{2A} receptor over the serotonin 5-HT_{2B} and 5-HT_{2C} receptors. XOB was accidentally found to have local anesthetic properties upon contact with human skin, which led to the elucidation of its sodium channel-blocking activity.

XOB was developed in part by researchers at the Alexander Shulgin Research Institute (ASRI).

== See also ==
- Substituted methoxyphenethylamine
- 2C (psychedelics)
- Serotonin 5-HT_{2A} receptor antagonist
- Evenamide
