= Transform Press =

- Industry: Book publishing
- Founded: 1991
- Founder: Alexander Shulgin; Ann Shulgin
- Headquarters: Lafayette or Berkeley, California, United States
- Key people: Alexander Shulgin; Ann Shulgin; Wendy Tucker
- Products: PiHKAL, TiHKAL, The Shulgin Index, The Simple Plant Isoquinolines, The Nature of Drugs, Ergot Alkaloids: History, Chemistry, and Therapeutic Uses
- Owner: Wendy Tucker
- Website: transformpress.com

Transform Press is a small publishing company in the area of psychedelics and other psychoactive drugs that is based in Berkeley, California. It is the publisher of the books of Alexander Shulgin and Ann Shulgin and is led by Wendy Tucker, Ann Shulgin's daughter.

The company's published books by the Shulgins include PiHKAL (Phenethylamines I Have Known and Loved) (1991), TiHKAL (Tryptamines I Have Known and Loved) (1997), The Shulgin Index (2011), The Simple Plant Isoquinolines (2002), and The Nature of Drugs (2021). They have also published Ergot Alkaloids: History, Chemistry, and Therapeutic Uses (2023), an English translation by Jitka Nykodemová of Albert Hofmann's 1964 book Die Mutterkornalkaloide: Vom Mutterkorn zum LSD (The Ergot Alkaloids: From Ergot to LSD).

According to Nick Cozzi of the Alexander Shulgin Research Institute (ASRI) in mid-2023, the group is in the process of translating Daniel Trachsel's book Phenethylamine: von der Struktur zur Funktion (Phenethylamines: From Structure to Function) into English, with tentative publication by Transform Press.

== See also ==
- Bibliography of Alexander Shulgin
- List of psychedelic literature
- Alexander Shulgin Research Institute (ASRI)
