= Alexander Shulgin =

American chemist and recreational drug explorer (1925–2014)

Alexander Shulgin PhD
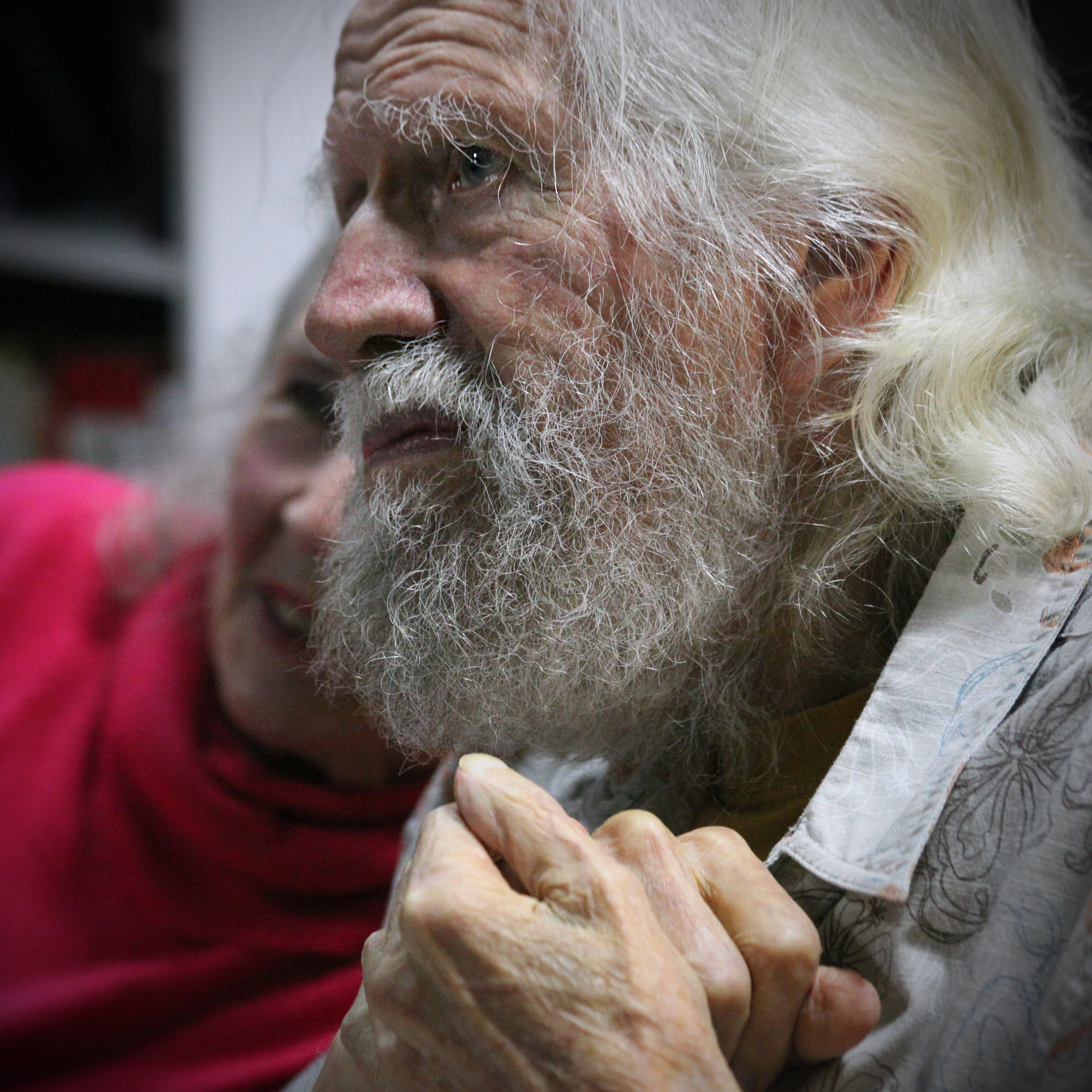
- Shulgin with his wife Ann in 2011
- Born: Alexander Theodore Shulgin; June 17, 1925; Berkeley, California, U.S.
- Died: June 2, 2014 (aged 88); Lafayette, California, U.S.
- Other name: Alexander "Sasha" Shulgin
- Education: Harvard University, University of California, Berkeley (PhD)
- Known for: Work in psychedelic chemistry on phenethylamines and tryptamines, including MDMA, 2C-B, DOM, and others
- Notable work: PiHKAL: A Chemical Love Story (1991); TiHKAL: The Continuation (1997); The Shulgin Index, Volume One (2011); Others
- Spouses: Nina Gordon (deceased); Ann Gotlieb (deceased)
- Children: Theodore "Ted" Shulgin
- Awards: Several DEA awards
- Scientific career
- Fields: Chemistry, biochemistry
- Workplaces: Bio-Rad Laboratories, Dow Chemical Company, University of California, Berkeley, University of California, San Francisco, San Francisco State University, San Francisco General Hospital, others
- Thesis: The Synthesis of Several Isotopically Labelled Amino Acids (1955)
- Doctoral advisor: David M. Greenberg
- Website: Ask Dr. Shulgin Online

Alexander Theodore "Sasha" Shulgin (June 17, 1925 – June 2, 2014) was an American biochemist who synthesized and tested over 200 psychedelic and related chemical compounds. Among the most notable psychedelic and related drugs that Shulgin developed include 2C-B, DOM (STP), and Ariadne (4C-D; BL-3912; Dimoxamine). In addition, he is known for discovering and describing the unique effects of the entactogen MDMA (ecstasy), which led to its use in MDMA-assisted psychotherapy and to its widespread use as a recreational drug, for instance in the rave scene.

Shulgin studied chemistry at Harvard University and the University of California, Berkeley and received his Ph.D. in biochemistry in 1955. He developed the best-selling biodegradable pesticide mexacarbate (Zectran) while working at Dow Chemical Company in the early 1960s. Shulgin became interested in psychedelic chemistry after having his first psychedelic experience in 1960 and from then on began developing new psychedelic compounds in his lab at his home in Lafayette, California. His approach was to synthesize the compounds, test them on himself and a small group of trusted others, and document his findings. He formally published on psychedelics in the scientific literature for decades, before publishing his books PiHKAL: A Chemical Love Story (Phenethylamines I Have Known and Loved) in 1991 and TiHKAL: The Continuation (Tryptamines I Have Known and Loved) in 1997. These books documented his and others' work with hundreds of phenethylamines, tryptamines, and lysergamides, including their chemical syntheses, properties and effects, and discussion. They were coauthored by Shulgin and by his wife Ann Shulgin, a pioneering psychedelic therapist, whom he met in 1978 and married in 1981. Shulgin was an academic and taught at universities such as the University of California, Berkeley, the University of California, San Francisco, and San Francisco State University.

Shulgin had a close and friendly relationship with the Drug Enforcement Administration (DEA) for many decades and held a DEA license to work with Schedule I controlled substances. Following the publication of PiHKAL however, Shulgin's lab was raided by the DEA in 1993. He was stripped of his license and fined due to a violation of its terms. According to a DEA representative, "It is our opinion that those books are pretty much cookbooks on how to make illegal drugs." There have also been overdoses and deaths due to compounds that Shulgin developed, which he has expressed frustration and sadness about, but also emphasized personal freedom and that all drugs have risks. During his life, Shulgin advocated for use of psychedelics and for legalization of all drugs. He has historically been a polarizing figure, seen variously as a "hero of the counterculture", a "curiosity", and a "menace".

Shulgin has been described as the "greatest psychedelic chemist of all time". He has also been dubbed the "godfather of ecstasy" and as the "godfather of psychedelics". Several documentaries have been made about Shulgin and his work and life. Transform Press, the publisher of PiHKAL and TiHKAL, and the Alexander Shulgin Research Institute (ASRI) were founded by Shulgin and/or by his family and close colleagues. In addition, Shulgin's home and lab, known as the Shulgin Farm, have been memorialized as a center for psychedelic education and community. Shulgin died in 2014 at the age of 88 and was followed by his wife Ann Shulgin in 2022. As of the 2020s, many psychedelics and entactogens, including some associated with Shulgin like MDMA, are under investigation for potential medical use to treat mental health conditions.

== Early life and education ==
Shulgin was born on June 17, 1925, in Berkeley, California, to Theodore Stevens Shulgin (1893–1978) and Henrietta D. (Aten) Shulgin (1894–1960). His father was born in Chelyabinsk, Russia and was a refugee of the Russian Revolution; his mother was born in Illinois. Theodore and Henrietta were public school teachers in Alameda County, California.

Shulgin studied organic chemistry at Harvard University as a scholarship student, and was enrolled there at the age of 16. He dropped out to join the U.S. Navy, during his second year at Harvard. In 1944, a military nurse gave Shulgin a glass of orange juice prior to a surgery for a thumb infection, while serving on USS Pope during World War II; he drank the juice and, assuming that crystals at the bottom of the glass were a sedative, "fell unconscious". Upon waking he learned that the crystals were undissolved sugar, and that doctors had administered anesthesia after he was already unconscious—an experience Drake Bennett of The New York Times Magazine referred to as "revelatory", and a "tantalizing hint of the mind's odd strength", as "his collapse was caused entirely by the placebo effect".

After serving in the armed forces, Shulgin returned to California, and earned his PhD in biochemistry from the University of California, Berkeley. Through the late 1950s, Shulgin completed post-doctoral work in the fields of psychiatry and pharmacology at University of California, San Francisco.

== Career ==
After working at Bio-Rad Laboratories as a research director for a brief period, Shulgin began his career at Dow Chemical Company.

Shulgin first heard of mescaline in the mid-1940s and read about it over the years, including the works of early researchers like Kurt Beringer and Alexandre Rouhier and the later works of Aldous Huxley among others. A psychologist friend of Shulgin's named Terry Major offered to let him try mescaline and he eagerly accepted. Shulgin's first experience with the drug, at a dose of 350 or 400 mg of the sulfate salt, was on April 2, 1960. Speaking of the experience, Shulgin said "I learned there was a great deal inside me". In addition, he said that the experience "unquestionably confirmed the entire direction of my life". Shulgin described experiencing color and visual changes, insights, recall of childhood memories, and experiencing the world as amazing like when he was a child again. He later reported personal revelations that "had been brought about by a fraction of a gram of a white solid, but that in no way whatsoever could it be argued that these memories had been contained within the white solid ... I understood that our entire universe is contained in the mind and the spirit. We may choose not to find access to it, we may even deny its existence, but it is indeed there inside us, and there are chemicals that can catalyze its availability." With the experience, Shulgin decided to study psychedelic drugs and their chemistry and began publishing in this area in early 1961.

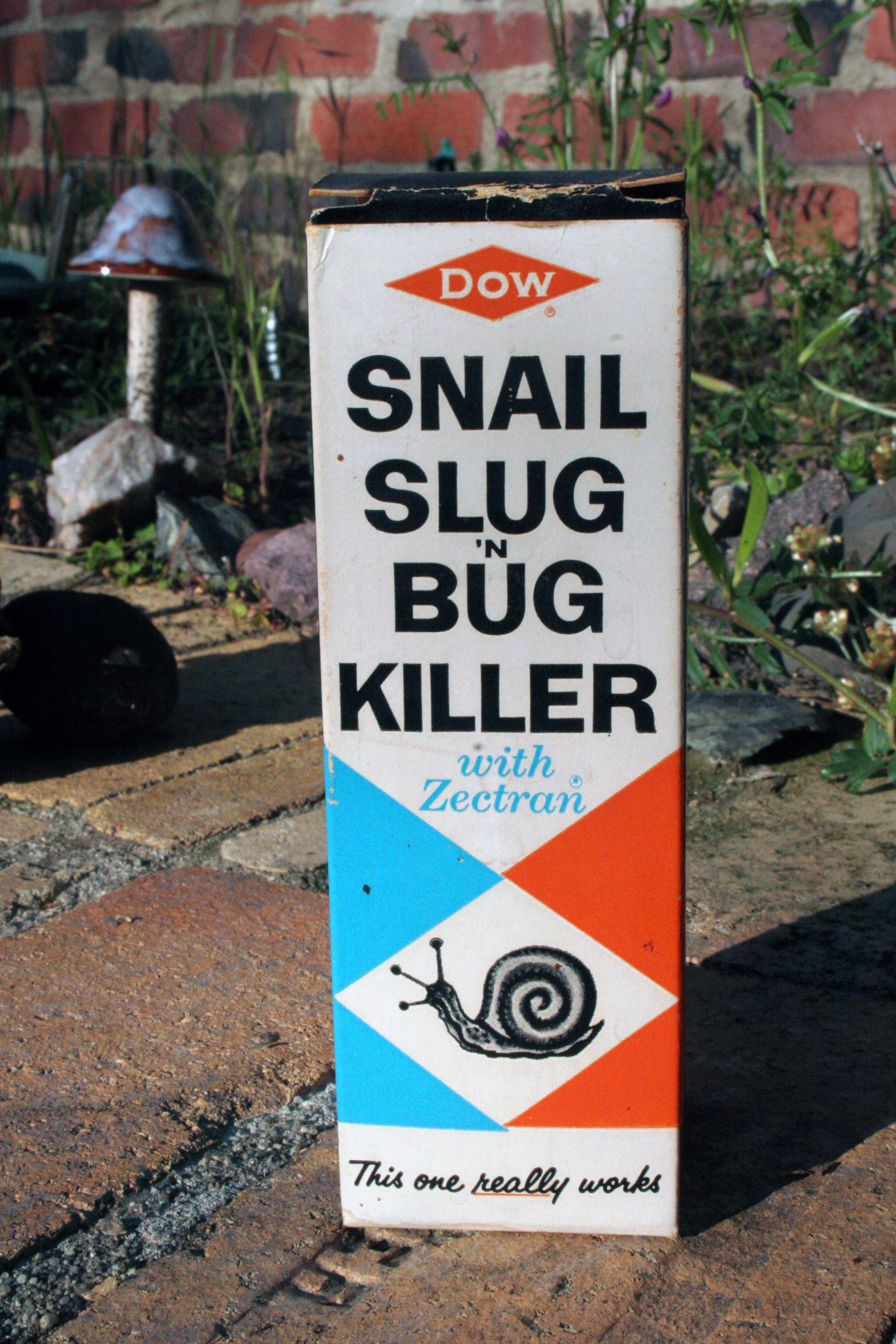
Mexacarbate (Zectran)-containing pesticide manufactured by Dow; photo taken at the Farm in 2009.

Shulgin's professional activities continued to lean in the direction of psychopharmacology, furthered by his personal experiences with psychedelics. But during this period he was unable to do much independent research. His opportunity for further research came in 1961 after his development of mexacarbate (brand name Zectran), the first biodegradable pesticide and a highly profitable product. In his book PiHKAL: A Chemical Love Story, Shulgin limits his pesticide days at Dow Chemical to one sentence of the almost 1,000 pages. Dow Chemical Company, in return for mexacarbate's valuable patent, gave Shulgin great freedom. During this time, he created and patented drugs when Dow asked, and published findings on other drugs in journals such as Nature and the Journal of Organic Chemistry.

Shulgin discovered the psychedelic drug DOM, which has around 100 times the potency of mescaline, while working at Dow Chemical Company in 1963. This led to a research program on DOM and its analogue DOET at the company in the mid-1960s, including clinical studies of DOET for potential medical use at sub-hallucinogenic doses as a "psychic energizer". They tasked neuroscientist Solomon H. Snyder at Johns Hopkins University with conducting the studies. Soon after LSD was banned in California in October 1966, LSD chemist Owsley Stanley began looking for a legal replacement for it. Shulgin provided Stanley with information about DOM's synthesis on index cards and a 50 g sample of the drug. Stanley then began distributing DOM to the public in very-high-dose tablets under the nickname STP in the Haight-Ashbury district of San Francisco starting in April 1967. This resulted in a small public health crisis due to unintentional overdoses, the drug's potential for very long durations, and its greater adverse effects compared to LSD. It was soon uncovered and published in the news media that DOM had originated at Dow Chemical Company. As a result, the company cancelled its research program into DOET. In addition, at some point, Dow Chemical Company requested that Shulgin no longer use their name as an affiliation on his publications.

In December 1966, shortly before the DOM epidemic, Shulgin left Dow Chemical company in order to pursue his own interests. He first spent two years in medical school studying neurology at the University of California, San Francisco, School of Medicine, leaving to work on a consulting project. Shulgin set up a home-based lab on his property, known as "the Farm" (later called the Shulgin Farm), and became a private consultant. He also taught classes at local universities including the University of California, Berkeley, the University of California, San Francisco, and San Francisco State University. Through his friend Bob Sager, head of the U.S. Drug Enforcement Administration (DEA)'s Western Laboratories, Shulgin formed a relationship with the DEA and began holding pharmacology seminars for the agents, supplying the DEA with samples of various compounds, and occasionally serving as an expert witness in court. In 1988, he authored a then-definitive law enforcement reference book on controlled substances called The Controlled Substances Act: A Resource Manual of the Current Status of the Federal Drug Laws. He also served as an expert witness for the DEA and received several awards from them.

Shulgin developed Ariadne (4C-D; BL-3912), a non-hallucinogenic analogue of DOM, in 1968. Though Ariadne was not psychedelic, it was still psychoactive, producing feelings of well-being and mental alertness analogously to sub-hallucinogenic doses of DOM and DOET. Shulgin introduced Ariadne to Bristol-Myers Company, which started clinical trials of the drug for various uses in 1974. It reached phase 3 trials and had the tentative brand name Dimoxamine, but development was ultimately discontinued for strategic economic reasons.

== Independent research ==
In order to work with scheduled psychoactive chemicals, Shulgin obtained a DEA Schedule I license for an analytical laboratory, which allowed him to synthesize and possess any otherwise illicit drug. Shulgin set up a chemical synthesis laboratory in a small building behind his house, which gave him a great deal of career autonomy. Shulgin used this freedom to synthesize and test the effects of potentially psychoactive drugs.

In 1976, Shulgin was reintroduced to MDMA by a student in the medicinal chemistry group he advised at San Francisco State University. MDMA had been synthesized in 1912 by Merck and patented in 1913 as an intermediate of another synthesis in order to block competitors, but was never explored in its own right. Shulgin went on to develop a new synthesis method, and in 1976, introduced the chemical to Leo Zeff, a psychologist from Oakland, California. Zeff used the substance in his practice in small doses as an aid to talk therapy. Zeff introduced the substance to hundreds of psychologists and lay therapists around the nation, including Ann Gotlieb, whom Alexander Shulgin met in 1979 and married in 1981. It was her fourth marriage, and she had four children.

Most of the Shulgin research group circa 1980. From left to right, Darrell Lemaire, unknown, Myron Stolaroff, Dale, Phyllis, Alexander Shulgin, Ann Shulgin, and Peyton Jacob III.

After judicious self-experiments, Shulgin enlisted a small group of friends with whom he regularly tested his creations, starting in 1960. Among these friends included Peyton Jacob III, Myron Stolaroff, Lama Mike Crowley and Darrell Lemaire, among others. Shulgin developed a systematic way of ranking the effects of the various drugs, known as the Shulgin Rating Scale, with a vocabulary to describe the visual, auditory and physical sensations. He personally tested hundreds of drugs, mainly analogues of various phenethylamines (family containing MDMA, mescaline, 2Cs, and the DOx), and tryptamines (family containing DMT, psilocin, and LSD). There are a seemingly infinite number of slight chemical variations, which can produce variations in effect—some pleasant and some unpleasant, depending on the person, substance, and situation—all of which are meticulously recorded in Shulgin's laboratory notebooks. Shulgin published many of these objective and subjective reports in his books and papers. About 2C-B he said in 2003: "It is, in my opinion, one of the most graceful, erotic, sensual, introspective compounds I have ever invented. For most people, it is a short-lived and comfortable psychedelic, with neither toxic side-effects nor next-day hang-over."

With his wife Ann, Shulgin published the books PiHKAL: A Chemical Love Story (Phenethylamines I Have Known and Loved) in 1991 and TiHKAL: The Continuation (Tryptamines I Have Known and Loved) in 1997. These books documented his and others' work with hundreds of phenethylamines, tryptamines, and lysergamides, including their chemical syntheses, properties and effects, and discussion. The Shulgins started their own publishing company, Transform Press, to publish the books.

In 1994, two years after the publication of PiHKAL, the DEA raided his lab. The agency requested that Shulgin surrender his license for violating its terms, and he was fined $25,000 for possession of anonymous samples sent to him for quality testing. In the 15 years preceding the publication of PiHKAL, two announced and scheduled reviews failed to find any irregularities. Richard Meyer, spokesman for DEA's San Francisco Field Division, has stated that, "It is our opinion that those books are pretty much cookbooks on how to make illegal drugs. Agents tell me that in clandestine labs that they have raided, they have found copies of those books."

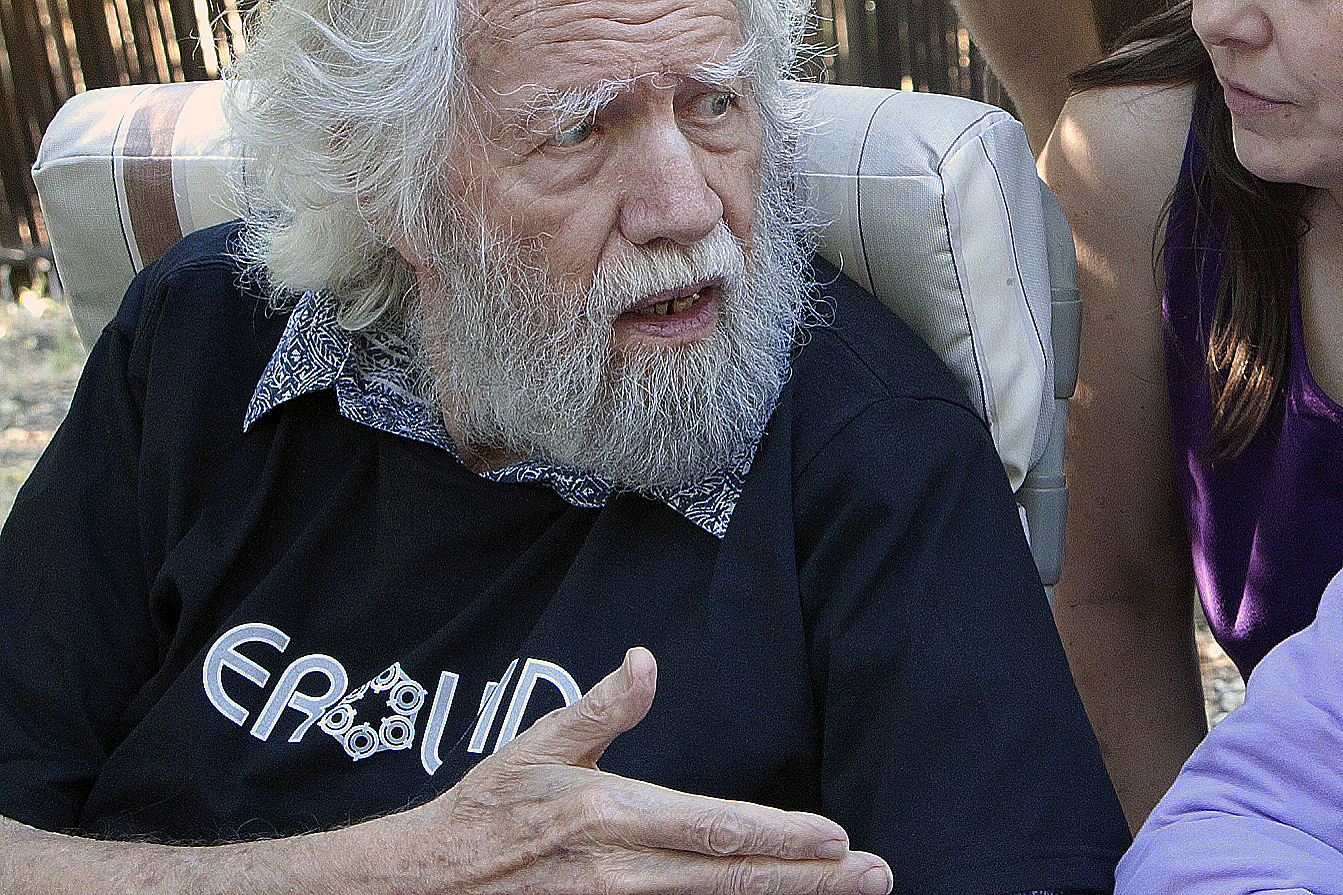
Shulgin at the home-based lab on his property, known as "the Farm", 2009. He is wearing an Erowid shirt.

In the 2000s, Shulgin had been working on a series of N-allylated tryptamines including DALT, 5-MeO-DALT, and 5-MeO-MALT. He had also been working in the 2000s to identify the active constituents of Pachycereus pringlei (cardón or elephant cactus), a psychedelic cactus native to northwestern Mexico that does not contain mescaline, though these efforts were ultimately unsuccessful. He published the book The Simple Plant Isoquinolines in 2003. Shulgin ran a web column called Ask Dr. Shulgin Online through the Center for Cognitive Liberty & Ethics (CCLE) from 2001 to 2005. His final book published during his life, The Shulgin Index, Volume One: Psychedelic Phenethylamines and Related Compounds, was published in 2011. A second volume on tryptamines was also being prepared but was ultimately never completed. His book The Nature of Drugs: History, Pharmacology, and Social Impact, based on his lectures for a pharmacology course he taught at San Francisco State University in the late 1980s, was published posthumously in two volumes in 2021 and 2023.

== Personal life, health, and death ==
Shulgin was married to Nina Shulgin (née Gordon) until her death from a stroke in 1977. He had a son with her, Theodore "Ted" Shulgin. Following Nina's death, Shulgin married Ann Shulgin (née Gotlieb) in 1981. He spent most of his later life at the Farm in Lafayette, California. Shulgin's son Ted died in 2011 at the age of 61. Ted had helped Shulgin in synthesizing DOM as a teenager in 1963.

On April 8, 2008, at the age of 82, Shulgin underwent surgery to replace a defective aortic valve. He is said to have been almost blind in 2010. On November 16, 2010, Shulgin suffered a stroke, from which he largely recovered. Also at the close of 2010, a skin-grafting surgery saved his left foot from being amputated. Around this time, Shulgin began showing early signs of dementia, mostly severe loss of short-term memory. With progression of the dementia since 2010, his wife, Ann Shulgin, had been trying to sell part of their property to raise more money to cover care costs. On April 17, 2014, Ann Shulgin reported on Facebook that her husband had developed liver cancer, and in a May 31 update on Facebook she said that, although appearing frail, he seemed to be experiencing his last moments in peace and without pain. Shulgin died at his home on June 2, 2014, at the age of 88.

Shulgin is said to have had more than 4,000 psychedelic experiences during his life. His favorite psychedelic drug is said to have been LSD, while his favorite psychedelic of his own creations was 2C-B. When asked what his favorite psychoactive drug in general was, he responded "probably a nice, moderately expensive Zinfandel" (a type of red wine). Shulgin personally disliked cannabis and ketamine, as he didn't like feeling that disoriented and as he valued drugs that provided learning experiences, which he felt that these substances didn't provide in his case. When asked which psychedelic he would recommend for someone who had not previously had a psychedelic experience, Shulgin would often say 2C-B.

Shulgin was a self-proclaimed and staunch libertarian in the area of psychoactive drugs, advocating personal freedom and cognitive liberty with little in the way of restrictions. He was a member of Mensa International and frequently attended Mensa events in California. Shulgin was also a Bohemian Club member and described this briefly in his book PiHKAL: A Chemical Love Story.

== Response and legacy ==
In a 2014 review of the synthesis of designer drugs, the effects of Shulgin's work were described as "by far the most far-reaching" effects associated with the cultural climate of interest at the time in hallucinogenic compounds generally and mescaline in particular, with which various artists and writers had experimented. Shulgin said that mescaline made him aware of a world submerged in human spirit, whose "availability" was "catalyzed" by such chemicals; the consequences of his insights were called "devastating" by the reviewers. In the same review, an example of his insights was given by his description of MDMA as "his low-calorie Martini".

== Bibliography ==
=== Books ===
- The Controlled Substances Act: A Resource Manual of the Current Status of the Federal Drug Laws (1st edition). Lafayette, Calif. (1988). OCLC 22676094.
- Controlled Substances: Chemical & Legal Guide to Federal Drug Laws (2nd edition). Berkeley, Calif.: Ronin Publishing (1992). ISBN 9780914171430.
- PiHKAL: A Chemical Love Story, with Ann Shulgin. Berkeley, Calif.: Transform Press (1991). ISBN 978-0-9630096-0-9.
- TiHKAL: The Continuation, with Ann Shulgin. Berkeley, Calif.: Transform Press (1997). ISBN 978-0-9630096-9-2.
- The Simple Plant Isoquinolines, with Wendy Perry. Berkeley, Calif.: Transform Press (2002). ISBN 978-0-9630096-2-3.
- The Shulgin Index, Volume One: Psychedelic Phenethylamines and Related Compounds, with Tania Manning and Paul F. Daley. Berkeley, Calif.: Transform Press (2011). ISBN 978-0-9630096-3-0.
- The Nature of Drugs: History, Pharmacology, and Social Impact, Volume One. Berkeley, Calif.: Transform Press (2021). ISBN 978-0-9995472-1-2.
- The Nature of Drugs: History, Pharmacology, and Social Impact, Volume Two. Berkeley, Calif.: Transform Press (2023). ISBN 978-0-9995472-5-0

=== Laboratory notebooks ===
- Shulgin Notebooks and Lab Books

== Documentaries ==
Documentaries about Alexander Shulgin include the following:

- Dirty Pictures (2010) by Étienne Sauret
- SiHKAL: Shulgins I Have Known and Loved (2010; Hamilton's Pharmacopeia web series; Vice Media) by Hamilton Morris
- The Love Drug (2016; I Am Rebel, S01E03; National Geographic) by Hamilton Morris
- Synthetics (2020; The Business of Drugs, S01E02; Netflix) by Nick Carew – partial, includes Ann Shulgin interview
- Better Living Through Chemistry (2021) by Connie Littlefield

== See also ==
- Bibliography of Alexander Shulgin
- List of psychedelic chemists
- Alexander Shulgin Research Institute
- Daniel Trachsel
