= Ann Shulgin =

American author (1931–2022)

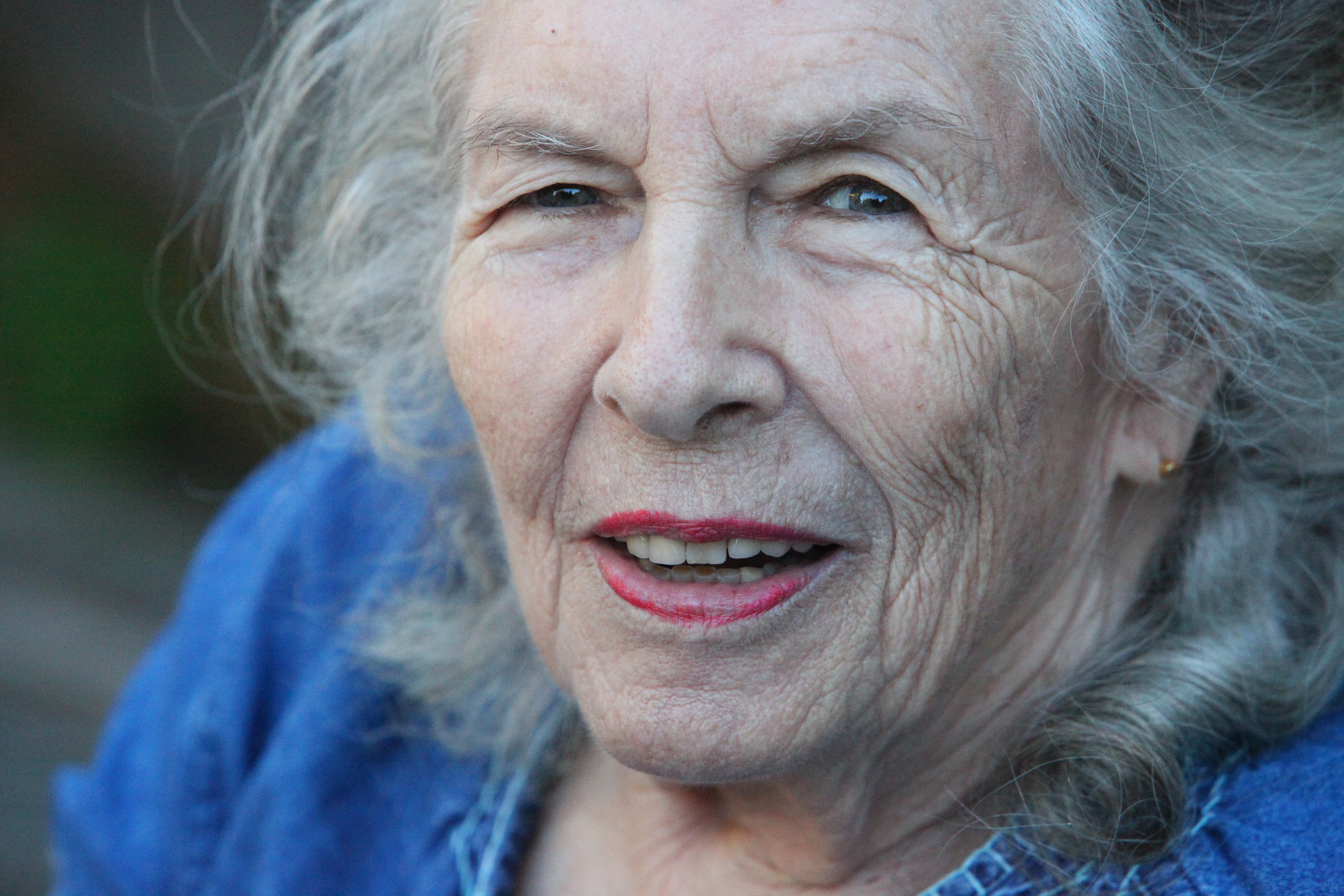
- Shulgin in 2011
- Born: Laura Ann Gotlieb; March 22, 1931; Wellington, New Zealand
- Died: July 9, 2022 (aged 91); Lafayette, California
- Occupations: Author; Therapist
- Spouse: Alexander Shulgin (m. 1981; died 2014)
- Children: Wendy Perry Tucker; Alice Garofalo; Brian Perry; Christopher McRee
- Writing career
- Pen name: Ann Perry
- Website: shulginfoundation.org shulginresearch.net transformpress.com

Laura Ann Shulgin (née Gotlieb; March 22, 1931 – July 9, 2022) was an American author and the wife of chemist Alexander Shulgin, with whom she wrote the books PiHKAL (Phenethylamines I Have Known and Loved) and TiHKAL (Tryptamines I Have Known and Loved).

== Life and career ==
Laura Ann Gotlieb was born in Wellington, New Zealand, to parents Bernard Gotlieb and Gwen Ormiston, but grew up in the village Opicina outside the Italian city Trieste. Her father was U.S. Consul in Trieste for six years before World War II. Later in her childhood, she lived in the United States, Cuba, and Canada.

During her mid-20s in the 1950s, while living in San Francisco, California, Gotlieb tried mescaline in the form of peyote, describing the experience as "one extraordinary blessed day". She studied art and became an artist, married an artist and had a child, and they later divorced. She had two more marriages ending in divorce and had three more children. Ann went back to work as a medical transcriber. She met Alexander "Sasha" Shulgin in 1978; they were married on July 4, 1981 in their back yard in Lafayette, California.

Ann worked as a Jungian lay therapist with psychedelic substances such as MDMA and 2C-B in therapeutic settings while these drugs were still legal. In her writings she stressed the potential of these drugs from a Jungian psychoanalytic perspective, as well as their use in combination with hypnotherapy. She often appeared as a speaker at conventions and continued to advocate the use of psychedelics in therapeutic contexts.

Together with her husband she authored the books PiHKAL and TiHKAL. They developed a systematic way of ranking the effects of the various drugs, known as the Shulgin Rating Scale, with a vocabulary to describe the visual, auditory and physical sensations. She also contributed to the books: Thanatos to Eros: 35 Years of Psychedelic Exploration, Entheogens and the Future of Religion, Ecstasy: The Complete Guide, The Secret Chief Revealed, Higher Wisdom: Eminent Elders Explore the Continuing Impact of Psychedelics, and Manifesting Minds: A Review of Psychedelics in Science, Medicine, Sex, and Spirituality.

Shulgin said that she had more than 2,000 psychedelic experiences during her life. Her favorite psychedelic drug was 2C-B-FLY, which she found particularly enjoyable in terms of enhanced eroticism.

According to her daughter, Shulgin had been in ill health because of chronic obstructive pulmonary disease. Shulgin died July 9, 2022, at her and her late husband's home in Lafayette.

Along with its founders Dillan DiNardo and Thomas S. Ray, Shulgin was one of the three co-owners of the psychedelic pharmaceutical company Mindstate Design Labs, founded in 2021, until her death in 2022.

== Popular culture ==
A spoken line by Shulgin is sampled in Lost Shaman's 2014 trance track Inside of You. The line is "Any drug, including MDMA, the most it can do is open up what’s inside you", which Shulgin spoke at the Horizons 2008 conference on psychedelics.

== Publications ==
- Alexander T. Shulgin; Ann Shulgin (1991). PiHKAL: A Chemical Love Story (1st ed.). Berkeley, CA: Transform Press. ISBN 978-0-9630096-0-9. OCLC 25627628.
- Alexander T. Shulgin; Ann Shulgin (1997). TiHKAL: The Continuation (1st ed.). Berkeley, CA: Transform Press. ISBN 978-0-9630096-9-2. OCLC 38503252.
- Shulgin A (1995). "The New Psychotherapy: MDMA and the Shadow". Eleusis. 3: 3–11. Archived from the original on June 20, 2024.
- Ann Shulgin (1997). "Tribute to Jacob" (PDF). In Myron J. Stolaroff (ed.). The Secret Chief: Conversations With a Pioneer of the Underground Psychedelic Therapy Movement (PDF). Charlotte, North Carolina: Multidisciplinary Association for Psychedelic Studies. ISBN 0-9660019-1-5.
- Ann Shulgin (2001). "The New Psychotherapy: MDMA and the Shadow". In Roberts TB (ed.). Psychoactive Sacramentals: Essays on Entheogens and Religion. Council on Spiritual Practices. pp. 197–204. ISBN 978-1-889725-02-4. Archived from the original on July 7, 2025.
- Ann Shulgin (2019). "Foreword". In Crowley M (ed.). Secret Drugs of Buddhism: Psychedelic Sacraments and the Origins of the Vajrayana. Synergetic Press. ISBN 978-0-907791-74-4. OCLC 1467490010.
