= Histamine N-methyltransferase =

Class of enzymes

Identifiers
- EC no.: 2.1.1.8
- CAS no.: 9029-80-5

Databases
- BRENDA: enzyme data
- ExPASy: NiceZyme view
- KEGG: enzyme entry
- MetaCyc: metabolic pathway
- Rhea: reactions
- PDB structures: RCSB PDB PDBe PDBsum
- Gene Ontology: AmiGO / QuickGO
Search
- PMC: articles
- PubMed: articles
- NCBI: proteins

histamine N-methyltransferase
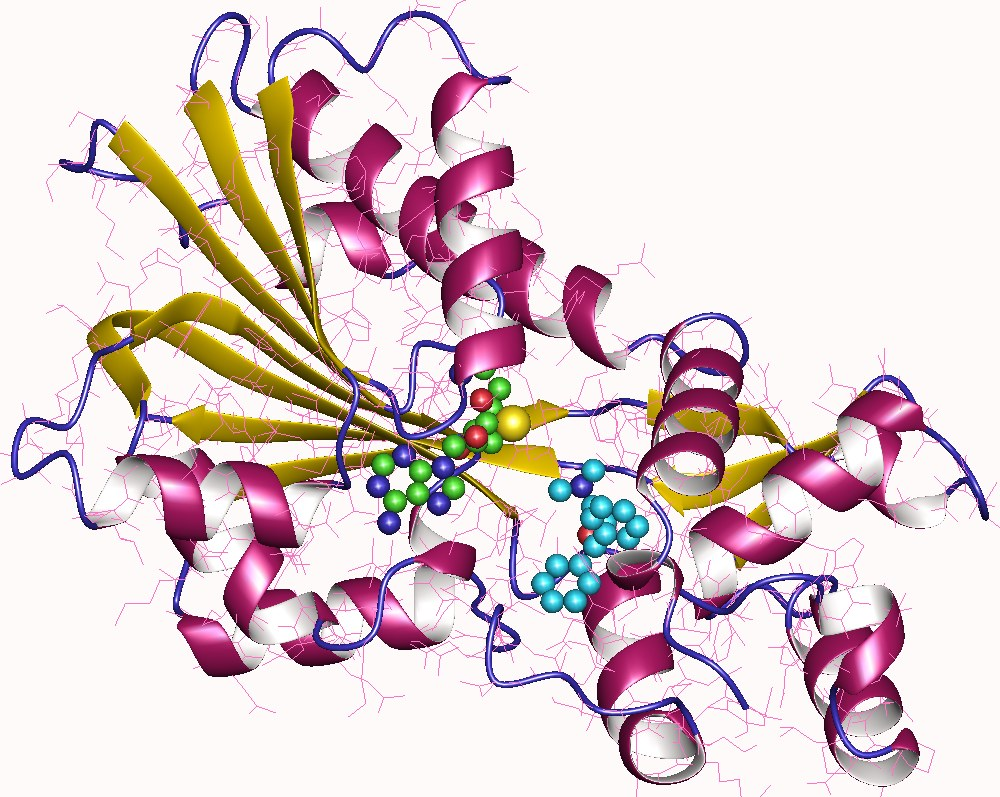

Identifiers
- Aliases: HNMT, HMT, HNMT-S1, HNMT-S2, MRT51
- External IDs: OMIM: 605238; MGI: 2153181; GeneCards: HNMT
Available structures
PDB	Ortholog search: PDBe RCSB
PDB	List of PDB id codes 1JQD, 1JQE, 2AOT, 2AOU, 2AOV, 2AOW, 2AOX
Enzyme activity
EC #	BRENDA	ExPASy	KEGG	MetaCyc
2.1.1.8	↗	↗	↗	↗

Gene location (Human)
Chr.	Chromosome 2 (human)
Band	2q22.1	Start	137,964,020 bp
Band	2q22.1	End	138,016,364 bp

Gene location (Mouse)
Chr.	Chromosome 2 (mouse)
Band	2|2 A3	Start	23,892,922 bp
Band	2|2 A3	End	23,939,406 bp
RNA expression pattern
Bgee	Human / Mouse (ortholog); Top expressed in: gallbladder; monocyte; mucosa of sigmoid colon; rectum; kidney tubule; liver; Achilles tendon; skin of hip; left ovary; bronchial epithelial cell / Top expressed in: parotid gland; granulocyte; ventral tegmental area; intercostal muscle; white adipose tissue; habenula; dorsomedial hypothalamic nucleus; right kidney; dorsal tegmental nucleus; Epithelium of choroid plexus; More reference expression data
BioGPS	n/a
Gene ontology
Molecular function	methyltransferase activity; transferase activity; N-methyltransferase activity; histamine N-methyltransferase activity
Cellular component	cytoplasm; cytosol; neuron projection; extracellular exosome
Biological process	response to immobilization stress; response to interleukin-1; positive regulation of protein targeting to mitochondrion; response to glucocorticoid; hyperosmotic response; respiratory gaseous exchange by respiratory system; response to tumor cell; brain development; response to amine; histidine catabolic process; response to cocaine; histamine catabolic process; methylation
Sources:Amigo / QuickGO
Orthologs
Databases	NCBI: entry; OMA: entry
Species	Human	Mouse
Entrez	3176	140483
Ensembl	ENSG00000150540	ENSMUSG00000026986
UniProt	P50135	Q91VF2
RefSeq (mRNA)	NM_001024074; NM_001024075; NM_006895	NM_080462
RefSeq (protein)	NP_001019245; NP_001019246; NP_008826	NP_536710
Location (UCSC)	Chr 2: 137.96 – 138.02 Mb	Chr 2: 23.89 – 23.94 Mb
PubMed search
- Wikidata
View/Edit Human	View/Edit Mouse

Histamine N-methyltransferase (HNMT) is a protein encoded by the HNMT gene in humans. It belongs to the methyltransferases superfamily of enzymes and plays a role in the inactivation of histamine, a biomolecule that is involved in various physiological processes. Methyltransferases are present in every life form including archaeans, with 230 families of methyltransferases found across species.

Specifically, HNMT transfers a methyl (-CH_{3}) group from S-adenosyl-L-methionine (SAM-e) to histamine, forming an inactive metabolite called N^{τ}-methylhistamine, in a chemical reaction called N^{τ}-methylation. In mammals, HNMT and diamine oxidase (DAO) are the only two enzymes responsible for histamine metabolism; unlike DAO, HNMT is present within the central nervous system (CNS), where it governs histaminergic neurotransmission, that is a process where histamine acts as a messenger molecule between the neurons—nerve cells—in the brain. By degrading and regulating levels of histamine within the CNS, HNMT supports neural pathways related to arousal, appetite regulation, and sleep-wake cycles.

Research on knockout mice—that are genetically modified mice lacking the Hnmt gene—has revealed that the absence of this enzyme leads to increased brain histamine concentrations and behavioral changes such as heightened aggression and disrupted sleep patterns. These findings indicate that HNMT maintains normal brain function by regulating neuronal signaling involving histamine. Genetic variants affecting HNMT activity have also been implicated in various neurological disorders like Parkinson's disease and attention deficit disorder.

== Gene ==
Histamine N-methyltransferase is encoded by a single gene, called HNMT, which has been mapped to chromosome 2 in humans.

Three transcript variants have been identified for this gene in humans, which produce different protein isoforms due to alternative splicing, which allows a single gene to code for multiple proteins by including or excluding particular exons of a gene in the final mRNA produced from that gene. Of those isoforms, only one has histamine-methylating activity.

In the human genome, six exons from the 50-kb HNMT contribute to forming a unique mRNA species, approximately 1.6 kb in size. This mRNA is then translated into the cytosolic enzyme histamine N-methyltransferase, comprising 292 amino acids, of which 130 amino acids are a conserved sequence. HNMT does not have promoter cis-elements, such as TATA and CAAT boxes.

== Protein ==
HNMT is a cytoplasmic protein, meaning that it operates within the cytoplasm of a cell. The cytoplasm fills the space between the outer cell membrane (also known as the cellular plasma membrane) and the nuclear membrane (which surrounds the cell's nucleus). HNMT helps regulate histamine levels by degrading histamine within the cytoplasm, ensuring proper cellular function.

Proteins consist of amino acid residues and form a three-dimensional structure. The crystallographic structure to depict the three-dimensional structure of human HNMT protein was first described in 2001 as a monomeric protein that has a mass of 33 kilodaltons and consists of two structural domains.

The first domain, called the "MTase domain", contains the active site where methylation occurs. The domain has a classic fold found in many other methyltransferases and consists of a seven-stranded beta-sheet surrounded by three helices on each side. This domain binds to its cofactor, S-adenosyl-L-methionine (SAM-e), which provides the methyl group for N^{τ}-methylation reactions.

The second domain, called the "substrate binding domain", interacts with histamine, contributing to its binding to the enzyme molecule. This domain is connected to the MTase domain and forms a separate region. This region includes an anti-parallel beta sheet along with additional alpha helices and 310 helices.

== Species ==
Histamine N-methyltransferase belongs to methyltransferases, a superfamily of enzymes present in every life form, including archaeans.

These enzymes catalyze methylation, which is a chemical process that involves the addition of a methyl group to a molecule, which can affect its biological function.

To carry out methylation, methyltransferases transfer a methyl group (-CH_{3}) from a cosubstrate (donor) to a substrate molecule (acceptor), leading to the formation of a methylated molecule. Most methyltransferases use S-adenosyl-L-methionine (SAM-e) as a donor, converting it into S-adenosyl-L-homocysteine (SAH). In various species, members of the methyltransferase superfamily of enzymes methylate a wide range of molecules, including small molecules, proteins, nucleic acids, and lipids. These enzymes are involved in numerous cellular processes such as signaling, protein repair, chromatin regulation, and gene regulation. More than 230 families of methyltransferases have been described in various species.

This specific protein, histamine N-methyltransferase, is found in vertebrates, including mammals, birds, reptiles, amphibians, and fishes, but not in invertebrates and plants.

The complementary DNA (cDNA) of Hnmt was initially cloned from a rat kidney and has since been cloned from human, mouse, and guinea pig sources. Human HNMT shares 55.37% similarity with that of zebrafish, 86.76% with that of mouse, 90.53% with that of dog, and 99.54% with that of chimpanzee. Moreover, expressed sequence tags from cow, pig, and gorilla, as well as genome survey sequences from pufferfish, also exhibit strong similarity to human HNMT, suggesting that it is a highly conserved protein among vertebrates. To understand the role of histamine N-methyltransferase in brain function, researchers have studied Hnmt-deficient (knockout) mice, that were genetically modified to have the Hnmt gene "knocked out", i.e., deactivated. Disrupting the gene led to a marked rise in histamine levels in the mouse brain, showing the gene's role in the brain's histamine system and suggesting that HNMT genetic variations in humans could be linked to brain disorders.

== Tissue and subcellular distribution ==
On subcellular distribution, histamine N-methyltransferase protein in humans is mainly localized to the nucleoplasm (which is an organelle, i.e., a subunit of a cell) and cytosol (which is the intracellular fluid, i.e., a fluid inside cells). In addition, it is localized to the centrosome (another organelle).

In humans, the protein is present in many tissues and is most abundantly expressed in the brain, thyroid gland, bronchus, duodenum, liver, gallbladder, kidney, and skin.

== Function ==
Biological inactivation of histamine via N^{τ}-methylation by the histamine N-methyltransferase (HNMT) enzyme using S-adenosyl-L-methionine (SAM-e) as a cosubstrate and a donor of methyl (CH_{3}) functional group (the biochemical transformation is depicted as in KEGG reaction R02155). The methyl group from the cosubstrate (denoted by red oval) is transferred to histamine to N^{τ} position that forms N^{τ}-methylhistamine (NMT), which has the methyl group attached (denoted by green oval). The conversion of histamine to NMT is shown by the straight arrow. The SAM-e is thereby transformed to S-adenosyl-L-histidine (SAH), a molecule without the methyl group. The conversion of SAM-e to SAH is shown by the curved arrow.

The function of the HNMT enzyme is histamine metabolism by ways of N^{τ}-methylation using S-adenosyl-L-methionine (SAM-e) as the methyl donor, producing N^{τ}-methylhistamine, which, unless excreted, can be further processed by monoamine oxidase B (MAOB) or by diamine oxidase (DAO). Methylated histamine metabolites are excreted with urine.

In mammals, there are two main ways to inactivate histamine by metabolism: one is through a process called oxidative deamination, which involves the enzyme diamine oxidase (DAO) produced by the AOC1 gene, and the other is through a process called N^{τ}-methylation, which involves the enzyme N-methyltransferase. In the context of biochemistry, inactivation by metabolism refers to the process where a substance, such as a hormone, is converted into a form that is no longer active or effective (inactivation), via a process where the substance is chemically altered (metabolism).

HNMT and DAO are two enzymes that play distinct roles in histamine metabolism. DAO is primarily responsible for metabolizing histamine in extracellular (outside cells) fluids, which include interstitial fluid (fluid surrounding cells) and blood plasma. Such histamine can be exogenous (from food or intestinal flora) or endogenous (released from granules of mast cells and basophils, such as during allergic reactions). DAO is predominantly expressed in the cells of the intestinal epithelium and placenta but not in the central nervous system (CNS). In contrast, HNMT is expressed in CNS and involved in the metabolism of intracellular (inside cells) histamine, which is primarily endogenous and persistently present. HNMT operates in the cytosol, which is the fluid inside cells. Histamine is required to be carried into the cytosol through transporters such as plasma membrane monoamine transporter (SLC29A4) or organic cation transporter 3 (SLC22A3). HNMT enzyme is found in cells of diverse tissues: neurons and glia, brain, kidneys, liver, bronchi, large intestine, ovary, prostate, spinal cord, spleen, and trachea, etc. While DAO is primarily found in the intestinal epithelium, HNMT is present in a wider range of tissues throughout the body. This difference in location also requires different transport mechanisms for histamine to reach each enzyme, reflecting the distinct roles of these enzymes in histamine metabolism. Another distinction between HNMT and DAO lies in their substrate specificity. While HNMT has a strong preference for histamine, DAO can metabolize other biogenic amines—substances, produced by a life form (like a bacteria or an animal) that has an amine functional group (−NH_{2}). The examples of biogenic amines besides histamine that DAO can metabolize are putrescine and cadaverine; still, DAO has a preference for histamine. Both DAO and HNMT exhibit comparable affinities toward histamine.

In the brain of mammals, histamine takes part in histaminergic neurotransmission, that is a process where histamine acts as a messenger molecule between the neurons—the nerve cells. Histamine neurotransmitter activity is controlled by HNMT, since DAO is not present in the CNS. Consequently, the deactivation of histamine via HNMT represents the sole mechanism for ending neurotransmission within the mammalian CNS. HNMT therefore controls the brain's histamine system.

== Physiological and clinical significance ==
=== Role in health ===
Histamine has important roles in human physiology as both a hormone and a neurotransmitter. As a hormone, it is involved in the inflammatory response and itching. It regulates physiological functions in the gut and acts on the brain, spinal cord, and uterus. As a neurotransmitter, histamine promotes arousal and regulates appetite and the sleep-wake cycle. It also affects vasodilation, fluid production in tissues like the nose and eyes, gastric acid secretion, sexual function, and immune responses.

HNMT is the only enzyme in the human body responsible for metabolizing histamine within the CNS, playing a role in brain function.

HNMT plays a role in maintaining the proper balance of histamine in the human body. HNMT is responsible for the breakdown and metabolism of histamine, converting it into an inactive metabolite, N^{τ}-methylhistamine, which inhibits HNMT gene expression in a negative feedback loop. By metabolizing histamine, HNMT helps prevent excessive levels of histamine from accumulating in various tissues and organs. This enzymatic activity ensures that histamine remains at appropriate levels to carry out its physiological functions without causing unwanted effects or triggering allergic reactions. In the central nervous system, HNMT plays an essential role in degrading histamine, where it acts as a neurotransmitter, since HNMT is the only enzyme in the body that can metabolize histamine in the CNS, ending its neurotransmitter activity.

HNMT also plays a role in the airway response to harmful particles, which is the body's physiological reaction to immune allergens, bacteria, or viruses in the respiratory system. Histamine is stored in granules in mast cells, basophils, and in the synaptic vesicles of histaminergic neurons of the airways. When exposed to immune allergens or harmful particles, histamine is released from these storage granules and quickly diffuses into the surrounding tissues. However, the released histamine needs to be rapidly deactivated for proper regulation, which is a function of HNMT.

=== Histamine intolerance ===
Histamine intolerance is a presumed set of adverse reactions to ingested histamine in food believed to be associated with flawed activity of DAO and HNMT enzymes. This set of reactions include cutaneous reactions (such as itching, flushing and edema), gastrointestinal symptoms (such as abdominal pain and diarrhea), respiratory symptoms (such as runny nose and nasal congestion), and neurological symptoms (such as dizziness and headache). However, belief in a link between DAO and HNMT enzymes and adverse reactions to ingested histamine in food is not shared by mainstream science due to insufficient evidence. The exact underlying mechanisms by which deficiency in these enzymes can cause these adverse reactions are not fully understood but are hypothesized to involve genetic factors. Despite extensive research, there are no definitive, objective measures or indicators that could unambiguously define histamine intolerance as a distinct medical condition.

=== Activity measurements ===
The activity of HNMT, unlike that of DAO, cannot be measured by blood (serum) analysis.

Organs that produce DAO continuously release it into the bloodstream. DAO is stored in vesicular structures associated with the plasma membrane in epithelial cells. As a result, serum DAO activity can be measured, but not HNMT. The reason is that HNMT is primarily found within the cells of internal organs like the brain or liver and is not released to the bloodstream. Measuring intracellular HNMT directly is challenging. Therefore, diagnosis of HNMT activity is typically done indirectly by testing for known genetic variants.

=== Genetic variants ===
There is a genetic variant, registered in the Single Nucleotide Polymorphism database (dbSNP) as rs11558538, found in 10% of the population worldwide, which means that the T allele presents at position 314 of HNMT instead of a usual C allele (c.314C>T). This variant causes the protein to be synthesized with threonine (Thr) replaced with isoleucine (Ile) at position 105 (p.Thr105Ile, T105I). This variant is described as loss-of-function allele reducing HNMT activity, and is associated with diseases such as asthma, allergic rhinitis, and atopic eczema (atopic dermatitis). For individuals with this variant, the intake of HNMT inhibitors, which hamper enzyme activity, and histamine liberators, which release histamine from the granules of mast cells and basophils, could potentially influence their histamine levels. Still, this genetic variant is associated with a reduced risk of Parkinson's disease.

Experiments involving Hnmt-knockout mice have shown that a deficiency in HNMT indeed leads to increased brain histamine concentrations, resulting in heightened aggressive behaviors and disrupted sleep-wake cycles in these mice. In humans, genetic variants that affect HNMT activity have been implicated in various brain disorders, such as Parkinson's disease and attention deficit disorder, but it remains unclear whether these alterations in HNMT are a primary cause or secondary effect of these conditions. Additionally, reduced histamine levels in cerebrospinal fluid have been consistently reported in patients with narcolepsy and other conditions characterized by excessive daytime sleepiness. The association between HNMT polymorphisms and gastrointestinal diseases is still uncertain. While mild polymorphisms can lead to diseases such as asthma and inflammatory bowel disease, they may also reduce the risk of brain disorders like Parkinson's disease. On the other hand, severe mutations in HNMT can result in intellectual disability. Despite these findings, the role of HNMT in human health is not fully understood.

=== Inhibitors ===
The following substances are known to be HNMT inhibitors: amodiaquine, chloroquine, dimaprit, etoprine, metoprine, quinacrine, SKF-91488, tacrine, and diphenhydramine. HNMT inhibitors may increase histamine levels in peripheral tissues and aggravate conditions associated with histamine excess, such as allergic rhinitis, urticaria, and peptic ulcer disease. The effect of HNMT inhibitors on brain function is not yet fully understood. New HNMT inhibitors that increase brain histamine levels are being investigated as potential treatments for brain disorders.

=== Methamphetamine overdose ===
HNMT could be a potential target for the treatment of symptoms of methamphetamine overdose. It is a central nervous system stimulant, which can be abused up to lethal consequences: numerous deaths related to methamphetamine overdoses have been reported. The reasoning behind this is that such overdose often leads to behavioral abnormalities, and it has been observed that elevated levels of histamine in the brain can attenuate these methamphetamine-induced behaviors. Therefore, by targeting HNMT, it might be possible to increase the levels of histamine in the brain, which could, in turn, help to mitigate the effects of a methamphetamine overdose. This effect could be achieved by using HNMT inhibitors. Studies predict that one such inhibitor can be metoprine, which crosses the blood-brain barrier and can potentially increase brain histamine levels by inhibiting HNMT; still, as of 2024, treatment of methamphetamine overdose by HNMT inhibitors is still an area of research.

=== N^{τ}-methylhistamine ===
N^{τ}-methylhistamine (N^{τ}MH), also known as 1-methylhistamine, is a product of N^{τ}-methylation of histamine in a reaction catalyzed by the HNMT enzyme.

N^{τ}MH is considered a biologically inactive metabolite of histamine. N^{τ}MH is excreted in the urine and can be measured to estimate the amounts of active histamine in the body. While N^{τ}MH has some biological activity on its own, it is much weaker than histamine. N^{τ}MH can bind to histamine receptors but has a lower affinity and efficacy than histamine for these receptors, meaning that it binds less strongly and activates them less effectively. Depending on the receptor subtype and the tissue context, N^{τ}MH may act as a partial agonist or an antagonist for some histamine receptors. N^{τ}MH may have some modulatory effects on histamine signaling, but it is unlikely to cause significant allergic or inflammatory reactions by itself. N^{τ}MH may also be a feedback mechanism to regulate histamine levels and prevent excessive histamine release. Still, NMT, being a product in a reaction catalyzed by HNMT, may inhibit expression of HNMT in a negative feedback loop.

Urinary N^{τ}MH can be measured in clinical settings when systemic mastocytosis is suspected. Systemic mastocytosis and anaphylaxis are typically associated with at least a two-fold increase in urinary N^{τ}MH levels, which are also increased in patients taking monoamine oxidase inhibitors and in patients on histamine-rich diets.
