= ZFP62 =

Gene in Humans

Identifiers
- Aliases: ZFP62, ZET, ZNF755, ZFP62 zinc finger protein
- External IDs: OMIM: 610281; MGI: 99662; GeneCards: ZFP62

Gene location (Human)
Chr.	Chromosome 5 (human)
Band	5q35.3	Start	180,847,611 bp
Band	5q35.3	End	180,861,285 bp

Gene location (Mouse)
Chr.	Chromosome 11 (mouse)
Band	11 B1.2|11 29.23 cM	Start	49,094,119 bp
Band	11 B1.2|11 29.23 cM	End	49,109,643 bp
RNA expression pattern
Bgee	Human / Mouse (ortholog); Top expressed in: ganglionic eminence; sural nerve; Achilles tendon; internal globus pallidus; ventricular zone; oocyte; tendon of biceps brachii; corpus epididymis; amniotic fluid; thymus / Top expressed in: genital tubercle; tail of embryo; ventricular zone; intercostal muscle; pineal gland; spermatocyte; thymus; ganglionic eminence; Gonadal ridge; maxillary prominence; More reference expression data
BioGPS	n/a
Gene ontology
Molecular function	nucleic acid binding; metal ion binding; DNA-binding transcription factor activity, RNA polymerase II-specific
Cellular component	nucleus
Biological process	transcription, DNA-templated; regulation of transcription, DNA-templated; regulation of transcription by RNA polymerase II
Sources:Amigo / QuickGO
Orthologs
Databases	NCBI: entry; OMA: entry
Species	Human	Mouse
Entrez	643836	22720
Ensembl	ENSG00000196670	ENSMUSG00000046311
UniProt	Q8NB50	Q8C827
RefSeq (mRNA)	NM_001172638; NM_152283	NM_001024846; NM_009562; NM_001362725; NM_001362726; NM_001362727 NM_001362728; NM_001362729; NM_001362730; NM_001362731
RefSeq (protein)	NP_001166109; NP_689496; NP_001364868; NP_001364869; NP_001364870 NP_001364871; NP_001364872; NP_001364873; NP_001364874	NP_001020017; NP_033588; NP_001349654; NP_001349655; NP_001349656 NP_001349657; NP_001349658; NP_001349659; NP_001349660
Location (UCSC)	Chr 5: 180.85 – 180.86 Mb	Chr 11: 49.09 – 49.11 Mb
PubMed search
- Wikidata
View/Edit Human	View/Edit Mouse

Zinc Finger Protein 62, also known as "ZNF62," "ZNF755," or "ZET," is a protein that in humans is encoded by the ZFP62 gene. ZFP62 is part of the Cys_{2}His_{2} Zinc Finger family of genes.

== Gene ==
ZFP62 is located on chromosome 5 (5q35.5) on the minus strand, from base pair 180,826,870 to 180,861,285. It spans a total of 34,415 base pairs. The ZFP62 gene has 7 transcripts (splice variants), 5 known paralogues, and several mammalian orthologues.

=== Tissue expression ===
The ZFP62 gene is ubiquitously expressed but variable across all tissue types. The gene appears in 35 different tissue types, with the thymus, thalamus, thyroid, kidney, prostate, testes, and ovaries expressing the highest levels. Additionally, there are low levels of specificity across all human tissue types for ZFP62 compared to other human proteins, as well as low levels of cancer specificity within both cell line cancer and TGCA cancer tissues.

== Protein ==
The most commonly recognized "cannon" ZFP62 protein is Isoform 2, which is 900 amino acids in length and contains 2 coding exons. The full protein weighs approximately 102.5 kDa. The isoelectric point of the ZFP62 protein is 9.24, meaning that the protein is negatively charged at neutral pH.

The ZFP62 protein is known to function both within RNA polymerase II cis-regulatory region sequence-specific DNA-binding and RNA polymerase II-specific DNA-binding transcription activator activity.

The predicted tertiary structure of the ZFP62 protein in humans, as generated by AlphaFold.

=== Composition and motifs ===
The most crucial compositional motif lies within the Cys_{2}His_{2} structural zinc finger repeats. The Cys2His2 zinc finger repeats function as a binding mechanism for a zinc, or other metal ion. The structure of this motif is two ligands from a knuckle and two more from the c-terminus of a helix. It is thought that these domains are crucial to the regulation of transcription for both DNA and RNA. The ZFP62 protein contains 26 of these repeats.

There is one disordered region present between amino acids 1 and 97.

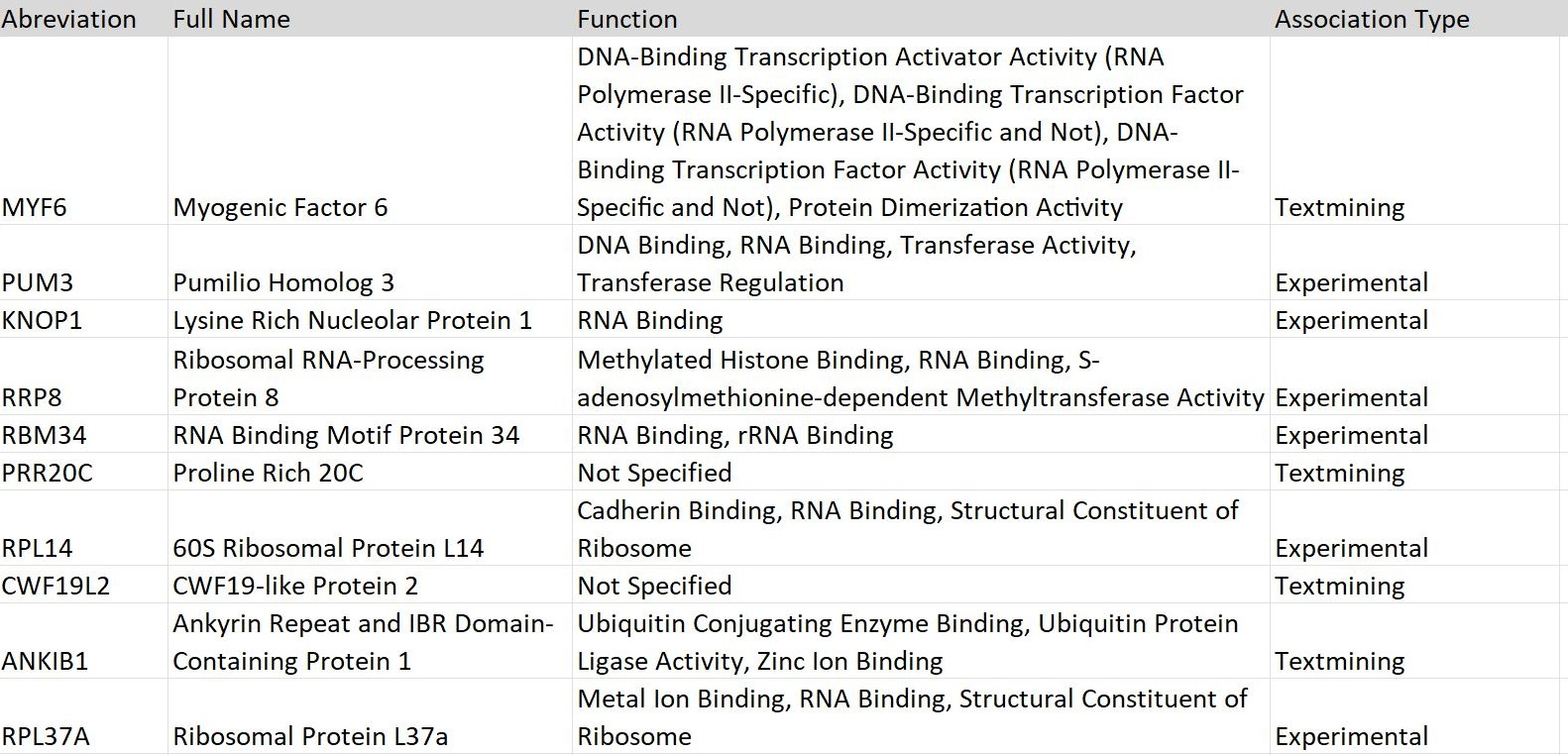
A table of the protein interactions of the ZFP62 protein in humans. This data was compiled from the STRING Database. Interacting proteins are organized by highest to lowest scores, from 0.769 to 0.477 respectively.

=== Secondary structure ===
The secondary structure of the ZFP62 protein is composed of a mixture of alpha-helices, beta-sheets, and turns, with alpha-helices being the most abundant secondary structure.

=== Tertiary structure ===
The tertiary structure of the ZFP62 protein appears as a double-coiled structure, with alpha-helices being twisted into a larger coiled shape. The highest confidence in this structure comes from the 26 smaller coils, correlating with the 26 zinc finger repeats that are present within the protein.

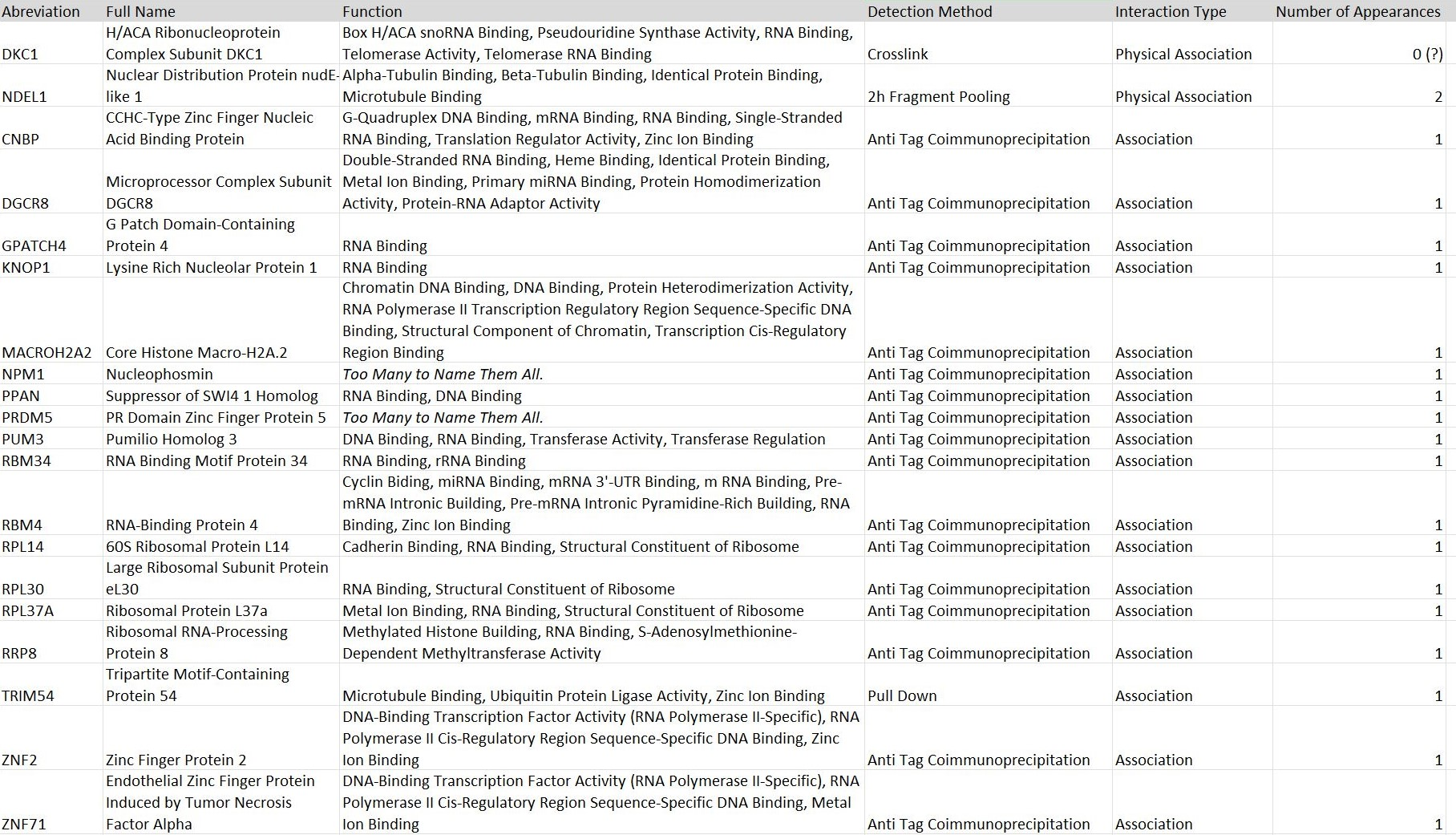
A table detailing the interactions between ZFP62 and other proteins in humans. This data was compiled from the IntAct Database. Interacting proteins are organized by highest to lowest MI scores, from 0.4 to 0.35 respectively, and then alphabetically.

This structure is consistent and nearly identical across all orthologous species.

=== Protein interactions ===
The ZFP62 protein is known to interact with many proteins, as seen in the following figures. The most common function among these proteins is that of managing RNA binding.

Among all of the proteins ZFP62 is thought to interact with, only a five that appear on multiple databases, and therefore have a higher likelihood of interaction: The KNOP1, PUM3, RBM34, RPL14, and RPL37A proteins. All of these proteins appear to have RNA binding functionality, but otherwise seem reasonably distinct from one another.

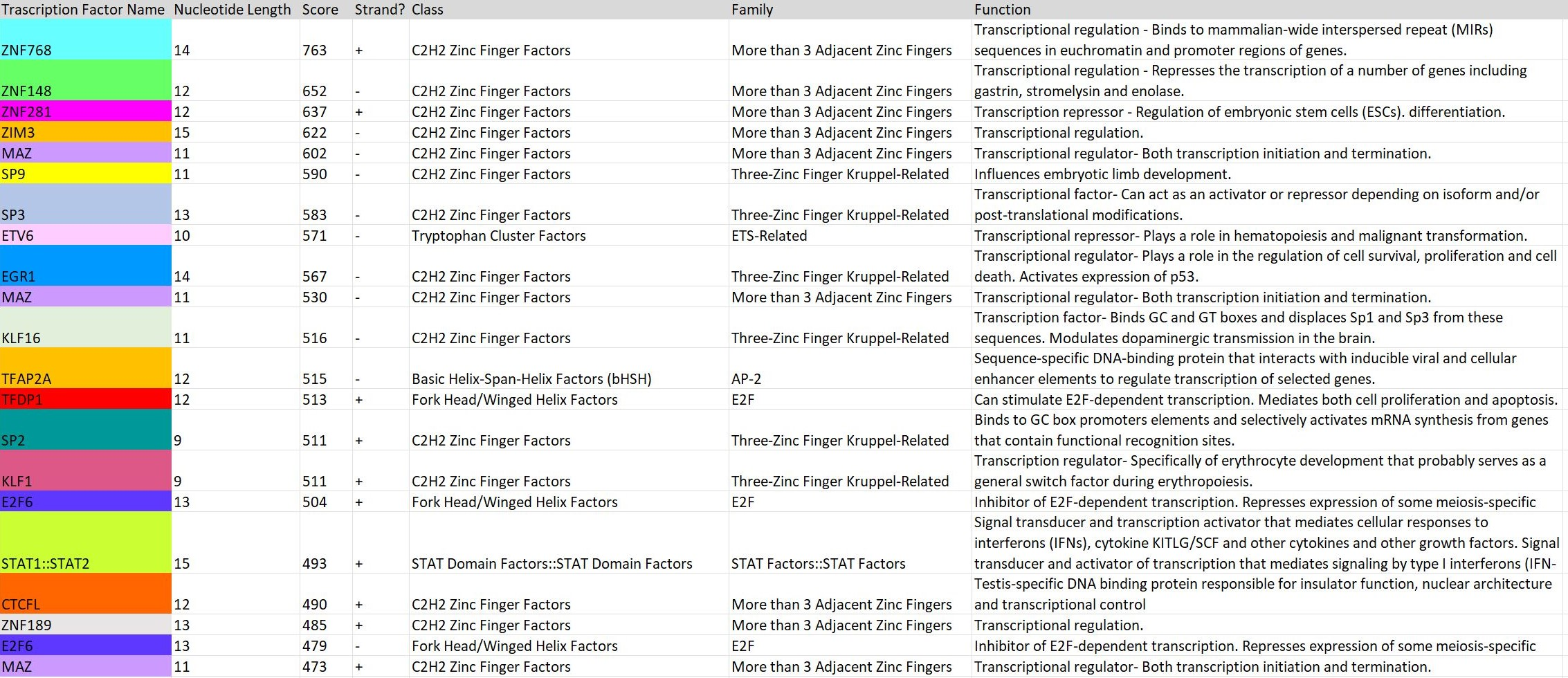
A table highlighting transcription factors within the promoter region of the ZFP62 gene in humans. Generated using data from UCSC Genome Browser. Inclusion of the transcription factors were based on highest matrix scores, the presence of the sequence within the excerpt, the sequence's similarity to its known sequence, and the repetition of the sequence within the excerpt.

== Regulation ==
=== Promoter ===
ZFP62 has one known promoter, named EH38E2437834. EH38E2437834 spans 354 base pairs and is only associated with the ZFP62 gene. EH38E2437834 has been shown to be associated with ZFP62 through 15 different biosamples and eQTL experimentation.

==== Promoter-region transcription factors ====
There are hundreds of transcription factors that are predicted to bind the promoter region of the ZFP62 gene. The following table highlights 20 of these transcription factors, with high binding affinity.

== Homology and evolution ==
=== Paralogues ===
In humans, the ZFP62 gene is paralogous with 5 other Zinc Finger Proteins, as seen in the following table. All five of these paralogues share similar functionality and localization to ZFP62- They are all RNA/DNA transcription factors and are primarily localized to the cell nucleus.

Human ZFP62 Paralogues
Gene Symbol	Full Gene Name	Gene Location	NCBI Gene ID
ZNF648	Zinc Finger Protein 648	1q25.3	127665
ZNF808	Zinc Finger Protein 808	19q13.41	388558
ZNF664	Zinc Finger Protein 664	12q24.31	144348
ZNF721	Zinc Finger Protein 721	4p16.3	170960
ZNF485	Zinc Finger Protein 648	10q11.21	220992

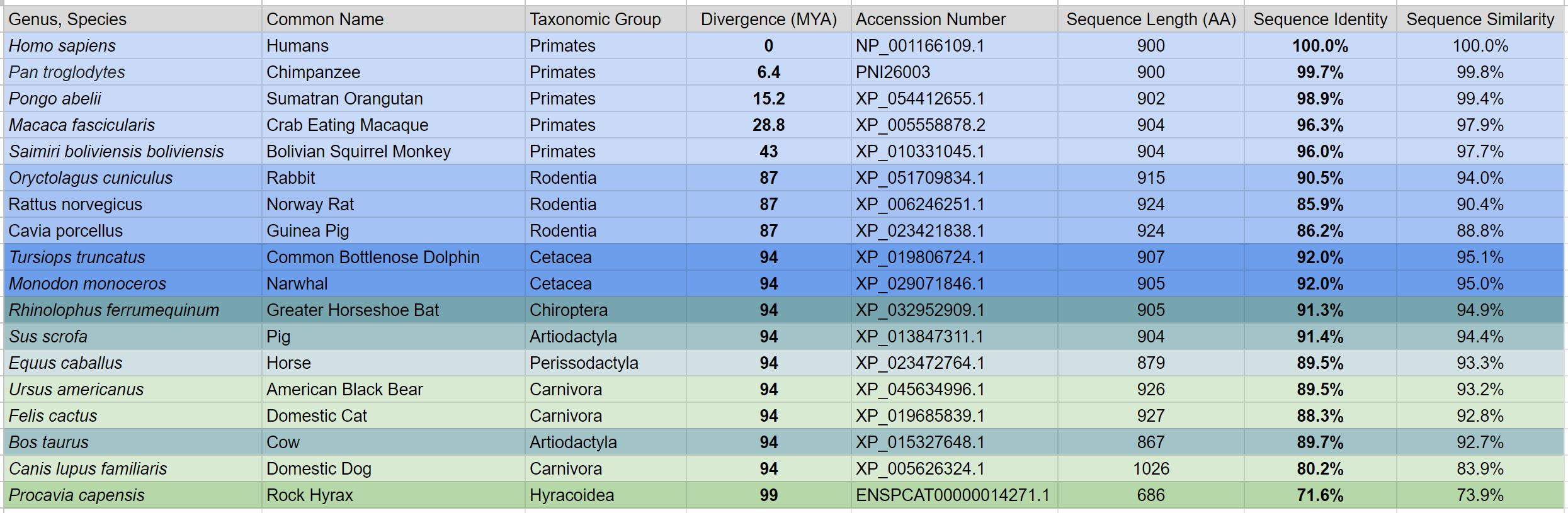
A table comparing members of each taxonomic group that the ZFP62 gene appears in, compared to the Homo sapiens ZFP62 protein. Generated using NCBI and NCBI Orthologue Viewer. All species are mammalian in nature and therefore colored based on their Taxonomic Group. The table is organized based on the "Divergence" category. If two species had the same estimated date of "Divergence," the table was then sorted by "Sequence Identity."

=== Orthologues ===
ZFP62 orthologues are only found in mammalian species. The orthologues appear primarily in placental mammals, including Primates, Rodentia, Cetacea, Chiroptera, Aritodactyla, Perissodactyla, and Carnivora.

==== Conservation across orthologues ====
Conservation is varied across orthologous species, with the least similar orthologue being from the Carnivora and Hyracoidea taxonomic groups.

== Clinical significance ==
The ZFP62 gene has been linked to a variety of different human ailments. In a more recent study, ZFP62 has been discovered to be a potential therapeutic target for treatment of SARS-CoV-2 (COVID-19). The role of zinc finger protein as transcription factors can be utilized to target genes to participate in the removal of SARS infection. The drug that is predicted to be able to target ZFP62 is named Artenimol, which would inhibit the RNA-dependent RNA polymerase activity of ZFP62, which is known to be an effective mechanism of other COVID-19 treatment drugs.

In two other publications, ZFP62 was discovered to be a mechanism of hippocampal aging in the brain, as well as lymphoblastic leukemia. In the case of hippocampal aging, ZFP62 was found to be significantly upregulated within the hippocampus of aged patients. It is speculated that this gene, as well as another zinc finger protein named ZFP51, may be specifically related to increased neuroinflammation within the hippocampal region. Another study, completed in 2016, focusing on the deletion of terminal 5q in HOXA-positive T-cell acute lymphoblastic leukemia, found that ZFP62 was one of only eight significantly down-regulated genes. This discovery also indicates that the inhibition of ZFP62 significantly contributes to the onset of this particular form of leukemia.
