= Imidazole-4-acetaldehyde =

Names
- Other names 1H-Imidazole-5-acetaldehyde, 1H-Imidazole-5-acetaldehyde, Imidazole-4-acetaldehyde, 1H-Imidazole-4-acetaldehyde, Imidazole-5-acetaldehyde, 4-Imidazolylacetaldehyde, 2-(1H-Imidazol-4-yl)acetaldehyde, 2-(1H-Imidazol-5-yl)acetaldehyde

Identifiers
CAS Number	645-14-7
3D model (JSmol)	Interactive image
ChEBI	CHEBI:27398
ChemSpider	132948
KEGG	C05130
PubChem CID	150841
UNII	B4S3Z68DDD
CompTox Dashboard (EPA)	DTXSID60214747
- InChI: InChI=1S/C5H6N2O/c8-2-1-5-3-6-4-7-5/h2-4H,1H2,(H,6,7) Key: MQSRGWNVEZRLDK-UHFFFAOYSA-N
- SMILES: C1=C(NC=N1)CC=O

Properties
Chemical formula	C_{5}H_{6}N_{2}
Molar mass	94.117 g·mol^{−1}
- Except where otherwise noted, data are given for materials in their standard state (at 25 °C [77 °F], 100 kPa). Infobox references

Imidazole-4-acetaldehyde is a metabolite of histamine in biological species.

== Biological inactivation of histamine ==
The process of histamine inactivation in biological species involves its metabolism through the oxidative deamination of its primary amino group. This reaction is catalyzed by the enzyme diamine oxidase (DAO). The metabolite produced from this reaction is imidazole-4-acetaldehyde.

Imidazole-4-acetaldehyde is then further oxidized by a NAD-dependent aldehyde dehydrogenase, leading to imidazole-4-acetic acid.

== Synthesis under prebiotic conditions ==
Under prebiotic conditions, imidazole-4-acetaldehyde can be synthesized from erythrose, formamidine, formaldehyde, and ammonia.

== Role in fungal amine oxidase and bacterial aldehyde oxidase ==
In a study of imidazole-4-acetaldehyde presence in the reaction mixture during the coupling reaction of fungal amine oxidase and bacterial aldehyde oxidase for histamine elimination, imidazole 4-acetaldehyde was not detected, which suggests that imidazole 4-acetaldehyde was not produced as a result of the coupling reaction between fungal amine oxidase and aldehyde oxidase, as such, its absence in the reaction mixture implies that the fungal amine oxidase-aldehyde oxidase coupling reaction likely proceeded directly from histamine to imidazole-4-acetic acid with an apparent yield of 100%, without the intermediate formation of imidazole 4-acetaldehyde.

== Postoperative opioid prediction ==
In a 2022 observational study aimed to identify preoperative serum metabolites that could predict postoperative opioid consumption, the role of imidazole-4-acetaldehyde was identified as one of the metabolites that showed different trends between gastric cancer patients with high postoperative opioid consumption and those with low opioid consumption group. The results suggest that imidazole-4-acetaldehyde, along with other metabolites, was significantly different between the two groups, so that that imidazole-4-acetaldehyde may be a potential biomarker for predicting postoperative opioid consumption in gastric cancer patients, still, the results of this study is inconclusive.
