= Formylaspartate deformylase =

Class of enzymes

Identifiers
- EC no.: 3.5.1.8
- CAS no.: 9025-09-6

Databases
- BRENDA: enzyme data
- ExPASy: NiceZyme view
- KEGG: enzyme entry
- MetaCyc: metabolic pathway
- Rhea: reactions
- PDB structures: RCSB PDB PDBe PDBsum
- Gene Ontology: AmiGO / QuickGO
Search
- PMC: articles
- PubMed: articles
- NCBI: proteins

Formylaspartate deformylase (EC 3.5.1.8) is an enzyme that catalyzes the chemical reaction

N-formyl-L-aspartic acid
H_{2}O
aspartic acid
+
formic acid

The enzyme characterised from Pseudomonas species hydrolyses N-formyl-L-aspartic acid to aspartic acid and formic acid. This reaction is part of the catabolism of imidazoleacetic acid.

This enzyme is a hydrolase, one acting on carbon-nitrogen bonds other than peptide bonds, specifically in linear amides. The systematic name of this enzyme class is N-formyl-L-aspartate amidohydrolase. This enzyme is also called formylaspartic formylase (formylase I, formylase II).
