= Diamine oxidase =

Enzyme

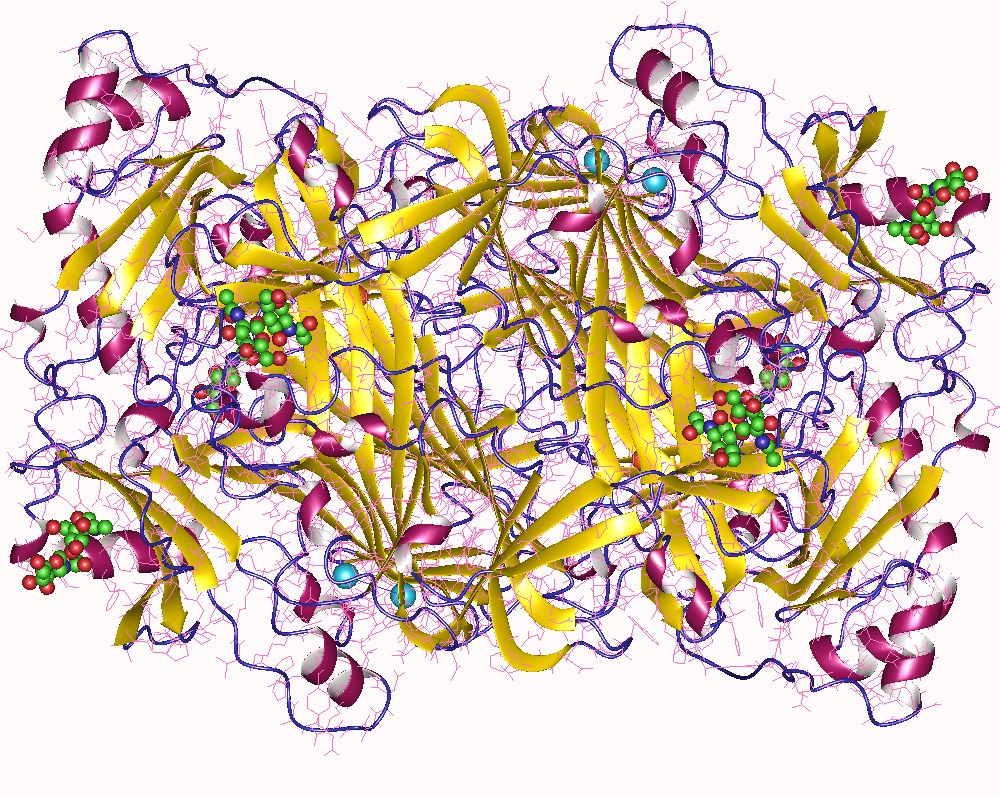
- Diamine oxidase dimer, Human

Identifiers
- EC no.: 1.4.3.22

Databases
- BRENDA: enzyme data
- ExPASy: NiceZyme view
- KEGG: enzyme entry
- MetaCyc: metabolic pathway
- Rhea: reactions
- PDB structures: RCSB PDB PDBe PDBsum
- Gene Ontology: AmiGO / QuickGO
Search
- PMC: articles
- PubMed: articles
- NCBI: proteins

Diamine oxidase (DAO), also known as amine oxidase, copper-containing, 1 (AOC1), formerly called histaminase, is an enzyme (EC 1.4.3.22) involved in the metabolism, oxidation, and inactivation of histamine and other polyamines such as putrescine or spermidine. The enzyme belongs to the amine oxidase (copper-containing) (AOC) family of amine oxidase enzymes.

The enzyme is expressed in bilateria, a biological group of animals. The enzyme is encoded by the AOC1 gene. This gene is highly conserved across the bilateria group which includes mammals, birds, reptiles, fish and insects, to name a few.

== Chemical activity ==
=== Histamine metabolites ===
Histamine, a biogenic amine, undergoes metabolism through three distinct enzymatic pathways:

1. The first pathway (see the reaction illustrated below) involves the deamination of histamine by the enzyme diamine oxidase to form imidazole acetaldehyde.
2. In the second pathway, histamine is metabolized into N^{τ}-methylhistamine (also known as 1-methylhistamine), which also has some biological activity, albeit much weaker than that of histamine. Still, NMT, being a product in a reaction catalyzed by HNMT, may inhibit expression of HNMT in a negative feedback loop. This reaction is N^{τ}-methylation of histamine by the histamine N-methyltransferase (HNMT) enzyme. The N^{τ}-methylhistamine, unless excreted by the kindney, is subsequently oxidized into N^{τ}-methylimidazoleacetic acid (N^{τ}-MIAA) by the enzyme monoamine oxidase (MAO). This two-step process reduces the activity of histamine in the body and is important for quick deactivation of histamine in the brain.
3. The third pathway is found exclusively in enterobacteria and has not been identified in mammals. This pathway involves the acetylation of histamine by an acetylase to form 4-(-acetylaminoethyl)imidazole.

DAO catalyzes the oxidative deamination of polyamines, such as histamine and putrescine, to produce aminoaldehydes, hydrogen peroxide, and ammonia.

=== Reaction catalyzed by DAO ===
DAO metabolizes histamine into imidazole-4-acetaldehyde:

histamine
+ O_{2}
H_{2}O
NH_{3}
H_{2}O
NH_{3}
Imidazole-4-acetaldehyde
+ HO-OH

Imidazole-4-acetaldehyde is then further oxidized by a NAD-dependent aldehyde dehydrogenase, leading to imidazole-4-acetic acid.

== Biological role ==
DAO is involved in the physiology of digestion and other physiological processes, such as inflammation, immune response, and wound healing. Dysfunction of DAO has been associated with various diseases, including allergies, autoimmune disorders, and cancer. DAO also plays a role in healthy pregnancy in placental mammals.

In case of a shortage or low enzymatic activity of diamine oxidase in the human body, it may appear as an allergy or histamine intolerance.

== Expression ==
In placental mammals, including humans, the highest levels of DAO expression are observed in the digestive tract (intestinal mucosa) and the placenta. DAO expression is also observed in kidney of various species.

DAO is also expressed in eosinophils.

== The role in human pregnancy ==
In humans, a certain subtype of cells of the placenta, namely the extravillous trophoblasts, express the enzyme and secrete it into the blood stream of a pregnant woman.

During pregnancy, DAO helps maintaining fetal growth and development by regulating histamine levels. DAO levels in the blood circulation increase vastly in pregnant women suggesting a protective mechanism against adverse histamine. Histamine is a potent vasodilator and can cause uterine contractions, which can lead to premature labor. DAO in the placenta breaks down histamine to prevent its accumulation and maintain a healthy pregnancy. Low levels of DAO in the placenta may contribute to preeclampsia, a pregnancy-related disorder characterized by mother's high blood pressure and damage to mother's organs such as the liver and kidneys; the baby may also be affected if the condition is severe or left untreated, but it is not the primary target of the disorder.

Lowered diamine oxidase values in maternal blood in early pregnancy might be an indication for trophoblast-related pregnancy disorders like early-onset preeclampsia.

== Supplementation ==
Exogenous DAO (supplements) are being studied as complementary treatment for the relief of symptoms associated with histamine intolerance, and for the relief of other conditions, such as migraine or fibromyalgia. However, the results are inconclusive because studies to date have involved small study populations and short intervention periods.

In the United States, DAO supplements are available over the counter but are not FDA-approved.

In Europe, two investigations, financially backed by the manufacturer of the oral DAO supplementation, have posited that DAO supplementation could alleviate patient symptoms. The first study sought to "objectify and quantify histamine-associated symptoms and to analyze whether oral administration of the histamine-degrading enzyme DAO caused a reduction of symptoms". In this study, neither major nor minor symptoms could be replicated in 39 patients who initially responded to an open challenge with 75 mg histamine in peppermint tea, using a double-blind, placebo-controlled challenge. Consequently, the primary endpoint of the study was not achieved, and the basis for the authors' conclusion that DAO supplementation intake resulted in a "statistically significant reduction in symptoms" remains unclear. The second study was purely observational, lacking a control group: it compared symptomatology with and without DAO use in 28 patients. The chosen design was not suitable to demonstrate causal effects and carried a high risk of attributing placebo effects. The effectiveness of DAO supplementation has not been scientifically validated and is not recommended by the medical associations in Germany, Austria and Switzerland.

== Research directions ==
DAO may be linked to migraine under some conditions. During migraine episodes, there may be an elevation in the plasma concentrations of calcitonin gene-related peptide (CGRP) and histamine. Individuals with genetic variants in the DAO gene often experience migraines when consuming a diet high in histamine.
