= C5H6N2O2 =

The molecular formula C_{5}H_{6}N_{2}O_{2} (molar mass: 126.115 g/mol) may refer to:

- Thymine, one of the four nucleotide bases in DNA
- Imidazoleacetic acid, endogenous metabolite of the neurotransmitter histamine
