= Histamine intolerance =

Presumed set of adverse reactions

Histamine intolerance is a presumed set of adverse reactions (such as flushing, itching, rhinitis, etc.) to ingested histamine in food. The mainstream theory accepts that there may exist adverse reactions to ingested histamine, but does not recognize histamine intolerance as a separate medical condition that can be diagnosed.

Some believe that ingested histamine in persons with deficiencies in the enzymes that metabolize histamine may be responsible for various non-specific health complaints, which some individuals categorize as histamine intolerance. However, histamine intolerance is not recognized as a diagnosable condition in the International Classification of Diseases, 11th Revision (ICD-11). The scientific evidence of a direct causal relationship between ingested histamine and reproducible symptoms is currently limited and inconsistent.

Histamine intolerance reportedly affects a variable portion of the population, with estimates on about 1%, though exact prevalence is unclear due to diagnostic challenges. Current research focuses on better understanding the condition's possible etiology (causes), improving diagnostic methods, and developing effective treatments. Guidelines for management primarily focused on dietary adjustments and lifestyle modifications. However, histamine intolerance remains a controversial and under-researched condition in the medical community.

== Signs and symptoms ==
The manifestations of histamine intolerance are usually systemic, affecting the entire body; still, these symptoms are often sporadic and non-specific. The onset of symptoms is usually shortly (within a few hours) after specific food or drink consumption, and subsequent remission usually happens in 4-8 weeks of dieting, that is excluding food that causes the onset of symptoms.

Symptoms attributed to histamine intolerance are wide-ranging and may affect various physiological systems, including the skin (flushing or redness of the face, hives, itchiness, rash, etc.), gastrointestinal (gut discomfort, stomach pain, irritable bowel, abdominal distension, postprandial fullness, diarrhea or constipation, etc.), cardiovascular (reduced or raised blood pressure or abnormal heart rhythm, etc.), respiratory (asthma, runny nose, sinusitis, etc.), and nervous systems (headaches, migraine, sleep disturbances, cognitive impairment, mood disorders, dizziness or lightheadedness, muscle or eyelid twitching and other neurological symptoms). These symptoms are not specific to histamine intolerance and may overlap with other conditions or disorders.

== Causes ==
Histamine, a biogenic amine found in various food products, is frequently implicated as a potential instigator of a range of health issues. These issues are often collectively referred to under the umbrella term "histamine intolerance", formulated drawing parallels to "lactose intolerance", a condition resulting from lactase enzyme deficiency. Nevertheless, there are no prospective, controlled studies that would have conclusively established an enzyme or a lack thereof as the root cause of adverse reactions following histamine ingestion.

Some scholars suspect that histamine intolerance is a condition characterized by an imbalance between histamine intake through the diet and the body's ability to metabolize ingested histamine so that this imbalance leads to increased blood histamine concentration, which can cause adverse effects. Histamine intolerance is considered by these scholars a non-immunological disorder that results from reduced activity or levels of the enzymes that metabolize histamine: diamine oxidase (DAO) and histamine N-methyltransferase (HNMT). Still, the exact prevalence of histamine intolerance is unknown due to limited data and a lack of validated diagnostic methods.

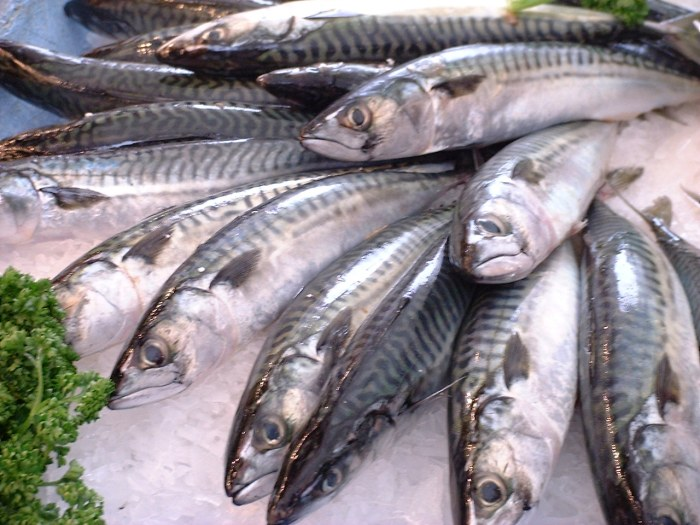
Atlantic mackerel, a species of fish belonging to Scombridae family, a family of species which if stored improperly, can spoil and upon consumption can cause scombroid fish seafood poisoning, a medical condition

Despite this common attribution of various symptoms as adverse reactions to ingested histamine, the scientific substantiation for a direct link between the ingestion of histamine and the manifestation of clear reproducible symptoms remains inconsistent. A small number of studies have attempted to test this relationship through the rigorous methodology of double-blind, placebo-controlled oral food challenges involving histamine. However, the results yielded from these investigations have been mixed and heterogeneous, further complicating the interpretation of the data and comparison of results of these studies. Despite the lack of robust, consistent evidence, the consumption of histamine continues to be suspected as the etiological agent (factor that causes the onset) behind a variety of nonspecific health complaints.

The scientific support for such a clinical picture—the combination of symptoms, signs, and other medical information, associated with histamine ingestion—remains limited and presents contradictory findings: for example, histamine present in dietary sources such as Emmental cheese is tolerated better compared to histamine derived from spoiled fish, particularly those belonging to the Scombridae family, which includes species like tuna and mackerel. The adverse physiological responses associated with the consumption of such spoiled fish are typically a result of histamine toxicity rather than intolerance to histamine per se. This response caused by spoiled fish suggests that the intake of abnormally high concentrations of histamine would elicit a reaction in any individual, irrespective of their sensitivity to histamine. It is not clear whether the symptoms observed in cases of fish poisoning can be attributed solely to the histamine content of the spoiled fish, or if other factors may also be involved.

Histamine can bind to four types of receptors (H_{1}–H_{4}) and trigger various physiological responses. The physiological responses that histamine can trigger depend on which type of receptor it binds to. For example, H_{1} receptors are involved in allergic reactions, inflammation, and sensory perception: they can cause smooth muscle contraction (leading to manifestations such as bronchoconstriction or intestinal cramping), increased vascular permeability (resulting in edema), and stimulation of sensory nerve endings (causing itching and pain). Histamine levels in the blood and inside the cells are normally regulated by two enzymes: diamine oxidase (DAO) and histamine N-methyltransferase (HNMT).

In some cases, circulating histamine levels can rise and cause adverse effects. According to some authors, such cases can be caused by two main reasons: histamine intoxication and histamine intolerance.

Histamine intoxication is a condition that occurs when healthy individuals consume foods that contain high amounts of histamine, such as spoiled fish. In histamine intoxication, the ingested histamine can overwhelm the capacity of the histamine-degrading enzymes and lead to symptoms such as flushing (redness of the face), headache, nausea, diarrhea, hypotension (low blood pressure), and arrhythmia. The diagnosis of histamine intoxication is based on the clinical presentation and the history of food intake. The treatment consists of antihistamines, fluids, and supportive measures.

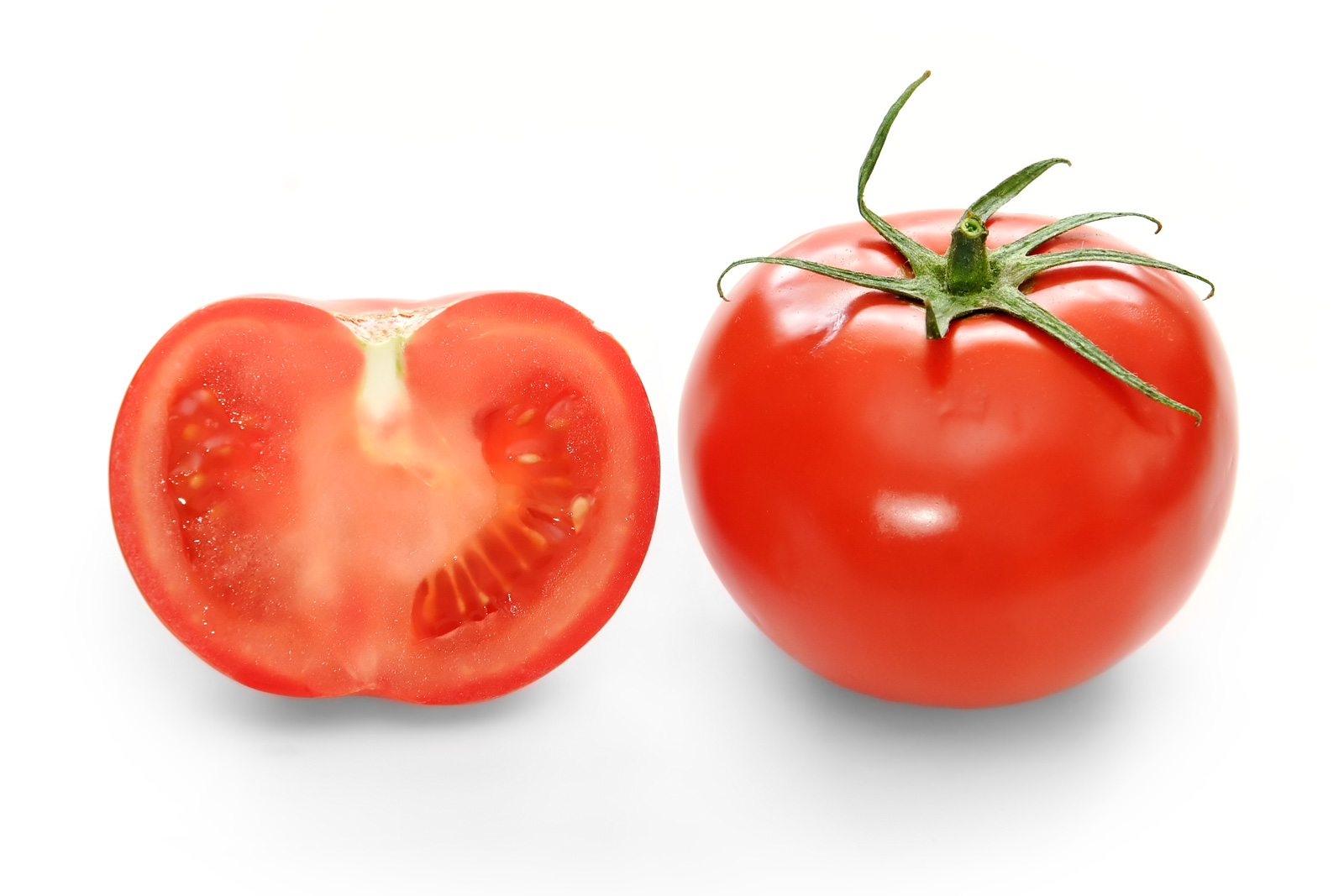
Certain plants, such as tomatoes, naturally contain histamine.

Histamine intolerance, in contrast to histamine intoxication, is a presumed disorder that affects individuals who are supposed to have a reduced or impaired activity of the histamine-degrading enzymes, either due to genetic factors, medications, or gastrointestinal diseases. In healthy individuals, the consumption of small amounts of histamine typically does not have any adverse health effects. However, in supposedly affected individuals, ingesting histamine through food at levels well below those associated with scombroid poisoning (from eating spoiled fish) can lead to symptoms related to histamine intolerance. In the ICD-11, there is a condition "XM74Y6 Scombroid fish seafood poison", but not "histamine intolerance". In the supposed histamine intolerance, these affected individuals supposedly have a lower threshold for histamine and can develop symptoms even after consuming foods with normal or moderate amounts of histamine, such as tomatoes, eggplants, spinach, strawberries—plants which naturally contain histamine—or wine. The symptoms of alleged histamine intolerance are similar to those of histamine intoxication, but they can also include chronic conditions such as urticaria (hives), asthma, rhinitis, or migraine. Some scholars believe that the diagnosis of histamine intolerance is challenging and requires the exclusion of other causes of histamine-related symptoms, as well as a positive response to a low-histamine diet, and the treatment of histamine intolerance, involves avoiding histamine-rich foods. Still, there are currently no measurable indicators that can confirm the occurrence of adverse reactions due to the ingestion of histamine.

The exact causes of histamine intolerance are not fully understood, but they can be multifactorial. One of the factors believed to cause histamine intolerance is an imbalance between uptake of histamine through the diet and a diminished capacity to metabolize ingested histamine, leading to an increased blood concentration of the amines which may potentially cause adverse effects.

The primary cause of histamine intolerance is considered by several authors to be insufficient activity or reduced levels of the enzyme diamine oxidase (DAO), which normally metabolizes histamine in the intestine. Dietary histamine enters the body through the intestinal epithelium. While histamine N-methyltransferase (HNMT), another enzyme that metabolize histamine, is also present in the gastrointestinal tract, DAO is more abundantly expressed in the tract and primarily protects against exogenous histamine from food or gut microbiota. Therefore, the role of HNMT is of lesser significance for breaking ingested histamine. Animal studies using DAO inhibitors have shown its protective role against ingested histamine with food. Other probable factors that may contribute to histamine intolerance include endogenous overproduction of histamine due to allergies or mastocytosis, genetic inheritance resulting in reduced DAO activity or effectiveness, pathological factors such as intestinal diseases affecting DAO production or function, pharmacological factors like medications inhibiting DAO activity, and alterations in gut microbiota leading to increased levels of bacteria secreting biogenic amines, including histamine. It has been established that certain bacteria within the gut microbiota, such as lactobacilli, have the ability to produce substantial amounts of histamine—the recognition of histamine as a significant metabolite of these intestinal bacteria raises doubts about the reliability of diagnostic stool analysis.

== Mechanism ==
Biological inactivation (breakdown) of histamine by the histamine N-methyltransferase (HNMT) enzyme into N^{τ}-methylhistamine, a chemical reaction denoted by straight arrow—if this process if affected, histamine intolerance may develop, as believed by some scholars

The exact mechanism that lies behind histamine intolerance is not known. Some scholars suspect that the pathogenesis (the process of disorder development) of histamine intolerance involves an imbalance between uptake of histamine and other amines through the diet and a diminished capacity to metabolize those amines and that this imbalance can be due to insufficient activity or levels of the enzymes diamine oxidase (DAO) and histamine N-methyltransferase (HNMT), which are responsible for breaking down histamine. While deficiencies in DAO are considered by these scholars to be the primary cause of histamine intolerance, variations in both DAO and HNMT genes could play a role in its development. The combined activity of these two enzymes determines how effectively histamine is broken down and cleared from the body. Still, a definitive causal relationship between adverse reactions following histamine ingestion and a compromised histamine catabolism due to a deficiency in DAO or HNMT is still lacking.

Several authors suspect that the imbalance in histamine intolerance is between the consumption, biosynthesis and selective release of histamine from certain granulocytes (i.e., mast cells and basophils), versus the breakdown of histamine by the enzymes which metabolize it, such as DAO and HNMT. These scholars suspect that in contrast to histamine intolerance, allergic reactions involving an immediate allergic response to an allergen are caused by anaphylactic degranulation, which is the abrupt and explosive release of "pre-formed mediators", including histamine and tryptase, from mast cells and basophils throughout the body.

Despite the belief shared by several researchers that consuming histamine can lead to nonspecific health issues, the scientific proof to back this claim is both scarce and inconsistent, the underlying mechanisms are not understood and while several factors have been proposed for explaining the underlying mechanisms of these adverse reactions to histamine intake, no single hypothesis has gained solid scientific confirmation.

== Diagnosis ==
The term "Histamine intolerance" does not appear in the 11th edition of the International Classification of Diseases (ICD). The diagnosis of histamine intolerance is challenging due to its nonspecific symptoms and lack of validated diagnostic tools. Medical associations in Germany and Switzerland, beginning in 2017, and Austria, starting in 2021, have posited that the evidence supporting a causal relationship between adverse reactions to dietary histamine and a compromised histamine catabolism resulting from a deficiency in diamine oxidase (DAO) remains insufficient. These associations advise against the use of the term "histamine intolerance" and instead advocate for the more accurate descriptor, "adverse reactions to ingested histamine", to better reflect the current understanding of the condition—this change in terminology reflects the limited understanding of the precise causes and mechanisms underlying these adverse reactions.

In the 2017 German guideline for the management of adverse reactions to ingested histamine, the following categories from ICD-10 are indicated adverse reactions to ingested histamine:

- T78 Adverse effects, not elsewhere classified;
- T61 Toxic effect of noxious substances eaten as seafood;
- K90.4 Other malabsorption due to intolerance.

There are no specific tests that can definitively diagnose histamine intolerance. An approach through a thorough evaluation of clinical symptoms and their improvement or resolution after following a low-histamine diet lacks solid evidence. The few studies that have been conducted are observational, including three on chronic spontaneous urticaria. These studies do not allow for the cause-and-effect conclusions to be drawn. Additionally, no randomized controlled trials have been conducted to confirm or refute the effectiveness of a low-histamine diet. Some authors suggest a complex approach, that includes assessments to rule out other potential causes of similar symptoms, such as allergies, mastocytosis, gastrointestinal diseases, and medication-induced inhibition of diamine oxidase (DAO) enzyme activity. These authors also recommend genetic testing for single-nucleotide polymorphisms (SNPs) in genes related to DAO function, to provide supportive evidence for the diagnosis; still, such cannot confirm the diagnosis on its own. Other complementary tests have been proposed by these authors. Still, these tests require further validation before being widely accepted as diagnostic tools for histamine intolerance. Examples of such tests are measuring plasma DAO activity levels and conducting intradermal skin allergy tests with histamine.

While several factors have been proposed for diagnosing adverse reactions to histamine intake, there are still no reliable lab tests to either confirm or refute the diagnosis. Figuring out adverse reactions to ingested histamine typically involves a thorough analysis of dietary habits and history of the person, taking into account clinical manifestations associated with the ingestion of high-histamine foods as well as the response to dietary changes such as low-histamine diets.

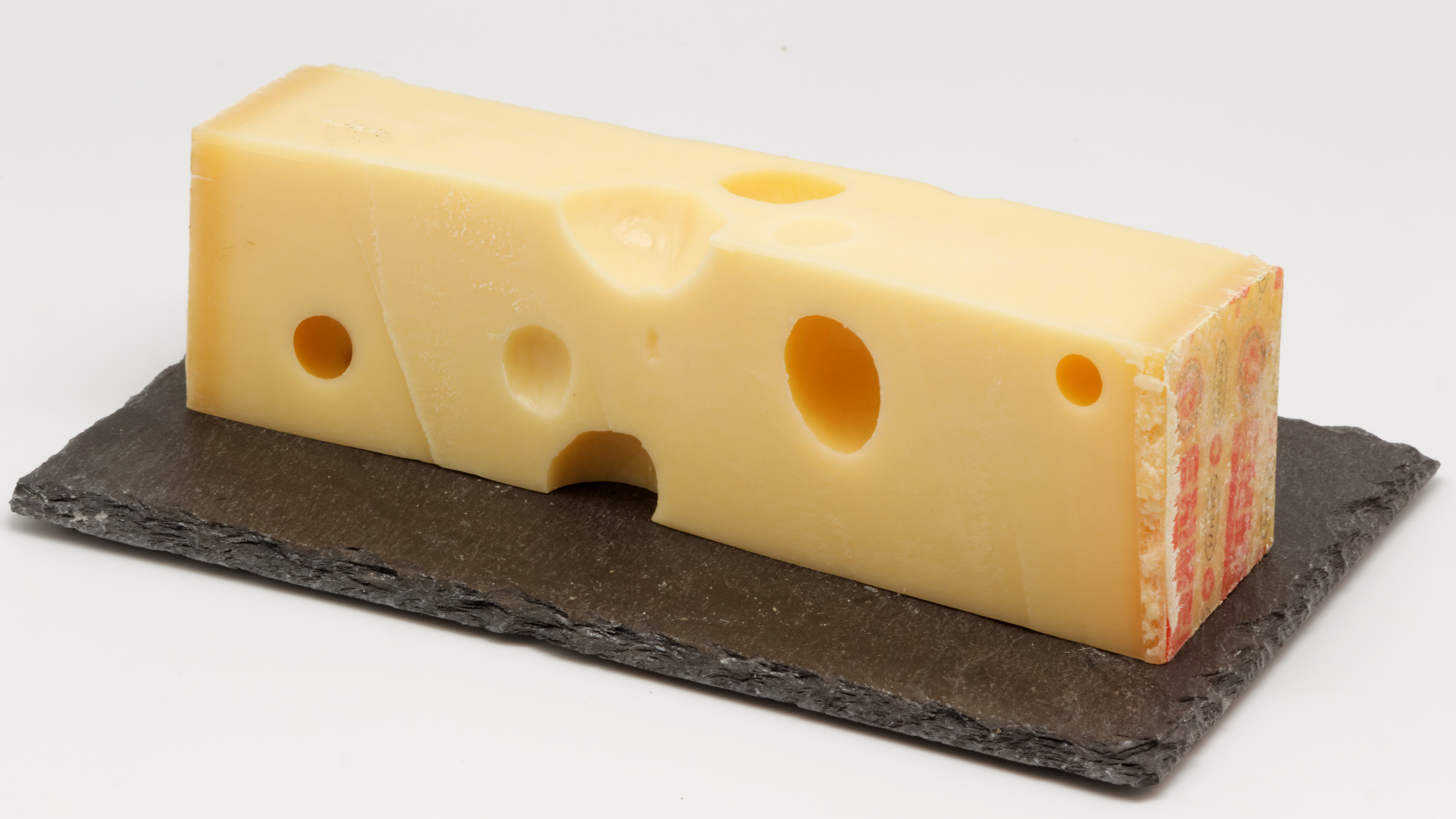
Histamine content in Emmental cheese (depicted) can range from less than 0.1 mg/kg to as high as 2000 mg/kg—this variability makes it challenging to accurately estimate the histamine content of individual meals

The concentration of histamine in various food items can exhibit significant variability, influenced by factors such as the maturity of the food, the duration of storage, hygienic measures, and the processing techniques employed. As a result, even within a single type of food product, there can be substantial differences in histamine levels. For instance, the histamine content in Emmental cheese can range from less than 0.1 mg/kg to as high as 2,000 mg/kg, while in smoked mackerel, it can vary from less than 0.1 mg/kg to up to 1,788 mg/kg. Red wine intolerance is often associated with histamine intolerance, but some red wines contain very little histamine. A study on 100 types of Austrian red wine from the 2004 vintage showed significantly varying histamine levels. This variability makes it challenging to accurately estimate the histamine content of individual meals or drinks. Observations suggest that the tolerance to histamine can differ depending on the food matrix, and provocations with orally administered histamine have not been consistently reproducible, which raises questions about the feasibility and validity of a quantitative classification of foods based on their histamine content. There is a great heterogeneity in the type of foods that are advised against for histamine intolerant individuals, and a review found that exclusion of 32% of foods could be explained by the occurrence of high contents of histamine, while there was a range of excluded foods with an absence or very low levels of biogenic amines including histamine. Some dietary recommendations that have been proposed are not backed by robust scientific evidence. For example, certain foods that do not contain significant amounts of histamine (e.g., yeast) are sometimes prohibited, while others are avoided due to their potential role as "histamine liberators"—pharmacologically active substances purported to induce histamine release from human mast cells or basophils, still, there is currently no reliable evidence supporting the existence of such "histamine liberators" in foods, nor their clinical significance in adverse reactions to food or food ingredients. The existence and clinical significance of these so-called "histamine liberators" in foods is a topic of ongoing debate in the scientific community. Despite anecdotal reports and some theoretical discussions, there is currently no robust scientific evidence to support the notion that certain foods can act as histamine liberators. Whereas the concept of "histamine liberators" is frequently mentioned in discussions about histamine intolerance and dietary management, scientific evidence supporting their existence and clinical relevance is currently limited and inconsistent.

Some authors suggest that the diagnosis of histamine intolerance can be established by medical history taking and the determination of histamine concentration in blood and DAO activity before and after a 14-day histamine-free diet. Other authors, although they believe that DAO activity determination offers additional diagnostic utility for histamine intolerance, supplementing clinical evaluation and assessment, they caution against the sole reliance on DAO activity measurements. Such measurements may not sufficiently establish the supposed diagnosis due to the limited correlation between the resulting serum DAO activity and the supposed condition. These scholars believe that reduction of symptoms typical for histamine intolerance—such as symptoms of irritable bowel syndrome (IBS)—after adherence to a histamine-reduced diet supports the diagnosis of histamine intolerance. They also suppose that to diagnose histamine intolerance, a careful and systematic analysis of the medical history is needed that focuses on symptoms specifically related to histamine and their association with food intake. Some scholars recommend using a questionnaire that encompasses symptoms associated with the four histamine receptors as a diagnostic tool. The proposed questionnaire includes categories such as gastrointestinal, cardiovascular, respiratory, and skin symptoms. The diagnostic value of such a questionnaire is challenged by other scholars.

The differential diagnosis of histamine intolerance aims to distinguish it from other conditions with similar symptoms, particularly gastrointestinal symptoms such as upper abdominal pain, flatulence, bloating, spasms, and diarrhea. Genuine food allergies typically occur in early childhood and resolve by the time a child enters primary school. In rare cases, genuine food allergies are still found in adults. Cross-reactions between pollen and food are also observed in adults. Nonallergic reactions are known as intolerances. The differential diagnosis of histamine intolerance aims to differentiate it from other types of food intolerances, such as fructose malabsorption, sorbitol malabsorption, and lactose intolerance. Fructose intolerance testing and lactose intolerance testing are diagnosed using the established procedure of hydrogen breath testing when the person with food intolerance has a hydrogen gas-producing intestinal flora. The histamine intolerance is differentiating from allergy and other intolerances by performing allergy tests for food (including prick tests and prick-prick tests with fresh food), tests for inhaled cross-reacting pollen, and tests for fructose intolerance and lactose intolerance.

As of 2025, despite extensive research, there are no definitive, objective measures or indicators that can conclusively validate the occurrence of adverse reactions due to the consumption of histamine that will allow to classify histamine intolerance as an identifiable medical condition.

== Treatment ==
Currently, a low-histamine diet is recommended by some scholars as the primary approach for managing symptoms of histamine intolerance. These scholars also recommend avoiding DAO-blocking medications and substances that may increase histamine levels, such as alcohol and certain food additives. Several medications, including acetylcysteine, metamizole, verapamil, metronidazole, and metoclopramide, have been reported to inhibit the activity of DAO or HNMT enzymes. However, these reports about the enzymatic inhibition were not confirmed by reliable studies.

Additional options in managing histamine intolerance include antihistamines, mast cell stabilizers, and supplementation with exogenous DAO, in the form of capsules or tablets. Howerver, there is no solid research to validate the effectiveness of these additional treatment options in histamine intolerance.

Two investigations, financially backed by the manufacturer of the oral DAO supplementation, have posited that DAO supplementation could alleviate the symptoms of histamine intolerance. The first study sought to "objectify and quantify histamine-associated symptoms and to analyze whether oral administration of the histamine-degrading enzyme DAO caused a reduction of symptoms". In this study, neither major nor minor symptoms could be replicated in 39 individuals who initially responded to an open challenge with 75 mg histamine in peppermint tea, using a double-blind, placebo-controlled challenge. Consequently, the primary endpoint of the study was not achieved, and the basis for the authors' conclusion that DAO supplementation intake resulted in a "statistically significant reduction in symptoms" remains unclear. The second study was purely observational, lacking a control group: it compared symptomatology with and without DAO use in 28 individuals. The chosen design was not suitable to demonstrate causal effects and carried a high risk of attributing placebo effects. The effectiveness of DAO supplementation has not been scientifically validated and is not recommended by the medical associations in Germany, Austria and Switzerland.

== Epidemiology ==
The potential prevalence of histamine intolerance is unknown due to limited data and a lack of validated diagnostic methods. A prevalence of up to 1-3% of the population has been proposed, but this has never been scientifically substantiated. Because reported histamine intolerance symptoms can mimic those seen in other conditions, such as food allergies or intolerance to sulfites, there is often difficulty in differentiating the causal agent responsible for adverse reactions. Two enzymes, diamine oxidase (DAO) and Histamine N-methyltransferase (HNMT) can metabolize histamine, and therefore may offer some protection against the absorption of dietary histamine. However, there is limited evidence from double-blind placebo-controlled provocations studies on adverse reactions to histamine-containing foods or other agents associated with histamine intolerance. Therefore, solid data focused on establishing pathophysiology, clinical presentation, and vaildated diagnostic tools are needed before reliable estimates can be made regarding epidemiological aspects of histamine intolerance.

== Research directions ==
During episodes of migraines, there is a marked increase in the plasma concentrations of calcitonin gene-related peptide (CGRP) and histamine. These two substances are known for their strong vasodilatory properties, that is, widening the blood vessels. Additionally, they have been observed to mutually stimulate each other's release within the trigeminovascular system. These properties could potentially contribute to the onset of migraines. Individuals with genetic variants in the AOC1 gene encoding the diamine oxidase (DAO) enzyme are observed to experience migraines when consuming a diet high in histamine. This observation suggests that ingested histamine could potentially aggravate migraines in persons who have a deficiency in histamine degradation due to variants in AOC1. How exogenous histamine and CGRP act on each other may explain the mechanisms underlying diet-induced migraines, and that question is still under study.

== Society and culture ==
The term "histamine intolerance" gained visibility through personal experiences shared by public figures. For example, in a 2023 publication in Miami Herald, former Olympic gymnast McKayla Maroney publicly shared her struggle with what she called "histamine intolerance".

== See also ==
- Food intolerance
- Red wine headache
