= L-amino-acid dehydrogenase =

Identifiers
- EC no.: 1.4.1.5
- CAS no.: 9029-13-4

Databases
- BRENDA: enzyme data
- ExPASy: NiceZyme view
- KEGG: enzyme entry
- MetaCyc: metabolic pathway
- Rhea: reactions
- PDB structures: RCSB PDB PDBe PDBsum
- Gene Ontology: AmiGO / QuickGO
Search
- PMC: articles
- PubMed: articles
- NCBI: proteins

In enzymology, a L-amino-acid dehydrogenase (EC 1.4.1.5) is an enzyme that catalyzes the chemical reaction

an L-amino acid + H_{2}O + NAD^{+} ⇌ a 2-oxo acid + NH_{3} + NADH + H^{+}

The 3 substrates of this enzyme are L-amino acid, H_{2}O, and NAD^{+}, whereas its 4 products are 2-oxo acid, NH_{3}, NADH, and H^{+}.

This enzyme belongs to the family of oxidoreductases, specifically those acting on the CH-NH_{2} group of donors with NAD^{+} or NADP^{+} as acceptor. The systematic name of this enzyme class is L-amino-acid:NAD+ oxidoreductase (deaminating).

== See also ==
- Amino acid
- Dehydrogenase
- Oxidoreductase
- Enzyme
- Nicotinamide adenine dinucleotide
- Transaminase
- Oxidative deamination
