= SKF-91488 =

Names
- Preferred IUPAC name 4-(Dimethylamino)butyl carbamimidothioate

Identifiers
CAS Number	68643-23-2
3D model (JSmol)	Interactive image
ChEMBL	ChEMBL1230270
ChemSpider	5037
DrugBank	DB07106
PubChem CID	5227
UNII	1I4LVX494H
CompTox Dashboard (EPA)	DTXSID50988329
- InChI: InChI=1S/C7H17N3S/c1-10(2)5-3-4-6-11-7(8)9/h3-6H2,1-2H3,(H3,8,9) Key: UFYJLJINUGVUHO-UHFFFAOYSA-N
- SMILES: [H]/N=C(/N)\SCCCCN(C)C

Properties
Chemical formula	C_{7}H_{17}N_{3}S
Molar mass	175.29 g·mol^{−1}
- Except where otherwise noted, data are given for materials in their standard state (at 25 °C [77 °F], 100 kPa). Infobox references

SKF-91488 is a histamine N-methyltransferase inhibitor. It prevents the degradation of histamine, leading to increased histamine levels.

== See also ==
- α-Fluoromethylhistidine
- Histidine methyl ester
