= Dimaprit =

Names
- Preferred IUPAC name 3-(Dimethylamino)propyl carbamimidothioate
- Other names 3-dimethylaminopropyl sulfanylmethanimidamide

Identifiers
CAS Number	65119-89-3
3D model (JSmol)	Interactive image
ChEMBL	ChEMBL12344
ChemSpider	2968
IUPHAR/BPS	1248
KEGG	C17930
PubChem CID	3077
UNII	ZZQ699148P
CompTox Dashboard (EPA)	DTXSID0037154
- InChI: InChI=1S/C6H15N3S/c1-9(2)4-3-5-10-6(7)8/h3-5H2,1-2H3,(H3,7,8) Key: OLHQOJYVQUNWPL-UHFFFAOYSA-N; InChI=1/C6H15N3S/c1-9(2)4-3-5-10-6(7)8/h3-5H2,1-2H3,(H3,7,8) Key: OLHQOJYVQUNWPL-UHFFFAOYAQ
- SMILES: CN(C)CCCSC(=N)N

Properties
Chemical formula	C_{6}H_{15}N_{3}S
Molar mass	161.2684 g/mol
- Except where otherwise noted, data are given for materials in their standard state (at 25 °C [77 °F], 100 kPa). verify (what is ?) Infobox references

Dimaprit is a histamine analog working as a selective H_{2} histamine receptor agonist.
