= 1-Methylhistamine =

Names
- Preferred IUPAC name 2-(1-Methyl-1H-imidazol-4-yl)ethan-1-amine

Identifiers
CAS Number	501-75-7
3D model (JSmol)	Interactive image
Beilstein Reference	110757
ChEBI	CHEBI:29009
ChEMBL	ChEMBL507
ChemSpider	3488
Gmelin Reference	2906
KEGG	C05127
PubChem CID	3614
UNII	KCB81T4EOF
CompTox Dashboard (EPA)	DTXSID30198207
- InChI: InChI=1S/C6H11N3/c1-9-4-6(2-3-7)8-5-9/h4-5H,2-3,7H2,1H3 Key: FHQDWPCFSJMNCT-UHFFFAOYSA-N
- SMILES: CN1C=C(N=C1)CCN

Properties
Chemical formula	C_{6}H_{11}N_{3}
Molar mass	125.175 g·mol^{−1}

Hazards
- GHS labelling
Pictograms	(GHS05: Corrosive) (GHS07: Exclamation mark) (GHS08: Health hazard)
Signal word	Danger
Hazard statements	H314, H317, H334, H335
Precautionary statements	P233, P260, P264, P271, P272, P280, P284, P301+P330+P331, P302+P352, P302+P361+P354, P304+P340, P305+P354+P338, P316, P319, P321, P333+P317, P342+P316, P362+P364, P363, P403, P403+P233, P405, P501
- Except where otherwise noted, data are given for materials in their standard state (at 25 °C [77 °F], 100 kPa). Infobox references

1-Methylhistamine (also known as N^{τ}-methylhistamine (NMH)) is a metabolite of histamine.

== Background ==
NMH is formed by N^{τ}-methylation of histamine, catalyzed by the enzyme Histamine N-methyltransferase.

NMH is excreted in the urine and can be measured as a biomarker of histamine activity. While NMH has some biological activity on its own, it is much weaker than histamine. It can bind to histamine receptors, still, NMH has a lower affinity and efficacy than histamine for these receptors, meaning that it binds less strongly and activates them less effectively. Depending on the receptor subtype and the tissue context, NMH may act as a partial agonist or an antagonist for some histamine receptors. NMH may have some modulatory effects on histamine signalling, but it is unlikely to cause significant allergic or inflammatory reactions by itself. NMH may also serve as a feedback mechanism to regulate histamine levels and prevent excessive histamine release.

In clinical settings, urinary NMH can be measured when systemic mastocytosis is suspected. Systemic mastocytosis and anaphylaxis are typically associated with at least a two-fold increase in urinary NMH levels, which are also increased in patients taking monoamine oxidase inhibitors and in patients on histamine-rich diets.

== See also ==
- Imidazoleacetic acid
