= Catabolism =

Set of metabolic pathways that breaks down molecules into smaller units

Schematic breakdown of large biomolecules to release energy for fueling the cell metabolism by producing ATP, the energy currency of the cell

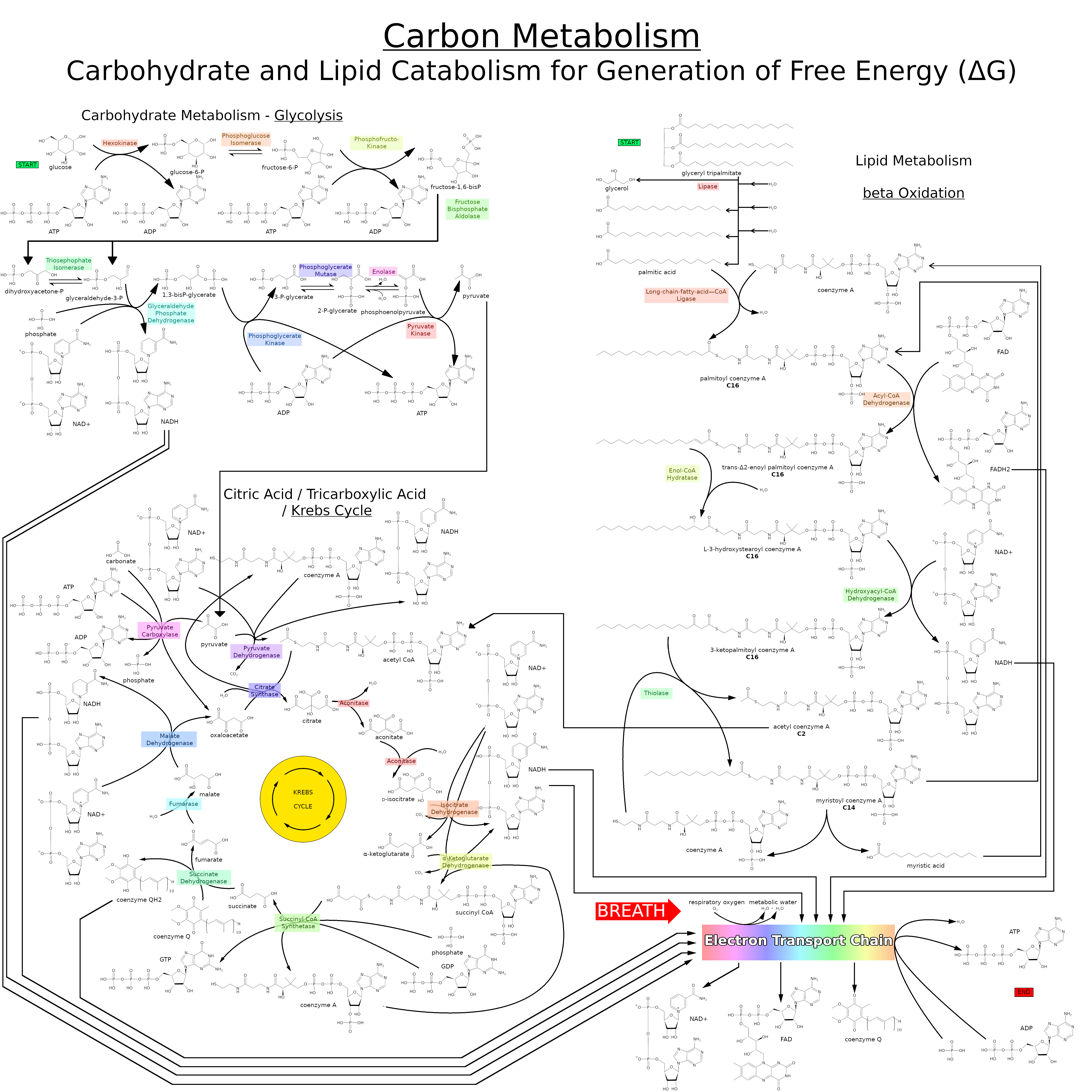
Carbon Catabolism pathway map for free energy including carbohydrate and lipid sources of energy

Catabolism (/kəˈtæbəlɪzəm/) is the set of metabolic pathways that breaks down molecules into smaller units that are either oxidized to release energy or used in other anabolic reactions. Catabolism breaks down large molecules (such as polysaccharides, lipids, nucleic acids, and proteins) into smaller units (such as monosaccharides, fatty acids, nucleotides, and amino acids, respectively). Catabolism is the breaking-down aspect of metabolism, whereas anabolism is the building-up aspect.

Cells use the monomers released from breaking down polymers to either construct new polymer molecules or degrade the monomers further to simple waste products, releasing energy. Cellular wastes include lactic acid, acetic acid, carbon dioxide, ammonia, and urea. The formation of these wastes is usually an oxidation process involving a release of chemical free energy, some of which is lost as heat, but the rest of which is used to drive the synthesis of adenosine triphosphate (ATP). This molecule acts as a way for the cell to transfer the energy released by catabolism to the energy-requiring reactions that make up anabolism.

Catabolism is a destructive metabolism and anabolism is a constructive metabolism. Catabolism, therefore, provides the chemical energy necessary for the maintenance and growth of cells. Examples of catabolic processes include glycolysis, the citric acid cycle, the breakdown of muscle protein in order to use amino acids as substrates for gluconeogenesis, the breakdown of fat in adipose tissue to fatty acids, and oxidative deamination of neurotransmitters by monoamine oxidase.

== Catabolic hormones ==
There are many signals that control catabolism. Most of the known signals are hormones and the molecules involved in metabolism itself. Endocrinologists have traditionally classified many of the hormones as anabolic or catabolic, depending on which part of metabolism they stimulate. The so-called classic catabolic hormones known since the early 20th century are cortisol, glucagon, and adrenaline (and other catecholamines). In recent decades, many more hormones with at least some catabolic effects have been discovered, including cytokines, orexin (known as hypocretin), and melatonin.

| Hormone | Function |
|---|---|
| Cortisol | Released from the adrenal gland in response to stress; its main role is to increase blood glucose levels by gluconeogenesis. |
| Glucagon | Released from alpha cells in the pancreas either when starving or when the body needs to generate additional energy; it stimulates the breakdown of glycogen in the liver to increase blood glucose levels; its effect is the opposite of insulin; glucagon and insulin are a part of a negative-feedback system that stabilizes blood glucose levels. |
| Adrenaline | Released in response to the activation of the sympathetic nervous system; increases heart rate and heart contractility, constricts blood vessels, is a bronchodilator that opens (dilates) the bronchi of the lungs to increase air volume and oxygen supply in the lungs, and stimulates gluconeogenesis. |

== Etymology ==
The word catabolism is from Neo-Latin, which got the roots from Greek: κάτω kato, "downward" and βάλλειν ballein, "to throw".

== See also ==
- Autophagy
- Dehydration synthesis
- Hydrolysis
- Nocturnal post absorptive catabolism
- Psilacetin § Pharmacology
- Sarcopenia
