= PUM3 =

Protein-coding gene in the species Homo sapiens

Identifiers
- Aliases: PUM3, D19Bwg1357e, 1110069H02Rik, AA675048, Kiaa0020, HA-8, HLA-HA8, PEN, PUF-A, PUF6, XTP5, KIAA0020, pumilio RNA binding family member 3
- External IDs: OMIM: 609960; MGI: 106253; GeneCards: PUM3
Available structures
PDB	Ortholog search: PDBe RCSB
PDB	List of PDB id codes 4WZR, 4WZW

Gene location (Human)
Chr.	Chromosome 9 (human)
Band	9p24.2	Start	2,720,469 bp
Band	9p24.2	End	2,844,095 bp

Gene location (Mouse)
Chr.	Chromosome 19 (mouse)
Band	19 C1|19 21.96 cM	Start	27,366,098 bp
Band	19 C1|19 21.96 cM	End	27,407,225 bp
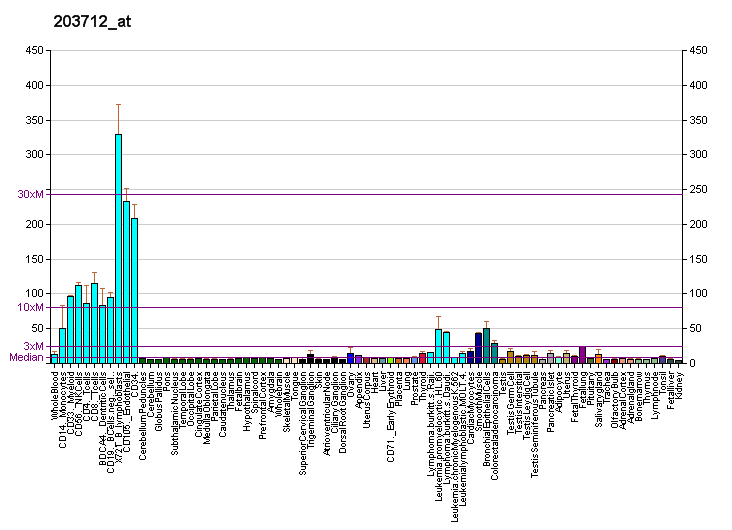
RNA expression pattern
Bgee	Human / Mouse (ortholog); Top expressed in: Achilles tendon; mucosa of transverse colon; mucosa of esophagus; gonad; testicle; olfactory zone of nasal mucosa; left ovary; minor salivary glands; body of pancreas; right ovary / Top expressed in: Paneth cell; renal corpuscle; endothelial cell of lymphatic vessel; epiblast; primitive streak; medullary collecting duct; internal carotid artery; ureter; abdominal wall; hair follicle; More reference expression data
BioGPS	More reference expression data
Gene ontology
Molecular function	DNA binding; protein binding; mRNA binding; RNA binding
Cellular component	endoplasmic reticulum; nucleus; nucleoplasm; nucleolus; chromosome
Biological process	regulation of protein ADP-ribosylation; regulation of translation
Sources:Amigo / QuickGO
Orthologs
Databases	NCBI: entry; OMA: entry
Species	Human	Mouse
Entrez	9933	52874
Ensembl	ENSG00000080608	ENSMUSG00000041360
UniProt	Q15397	Q8BKS9
RefSeq (mRNA)	NM_001031691; NM_014878	NM_177474
RefSeq (protein)	NP_055693	NP_803425
Location (UCSC)	Chr 9: 2.72 – 2.84 Mb	Chr 19: 27.37 – 27.41 Mb
PubMed search
- Wikidata
View/Edit Human	View/Edit Mouse

Pumilio RNA binding family member 3 (previously KIAA0020) is a protein that in humans is encoded by the PUM3 gene.
