= KNOP1 =

KNOP1 gene

Identifiers
- Aliases: KNOP1, 101F10.1, C16orf88, FAM191A, TSG118, lysine-rich nucleolar protein 1, lysine rich nucleolar protein 1
- External IDs: MGI: 1913606; GeneCards: KNOP1

Gene location (Mouse)
Chr.	Chromosome 7 (mouse)
Band	7|7 F2	Start	118,441,445 bp
Band	7|7 F2	End	118,455,477 bp
Orthologs
Databases	NCBI: entry; OMA: entry
Species	Human	Mouse
Entrez	400506	66356
Ensembl	ENSG00000103550	ENSMUSG00000030980
UniProt	Q1ED39	Q9Z2Q2
RefSeq (mRNA)	NM_001012991	NM_001168218; NM_001168219; NM_001168220; NM_023197
RefSeq (protein)	NP_001013009; NP_001335456; NP_001335457; NP_001335458; NP_001335459 NP_001335460; NP_001335461; NP_001335462; NP_001335463; NP_001335464; NP_001335465; NP_001335466	NP_001161690; NP_001161691; NP_001161692; NP_075686
Location (UCSC)	n/a	Chr 7: 118.44 – 118.46 Mb
PubMed search
- Wikidata
View/Edit Human	View/Edit Mouse

Lysine-rich nucleolar protein 1 (KNOP1) is a protein which in human's is encoded by the KNOP1 gene. Aliases for KNOP1 include TSG118, C16orf88, and FAM191A.

== Gene ==
KNOP1 is located on the negative DNA strand of chromosome 16 at 16p12.3. It spans 15.21 kb, from 19729556 to 19714347 and has 6 exons which are alternatively spliced in the RNA to create three main transcript isoforms. Two of the KNOP1 isoforms, B and C, lack exon 1, shifting the start codon used to the one found in exon 2, and so the proteins encoded by these lack sequence at N-terminus. Isoform C also does not contain exon 4, which encodes the C-terminal DUF5595 domain.

=== Gene Neighborhood ===
The genes surrounding KNOP1 are VPS35L which is upstream and IQCK which is downstream of KNOP1. The IQCK gene was identified to be a potential candidate for obsessive-compulsive disorder in a genome-wide association study. The VPS35L encodes the protein VPS35L that acts as a component of the retriever complex.

=== Gene Expression ===
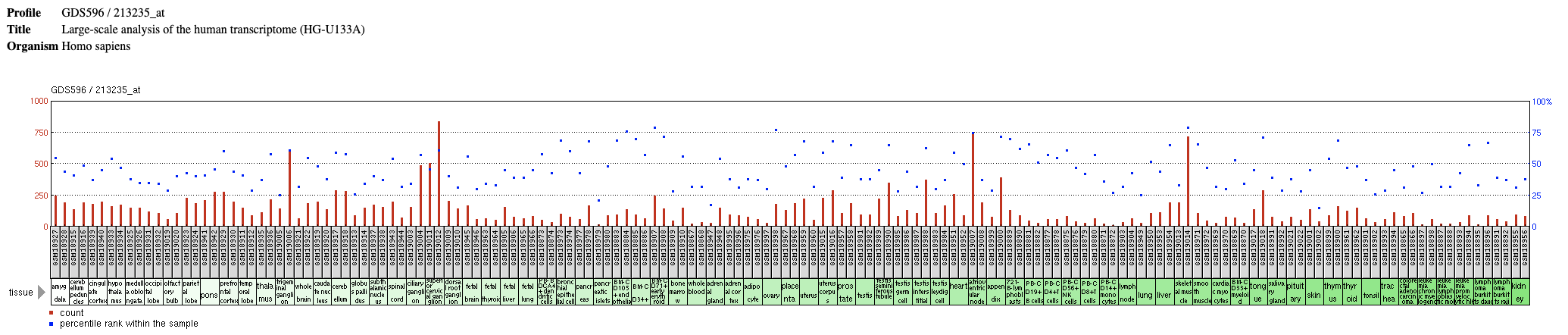
KNOP1 expression in Human tissues

KNOP1 has high levels of expression in the superior cervical ganglion, testis, placenta, and in early stages of hear and lung development. KNOP1 showed low levels of expression in the liver and pancreas.

== Species distribution ==
There are many orthologs of KNOP1 in many different species of animals but not in the other kingdoms. No paralogs of KNOP1 were found. Table 1 lists select KNOP1 orthologs.

Table 1: KNOP1 Orthologs
Genus, Species	Divergence from Homo sapiens (MYA)	NCBI accession number	Sequence length (AA) ! !Sequence similarity to Homo sapien KNOP1	
Homo sapiens	--	NP_001335456.1	518	100%
Pan paniscus	6	XP_034795825.1	604	85.1%
Mus musculus	89	NP_075686.2	532	65.8%
Lagenorhynchus obliquidens	94	XP_026953897.1	454	72.6%
Galemys pyrenaicus	94	KAG8513613.1	534	67.1%
Phyllostomus discolor	94	KAF6125017.1	434	64.3%
Monodelphis domestica	160	XP_016279153.1	601	47.1%
Ornithorhynchus anatinus	180	XP_028910011.1	544	47.2%
Tyto alba	318	XP_042654773.1	627	42.1%
Gallus gallus	318	XP_004945520.2	548	32.4%
Bufo bufo	352	XP_040296565.1	513	37.7%
Danio rerio	433	XP_687135.1	475	40.4%
Branchiostoma floridae	637	XP_035694713.1	666	34.2%
Owenia fusiformis	787	CAC9610945.1	553	34.7%

== Protein ==
The exact function of KNOP1 is not yet understood it is hypothesized to mimic nucleostemin, a nucleolar protein linked to the proliferation potential of stem cells. The protein is 518 amino acids long, Isoform B is 458 amino acids, and Isoform C is 435 amino acids. It has a molecular weight of 58 kdal and an isoelectric point of 9.92 The protein is rich in lysine and has a lysine-rich region from amino acid 123–355. There is a region of the protein that interacts with the protein ZNF106. Some papers have associated it with the surface of the condensed chromosomes.

=== Domains ===
Domains of KNOP1:The green box is domain DUF5595:The blue box is domain SMAP:The green line is region of interaction for ZNF106

KNOP1 has two domains Duf5595 (Not found in isoform C) and SMAP located at the end of the protein. DUF5595 is found in Nude C 80 (Ndc80) proteins which can be found in species such as Homo sapiens. Ndc80 protein complexes are a core component of the end-on attachment sites for kinetochore microtubules. SMAP (Small acidic protein family) is found in eukaryotes, and is approximately 70 amino acids in length. There is a single completely conserved residue G that may be functionally important at G441

KNOP1 Conceptual Translation

=== Interacting protein ===
KNOP1 has been shown to interact with ZNF106 and has been confirmed by Grasberger, H., & Bell, G. I. This study concluded that the rapid downregulation of KNOP1 expression during in vitro terminal differentiation coincides with a loss of nucleolar ZFP106.
