= Metoprine =

Organic compound (C11H10Cl2N4)

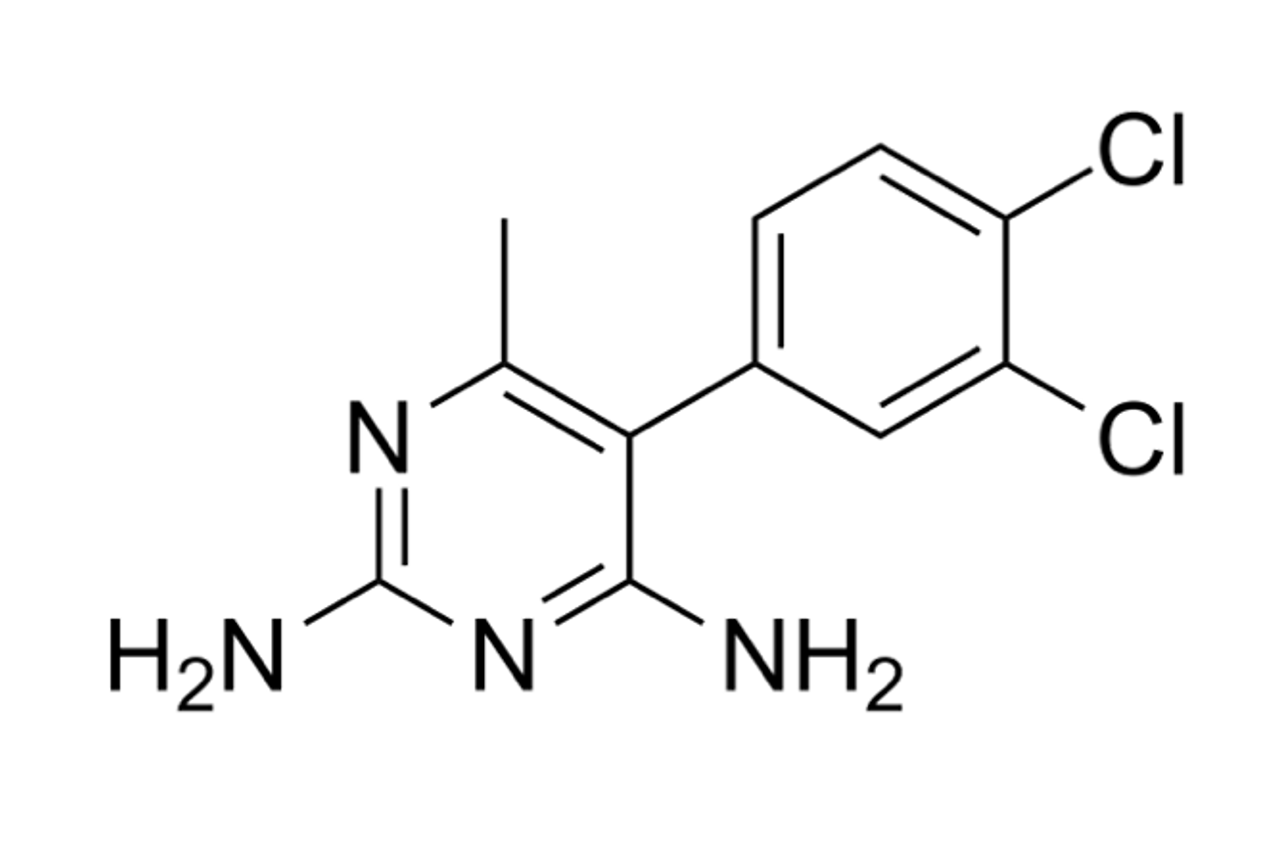

Names
- IUPAC name 5-(3,4-dichlorophenyl)-6-methylpyrimidine-2,4-diamine

Identifiers
CAS Number	7761-45-7
3D model (JSmol)	Interactive image
ChEMBL	ChEMBL264373
ChemSpider	22874
DrugBank	DB04655
KEGG	D00309
PubChem CID	24466
UNII	2L9RKX796Q
CompTox Dashboard (EPA)	DTXSID0057831
- InChI: InChI=1S/C11H10Cl2N4/c1-5-9(10(14)17-11(15)16-5)6-2-3-7(12)8(13)4-6/h2-4H,1H3,(H4,14,15,16,17) Key: VQJHOPSWBGJHQS-UHFFFAOYSA-N
- SMILES: CC1=C(C(=NC(=N1)N)N)C2=CC(=C(C=C2)Cl)Cl

Properties
Chemical formula	C_{11}H_{10}Cl_{2}N_{4}
Molar mass	269.13 g·mol^{−1}
- Except where otherwise noted, data are given for materials in their standard state (at 25 °C [77 °F], 100 kPa). Infobox references

Metoprine (2,4-diamino-5-(3′,4′-dichlorophenyl)-6-methylpyrimidine) is a dihydrofolate reductase (DHFR) inhibitor initially developed for potential applications in cancer treatment. Although it never achieved widespread clinical adoption, its properties have made it an important research tool in oncology, neurobiology, and parasitology. Other synonyms for metoprine include BW-197U, DDMP, Methodichlorophen, NSC-19494, NSC7364, and TCMDC-123931.

== History ==
Metoprine was developed in the 1970s as a lipid-soluble antifolate with improved cellular penetration compared to methotrexate (MTX), which requires carrier-mediated transport. Early studies demonstrated its efficacy in inhibiting tumor growth. However, its clinical use was limited due to its long half-life (~10 days in humans) and significant toxicity, including hematological, neurological, cutaneous, and gastrointestinal side effects.

Beyond its anticancer potential, metoprine was later discovered to inhibit histamine-N-methyltransferase (HNMT), an enzyme involved in histamine degradation. This led to its use as a research tool for studying histamine's role in neurological and immune functions. Additionally, its ability to disrupt folate metabolism made it a candidate for treating parasitic infections.

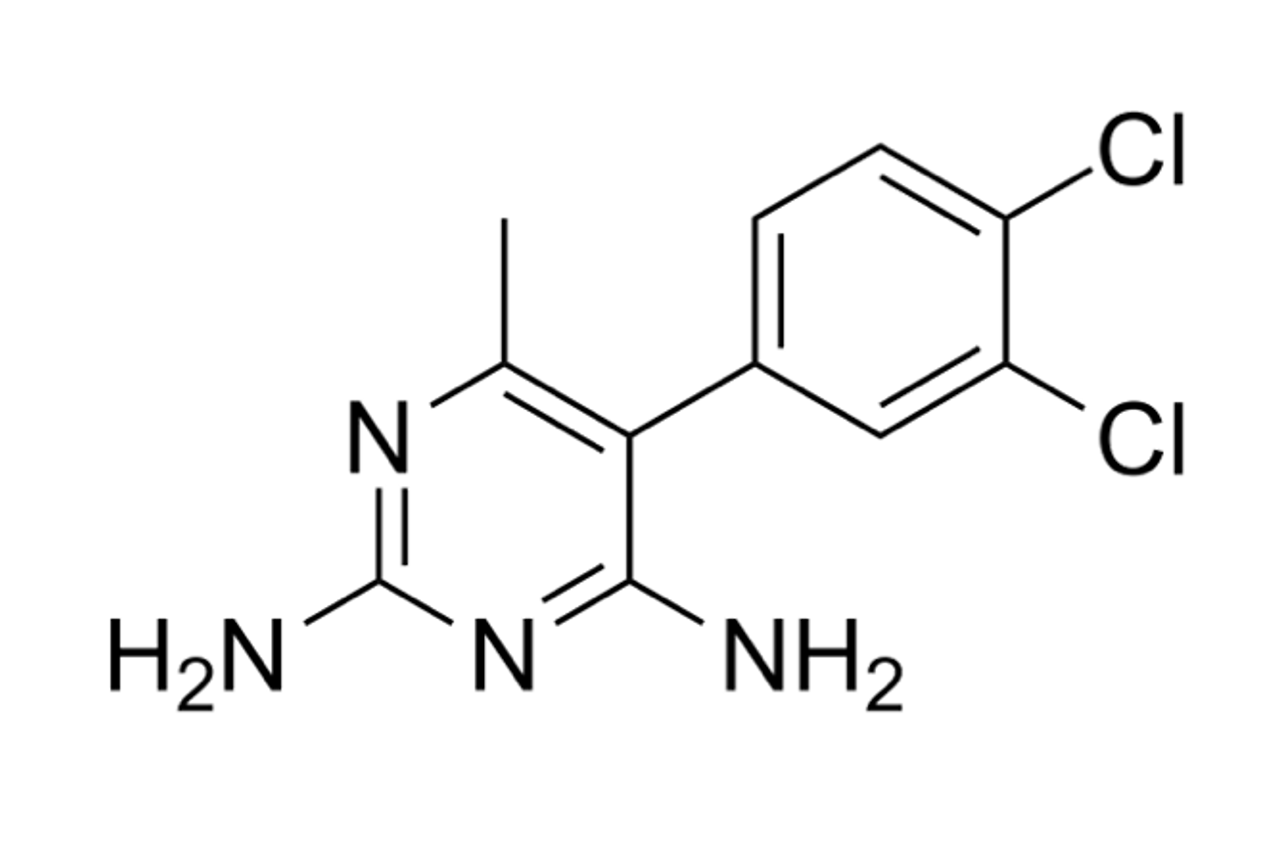
Chemical structure

== Structure and reactivity ==
Metoprine belongs to the 2,4-diaminopyrimidine class and shares structural similarities with other antifolates. Its pyrimidine core, with amino groups at the 2 and 4 positions, is essential for DHFR inhibition. The benzyl group at the 6-position increases lipophilicity, aiding in membrane permeability. The molecule's basicity allows it to engage in hydrogen bonding interactions with DHFR, contributing to its biological activity.

== Available forms ==
Metoprine is not a commercially available drug but is used in research settings. It is typically supplied as a powder for laboratory studies, with some solvent-based formulations also available for experimental applications.

== Mechanism of action ==
Metoprine acts as a competitive inhibitor of DHFR by mimicking dihydrofolate (DHF) and thereby occupying the enzyme's active site. This prevents the conversion of DHF to tetrahydrofolate (THF), which is an essential cofactor for purine, thymidylate, and amino acid synthesis. Consequently, metoprine disrupts DNA and RNA synthesis, impairing cell proliferation. This mechanism underlies its potential use in chemotherapy.

In addition to DHFR inhibition, metoprine blocks HNMT, leading to increased histamine levels in the brain. This enhances histaminergic neurotransmission, which has been implicated in cognitive function, wakefulness, and behavioral modulation. Metoprine is a potent HNMT inhibitor, with a Ki value of 100 nM. Studies in rodents have demonstrated that metoprine increases locomotor activity and induces transient stereotyped behaviors.

== Biotransformation ==
While the pharmacodynamics of metoprine have been extensively studied, details on its metabolic pathways remain limited. Biotransformation and primary metabolites are not well-documented. Metoprine interacts with several genes, including HNMT, androgen receptor (AR), cytochrome c oxidase subunit 4I1 (COX4I1), estrogen receptor 1 (ESR1), and tumor protein p53 (TP53).

=== Absorption and distribution ===
Metoprine is well-absorbed and widely distributed across various tissues. Highest tissue-to-plasma ratios are obtained in the brain, lung, pancreas, and skin, attributed to its lipophilicity and ability to cross the blood-brain barrier. A 1981 study suggested complex pharmacokinetics, including non-linear elimination patterns and prolonged retention in tissues. Only 5-17% of an administered dose is excreted in the urine within a 120-hour period, indicating extensive metabolism or tissue accumulation. The exact elimination pathways—whether renal, biliary, or other routes—are not well-documented.

== Indications ==
Metoprine has been explored for multiple therapeutic applications, including:

- Cancer treatment: As a DHFR inhibitor, metoprine showed promise in early trials for conditions such as central nervous system leukemia, melanoma, and epidermoid carcinoma. However, its development was halted due to CNS and hematological toxicity.
- Neurological research: Due to its ability to elevate brain histamine levels, metoprine has been investigated for its effects on cognition and wakefulness. In narcoleptic mouse models, it prolonged wakefulness and suppressed cataplexy, suggesting potential in sleep disorder therapy.

== Efficacy and side effects ==
Metoprine has been investigated for its antitumor effects in various cancers. Clinical trials assessed metoprine's efficacy in cancer treatment, with phase I studies administering doses between 20 and 65 mg/m^{2} without leucovorin and 100–300 mg/m^{2} with leucovorin rescue. Responses were observed in mycosis fungoides, non-Hodgkin's lymphoma, and adenocarcinoma of unknown origin. However, no objective tumor regression was noted in colorectal carcinoma patients.

Metoprine has also been linked to memory enhancement by inhibiting histamine breakdown. In a 2000 study, treatment with metoprine reversed scopolamine-induced amnesia in mice via histaminergic mechanisms activating histamine H1 receptors.

Common side effects include nausea, vomiting, leukopenia, and thrombocytopenia.

== Toxicity ==
Metoprine's clinical development was discontinued primarily due to CNS and hematological toxicity. In phase I trials, CNS toxicity manifested as seizures, drowsiness, and dizziness, which were significant at high doses (300 mg/m^{2}). Hematologic toxicity, including thrombocytopenia and leukopenia, was dose-limiting at 65 mg/m^{2} without leucovorin.

In a phase II colorectal carcinoma trial, CNS toxicity occurred in 54% of patients, further discouraging continued development.

== Effects in animals ==
Metoprine exhibits species-specific toxicity profiles. In rats, the intraperitoneal LD_{50} is 7 mg/kg, whereas in mice, the subcutaneous LD_{50} is 50 mg/kg. Behavioral studies in mice indicate that metoprine alters histaminergic and dopaminergic signaling, affecting locomotor activity and neurotransmitter turnover. It also modulates methamphetamine-induced hyperlocomotion, suggesting potential interactions with stimulant drugs.
