= Transposon tagging =

In genetic engineering, transposon tagging is a process where transposons (transposable elements) are amplified inside a biological cell by a tagging technique. Transposon tagging has been used with several species to isolate genes. Even without knowing the nature of the specific genes, the process can still be used.

== In plants ==
By molecular separation of transposons, from a cell nucleus, the cloning is enabled for genes which contain the transposons.

By using transposon tagging, researchers have been able to add genetic elements from maize (corn) and Antirrhinum into some other species (such as tobacco, aspen, and others). A gene responsible for a particular phenotype can be cloned within a given species, when movement is accompanied by the presence of a mutant phenotype.
