= European Bank for induced pluripotent Stem Cells =

The European Bank for induced pluripotent Stem Cells (EBiSC) is a non-profit induced pluripotent stem cell (iPSC) biorepository and service provider with central facilities in Germany and the United Kingdom.

EBiSC was set up between 2014 and 2017 by a consortium that represented researchers, clinicians and industry stakeholders. A second phase of the project runs between 2019 and 2022 with the aim of consolidating EBiSC as a not-for-profit, self-sustainable iPSC bank and service provider. The initiative was funded by the European Commission and the European Federation of Pharmaceutical Industries and Associations under the Innovative Medicines Initiative.

The European Bank for induced pluripotent Stem Cells performs collection, banking, quality control and distribution of iPSC lines for research purposes. EBiSC's stated goal is to supply academic, non-profit and commercial researchers with quality-controlled, disease-relevant iPSC lines, data and other services. It also seeks to promote the international standardisation of iPSC banking practices and to act as a central hub that ensures the sustainability and accessibility of iPSC lines generated by different research organisations. IPSC lines generated externally can be deposited into EBiSC for storage, banking, quality control and distribution.

== Catalogue and facilities ==
In February 2020, the EBiSC catalogue contained iPSC lines representing diseases and conditions such as Alzheimer's disease, Frontotemporal Dementia, Parkinson's disease, Huntington's disease, Dravet syndrome, Bardet-Biedl syndrome, depression and pain, diabetes mellitus, eye diseases and heart disease. These iPSC lines have been deposited into EBiSC by academic institutions and non-profit and commercial organisations internationally. This includes lines generated within research projects such as StemBANCC, HipSci, IMI-ADAPTED, CRACK IT BadIPS and CRACK IT UnTangle.

The EBiSC Bank is run collaboratively by Fraunhofer UK Research Ltd in Glasgow, Scotland and the Fraunhofer Institute for Biomedical Engineering (IBMT) in Germany.
