= Imidazoleacetic acid =

Clinical data
- Other names: IAA; Imidazole-acetic acid; Imidazole-4-acetic acid; IMA; I4AA
- Routes of administration: Oral
- Drug class: GABA_{A} receptor partial agonist; GABA_{A}-ρ receptor antagonist or weak partial agonist; Imidazoline I_{1} receptor ligand
- ATC code: None

Identifiers
- IUPAC name: 2-(1H-imidazol-5-yl)acetic acid
- CAS Number: 645-65-8
- PubChem CID: 96215
- ChemSpider: 86856
- UNII: IGZ30Z24EJ
- KEGG: C02835
- ChEBI: CHEBI:16974
- ChEMBL: ChEMBL784
- CompTox Dashboard (EPA): DTXSID50214751

Chemical and physical data
- Formula: C_{5}H_{6}N_{2}O_{2}
- Molar mass: 126.115 g·mol^{−1}
- 3D model (JSmol): Interactive image
- SMILES: C1=C(NC=N1)CC(=O)O
- InChI: InChI=1S/C5H6N2O2/c8-5(9)1-4-2-6-3-7-4/h2-3H,1H2,(H,6,7)(H,8,9); Key:PRJKNHOMHKJCEJ-UHFFFAOYSA-N

Imidazoleacetic acid (also known as IAA, IMA, imidazole-4-acetic acid, or I4AA) is a naturally occurring endogenous metabolite of the neurotransmitter histamine (imidazole-4-ethylamine). It might have a role as an endogenous signaling molecule or neurotransmitter. IAA is formed from histamine by the enzyme diamine oxidase (DAO).

== Pharmacology ==
The compound is biologically active, acting as a relatively potent GABA_{A} receptor partial agonist and GABA_{A}-ρ receptor antagonist or weak partial agonist. It shows varying activational efficacies or functional selectivity at GABA_{A} receptors of different α subunit compositions, with E_{max} values ranging from 24 to 72%. Unlike certain other GABA_{A} receptor agonists like muscimol, it is not a significant GABA reuptake inhibitor. In addition to its GABA receptor interactions, IAA is an imidazoline I_{1} receptor ligand. It has relatively low affinity for this receptor however and it is unknown whether it is an agonist or an antagonist. As a metabolite of histamine, it is structurally distinct from other GABA_{A} receptor agonists. Unlike γ-aminobutyric acid (GABA), IAA is orally active and is readily able to cross the blood–brain barrier.

IAA produces a hypnotic state resembling sleep when administered parenterally to animals. This is often or usually accompanied by seizures. Other effects include hyperactivity, ataxia, catalepsy, analgesia, hypothermia, and hypotension. Most of these effects are thought to be due to the compound's GABA_{A} receptor interactions. The hypotensive effects of IAA might be mediated by imidazoline I_{1} receptor activation, although GABA_{A} receptor activation could alternatively explain these particular effects.

== Clinical studies ==
IAA has been clinically studied in humans, for instance in people with Huntington's disease. The drug was administered orally and intravenously, which appeared to successfully elevate circulating IAA concentrations. However, IAA did not produce behavioral or motor changes in the patients nor did it improve condition symptoms even when given at very high doses. It is possible that IAA may be rapidly eliminated in humans, which may limit the effects of exogenous IAA.

== See also ==
- 1-Methylhistamine
- Piperidine-4-sulphonic acid
- Gaboxadol
