= Oxidative deamination =

Metabolic process

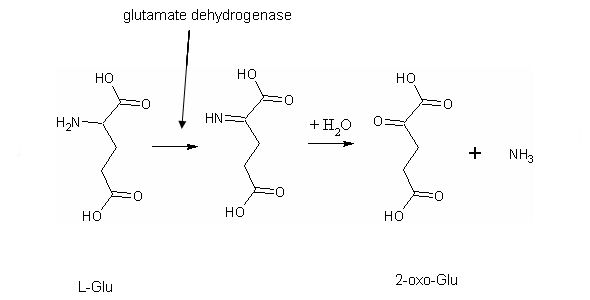
Oxidative deamination of glutamate by glutamate dehydrogenase. In the process, an imino acid forms, which hydrolyzes to the corresponding keto acid, in this case α-ketoglutarate, and ammonia.

Oxidative deamination is a form of deamination that generates α-keto acids and other oxidized products from amine-containing compounds, and occurs primarily in the liver. Oxidative deamination is stereospecific, meaning it contains different stereoisomers as reactants and products; this process is either catalyzed by L or D- amino acid oxidase and L-amino acid oxidase is present only in the liver and kidney. Oxidative deamination is an important step in the catabolism of amino acids, generating a more metabolizable form of the amino acid, and also generating ammonia as a toxic byproduct. The ammonia generated in this process can then be neutralized into urea via the urea cycle.

Much of the oxidative deamination occurring in cells involves the amino acid glutamate, which can be oxidatively deaminated by the enzyme glutamate dehydrogenase (GDH), using NAD or NADP as a coenzyme. This reaction generates α-ketoglutarate (α-KG) and ammonia. Glutamate can then be regenerated from α-KG via the action of transaminases or aminotransferase, which catalyze the transfer of an amino group from an amino acid to an α-keto acid. In this manner, an amino acid can transfer its amine group to glutamate, after which GDH can then liberate ammonia via oxidative deamination. This is a common pathway during amino acid catabolism.

Another enzyme responsible for oxidative deamination is monoamine oxidase, which catalyzes the deamination of monoamines via addition of oxygen. This generates the corresponding ketone- or aldehyde-containing form of the molecule, and generates ammonia. Monoamine oxidases MAO-A and MAO-B play vital roles in the degradation and inactivation of monoamine neurotransmitters such as serotonin and epinephrine. Monoamine oxidases are important drug targets, targeted by MAO inhibitors (MAOIs) such as selegiline. Glutamate dehydrogenase play an important role in oxidative deamination.
