= Deuterated 2C-B =

Deuterated-2C-B, also known as deutero-2C-B or deu-2C-B, is a deuterated form of 2C-B and may refer to:

- α,α-Dideutero-2C-B
- 2CB-2OCD_{3} (2-trideuteromethoxy-2C-B)
- 2CB-5OCD_{3} (5-trideuteromethoxy-2C-B)
- Hexadeutero-2C-B (2,5-di(trideuteromethoxy)-2C-B)

== See also ==
- Deumescaline
- CYB005
- d2-MDMA
- Deudimethyltryptamine
- Deupsilocin
