= Amine oxidase (copper-containing) =

amine oxidase

Identifiers
- EC no.: 1.4.3.6
- CAS no.: 9001-53-0

Databases
- BRENDA: enzyme data
- ExPASy: NiceZyme view
- KEGG: enzyme entry
- MetaCyc: metabolic pathway
- Rhea: reactions
- PDB structures: RCSB PDB PDBe PDBsum
- Gene Ontology: AmiGO / QuickGO
Search
- PMC: articles
- PubMed: articles
- NCBI: proteins

Copper amine oxidase, enzyme domain
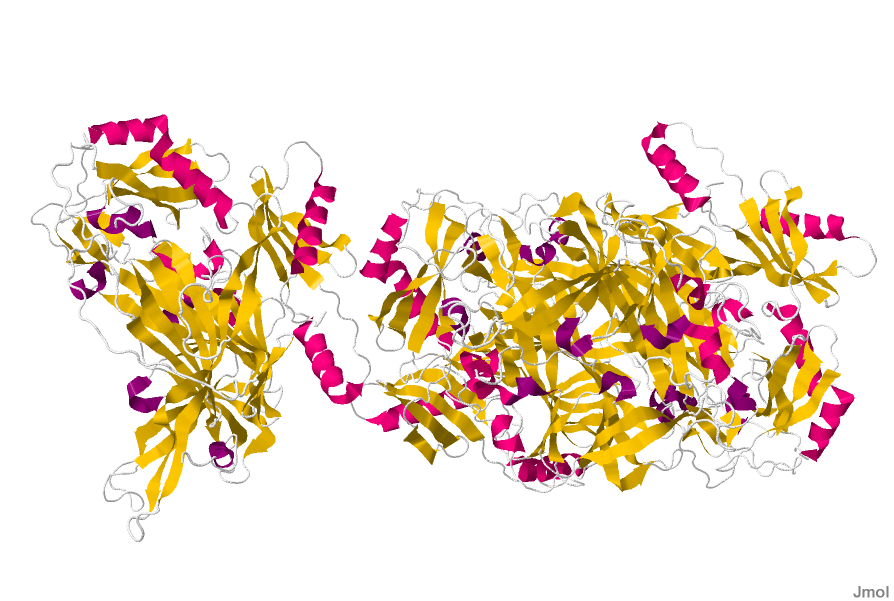
- Crystal structure of a copper-containing benzylamine oxidase from Hansenula polymorpha.

Identifiers
- Symbol: Cu_amine_oxid
- Pfam: PF01179
- InterPro: IPR015798
- PROSITE: PDOC00895
- SCOP2: 1oac / SCOPe / SUPFAM
- Membranome: 252
Available protein structures:
- PDB: IPR015798 PF01179 (ECOD; PDBsum)
- AlphaFold: IPR015798; PF01179

Copper amine oxidase N-terminal domain
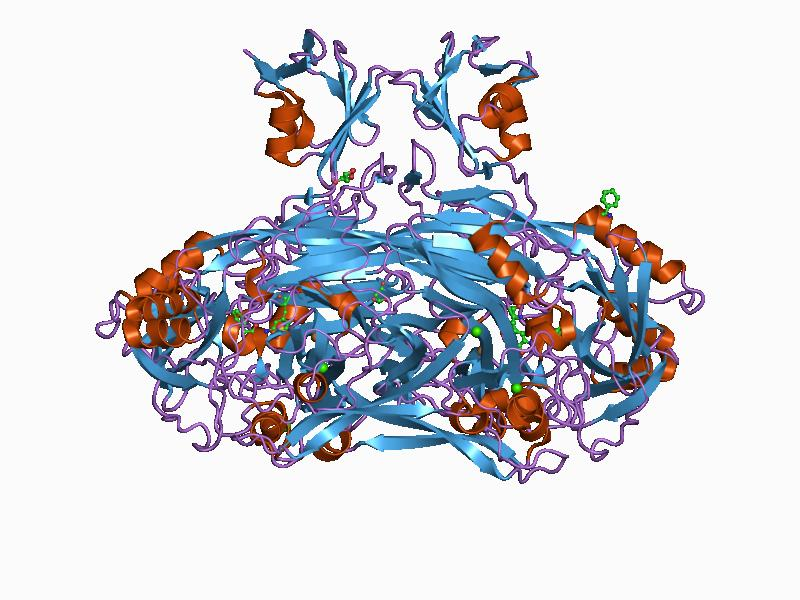
- crystal structure of e. coli amine oxidase anaerobically reduced with beta-phenylethylamine

Identifiers
- Symbol: Cu_amine_oxidN1
- Pfam: PF07833
- InterPro: IPR012854
- SCOP2: 1spu / SCOPe / SUPFAM
Available protein structures:
- PDB: IPR012854 PF07833 (ECOD; PDBsum)
- AlphaFold: IPR012854; PF07833

Copper amine oxidase, N2 domain
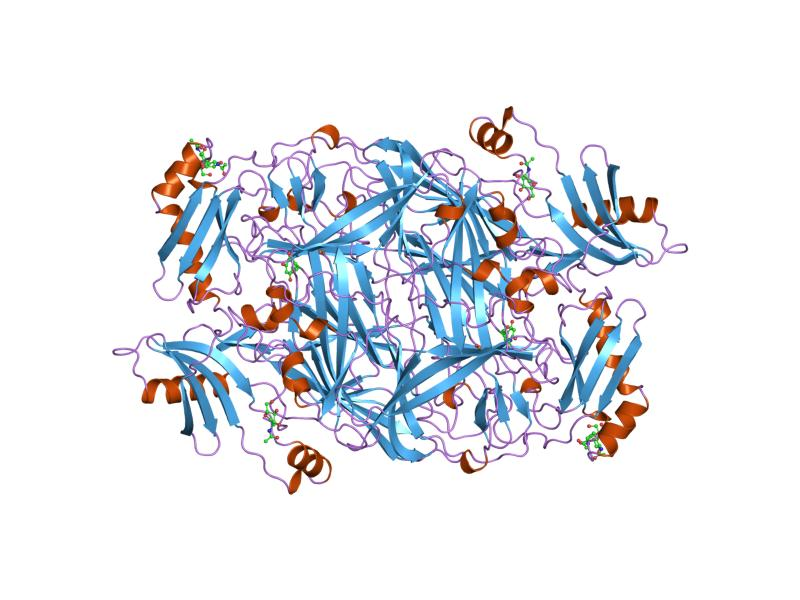
- crystal structure of a eukaryotic (pea seedling) copper-containing amine oxidase at 2.2a resolution

Identifiers
- Symbol: Cu_amine_oxidN2
- Pfam: PF02727
- Pfam clan: CL0047
- InterPro: IPR015800
- PROSITE: PDOC00895
- SCOP2: 1oac / SCOPe / SUPFAM
Available protein structures:
- PDB: IPR015800 PF02727 (ECOD; PDBsum)
- AlphaFold: IPR015800; PF02727

Copper amine oxidase, N3 domain
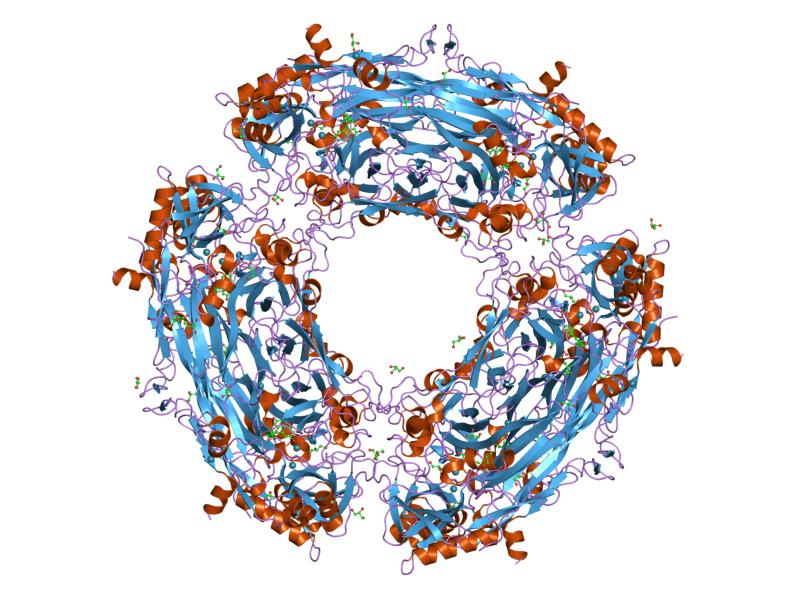
- crystal structure of hansenula polymorpha amine oxidase in complex with xe to 1.6 angstroms

Identifiers
- Symbol: Cu_amine_oxidN3
- Pfam: PF02728
- Pfam clan: CL0047
- InterPro: IPR015802
- PROSITE: PDOC00895
- SCOP2: 1oac / SCOPe / SUPFAM
Available protein structures:
- PDB: IPR015802 PF02728 (ECOD; PDBsum)
- AlphaFold: IPR015802; PF02728

Amine oxidase (copper-containing) (AOC) (EC 1.4.3.21 and EC 1.4.3.22; formerly EC 1.4.3.6) is a family of amine oxidase enzymes which includes both primary-amine oxidase and diamine oxidase; these enzymes catalyze the oxidation of a wide range of biogenic amines including many neurotransmitters, histamine and xenobiotic amines. They act as a disulphide-linked homodimer. They catalyse the oxidation of primary amines to aldehydes, with the subsequent release of ammonia and hydrogen peroxide, which requires one copper ion per subunit and topaquinone as cofactor:

RCH_{2}NH_{2} + H_{2}O + O_{2} ⇌ RCHO + NH_{3} + H_{2}O_{2}

The three substrates of this enzyme are primary amines (RCH_{2}NH_{2}), H_{2}O, and O_{2}, whereas its three products are RCHO, NH_{3}, and H_{2}O_{2}.

Copper-containing amine oxidases are found in bacteria, fungi, plants and animals. In prokaryotes, the enzyme enables various amine substrates to be used as sources of carbon and nitrogen.

This enzyme belongs to oxidoreductases, specifically those acting on the CH-NH_{2} group of donors with oxygen as acceptor. The systematic name of this enzyme class is amine:oxygen oxidoreductase (deaminating) (copper-containing). This enzyme participates in eight metabolic pathways: urea cycle and metabolism of amino groups, glycine, serine and threonine metabolism, histidine metabolism, tyrosine metabolism, phenylalanine metabolism, tryptophan metabolism, beta-alanine metabolism, and alkaloid biosynthesis ii. It has two cofactors: copper, and pyrroloquinoline quinone (PQQ).

== Structure ==
The copper amine oxidase 3-dimensional structure was determined through X-ray crystallography. The copper amine oxidases occur as mushroom-shaped homodimers of 70-95 kDa, each monomer containing a copper ion and a covalently bound redox cofactor, topaquinone (TPQ). Topaquinone is formed by post-translational modification of a conserved tyrosine residue. The copper ion is coordinated with three histidine residues and two water molecules in a distorted square pyramidal geometry, and has a dual function in catalysis and topaquinone biogenesis. The catalytic domain is the largest of the three to four domains found in copper amine oxidases, and consists of a beta sandwich of 18 strands in two sheets. The active site is buried and requires a conformational change to allow the substrate access.

The N2 and N3 N-terminal domains share a common structural fold, its core consisting of alpha-beta(4), where the helix is packed against the coiled anti-parallel beta-sheets. An additional domain is found at the N-terminal of some copper amine oxidases, as well as in related proteins such as cell wall hydrolase and N-acetylmuramoyl-L-alanine amidase. This domain consists of a five-stranded antiparallel beta-sheet twisted around an alpha helix.

== Function ==
In eukaryotes they have a broader range of functions, including cell differentiation and growth, wound healing, detoxification and cell signalling; one AOC enzyme (AOC3) functions as a vascular adhesion protein (VAP-1) in some mammalian tissues.

== Human proteins containing this domain ==
- AOC1
- AOC2
- AOC3

== See also ==
- Copper in health
