= Α,α-Dideuterotryptamine =

α,α-Dideuterotryptamine

Clinical data
- Other names: α,α-Dideutero-tryptamine; α,α-Bisdeuterotryptamine; α,α-[^{2}H_{2}]T; D_{2}-Tryptamine; D_{2}-T
- ATC code: None

Identifiers
- IUPAC name: 1,1-dideuterio-2-(1H-indol-3-yl)ethanamine
- PubChem CID: 10654563
- ChemSpider: 8829918

Chemical and physical data
- Formula: C_{10}H_{12}N_{2}
- Molar mass: 160.220 g·mol^{−1}
- 3D model (JSmol): Interactive image
- SMILES: [2H]C([2H])(CC1=CNC2=CC=CC=C21)N
- InChI: InChI=1S/C10H12N2/c11-6-5-8-7-12-10-4-2-1-3-9(8)10/h1-4,7,12H,5-6,11H2/i6D2; Key:APJYDQYYACXCRM-NCYHJHSESA-N

α,α-Dideuterotryptamine, also known as D_{2}-tryptamine (D_{2}-T), is a deuterated isotopologue of tryptamine. It is the analogue of tryptamine in which the two hydrogen atoms at the α position have been replaced with the deuterium isotopes.

== Pharmacology ==
α,α-Dideuterotryptamine has been found to have markedly intensified sympathomimetic or pressor effects compared to tryptamine in cats. It was concluded that this was due to the kinetic isotope effect and reduced monoamine oxidase (MAO) metabolism. Subsequently, it was found that levels of α,α-dideuterotryptamine were 6.3-fold higher in the brain, 3.5-fold higher in the liver, and 1.7-fold higher in plasma than those of tryptamine after 60 minutes when both drugs were given via intraperitoneal injection in rats. Concomitant treatment with the monoamine oxidase inhibitor (MAOI) iproniazid abolished these differences in levels, such that the ratios between the two drugs were 1.1 in the brain, 1.0 in the liver, and 1.0 in plasma. These findings suggest that the effect of α,α-deuteration was indeed to prevent metabolism by MAO. No behavioral effects of α,α-dideuterotryptamine were observed at the employed doses, suggesting that higher doses may have still been needed for such effects.

In contrast to α,α-dideuterotryptamine, another deuterated isotopologue, β,β-dideuterotryptamine, did not show resistance to metabolism compared to tryptamine. Although α,α-dideuterotryptamine was resistant to metabolism compared to tryptamine, it showed a much lower comparative degree of resistance relative to α,α-dideuterophenethylamine versus phenethylamine, the former of which showed 67-fold higher levels in the brain than the latter. The reasons for this difference are unclear, but it was suggested that other enzymes may also play an important role in the metabolism of tryptamine.

== History ==
α,α-Dideuterotryptamine was first described in the scientific literature by 1961. It was subsequently studied in greater detail in the mid-1980s.

== See also ==
- Substituted tryptamine
- SPL028 (α,α-dideutero-DMT)
- DMT-d4 (α,α,β,β-tetradeutero-DMT)
- Deudimethyltryptamine (decadeutero-DMT; DMT-d10; HLP004; CYB004)
- α,α-Dideuterophenethylamine
- N-(2-Cyanoethyl)tryptamine (CE-T or CET)
