= Phenethylamine =

Trace amine

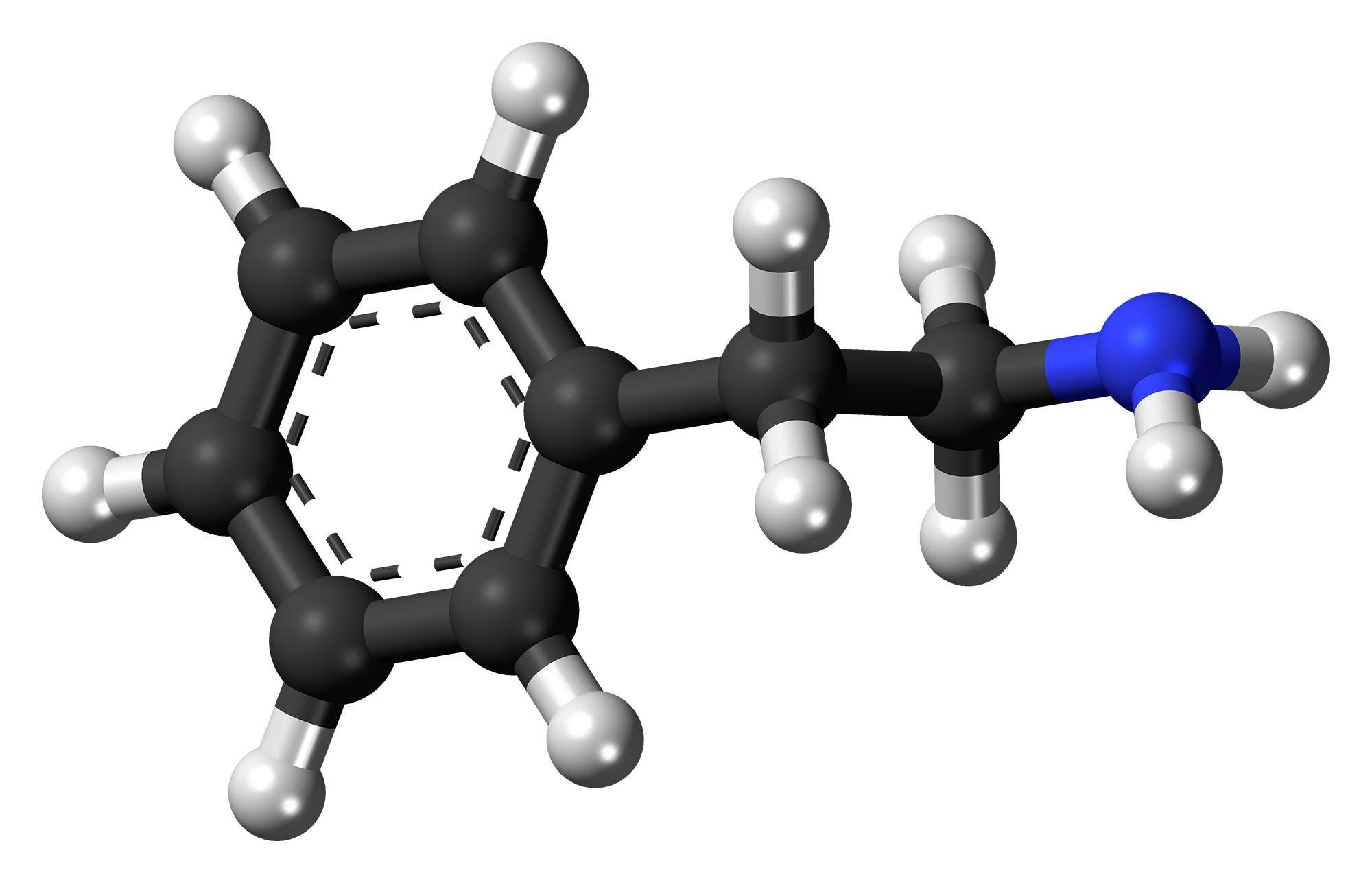

Clinical data
- Pronunciation: /fɛnˈɛθələmiːn/
- Other names: Phenylethylamine; PEA; β-Phenylethylamine; β-Phenylethylamine; β-PEA; 2-Phenylethylamine; 2-PEA; Phetamine
- Dependence liability: Psychological: Low–moderate; Physical: None
- Addiction liability: None–low (w/o an MAO-B inhibitor); Moderate (with an MAO-B inhibitor)
- Routes of administration: Oral
- Drug class: Norepinephrine–dopamine releasing agent; Trace amine-associated receptor 1 (TAAR1) agonist; Stimulant
- ATC code: None

Physiological data
- Source tissues: Substantia nigra pars compacta; Ventral tegmental area; Locus coeruleus; many others
- Target tissues: System-wide
- Receptors: Varies greatly across species; Human receptors: hTAAR1
- Precursor: L-Phenylalanine
- Biosynthesis: Aromatic L-amino acid decarboxylase (AADC)
- Metabolism: Primarily: MAO-B; Other enzymes: MAO-A, SSAOs (AOC2 & AOC3), PNMT, AANAT, FMO3, and others

Legal status
- Legal status: AU: Unscheduled; CA: Unscheduled; NZ: Unscheduled; UK: Unscheduled; US: Unscheduled; UN: Unscheduled

Pharmacokinetic data
- Metabolism: Primarily: MAO-B; Other enzymes: MAO-A, SSAOs (AOC2 & AOC3), PNMT, AANAT, FMO3, and others
- Elimination half-life: Exogenous: 5–10 minutes; Endogenous: ~30 seconds
- Excretion: Renal (kidneys)

Identifiers
- IUPAC name: 2-Phenylethan-1-amine
- CAS Number: 64-04-0
- PubChem CID: 1001
- IUPHAR/BPS: 2144
- DrugBank: DB04325
- ChemSpider: 13856352
- UNII: 327C7L2BXQ
- KEGG: C05332
- ChEBI: CHEBI:18397
- ChEMBL: ChEMBL610
- NIAID ChemDB: 018561
- CompTox Dashboard (EPA): DTXSID5058773
- ECHA InfoCard: 100.000.523

Chemical and physical data
- Formula: C_{8}H_{11}N
- Molar mass: 121.183 g·mol^{−1}
- 3D model (JSmol): Interactive image
- Density: 0.9640 g/cm^{3}
- Melting point: −60 °C (−76 °F)
- Boiling point: 195 °C (383 °F)
- SMILES: NCCc1ccccc1
- InChI: InChI=1S/C8H11N/c9-7-6-8-4-2-1-3-5-8/h1-5H,6-7,9H2; Key:BHHGXPLMPWCGHP-UHFFFAOYSA-N

Phenethylamine (PEA) (Note: Synonyms and alternate spellings include: phenylethylamine, β-phenylethylamine (β-PEA), 2-phenylethylamine, 1-amino-2-phenylethane, and 2-phenylethan-1-amine.) is an organic compound, natural monoamine alkaloid, and trace amine, which acts as a central nervous system stimulant in humans. In the brain, phenethylamine regulates monoamine neurotransmission by binding to trace amine-associated receptor 1 (TAAR1) and inhibiting vesicular monoamine transporter 2 (VMAT2) in monoamine neurons. To a lesser extent, it also acts as a neurotransmitter in the human central nervous system. In mammals, phenethylamine is produced from the amino acid L-phenylalanine by the enzyme aromatic L-amino acid decarboxylase via enzymatic decarboxylation. In addition to its presence in mammals, phenethylamine is found in many other organisms and foods, such as chocolate, especially after microbial fermentation.

Phenethylamine is sold as a dietary supplement for purported mood and weight loss-related therapeutic benefits; however, in orally ingested phenethylamine, a significant amount is metabolized in the small intestine by monoamine oxidase B (MAO-B) and then aldehyde dehydrogenase (ALDH), which converts it to phenylacetic acid. This means that for significant concentrations to reach the brain, the dosage must be higher than for other methods of administration. Some authors have postulated that phenethylamine plays a role in affection without substantiating these claims with any direct evidence.

Phenethylamines, or more properly, substituted phenethylamines, are the group of phenethylamine derivatives that contain phenethylamine as a "backbone"; in other words, this chemical class includes derivative compounds that are formed by replacing one or more hydrogen atoms in the phenethylamine core structure with substituents. The class of substituted phenethylamines includes all substituted amphetamines, and substituted methylenedioxyphenethylamines (MDxx), and contains many drugs which act as empathogens, stimulants, psychedelics, anorectics, bronchodilators, decongestants, and/or antidepressants, among others.

== Natural occurrence ==
Phenethylamine is produced by a wide range of species throughout the plant and animal kingdoms, including humans; it is also produced by certain fungi and bacteria (genera: Lactobacillus, Clostridium, Pseudomonas and the family Enterobacteriaceae) and acts as a potent antimicrobial against certain pathogenic strains of Escherichia coli (e.g., the O157:H7 strain) at sufficient concentrations.

== Chemistry ==
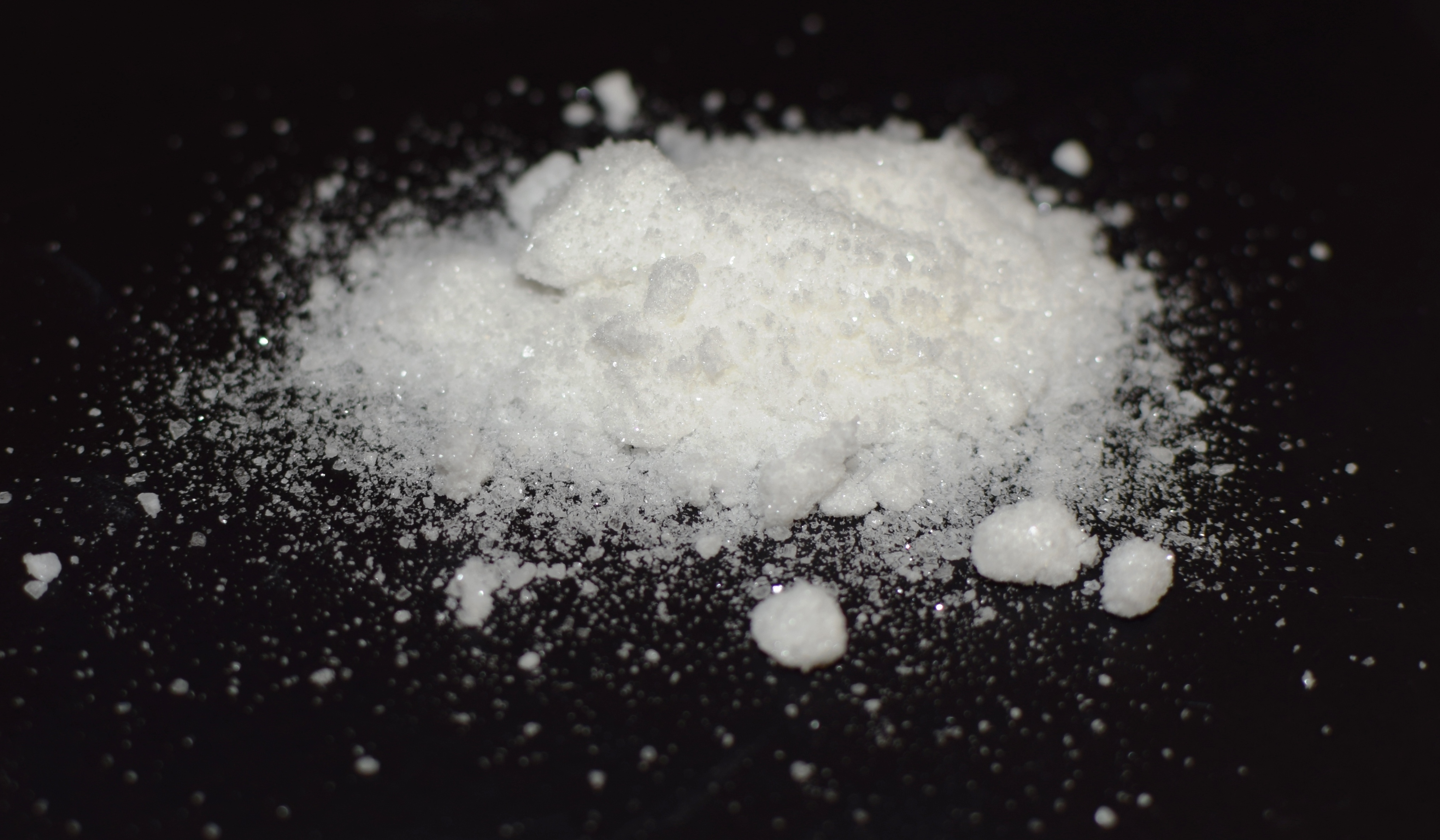

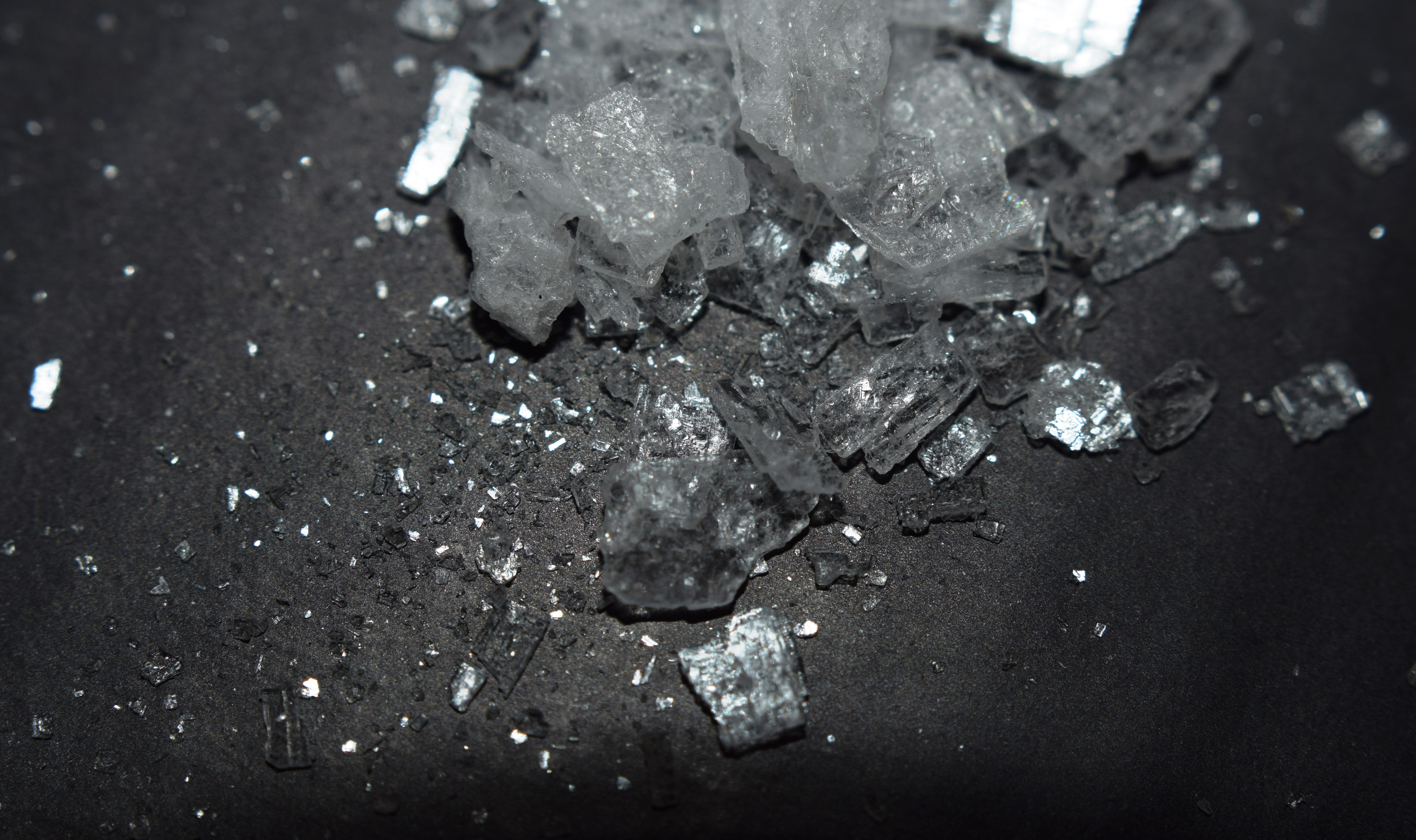
PEA hydrochloride powder and crystals

Phenethylamine is a primary amine, the amino-group being attached to a benzene ring through a two-carbon, or ethyl group. It is a colourless liquid at room temperature that has a fishy odor, and is soluble in water, ethanol and ether. Its density is 0.964 g/ml and its boiling point is 195 °C. Upon exposure to air, it combines with carbon dioxide to form a solid carbonate salt. Phenethylamine is strongly basic, pK_{b} = 4.17 (or pK_{a} = 9.83), as measured using the HCl salt, and forms a stable crystalline hydrochloride salt with a melting point of 217 °C. Its experimental log P is 1.41.

=== Analogues and derivatives ===
Substituted phenethylamines are a chemical class of organic compounds based upon the phenethylamine structure; (Note: In other words, all of the compounds that belong to this class are structural analogs of phenethylamine.) the class is composed of all the derivative compounds of phenethylamine which can be formed by replacing, or substituting, one or more hydrogen atoms in the phenethylamine core structure with substituents.

Many substituted phenethylamines are psychoactive drugs, which belong to a variety of different drug classes, including central nervous system stimulants (e.g., amphetamine), hallucinogens (e.g., 2,5-dimethoxy-4-methylamphetamine), entactogens (e.g., 3,4-methylenedioxyamphetamine), appetite suppressants (e.g. phentermine), nasal decongestants and bronchodilators (e.g., pseudoephedrine), antidepressants (e.g. bupropion), antiparkinson agents (e.g., selegiline), and vasopressors (e.g., ephedrine), among others. Many of these psychoactive compounds exert their pharmacological effects primarily by modulating monoamine neurotransmitter systems; however, there is no mechanism of action or biological target that is common to all members of this subclass.

Numerous endogenous compounds—including hormones, monoamine neurotransmitters, and many trace amines (e.g., dopamine, norepinephrine, adrenaline, tyramine, and others)—are substituted phenethylamines. Dopamine is simply phenethylamine with a hydroxyl group attached to the 3 and 4 position of the benzene ring. Several notable recreational drugs, such as MDMA (ecstasy), methamphetamine, and cathinones, are also members of the class. All of the substituted amphetamines are phenethylamines, as well.

Pharmaceutical drugs that are substituted phenethylamines include phenelzine, phenformin, and fanetizole, among many others.

The N-methylated derivative of phenethylamine is N-methylphenethylamine.

A deuterated isotopologue of phenethylamine with resistance to monoamine oxidase (MAO)-mediated metabolism is α,α-dideuterophenethylamine.

A notable prodrug of phenethylamine with sustained effects is N-(2-cyanoethyl)phenethylamine (CEPEA). Other prodrugs of phenethylamine have been described as well.

Analogues of phenethylamine with the ethylamine side chain extended or shortened include phenylpropylamine and benzylamine. Another related analogue is phenylalaninol.

=== Synthesis ===
One method for preparing β-phenethylamine, set forth in J. C. Robinson and H. R. Snyder's Organic Syntheses (published 1955), involves the reduction of benzyl cyanide with hydrogen in liquid ammonia, in the presence of a Raney-Nickel catalyst, at a temperature of 130 °C and a pressure of 13.8 MPa. Alternative syntheses are outlined in the footnotes to this preparation.

A much more convenient method for the synthesis of β-phenethylamine is the reduction of ω-nitrostyrene by lithium aluminium hydride in ether, whose successful execution was first reported by R. F. Nystrom and W. G. Brown in 1948.

Phenethylamine can also be produced via the cathodic reduction of benzyl cyanide in a divided cell.

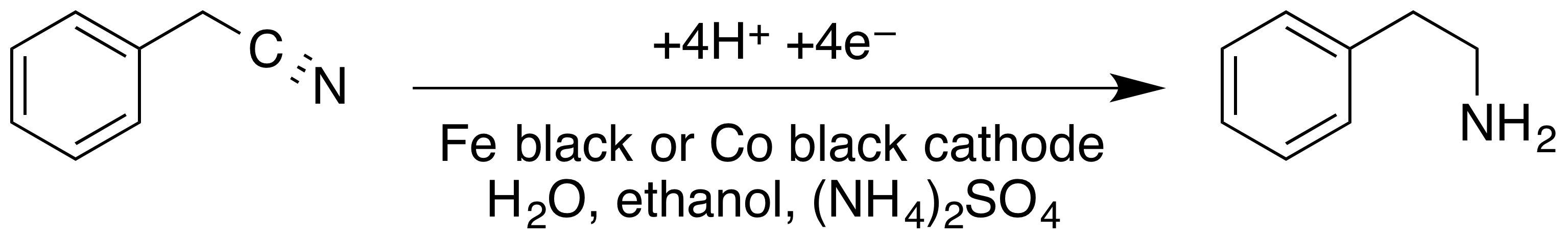
Electrosynthesis of phenethylamine from benzyl cyanide

Assembling phenethylamine structures for synthesis of compounds such as epinephrine, amphetamines, tyrosine, and dopamine by adding the beta-aminoethyl side chain to the phenyl ring is possible. This can be done via Friedel-Crafts acylation with N-protected acyl chlorides when the arene is activated, or by Heck reaction of the phenyl with N-vinyloxazolone, followed by hydrogenation, or by cross-coupling with beta-amino organozinc reagents, or reacting a brominated arene with beta-aminoethyl organolithium reagents, or by Suzuki cross-coupling.

=== Detection in body fluids ===
Reviews that cover attention deficit hyperactivity disorder (ADHD) and phenethylamine indicate that several studies have found abnormally low urinary phenethylamine concentrations in ADHD individuals when compared with controls. In treatment-responsive individuals, amphetamine and methylphenidate greatly increase urinary phenethylamine concentration. An ADHD biomarker review also indicated that urinary phenethylamine levels could be a diagnostic biomarker for ADHD.

Thirty minutes of moderate- to high-intensity physical exercise has been shown to induce an increase in urinary phenylacetic acid, the primary metabolite of phenethylamine. Two reviews noted a study where the mean 24 hour urinary phenylacetic acid concentration following just 30 minutes of intense exercise rose 77% above its base level; the reviews suggest that phenethylamine synthesis sharply increases during physical exercise during which it is rapidly metabolized due to its short half-life of roughly 30 seconds. In a resting state, phenethylamine is synthesized in catecholamine neurons from L-phenylalanine by aromatic amino acid decarboxylase at approximately the same rate as dopamine is produced. Monoamine oxidase deaminates primary and secondary amines that are free in the neuronal cytoplasm but not those bound in storage vesicles of the sympathetic neurone. Similarly, β-PEA would not be completely deaminated in the gut as it is a selective substrate for MAO-B, which is not primarily found in the gut. Brain levels of endogenous trace amines are several hundred-fold below those for the classical neurotransmitters noradrenaline, dopamine, and serotonin, but their rates of synthesis are equivalent to those of noradrenaline and dopamine and they have a very rapid turnover rate. Endogenous extracellular tissue levels of trace amines measured in the brain are in the low nanomolar range. These low concentrations arise because of their very short half-life. Because of the pharmacological relationship between phenethylamine and amphetamine, the original paper and both reviews suggest that phenethylamine plays a prominent role in mediating the mood-enhancing euphoric effects of a runner's high, as both phenethylamine and amphetamine are potent euphoriants.

Skydiving has also been shown to induce a marked increase in urinary phenethylamine concentrations.

== Pharmacology ==
Monoamine release of phenethylamine and related agents (EC_{50}, nM)
Compound	NE	DA	5-HT	Ref.
Phenethylamine	10.9	39.5	>10,000	
Tyramine	40.6	119	2,775	
Tryptamine	716	164	32.6	
Dextroamphetamine	6.6–7.2	5.8–24.8	698–1,765	
Levoamphetamine	9.5	27.7	ND	
Dextromethamphetamine	12.3–13.8	8.5–24.5	736–1,292	
Levomethamphetamine	28.5	416	4,640	
Notes: The smaller the value, the more strongly the drug releases the neurotransmitter. The assays were done in rat brain synaptosomes and human potencies may be different. See also Monoamine releasing agent § Activity profiles for a larger table with more compounds. Refs:

Phenethylamine pharmacodynamics in a TAAR1–dopamine neuron
Both amphetamine and phenethylamine induce neurotransmitter release from VMAT2 and bind to TAAR1. When either binds to TAAR1, it reduces neuron firing rate and triggers protein kinase A (PKA) and protein kinase C (PKC) signaling, resulting in DAT phosphorylation. Phosphorylated DAT then either operates in reverse or withdraws into the axon terminal and ceases transport.

=== Pharmacodynamics ===
==== Monoamine releasing agent ====
Phenethylamine, being similar to amphetamine in its action at their common biomolecular targets, is a releasing agent of norepinephrine and dopamine. It is roughly equipotent to amphetamine in this regard in vitro. Phenethylamine is inactive as a psychostimulant under normal circumstances due to rapid metabolism by monoamine oxidase (MAO), but can become active in the presence of a monoamine oxidase inhibitor (MAOI).

==== TAAR1 agonist ====
Phenethylamine is a potent agonist of the mouse, rat, and human trace amine-associated receptor 1 (TAAR1). β-PEA is also an odorant binding TAAR4 in mice thought to mediate predator avoidance. Similarly to the case of amphetamine, phenethylamine shows enhanced locomotor stimulation, a psychostimulant-like effect, in TAAR1 knockout mice.

==== Monoaminergic activity enhancer ====
Phenethylamine is a monoaminergic activity enhancer (MAE) of serotonin, norepinephrine, and dopamine in addition to its catecholamine-releasing activity. That is, it enhances the action potential-mediated release of these monoamine neurotransmitters. The compound is active as a MAE at much lower concentrations than the concentrations at which it induces the release of catecholamines. The MAE actions of phenethylamine and other MAEs may be mediated by TAAR1 agonism. Synthetic and more potent MAEs like phenylpropylaminopentane (PPAP) and selegiline (L-deprenyl) have been derived from phenethylamine.

==== Other activities ====
Unlike its derivatives norepinephrine (noradrenaline) and epinephrine (adrenaline), phenethylamine is inactive as an agonist of the α- and β-adrenergic receptors.

==== Effects in animals and humans ====
According to Alexander Shulgin in PiHKAL, phenethylamine is completely inactive in humans at doses of up to 1,600 mg orally and 50 mg intravenously. This can be attributed to its extremely rapid metabolic breakdown rather than pharmacodynamic inactivity.

Although exogenous phenethylamine on its own is inactive, its metabolism can be strongly inhibited and it can thereby become active, showing psychostimulant effects, when combined with a monoamine oxidase inhibitor (MAOI), specifically monoamine oxidase B (MAO-B) inhibitors like selegiline. Oral L-phenylalanine (a precursor of phenethylamine) and/or phenethylamine itself in combination with selegiline has been studied in the treatment of depression and has been reported to be effective. Misuse of phenethylamine in combination with selegiline has also been reported.

The LD_{50} values of phenethylamine include 175 mg/kg i.p. in mice, 320 mg/kg s.c. in mice, 100 mg/kg i.v. in mice, 100 mg/kg parenterally in mice, 39 mg/kg intracervically in mice, and 200 mg/kg i.p. in guinea pigs. Its LD_{Lo} values include 800 mg/kg p.o. in rats, 100 mg/kg i.p. in rats, 450 μg/kg s.c. in rats, and 300 mg/kg via an unspecified route in mice.

=== Pharmacokinetics ===
Biosynthetic pathways for catecholamines and trace amines in the human brain
In humans, catecholamines and phenethylaminergic trace amines are derived from the amino acid L-phenylalanine.

By oral route, phenethylamine's half-life is 5–10 minutes; endogenously produced PEA in catecholamine neurons has a half-life of roughly 30 seconds. In humans, PEA is metabolized by phenylethanolamine N-methyltransferase (PNMT), monoamine oxidase A (MAO-A), monoamine oxidase B (MAO-B), the semicarbazide-sensitive amine oxidases (SSAOs) AOC2 and AOC3, flavin-containing monooxygenase 3 (FMO3), and aralkylamine N-acetyltransferase (AANAT). N-Methylphenethylamine, an isomer of amphetamine, is produced in humans via the metabolism of phenethylamine by PNMT. β-Phenylacetic acid is the primary urinary metabolite of phenethylamine and is produced via monoamine oxidase metabolism and subsequent aldehyde dehydrogenase metabolism. Phenylacetaldehyde is the intermediate product which is produced by monoamine oxidase and then further metabolized into β-phenylacetic acid by aldehyde dehydrogenase.

When the initial phenylethylamine concentration in the brain is low, brain levels can be increased 1000-fold when taking a monoamine oxidase inhibitor (MAOI), particularly a MAO-B inhibitor, and by 3–4 times when the initial concentration is high.

== History ==
Phenethylamine was first isolated and identified by Marceli Nencki in 1876. Subsequently, it was first synthesized by Treat B. Johnson and Herbert H. Guest in 1909.

== Society and culture ==
=== Legal status ===
==== United States ====
Phenylethylamine is not a scheduled substance in the United States. However, at least one person in the United States has been prosecuted under the Federal Analogue Act for selling phenylethylamine with the prosecutions argument that PEA is a structural analog of amphetamine and methamphetamine.

== See also ==
- Substituted phenethylamine
