= Deudimethyltryptamine (disambiguation) =

Deudimethyltryptamine (deu-DMT or deuDMT), or deuterated dimethyltryptamine, may refer to:

- DMT-d4 (α,α,β,β-tetradeutero-DMT)
- Deudimethyltryptamine (HLP004; CYB004; DMT-d_{10})
- SPL028 (D_{2}-DMT; α,α-dideutero-DMT)

== See also ==
- Deuterated psilocin
- Deuterated 5-MeO-DMT
- Deuterated mescaline
