= Alpha,Beta-D =

Clinical data
- Other names: α,β-D; α,β-Dideuteromescaline; α,β-Dideutero-3,4,5-trimethoxyphenethylamine
- Routes of administration: Oral
- Drug class: Serotonergic psychedelic; Hallucinogen
- ATC code: None

Pharmacokinetic data
- Onset of action: Somewhat more rapid than mescaline
- Duration of action: Unknown

Identifiers
- IUPAC name: 2-(3,4,5-trimethoxyphenyl)(1,2-^{2}H_{2})ethan-1-amine

Chemical and physical data
- Formula: C_{11}H_{15}D_{2}NO_{3}
- Molar mass: 213.272 g·mol^{−1}
- 3D model (JSmol): Interactive image
- SMILES: COC1=CC(C(C(N)[2H])[2H])=CC(OC)=C1OC
- InChI: InChI=1S/C11H17NO3/c1-13-9-6-8(4-5-12)7-10(14-2)11(9)15-3/h6-7H,4-5,12H2,1-3H3/i4D,5D; Key:RHCSKNNOAZULRK-KFRNQKGQSA-N

Alpha,Beta-D, or α,β-D, also known as α,β-dideuteromescaline, is a psychedelic drug of the phenethylamine and scaline families related to mescaline. It is the deuterated isotopologue of mescaline in which one hydrogen atom at the α position and one hydrogen atom at the β position have been replaced with the deuterium isotopes.

According to Daniel Trachsel in his book Phenethylamine: von der Struktur zur Funktion (Phenethylamines: From Structure to Function), α,β-D at a dose of 250 mg orally produces effects comparable to an equivalent dose of mescaline, but had a somewhat more rapid onset. This information was based on anonymous personal communication to Trachsel in 2009. The similar potency of α,β-D to mescaline is in contrast to the case of α-D (α,α-dideuteromescaline), which was reported to be roughly one-third more potent than mescaline based on limited testing.

The chemical synthesis of α,β-D has been described. It has four possible theoretical stereoisomers.

α,β-D was first described in the scientific literature by Trachsel in his book in 2013.

== See also ==
- Scaline
- Alpha-D
- Beta-D
- 4-D
- Deumescaline
