= TPQ =

TPQ may refer to:

- Terminus post quem, the earliest possible date (used to give an approximate date for an event or text)
- Amado Nervo International Airport, Tepic, Nayarit, Mexico, IATA airport code:
- Tridimensional Personality Questionnaire (TPQ)
- Topaquinone, a biochemical
