= SSAO =

SSAO may refer to:

- Screen space ambient occlusion, an implementation of an ambient occlusion illumination in computer graphics
- Semicarbazide-sensitive amine oxidase, an enzyme
