= Amine oxidase =

Enzyme

An amine oxidase is an enzyme that catalyzes the oxidative cleavage of alkylamines into aldehydes and ammonia:

RCH_{2}NH_{2} + H_{2}O + O_{2} $\rightleftharpoons$ RCHO + NH_{3} + H_{2}O_{2}

Amine oxidases are divided into two subfamilies based on the cofactor they contain:

| Class | Cofactor | Subclass | Enzyme Commission number | Human genes |
|---|---|---|---|---|
| Amine oxidase (formerly EC 1.4.3.6) | copper | lysyl oxidase | EC 1.4.3.13 | LOX |
| Amine oxidase (formerly EC 1.4.3.6) | copper | primary-amine oxidase | EC 1.4.3.21 | AOC2, AOC3 |
| Amine oxidase (formerly EC 1.4.3.6) | copper | diamine oxidase | EC 1.4.3.22 | AOC1 |
| Monoamine oxidase | flavin | N/A | EC 1.4.3.4 | MAOA, MAOB |
