= DMT-d4 =

Clinical data
- Other names: D_{4}DMT; [^{2}H4]-DMT; Dimethyltryptamine-d4; α,α,β,β-Tetradeutero-DMT; α,α,β,β-Tetradeutero-N,N-dimethyltryptamine
- Drug class: Serotonin receptor modulator; Serotonergic psychedelic; Hallucinogen
- ATC code: None

Identifiers
- IUPAC name: 1,1,2,2-tetradeuterio-2-(1H-indol-3-yl)-N,N-dimethylethanamine
- CAS Number: 82069-09-8
- PubChem CID: 12244274
- ChemSpider: 128733862

Chemical and physical data
- Formula: C_{12}H_{16}N_{2}
- Molar mass: 188.274 g·mol^{−1}
- 3D model (JSmol): Interactive image
- SMILES: [2H]C([2H])(C1=CNC2=CC=CC=C21)C([2H])([2H])N(C)C
- InChI: InChI=1S/C12H16N2/c1-14(2)8-7-10-9-13-12-6-4-3-5-11(10)12/h3-6,9,13H,7-8H2,1-2H3/i7D2,8D2; Key:DMULVCHRPCFFGV-OSEHSPPNSA-N

DMT-d4, or D_{4}DMT, also known as α,α,β,β-tetradeutero-DMT, is a serotonin receptor modulator and putative psychedelic drug of the tryptamine family related to dimethyltryptamine (DMT). It is the isotopologue of DMT in which the hydrogen atoms at the α and β positions have been replaced with the deuterium isotopes.

== Pharmacology ==
DMT-d4 is thought to be resistant to metabolism by monoamine oxidase (MAO) compared to DMT. Relatedly, D_{4}DMT, at the same dose, shows stronger effects, 2- to 3-fold higher brain levels, a longer duration, and a faster onset than DMT in rodents. In addition, DMT-d4, unlike DMT, might be orally active, though this remains to be studied. D_{4}DMT was said to have similar properties to the combination of DMT with a monoamine oxidase inhibitor (MAOI) in rodents. The metabolism and metabolites of DMT-d4 have been studied.

== Chemistry ==
=== Synthesis ===
The chemical synthesis of DMT-d4 has been described.

=== Analogues ===
A notable analogue of DMT-d4 is 5-MeO-DMT-d4. Other analogues of DMT-d4 include deuterated forms of tryptamine like α,α-dideuterotryptamine and β,β-dideuterotryptamine.

== History ==
DMT-d4 was first described in the scientific literature by 1982.

== See also ==
- Substituted tryptamine
- Deudimethyltryptamine
- Deupsilocin
- Ayahuasca
- Pharmahuasca
