= C13H15N3 =

The molecular formula C_{13}H_{15}N_{3} (molar mass: 213.28 g/mol) may refer to:

- Quipazine
- (R)-69
- N-(2-Cyanoethyl)tryptamine
