= N-(Ethoxycarbonyl)phenethylamine =

CAR-PEA

Clinical data
- Other names: CAR-PEA; N-Ethoxycarbonyl-PEA
- Drug class: Monoamine releasing agent; Stimulant
- ATC code: None

Identifiers
- IUPAC name: ethyl N-(2-phenylethyl)carbamate
- CAS Number: 6970-83-8
- PubChem CID: 247630
- ChemSpider: 216775
- ChEMBL: ChEMBL4521412

Chemical and physical data
- Formula: C_{11}H_{15}NO_{2}
- Molar mass: 193.246 g·mol^{−1}
- 3D model (JSmol): Interactive image
- SMILES: CCOC(=O)NCCC1=CC=CC=C1
- InChI: InChI=1S/C11H15NO2/c1-2-14-11(13)12-9-8-10-6-4-3-5-7-10/h3-7H,2,8-9H2,1H3,(H,12,13); Key:WXDDBYFBIIAYSM-UHFFFAOYSA-N

N-(Ethoxycarbonyl)phenethylamine (CAR-PEA) is a stimulant drug of the phenethylamine family related to phenethylamine (PEA). It is the N-(ethoxycarbonyl) derivative of phenethylamine and hence is a carbamate derivative of this compound. The drug is a prodrug of phenethylamine in rodents. It has been shown to elevate brain levels of phenethylamine when given via intraperitoneal injection. CAR-PEA was first described in the scientific literature by 1984. Analogous carbamate prodrugs of amphetamine and tranylcypromine have also been described.

== See also ==
- Substituted phenethylamine
- N-(2-Cyanoethyl)phenethylamine (CEPEA)
