= Alpha-D =

Clinical data
- Other names: α-D; α,α-Dideuteromescaline; 3,4,5-Trimethoxy-α,α-dideuterophenethylamine; α,α-Dideutero-3,4,5-trimethoxyphenethylamine
- Routes of administration: Oral
- Drug class: Serotonergic psychedelic; Hallucinogen
- ATC code: None

Pharmacokinetic data
- Onset of action: Unknown
- Duration of action: Unknown

Identifiers
- IUPAC name: 1,1-dideuterio-2-(3,4,5-trimethoxyphenyl)ethanamine
- PubChem CID: 168072778

Chemical and physical data
- Formula: C_{11}H_{17}NO_{3}
- Molar mass: 211.261 g·mol^{−1}
- 3D model (JSmol): Interactive image
- SMILES: [2H]C([2H])(CC1=CC(=C(C(=C1)OC)OC)OC)N
- InChI: InChI=1S/C11H17NO3/c1-13-9-6-8(4-5-12)7-10(14-2)11(9)15-3/h6-7H,4-5,12H2,1-3H3/i5D2; Key:RHCSKNNOAZULRK-BFWBPSQCSA-N

Alpha-D, or α-D, also known as 3,4,5-trimethoxy-α,α-dideuterophenethylamine or as α,α-dideuteromescaline, is a psychedelic drug of the phenethylamine and scaline families related to mescaline. It is the isotopologue of mescaline in which the two hydrogen atoms at the α position have been replaced with the deuterium isotopes.

According to Alexander Shulgin in his book PiHKAL (Phenethylamines I Have Known and Loved) and other publications, α-D had not yet been synthesized or tested, but would be expected to have similar properties and effects to those of mescaline. However, it would be expected to have reduced metabolism via deamination than mescaline, which may result in some degree of greater potency in comparison. Subsequently, Daniel Trachsel reported in his book Phenethylamine: von der Struktur zur Funktion (Phenethylamines: From Structure to Function), based on anonymous personal communication in 2009, that α-D is active at a dose of 230 mg orally, with substantial effects similar to those of a 320 mg dose of mescaline in the same subject. As such, α-D may be approximately one-third more potent than mescaline. This is consistent with approximately one-third of a dose of mescaline being excreted as the deaminated inactive metabolite 3,4,5-trimethoxyphenylacetic acid (TMPAA) in humans.

The chemical synthesis of α-D has been described. Analogues of α-D include β-D (beta-D; β,β-dideuteromescaline), α,β-D (alpha,beta-D; α,β-dideuteromescaline), and 4-D (4-trideuteromescaline), among others.

α-D was described by Shulgin in PiHKAL in 1991 and in subsequent publications. Later, Trachsel further described α-D and its properties in humans in 2013. The drug does not seem to be a controlled substance in Canada as of 2025.

== See also ==
- Scaline
- β-D (β,β-dideuteromescaline)
- α,β-D (α,β-dideuteromescaline)
- 4-D (4-trideuteromescaline)
- Deumescaline
- α,α-Dideuterophenethylamine
