= Beta-D =

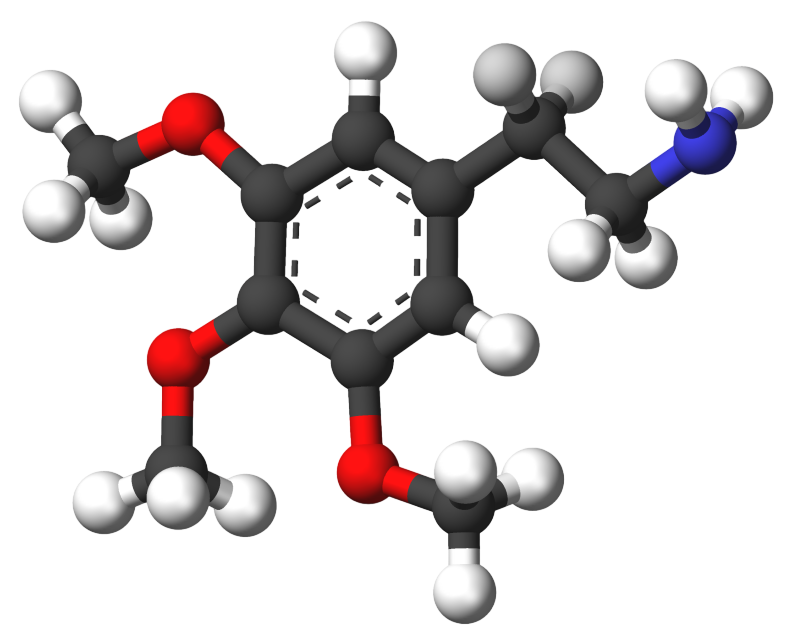

Clinical data
- Other names: β-D; β,β-Dideuteromescaline; 3,4,5-Trimethoxy-β,β-dideuterophenethylamine
- Routes of administration: Oral
- Drug class: Serotonergic psychedelic; Hallucinogen
- ATC code: None

Pharmacokinetic data
- Onset of action: 15 minutes–1.5 hours
- Duration of action: 12 hours

Identifiers
- IUPAC name: 2-(3,4,5-trimethoxyphenyl)(2,2-^{2}H_{2})ethan-1-amine
- CAS Number: 1020518-89-1
- PubChem CID: 44719547
- ChemSpider: 21106267
- UNII: UP9QBW4UM9
- CompTox Dashboard (EPA): DTXSID00660360

Chemical and physical data
- Formula: C_{11}H_{15}D_{2}NO_{3}
- Molar mass: 213.272 g·mol^{−1}
- 3D model (JSmol): Interactive image
- SMILES: COc1c(cc(cc1OC)C([2H])([2H])CN)OC
- InChI: InChI=1S/C11H17NO3/c1-13-9-6-8(4-5-12)7-10(14-2)11(9)15-3/h6-7H,4-5,12H2,1-3H3/i4D2; Key:RHCSKNNOAZULRK-APZFVMQVSA-N

Beta-D, or β-D, also known as 3,4,5-trimethoxy-β,β-dideuterophenethylamine or as β,β-dideuteromescaline, is a psychedelic drug of the scaline family related to mescaline. It is the isotopologue of mescaline in which the two hydrogen atoms at the β position have been replaced with the deuterium isotopes.

In his book PiHKAL (Phenethylamines I Have Known and Loved) and other publications, Alexander Shulgin lists β-D's dose as 200 to 400 mg orally in the case of the sulfate salt or 178 to 356 mg orally in the case of the hydrochloride salt and its duration as 12 hours. The onset ranged from 15 minutes to 1.5 hours. The drug produces hallucinogenic effects similarly to mescaline, with these effects of β-D having been thoroughly described. It is thought to be very similar or indistinguishable in terms of properties, effects, and metabolism compared to mescaline.

The effects of β-D have specifically been reported to include closed-eye visuals, psychedelic visuals, feeling out of one's body, feeling more or less aware of one's body, feeling light, introspection, insights, pleasantness, feeling powerful, religious feelings and connection, and musical enhancement and absorption. Other effects included stomach squeamishness, no nausea to extreme nausea as well as vomiting, and paranoia. Some commented that it was a "magnificent experience—one of the best" and that it was an "earth-shaking experience".

The chemical synthesis of β-D has been described. Other deuterated isotopologues of mescaline are also known, such as 4-D (4-trideuteromescaline), α-D (alpha-D; α,α-dideuteromescaline), and α,β-D (alpha,beta-D; α,β-dideuteromescaline), among others. α-D may be resistant to the oxidative deamination that is known to occur with mescaline, which may result in it being more potent than mescaline. However, α-D is not known to have been studied.

β-D was described by Shulgin in his book PiHKAL in 1991. It does not seem to be a controlled substance in Canada as of 2025.

== See also ==
- Scaline
- α-D (α,α-dideuteromescaline)
- α,β-D (α,β-dideuteromescaline)
- 4-D (4-trideuteromescaline)
- Deumescaline
