= Deumescaline =

Deumescaline, or deuterated mescaline, is a deuterated form of mescaline and may refer to:

- Alpha-D (α-D; α,α-dideuteromescaline)
- Beta-D (β-D; β,β-dideuteromescaline)
- Alpha,Beta-D (α,β-D; α,β-dideuteromescaline)
- 4-D (4-trideuteromescaline)
- 2,6-D (2,6-dideuteromescaline)
- 3,5-D (3,5-di(trideutero)mescaline)

== See also ==
- Deudimethyltryptamine
- Deupsilocin
- CYB005
- d2-MDMA
