= Α,α-Dideuterophenethylamine =

α,α-Dideuterophenethylamine

Clinical data
- Other names: α,α-Dideutero-phenethylamine; α,α-Dideutero-2-phenylethylamine; PE-α,α-d2; D2PE
- Drug class: Monoamine releasing agent
- ATC code: None

Identifiers
- IUPAC name: 1,1-dideuterio-2-phenylethanamine
- PubChem CID: 53682035

Chemical and physical data
- Formula: C_{8}H_{11}N
- Molar mass: 121.183 g·mol^{−1}
- 3D model (JSmol): Interactive image
- SMILES: [2H]C([2H])(CC1=CC=CC=C1)N
- InChI: InChI=1S/C8H11N/c9-7-6-8-4-2-1-3-5-8/h1-5H,6-7,9H2/i7D2; Key:BHHGXPLMPWCGHP-RJSZUWSASA-N

α,α-Dideuterophenethylamine, also known as PE-α,α-d2 or D2PE, is a deuterated isotopologue of phenethylamine. It is the analogue of phenethylamine in which the two hydrogen atoms at the α position have been replaced with the deuterium isotopes.

== Pharmacology ==
α,α-Dideuterophenethylamine showed considerably reduced deamination by monoamine oxidase (MAO) compared to phenethylamine in vitro. Conversely, β,β-dideuterophenethylamine was not resistant to metabolism by MAO relative to phenethylamine in vitro. Similarly, levels of α,α-dideuterophenethylamine were 16-fold higher in the brain, 2.4-fold higher in the liver, and 4.3-fold higher in plasma than levels of phenethylamine after 30 minutes when both drugs were administered via intraperitoneal injection in rodents. In contrast, β,β-dideuterophenethylamine showed no differences from phenethylamine in such regards.

On the other hand, another deuterated isotopologue of phenethylamine, α,α,β,β-tetradeuterophenethylamine, showed brain levels that were 10-fold higher than those of phenethylamine after 30 minutes and 67-fold higher than phenethylamine after 60 minutes in rodents, whereas levels were no longer different between the two drugs at 120 minutes (i.e., 1.0 ratio). Likewise, α,α,β,β-tetradeuterophenethylamine showed enhanced levels in the liver and plasma compared to phenethylamine, albeit to a much lesser extent of only 3- to 4-fold. The differences in levels of α,α,β,β-tetradeuterophenethylamine versus phenethylamine in the brain were markedly reduced by pretreatment with the monoamine oxidase inhibitor (MAOI) pargyline, for instance diminishing them at 60 minutes from 67-fold to only 11-fold. These findings suggest that reduced metabolism by MAO was largely but not fully responsible for the enhanced levels of α,α,β,β-tetradeuterophenethylamine compared to phenethylamine, although it was noted that MAO inhibition by pargyline was probably incomplete and hence could also have been involved.

Like phenethylamine, α,α-dideuterophenethylamine has been found to be a dopamine releasing agent in rodents in vivo, but given at the same dose, showed greater magnitude of effect and longer-lasting effects. α,α-Dideuterophenethylamine fully substituted for phenethylamine in rodent drug discrimination tests, with about 1.5- to 2.2-fold greater potency in comparison. The related deuterated isotopologue α,α,β,β-tetradeuterophenethylamine has also been studied in terms of behavioral effects in rodents and was found to produce greater intensity and duration of hyperlocomotion than phenethylamine when given at the same dose. Its duration was extended by 33% compared to phenethylamine.

The urinary excretion of "phenylethylamine-d2" (deuteration specifics not described) in a human male has been studied. It was given as a single 500 mg dose orally. The effects of the drug were not described.

== History ==
α,α-Dideuterophenethylamine was first described in the scientific literature by 1981. It was then further studied and described throughout the rest of the 1980s. α,α,β,β-Tetradeuterophenethylamine was likewise studied and described in the 1980s.

== See also ==
- Substituted phenethylamine
- α,α-Dideuterotryptamine
- α,α-Dideuteromescaline
- HLP005 (likely deuterated 2C-T-36)
- d2-MDMA
- N-(2-Cyanoethyl)phenethylamine (CEPEA or CE-PEA)
