= Phenacyl bromide =

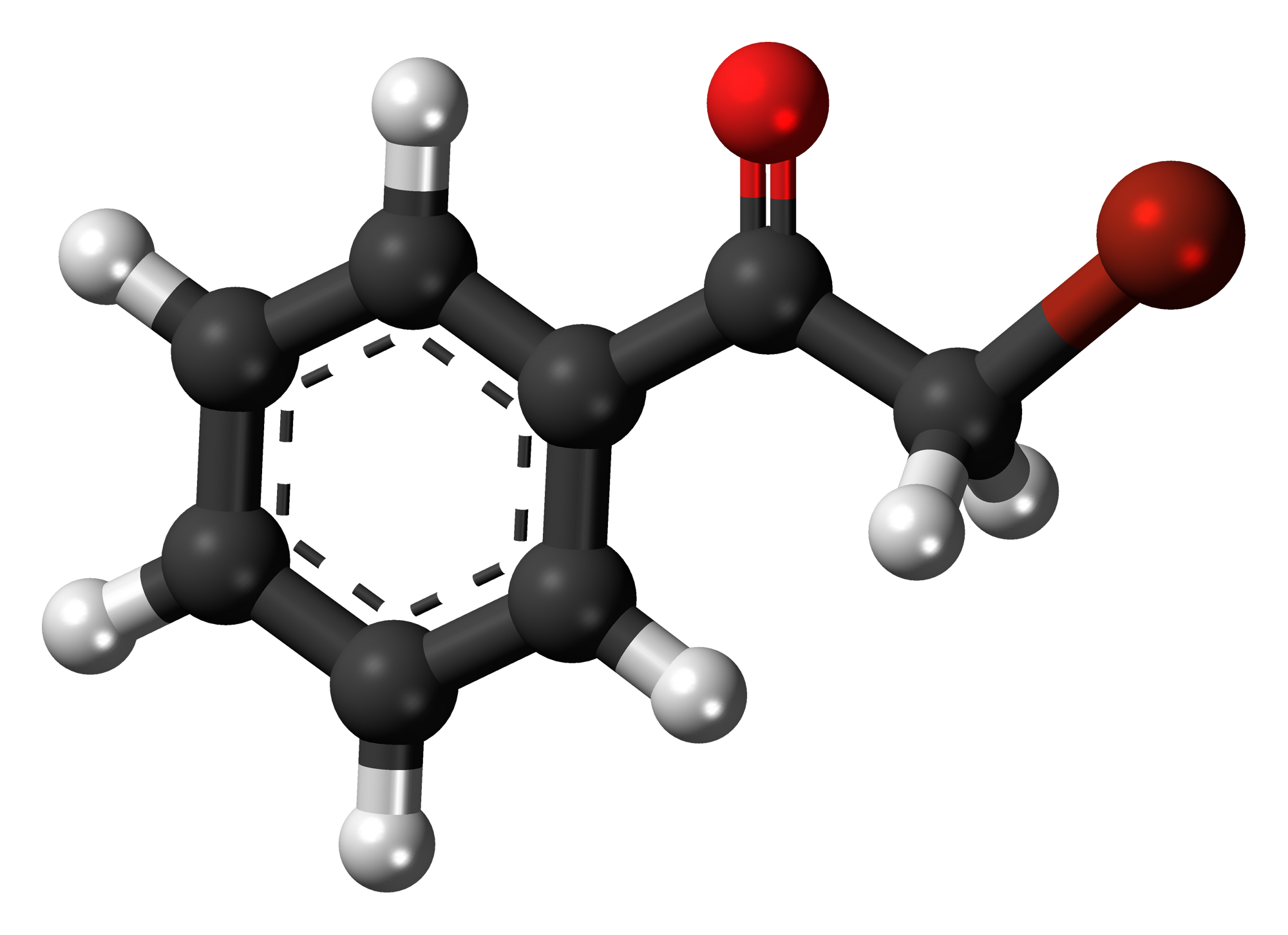

Names
- Preferred IUPAC name 2-Bromo-1-phenylethan-1-one
- Other names 2-Bromo-1-phenylethanone; 2-Bromoacetophenone α-Bromoacetophenone; Bromomethyl phenyl ketone

Identifiers
CAS Number	70-11-1
3D model (JSmol)	Interactive image
ChEBI	CHEBI:51846
ChEMBL	ChEMBL102953
ChemSpider	6023
ECHA InfoCard	100.000.659
PubChem CID	6259
UNII	754Y0U325I
CompTox Dashboard (EPA)	DTXSID2049426
- InChI: InChI=1S/C8H7BrO/c9-6-8(10)7-4-2-1-3-5-7/h1-5H,6H2 Key: LIGACIXOYTUXAW-UHFFFAOYSA-N; InChI=1/C8H7BrO/c9-6-8(10)7-4-2-1-3-5-7/h1-5H,6H2 Key: LIGACIXOYTUXAW-UHFFFAOYAV
- SMILES: O=C(c1ccccc1)CBr

Properties
Chemical formula	C_{8}H_{7}BrO
Molar mass	199.047 g·mol^{−1}
Appearance	Colorless solid
Melting point	50 °C (122 °F; 323 K)
Boiling point	136 °C (277 °F; 409 K) 18 mm Hg

Hazards
- Occupational safety and health (OHS/OSH)
Main hazards	Toxic(T)
- Except where otherwise noted, data are given for materials in their standard state (at 25 °C [77 °F], 100 kPa). verify (what is ?) Infobox references

Phenacyl bromide is the organic compound with the formula C_{6}H_{5}C(O)CH_{2}Br. This colourless solid is a powerful lachrymator as well as a useful precursor to other organic compounds.

It is prepared by bromination of acetophenone:

C_{6}H_{5}C(O)CH_{3} + Br_{2} → C_{6}H_{5}C(O)CH_{2}Br + HBr

The compound was first reported in 1871.

== Applications ==
Some of the known applications of phenacyl bromide include the following list of agents: Levamisole, Solpecainol, Fanetizole, Nomifensine, Fendosal (page 170), Trepipam, Furaprofen, Hexocyclium.
