= Helus Pharma =

Canadian pharmaceutical company

- Industry: Pharmaceutical; Psychedelic medicine
- Founded: 2019; 7 years ago
- Headquarters: Toronto, Canada
- Website: www.helus.com

Helus Pharma, also known formerly as Cybin IRL, is a Canadian pharmaceutical company that was led by CEO Doug Drysdale from 2020-2025, developing psychedelic drugs as medicines.

The company's drug candidates include psilocybin (HLP001; CYB001), HLP002 (CYB002; discontinued), deupsilocin (HLP003; CYB003; psilocin-d10; deuterated psilocin), deudimethyltryptamine (HLP004; CYB004; DMT-d10; deuterated dimethyltryptamine (DMT)), HLP005 (CYB005; deuterated phenethylamine derivative), and HLP006 (CYB006). Another drug that the company has developed is CYB210010 (2C-T-TFM).

As of January 2025, deupsilocin is in phase 3 clinical trials. The drug is one of the only other psychedelics besides Compass Pathways's COMP360 (psilocybin) to have reached this late stage of clinical development.

In 2020, Helus Pharma acquired psychedelic pharmaceutical company Adelia Therapeutics. In late 2023, it acquired Small Pharma, the developer of SPL026 (DMT) and SPL028 (D_{2}-DMT). Helus Pharma was originally known as Cybin but changed its name in December 2025.

== Clinical programs ==
=== Deupsilocin (HLP003) ===
Deupsilocin (HLP003; psilocin-d10) is a deuterated oral formulation of psilocin, the active metabolite of psilocybin. Unlike psilocybin, deupsilocin bypasses the first metabolic step (dephosphorylation), which the company reports results in higher drug delivery efficiency, with studies showing approximately 2x higher C_{max} and 3.5x greater AUC compared to equivalent doses of psilocybin. The drug has a reported duration of acute subjective effects of approximately 4–6 hours, with onset within 15 minutes of dosing.

Deupsilocin has been granted Breakthrough Therapy Designation by the U.S. Food and Drug Administration for the adjunctive treatment of major depressive disorder (MDD). As of early 2026, it is in Phase 3 clinical trials as part of the PARADIGM program, which comprises three studies: APPROACH (a two-arm study of two 16 mg doses vs. placebo, n=220), EMBRACE (a three-arm study comparing two dose levels and placebo, n=330), and EXTEND (a long-term extension study to assess durability and redosing). The multinational program includes more than 100 sites across the United States, Europe and Australia. Topline efficacy data from the APPROACH study is anticipated in Q4 2026.

In Phase 2 trials, two doses of deupsilocin 16 mg resulted in 100% of patients being classified as responders and 71% achieving remission at 12 months, with a mean approximately 23-point reduction in Montgomery–Åsberg Depression Rating Scale (MADRS) scores from baseline. All reported adverse events were mild to moderate, with no adverse events of suicidality and no serious adverse events reported during the 12-month follow-up.

=== Deudimethyltryptamine (HLP004) ===
Deudimethyltryptamine (HLP004; DMT-d10) is a deuterated dimethyltryptamine (DMT) formulation administered intramuscularly, being developed for the treatment of generalized anxiety disorder (GAD). Deuteration extends the duration of DMT's effects relative to intravenous DMT, while intramuscular administration allows for patient discharge readiness within approximately 3 hours.

In Q1 2026, Helus reported positive Phase 2 topline data from a signal-detection study of deudimethyltryptamine as an adjunctive treatment for moderate-to-severe GAD. Both active dose levels (2 mg and 20 mg) demonstrated a statistically significant approximately 10-point reduction in Hamilton Anxiety Rating Scale (HAM-A) scores from baseline at 6 weeks (p<0.0001), with effects seen as early as Day 2 and sustained through at least 6 months. Approximately 70% of patients were responders and approximately 40% achieved remission at 6 months following a single treatment cycle of two doses. All adverse events were mild to moderate, and no drug-related serious adverse events or suicidality signals were recorded.

== Leadership ==
=== Executive team ===
As of early 2026, Helus Pharma is led by Chief Executive Officer Michael Cola and Executive Chairman and Co-Founder Eric So. Other members of the senior leadership team include Chief Medical Officer Amir Inamdar (MBBS, DNB(Psych), FFPM), Chief Scientific Officer Alex Nivorozhkin (Ph.D.), Chief Operating Officer Aaron Bartlone, Chief Business Officer George Tziras, and Co-Founder and Chief Growth Officer Paul Glavine. The company was previously led by CEO Doug Drysdale from 2020 to 2025.

=== Scientific advisory board ===
The company's scientific advisory board includes Robert Langer, Institute Professor at the Massachusetts Institute of Technology and co-founder of Moderna; Maurizio Fava, Chair of the Department of Psychiatry at Mass General Brigham and Massachusetts General Hospital; Thomas Laughren, former Director of the FDA's Division of Psychiatry Products; Freda Lewis-Hall, former Chief Medical Officer and Chief Patient Officer of Pfizer; Steve Brannan, former Chief Medical Officer of Karuna Therapeutics; and Andrew J. Cutler, a psychiatrist and principal investigator with experience across more than 400 clinical trials.

== See also ==
- List of psychedelic pharmaceutical companies
- List of investigational hallucinogens and entactogens
