= N-(2-Cyanoethyl)phenethylamine =

CEPEA

Clinical data
- Other names: N-Cyanoethylphenethylamine; CEPEA; CE-PEA; α-Desmethylfenproporex; α-Desmethyl-fenproporex; PEA-P
- Drug class: Monoamine releasing agent; Stimulant
- ATC code: None

Identifiers
- IUPAC name: 3-(2-phenylethylamino)propanenitrile
- CAS Number: 1488-20-6
- PubChem CID: 3155309
- ChemSpider: 2407300

Chemical and physical data
- Formula: C_{11}H_{14}N_{2}
- Molar mass: 174.247 g·mol^{−1}
- 3D model (JSmol): Interactive image
- SMILES: C1=CC=C(C=C1)CCNCCC#N
- InChI: InChI=1S/C11H14N2/c12-8-4-9-13-10-7-11-5-2-1-3-6-11/h1-3,5-6,13H,4,7,9-10H2; Key:LVHAIJJWSYXSLW-UHFFFAOYSA-N

N-(2-Cyanoethyl)phenethylamine (CEPEA) is a stimulant drug of the phenethylamine family related to phenethylamine (PEA). It is the N-(2-cyanoethyl) derivative of phenethylamine.

The drug acts as a prodrug of phenethylamine and hence is a monoamine releasing agent similarly. It shows greatly sustained phenethylamine levels and neurochemical effects in rodents compared to phenethylamine itself however. As an example, the elimination half-life of phenethylamine was 1.1 minutes whereas the half-life of CEPEA was 27 minutes. Total exposure to phenethylamine with CEPEA in blood and brain was no greater than with phenethylamine itself in rodents, but exposure to phenethylamine with CEPEA was much greater in the liver than with phenethylamine itself.

The chemical synthesis of CEPEA has been described. Analogues of CEPEA include fenproporex (α-methyl-CEPEA or N-(2-cyanoethyl)amphetamine) and N-(2-cyanoethyl)tranylcypromine (CE-TCP). Another notable analogue of CEPEA is N-(ethoxycarbonyl)phenethylamine (CAR-PEA), which is a prodrug of phenethylamine similarly to CEPEA. Other phenethylamine prodrugs have been described as well.

CEPEA was first described in the scientific literature by 1985.

== See also ==
- Substituted phenethylamine
- α,α-Dideuterophenethylamine
- Fenproporex (N-(2-cyanoethyl)amphetamine)
- N-(Ethoxycarbonyl)phenethylamine (CAR-PEA)
- N-(2-Cyanoethyl)tryptamine (CE-T or CET)
