= Fanetizole =

Chemical compound

Clinical data
- Other names: CP-48,810

Pharmacokinetic data
- Protein binding: %

Identifiers
- IUPAC name: 4-Phenyl-N-(2-phenylethyl)-1,3-thiazol-2-amine
- CAS Number: 79069-94-6
- PubChem CID: 54339
- ChemSpider: 49083
- UNII: BH48F620JA
- CompTox Dashboard (EPA): DTXSID9048695

Chemical and physical data
- Formula: C_{17}H_{16}N_{2}S
- Molar mass: 280.39 g·mol^{−1}
- 3D model (JSmol): Interactive image
- SMILES: n1c(csc1NCCc2ccccc2)c3ccccc3
- InChI: InChI=1S/C17H16N2S/c1-3-7-14(8-4-1)11-12-18-17-19-16(13-20-17)15-9-5-2-6-10-15/h1-10,13H,11-12H2,(H,18,19); Key:WEEYMMXMBFJUAI-UHFFFAOYSA-N

Fanetizole is a drug that has immunoregulating activity.

== Synthesis ==
Reaction of β-phenethylamine (1) with ammonium thiocyanate (2) gives the thiourea (3). Treatment of that product with phenacyl bromide (4) produces fanetizole (5).

Other syntheses:
