= Deudimethyltryptamine =

Serotonergic psychedelic

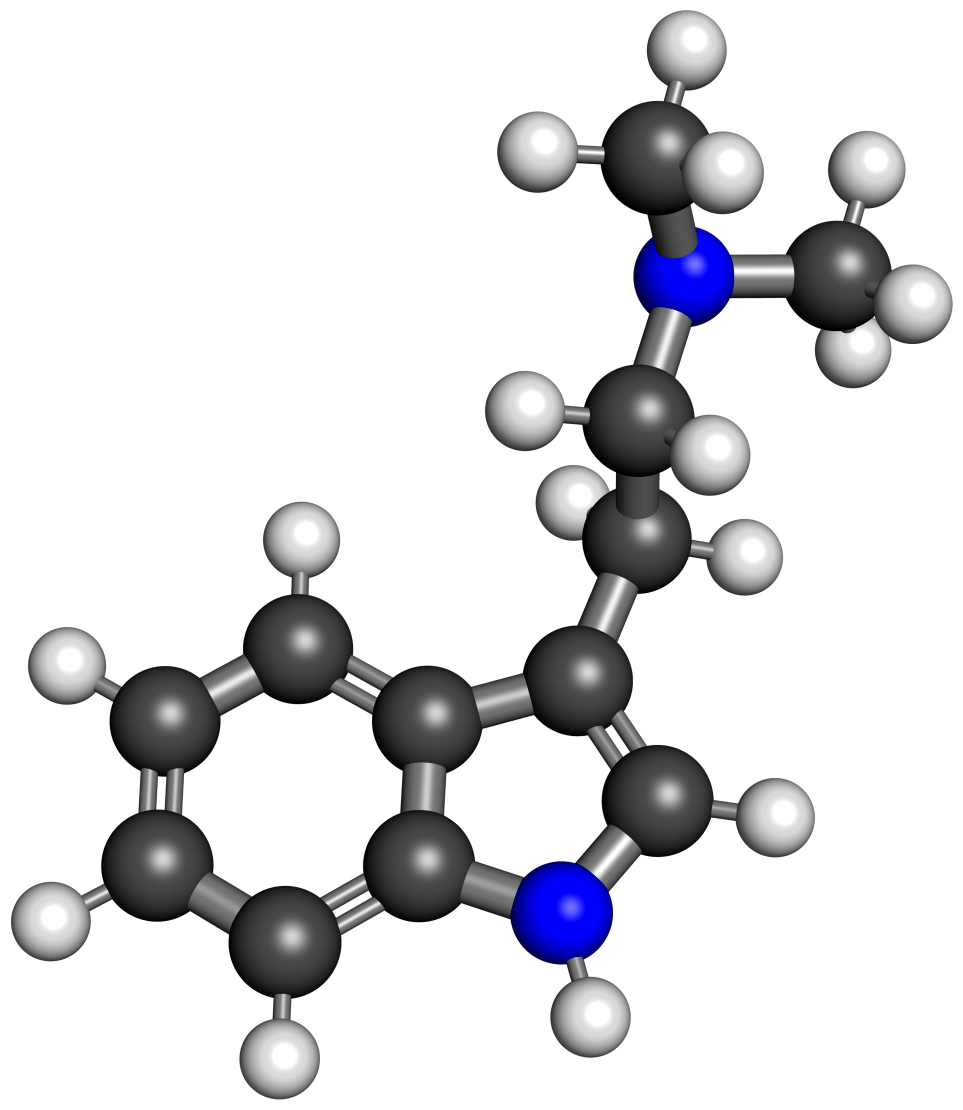

Clinical data
- Other names: HLP004; HLP-004; CYB004; CYB-004; Deuterated dimethyltryptamine; Deuterated DMT; dDMT; D-DMT; DMT-d10; Decadeutero-DMT
- Routes of administration: Inhalation, intravenous
- Drug class: Serotonergic psychedelic; Serotonin receptor agonist

Pharmacokinetic data
- Elimination half-life: 37–40 minutes
- Duration of action: ~40 minutes

Identifiers
- IUPAC name: 1,1,2,2-tetradeuterio-2-(1H-indol-3-yl)-N,N-bis(trideuteriomethyl)ethanamine
- CAS Number: 2742678-60-8
- PubChem CID: 167379785
- UNII: M6Z3FT2DQ7

Chemical and physical data
- Formula: C_{12}H_{16}N_{2}
- Molar mass: 188.274 g·mol^{−1}
- 3D model (JSmol): Interactive image
- SMILES: [2H]C([2H])([2H])N(C([2H])([2H])[2H])C([2H])([2H])C([2H])([2H])C1=CNC2=CC=CC=C21
- InChI: InChI=1S/C12H16N2/c1-14(2)8-7-10-9-13-12-6-4-3-5-11(10)12/h3-6,9,13H,7-8H2,1-2H3/i1D3,2D3,7D2,8D2; Key:DMULVCHRPCFFGV-TXNVYZHYSA-N

Deudimethyltryptamine (INN; developmental code names HLP004 and CYB004), also known as deuterated dimethyltryptamine (dDMT) or as DMT-d10, is a psychedelic drug of the tryptamine family related to dimethyltryptamine (DMT) which is under development for the treatment of generalized anxiety disorder, anxiety disorders, and depressive disorders. It is administered by inhalation or intravenous injection. The drug is a deuterated isotopologue of DMT with altered pharmacokinetics.

== Pharmacology ==
The pharmacodynamic profile of deudimethyltryptamine, including its interactions with serotonin receptors and its effects in animals, is similar to that of DMT. As with DMT, deudimethyltryptamine is a potent agonist of the serotonin 5-HT_{2A} receptor and produces psychedelic-like effects in animals. However, deudimethyltryptamine, due to its deuteration, is more resistant to metabolism than DMT and shows a longer elimination half-life (by 2.5- to 2.9-fold) and slower clearance (by 38 to 55%) in animals. The brain to plasma ratio of deudimethyltryptamine was also increased (by 30%) relative to DMT, indicating slightly greater central permeability as well.

The pharmacokinetics and effects of deudimethyltryptamine in humans have been studied and compared with those of DMT. Its elimination half-life was 37 to 40 minutes and its duration was approximately 40 minutes. For comparison, the half-life of DMT in humans has been reported to be 9 to 12 minutes (range 5–19 minutes). Deudimethyltryptamine produced more robust psychedelic effects than DMT at lower concentrations. Additional details on the pharmacokinetics of deudimethyltryptamine in humans have also been reported.

Pharmacokinetics of deudimethyltryptamine in humans
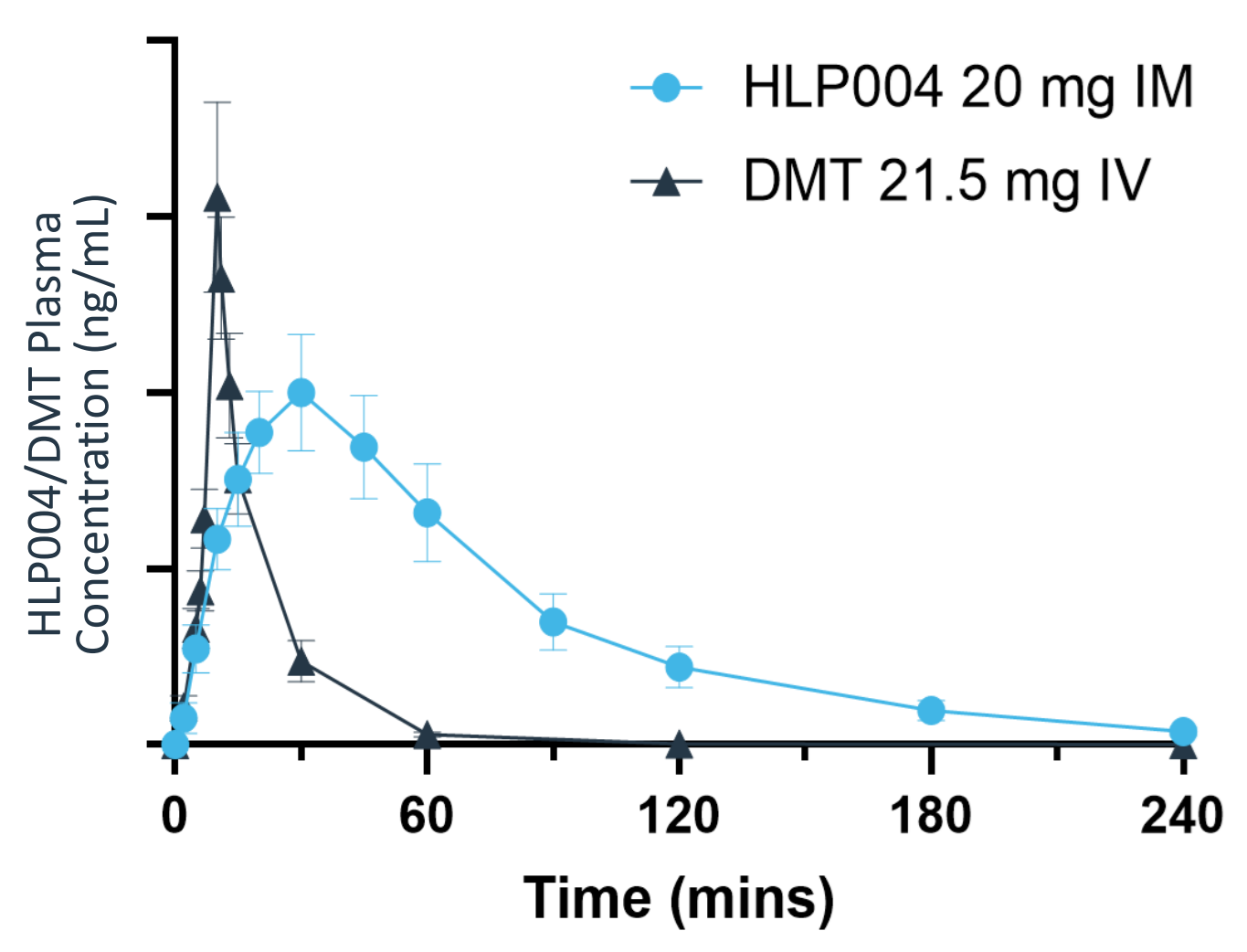
Levels of deudimethyltryptamine i.m. versus DMT i.v.

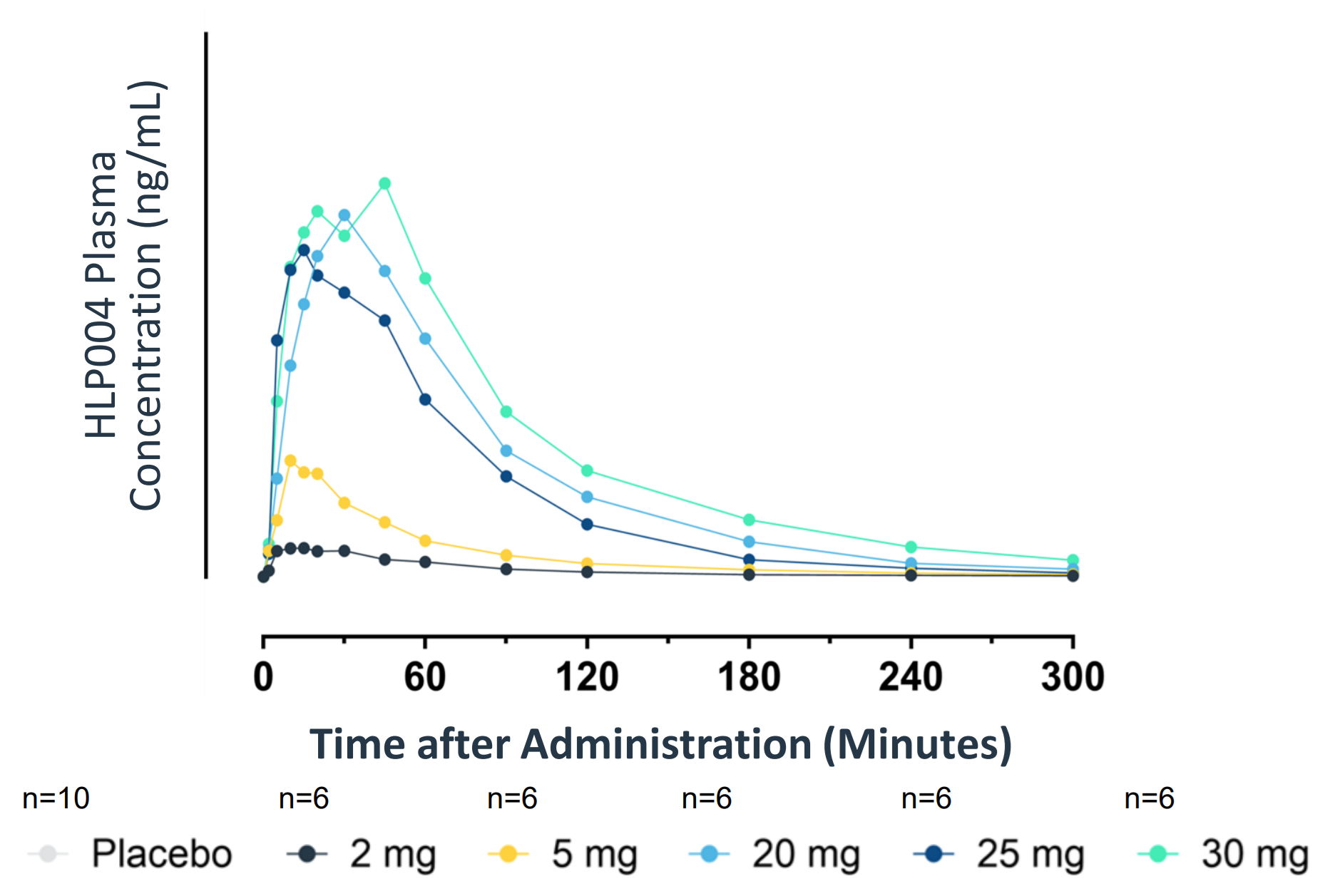
Levels of deudimethyltryptamine at doses of 2 to 30 mg i.m.

== Chemistry ==
=== Analogues ===
Other deuterated drugs related to deudimethyltryptamine or DMT-d_{10} include the deuterated DMT analogue SPL028 (D_{2}-DMT; α,α-dideutero-DMT), the deuterated psilocin analogue deupsilocin (HLP003; CYB003; d_{10}-psilocin), and the deuterated phenethylamine HLP005 (CYB005).

== Research ==
Deudimethyltryptamine is under development by Helus Pharma (formerly Cybin). It is under development for the treatment of generalized anxiety disorder, anxiety disorders, and depressive disorders. As of July 2026, deudimethyltryptamine is in phase 2 clinical trials for generalized anxiety disorder and phase 1 trials for anxiety disorders and depressive disorders. It was also under development for the treatment of substance-related disorders and other psychiatric disorders, but development for these indications was discontinued.

== See also ==
- Substituted tryptamine
- List of investigational hallucinogens and entactogens
- List of investigational anxiolytics
- List of investigational antidepressants
- SPL028 (D_{2}-DMT; α,α-dideutero-DMT)
- Deuterated 5-MeO-DMT
- α,α-Dideuterotryptamine
