= 4-D (psychedelic) =

Clinical data
- Other names: Mescaline-D3; Mescaline-d3; 4-Trideuteromescaline; 4-Trideuteromethoxy-3,5-methoxyphenethylamine; 3,5-Dimethoxy-4-trideuteromethoxyphenethylamine
- Routes of administration: Oral
- Drug class: Serotonergic psychedelic; Hallucinogen
- ATC code: None

Pharmacokinetic data
- Onset of action: 20 minutes–~1 hour
- Duration of action: 12 hours

Identifiers
- IUPAC name: 1-[3,5-dimethoxy-4-(^{2}H_{3})methoxyphenyl]propan-2-amine
- CAS Number: 1020518-87-9
- PubChem CID: 44719545
- ChemSpider: 23553050
- UNII: 46N9S93HNE

Chemical and physical data
- Formula: C_{11}H_{14}D_{3}NO_{3}
- Molar mass: 214.278 g·mol^{−1}
- 3D model (JSmol): Interactive image
- SMILES: [2H]C([2H])([2H])OC1=C(OC)C=C(CCN)C=C1OC
- InChI: InChI=1S/C11H17NO3/c1-13-9-6-8(4-5-12)7-10(14-2)11(9)15-3/h6-7H,4-5,12H2,1-3H3/i3D3; Key:RHCSKNNOAZULRK-HPRDVNIFSA-N

4-D, also known as 4-trideuteromethoxy-3,5-methoxyphenethylamine or as 4-trideuteromescaline, is a psychedelic drug of the scaline family related to mescaline. It is the isotopologue of mescaline in which the three hydrogen atoms of the methoxy group at the 4 position have been replaced with the deuterium isotopes.

In his book PiHKAL (Phenethylamines I Have Known and Loved) and other publications, Alexander Shulgin lists 4-D's dose as 200 to 400 mg orally in the case of the sulfate salt or 178 to 356 mg orally in the case of the hydrochloride salt and its duration as 12 hours. The onset ranged from 20 minutes to about 1 hour. The drug produces hallucinogenic effects similarly to mescaline, with these effects of 4-D having been thoroughly described. It is thought to be very similar or indistinguishable in terms of properties, effects, and metabolism compared to mescaline.

The effects of 4-D have specifically been reported to include visual enhancement and sharpening, closed-eye visuals, very little open-eye visuals, some movement and flow of objects, "color show", objects changing color in wave-like manner, color distortion, pleasantness, good energy and communication, calmness or detachment, and quickening of thought and verbal flow. Other effects included slight queasiness or "pre-nausea", considerable nausea, stomach uneasiness, pupil dilation, cold hands and feet, element of confusion, and no physical instability.

The chemical synthesis of 4-D has been described. Other deuterated isotopologues of mescaline are also known, such as β-D (β,β-dideuteromescaline) and α-D (alpha-D; α,α-dideuteromescaline), among others. α-D may be resistant to the oxidative deamination that is known to occur with mescaline, which may result in it being more potent than mescaline. However, α-D is not known to have been studied.

4-D was described by Shulgin in his book PiHKAL in 1991. It does not seem to be a controlled substance in Canada as of 2025.

== See also ==
- Scaline
- α-D (α,α-dideuteromescaline)
- β-D (β,β-dideuteromescaline)
- Deumescaline
- 2CB-2OCD_{3} (2-trideuteromethoxy-2C-B)
- 2CB-5OCD_{3} (5-trideuteromethoxy-2C-B)
- d2-MDMA
