= N-(2-Cyanoethyl)tryptamine =

Clinical data
- Other names: N-2-Cyanoethyltryptamine; N-Cyanoethyltryptamine; CE-T; CET
- Drug class: Serotonin receptor agonist; Monoamine releasing agent
- ATC code: None

Identifiers
- IUPAC name: 3-[2-(1H-indol-3-yl)ethylamino]propanenitrile
- CAS Number: 105115-85-3
- PubChem CID: 53876738
- ChemSpider: 28686048

Chemical and physical data
- Formula: C_{13}H_{15}N_{3}
- Molar mass: 213.284 g·mol^{−1}
- 3D model (JSmol): Interactive image
- SMILES: C1=CC=C2C(=C1)C(=CN2)CCNCCC#N
- InChI: InChI=1S/C13H15N3/c14-7-3-8-15-9-6-11-10-16-13-5-2-1-4-12(11)13/h1-2,4-5,10,15-16H,3,6,8-9H2; Key:HGYHTHWLJDVNPB-UHFFFAOYSA-N

N-(2-Cyanoethyl)tryptamine (CE-T) is a serotonin receptor modulator and possible psychedelic drug of the tryptamine family related to tryptamine (T). It is the N-(2-cyanoethyl) derivative of tryptamine.

The drug acts as a prodrug of tryptamine and hence is a non-selective serotonin receptor agonist and monoamine releasing agent similarly. It shows greatly sustained tryptamine levels and neurochemical effects in rodents compared to tryptamine itself however. Peak levels of tryptamine with CE-T in the brain were lower than tryptamine itself, whereas total exposure to tryptamine with CE-T in the brain was no different than with tryptamine itself in rodents. CE-T alters brain serotonin and dopamine levels similarly to tryptamine, whereas both drugs have limited effects on brain norepinephrine levels. It produces hypolocomotion in rodents similarly to the combination of tryptamine with a monoamine oxidase inhibitor (MAOI). However, whereas tryptamine was unable to produce hypolocomotion without an MAOI, CE-T showed hypolocomotion regardless of whether the MAOI clorgiline was co-administered.

CE-T was first described in the scientific literature by 1985.

== See also ==
- Substituted tryptamine
- N-(2-Cyanoethyl)phenethylamine (CEPEA or CE-PEA)
- Fenproporex (N-(2-cyanoethyl)amphetamine)
- N-Phosphonooxymethyl-DMT (N-POM-DMT)
