= 2CB-5OCD3 =

2CB-5OCD_{3}

Clinical data
- Other names: 2C-B-5-OCD_{3}; 5-Trideuteromethoxy-2C-B; 4-Bromo-2-methoxy-5-trideuteromethoxyphenethylamine; 2-(4-Bromo-2-methoxy-5-(methoxy-d3)phenyl)ethan-1-amine
- Drug class: Serotonin 5-HT_{2A} receptor agonist; Possible serotonergic psychedelic or hallucinogen
- ATC code: None

Identifiers
- IUPAC name: 2-[4-bromo-2-methoxy-5-(trideuteriomethoxy)phenyl]ethanamine
- PubChem CID: 167477089

Chemical and physical data
- Formula: C_{10}H_{14}BrNO_{2}
- Molar mass: 260.131 g·mol^{−1}
- 3D model (JSmol): Interactive image
- SMILES: [2H]C([2H])([2H])OC1=C(C=C(C(=C1)CCN)OC)Br
- InChI: InChI=1S/C10H14BrNO2/c1-13-9-6-8(11)10(14-2)5-7(9)3-4-12/h5-6H,3-4,12H2,1-2H3/i2D3; Key:YMHOBZXQZVXHBM-BMSJAHLVSA-N

2CB-5OCD_{3}, also known as 5-trideuteromethoxy-2C-B, is a serotonin 5-HT_{2A} receptor agonist and possible psychedelic drug of the phenethylamine and 2C families. It is the isotopologue of 2C-B in which the three hydrogen atoms of the methoxy group at the 5 position have been replaced with the deuterium isotopes. The drug shows similar serotonin 5-HT_{2A} receptor pharmacodynamics and metabolism as 2C-B in vitro. The chemical synthesis of 2CB-5OCD_{3} has been described. 2CB-5OCD_{3} was developed by Nicholas V. Cozzi and Paul F. Daley of the Alexander Shulgin Research Institute (ASRI). It was patented in 2024 and was first described in the scientific literature in 2026.

== See also ==
- 2C (psychedelics)
- 2CB-2OCD_{3} (2-trideuteromethoxy-2C-B)
- 4-D (4-trideuteromescaline)
