= Topaquinone =

Names
- IUPAC name (2S)-2-Amino-3-(4-hydroxy-3,6-dioxocyclohexa-1,4-dien-1-yl)propanoic acid
- Other names 6-Hydroxydopaquinone

Identifiers
CAS Number	64192-68-3
3D model (JSmol)	Interactive image
ChEBI	CHEBI:36076
ChemSpider	110408
DrugBank	DB04334
PubChem CID	123871
UNII	PAG3GKA51Y
CompTox Dashboard (EPA)	DTXSID40982735
- InChI: InChI=1S/C9H9NO5/c10-5(9(14)15)1-4-2-7(12)8(13)3-6(4)11/h2-3,5,11H,1,10H2,(H,14,15)/t5-/m0/s1 Key: YWRFBISQAMHSIX-YFKPBYRVSA-N
- SMILES: C1=C(C(=CC(=O)C1=O)O)C[C@@H](C(=O)O)N

Properties
Chemical formula	C_{9}H_{9}NO_{5}
Molar mass	211.173 g·mol^{−1}
- Except where otherwise noted, data are given for materials in their standard state (at 25 °C [77 °F], 100 kPa). Infobox references

Topaquinone (TPQ) is a redox cofactor derived from the amino acid tyrosine. Its name derives from 2,4,5-trihydroxyphenylalanine-quinone. Its structure was first identified in 1990. It is used by copper amine oxidases which contain a tyrosine residue near the active site. This residue catalyses its own transition, first to dopaquinone and then to topaquinone, in a Cu^{2+} dependent manner.
