= Fenproporex =

Stimulant drug used to treat obesity

Clinical data
- Trade names: Perphoxene
- Other names: N-(2-Cyanoethyl)amphetamine; N-2-Cyanoethylamphetamine
- AHFS/Drugs.com: International Drug Names
- Routes of administration: By mouth
- Drug class: Norepinephrine–dopamine releasing agent; Stimulant; Anorectic
- ATC code: None

Legal status
- Legal status: BR: Class B2 (Anorectic drugs); CA: Schedule IV; DE: Prescription only (Anlage III for higher doses); US: Schedule IV

Pharmacokinetic data
- Metabolism: Partly converted to amphetamine (30–60%)
- Metabolites: Amphetamine
- Excretion: Urine, mainly as amphetamine, about 5 to 9% unchanged

Identifiers
- IUPAC name: 3-(1-phenylpropan-2-ylamino)propanenitrile
- CAS Number: 16397-28-7
- PubChem CID: 61810
- DrugBank: DB01550
- ChemSpider: 55690
- UNII: W0194S5FOA
- KEGG: D07947
- ChEMBL: ChEMBL2105566
- CompTox Dashboard (EPA): DTXSID0043921
- ECHA InfoCard: 100.036.752

Chemical and physical data
- Formula: C_{12}H_{16}N_{2}
- Molar mass: 188.274 g·mol^{−1}
- 3D model (JSmol): Interactive image
- SMILES: N#CCCNC(Cc1ccccc1)C
- InChI: InChI=1S/C12H16N2/c1-11(14-9-5-8-13)10-12-6-3-2-4-7-12/h2-4,6-7,11,14H,5,9-10H2,1H3; Key:IQUFSXIQAFPIMR-UHFFFAOYSA-N

Fenproporex, sold under the brand name Perphoxene and also known as N-(2-cyanoethyl)amphetamine, is a stimulant drug of the phenethylamine and amphetamine chemical classes that was developed in the 1960s. It is used as an appetite suppressant for the treatment of obesity.

Fenproporex produces amphetamine as a metabolite and was withdrawn in many countries following problems with abuse, but it is still prescribed in some countries. It is sometimes combined with benzodiazepines, antidepressants, and other compounds to create a version of the "rainbow diet pill".

Fenproporex has never been approved by the US Food and Drug Administration (FDA) for sale in the US due to lack of efficacy and safety data. However, in March 2009, the FDA warned consumers that it has been detected as an unlabeled component of diet pills available over the Internet. Fenproporex is designated a Schedule IV controlled substance in the US pursuant to the Controlled Substances Act.

Fenproporex is on the list of substances banned by the World Anti-Doping Agency, and any sportsperson testing positive for the substance faces a ban from competition.

== See also ==
- Substituted amphetamine
- Propylamphetamine
- Mefenorex
- N-(2-Cyanoethyl)phenethylamine (CEPEA)
