= HLP005 =

Serotonergic psychedelic

Clinical data
- Other names: HLP005; HLP-005; CYB005; CYB-005; Deuterated phenethylamine; Deuterated phenethylamine derivative
- Drug class: Serotonin receptor agonist; Serotonergic psychedelic; Antiinflammatory drug

HLP005, or HLP-005, also known as deuterated phenethylamine derivative and formerly as CYB005, is a serotonin receptor agonist and serotonergic psychedelic which is under development for use at non-hallucinogenic doses in the treatment of CNS disorders and neuroinflammation.

== Pharmacology ==
=== Pharmacodynamics ===
HLP005 acts as a serotonin receptor agonist and is a serotonergic psychedelic. In addition, HLP005 may also inhibit serotonin and dopamine reuptake.

== Chemistry ==
Structure of CYB2108D, a deuterated analogue of 2C-T-36 (CYB2108; CYB210010).

HLP005 is a phenethylamine derivative and a deuterated compound. The exact chemical structure of HLP005 does not yet seem to have been disclosed. However, it appears to be closely related to CYB210010 (CYB2108; 2C-T-36 or 2C-T-TFM), which itself is non-deuterated. In addition, HLP005's developer has patent protection for HLP005, indicating that its chemical structure has been published in the patent literature. Some notable phenethylamines patented by Helus Pharma include the non-deuterated CYB2108 (2C-T-36) and its deuterated form CYB2108D (fully deuterated methoxy groups at 2 and 5 positions).

== Research ==
HLP005 is under development by Helus Pharma (formerly Cybin). As of November 2025, it is in the preclinical research stage of development for treatment of CNS disorders. The drug was also under development for treatment-resistant psychiatric disorders, but development for this indication was discontinued in November 2025. Other related drugs under development by Helus Pharma include the deuterated tryptamines deupsilocin (HLP003; CYB003) and deudimethyltryptamine (HLP004; CYB004).

== See also ==
- Substituted phenethylamine
- List of investigational hallucinogens and entactogens
- Deumescaline
- α,α-Dideuterophenethylamine
