= SPL028 =

Clinical data
- Other names: SPL-028; α,α-Dideutero-N,N-dimethyltryptamine; N,N-D_{2}-dimethyltryptamine; D_{2}-DMT; DMT-d2
- Routes of administration: Intravenous injection, intramuscular injection
- Drug class: Serotonin receptor modulator; Serotonergic psychedelic; Hallucinogen
- ATC code: None

Identifiers
- PubChem CID: 10241628
- ChemSpider: 8417115

Chemical and physical data
- 3D model (JSmol): Interactive image
- SMILES: [2H]C([2H])(CC1=CNC2=CC=CC=C21)N(C)C
- InChI: InChI=1S/C12H16N2/c1-14(2)8-7-10-9-13-12-6-4-3-5-11(10)12/h3-6,9,13H,7-8H2,1-2H3/i8D2; Key:DMULVCHRPCFFGV-MGVXTIMCSA-N

SPL028, or SPL-028, also known as α,α-dideutero-N,N-dimethyltryptamine (D_{2}-DMT), is a psychedelic drug of the tryptamine family which is under development for the treatment of depressive disorders. It is the analogue of dimethyltryptamine (DMT) in which the α carbon has been dideuterated. SPL028's route of administration is intravenous injection or intramuscular injection.

== Pharmacology ==
SPL028 shows similar pharmacodynamics as DMT in vitro. Relatedly, SPL028 generalized with DMT in rodent drug discrimination tests. On the other hand, SPL028 differs from DMT in terms of pharmacokinetics; it is more resistant to metabolism and shows a prolonged duration. In a phase 1 clinical trial, SPL-028 by intramuscular injection produced robust psychedelic effects of short duration in humans.

== Research ==
SPL028 was originated by Small Pharma and is under development by Cybin. Small Pharma was acquired by Cybin in 2023. As of February 2024, SPL028 is in phase 1 clinical trials.

== See also ==
- Substituted tryptamine
- List of investigational hallucinogens and entactogens
- Deudimethyltryptamine (DMT-d10; HLP004; CYB004)
- Deuterated 5-MeO-DMT
- α,α-Dideuterotryptamine
