= Deupsilocin =

Serotonergic psychedelic

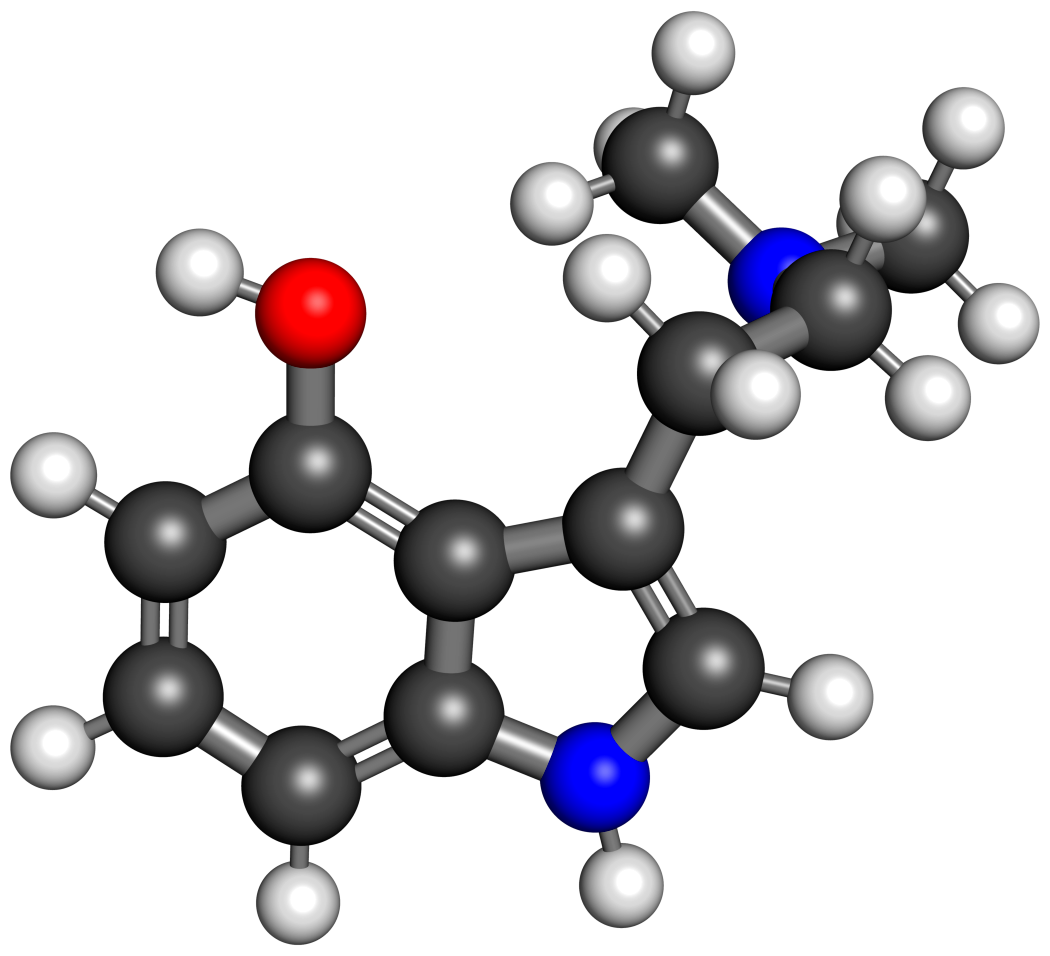

Clinical data
- Other names: Psilocin-d10; Psilocin-D10; HLP003; HLP-003; CYB003; CYB-003; Deuterated psilocybin analogue; Deuterated psilocin analogue; Deuterated psilocin; Decadeuteropsilocin
- Routes of administration: Oral
- Drug class: Serotonergic psychedelic; Hallucinogen

Pharmacokinetic data
- Onset of action: <15 minutes
- Duration of action: 4–6 hours

Identifiers
- IUPAC name: 3-[2-[bis(trideuteriomethyl)amino]-1,1,2,2-tetradeuterioethyl]-1H-indol-4-ol
- CAS Number: 1435934-64-7
- PubChem CID: 117065176
- ChemSpider: 95665393
- UNII: KXD3HS8D6X
- KEGG: D13136
- ChEMBL: ChEMBL4877198

Chemical and physical data
- Formula: C_{12}H_{16}N_{2}O
- Molar mass: 204.273 g·mol^{−1}
- 3D model (JSmol): Interactive image
- SMILES: [2H]C([2H])([2H])N(C([2H])([2H])[2H])C([2H])([2H])C([2H])([2H])C1=CNC2=C1C(=CC=C2)O
- InChI: InChI=1S/C12H16N2O/c1-14(2)7-6-9-8-13-10-4-3-5-11(15)12(9)10/h3-5,8,13,15H,6-7H2,1-2H3/i1D3,2D3,6D2,7D2; Key:SPCIYGNTAMCTRO-HXOHQZFQSA-N

Deupsilocin (INN, USAN; former developmental code names HLP003 and CYB0003), also known as deuterated psilocin or as psilocin-d10, is a psychedelic drug of the tryptamine family related to psilocin which is under development for the treatment of major depressive disorder, alcoholism, and other psychiatric disorders. It is taken orally. The drug is a deuterated isotopologue of psilocin with altered pharmacokinetics.

== Pharmacology ==
The pharmacodynamic profile of deupsilocin, including its interactions with serotonin receptors and its effects in animals, is similar to that of psilocin. As with psilocin, deupsilocin is a potent agonist of the serotonin 5-HT_{2A} receptor and produces psychedelic-like effects in animals. However, it was developed to have improved pharmacokinetic properties compared to psilocybin, including reduced variability in circulating levels, a faster onset of action, and a shorter duration.

In humans, deupsilocin has been reported to have 2.2-fold higher peak levels and 3.5-fold higher area-under-the-curve (AUC) levels than psilocybin at equivalent doses. It is said to have a rapid onset of less than 15 minutes and a duration of 4 to 6 hours.

== Chemistry ==
=== Analogues ===
In addition to deupsilocin, Helus Pharma has also patented other deuterated psilocin isotopologues. Other deuterated drugs related to deupsilocin include the deuterated dimethyltryptamine (DMT) isotopologues deudimethyltryptamine (HLP004; CYB004; DMT-d10; deudimethyltryptamine) and SPL028 (D_{2}-DMT) and the deuterated phenethylamine HLP005 (CYB005).

== Research ==
In 2024, deupsilocin received a breakthrough therapy designation from the U.S. FDA and was in phase 3 clinical trials for major depressive disorder and is in the preclinical stage of development for alcoholism and other psychiatric disorders. Two phase 3 clinical trials for major depressive disorder are being initiated in November 2024 and February 2025. The drug is under development by Helus Pharma (formerly Cybin).

== See also ==
- Substituted tryptamine
- List of investigational hallucinogens and entactogens
- List of investigational antidepressants
- Deudimethyltryptamine
- Deuterated 5-MeO-DMT
