= AOC3 =

Enzyme

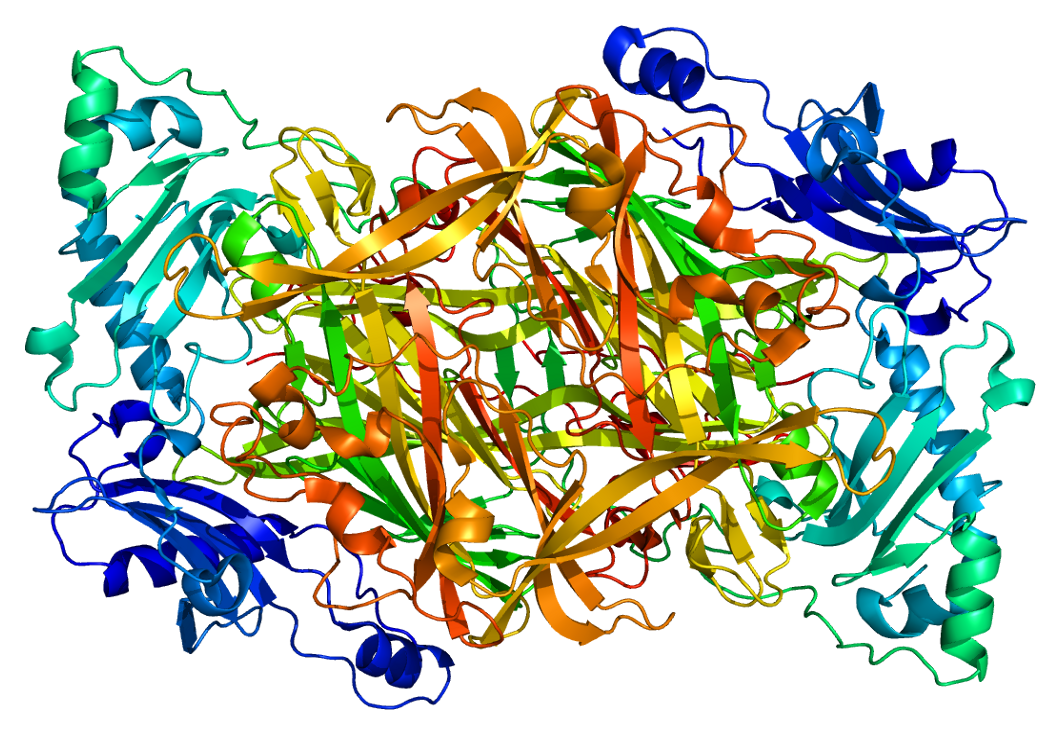

Identifiers
- Aliases: AOC3, HPAO, SSAO, VAP-1, VAP1, amine oxidase, copper containing 3, amine oxidase copper containing 3
- External IDs: OMIM: 603735; MGI: 1306797; GeneCards: AOC3
Available structures
| PDB | Ortholog search: PDBe RCSB |
| PDB | List of PDB id codes 1PU4, 1US1, 2C10, 2C11, 2Y73, 2Y74, 3ALA, 4BTW, 4BTX, 4BTY |
Enzyme activity
| EC # | BRENDA | ExPASy | KEGG | MetaCyc |
|---|---|---|---|---|
| 1.4.3.21 | ↗ | ↗ | ↗ | ↗ |

Gene location (Human)
| Chr. | Chromosome 17 (human) |
| Band | 17q21.31 | Start | 42,851,184 bp |
| Band | 17q21.31 | End | 42,858,130 bp |

Gene location (Mouse)
| Chr. | Chromosome 11 (mouse) |
| Band | 11|11 D | Start | 101,221,431 bp |
| Band | 11|11 D | End | 101,232,764 bp |
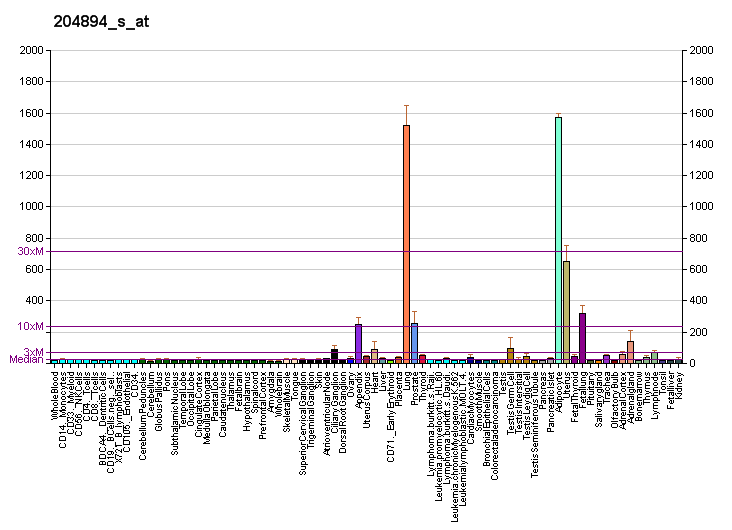
RNA expression pattern
| Bgee | Human / Mouse (ortholog); Top expressed in: saphenous vein; superficial temporal artery; right lung; popliteal artery; tibial arteries; right coronary artery; left coronary artery; lower lobe of lung; Descending thoracic aorta; ascending aorta / Top expressed in: white adipose tissue; ascending aorta; brown adipose tissue; lactiferous gland; subcutaneous adipose tissue; aortic valve; tunica adventitia of aorta; tunica media of zone of aorta; intercostal muscle; umbilical cord; More reference expression data |
| BioGPS | More reference expression data |
Gene ontology
| Molecular function | calcium ion binding; protein homodimerization activity; quinone binding; aliphatic-amine oxidase activity; metal ion binding; tryptamine:oxygen oxidoreductase (deaminating) activity; protein binding; protein heterodimerization activity; oxidoreductase activity; phenethylamine:oxygen oxidoreductase (deaminating) activity; copper ion binding; aminoacetone:oxygen oxidoreductase(deaminating) activity; primary amine oxidase activity |
| Cellular component | cytoplasm; integral component of membrane; Golgi apparatus; membrane; plasma membrane; microvillus; cell surface; early endosome; endoplasmic reticulum |
| Biological process | response to antibiotic; amine metabolic process; cell adhesion; xenobiotic metabolic process; inflammatory response; negative regulation of primary amine oxidase activity |
Sources:Amigo / QuickGO
Orthologs
| Databases | NCBI: entry; OMA: entry |
| Species | Human | Mouse |
| Entrez | 8639 | 11754 |
| Ensembl | ENSG00000131471 | ENSMUSG00000019326 |
| UniProt | Q16853 | O70423 |
| RefSeq (mRNA) | NM_001277731; NM_001277732; NM_003734 | NM_009675 |
| RefSeq (protein) | NP_001264660; NP_001264661; NP_003725 | NP_033805 |
| Location (UCSC) | Chr 17: 42.85 – 42.86 Mb | Chr 11: 101.22 – 101.23 Mb |
| PubMed search |
- Wikidata
| View/Edit Human | View/Edit Mouse |

Amine oxidase, copper containing 3 (AOC3), also known as vascular adhesion protein (VAP-1) and HPAO is an enzyme that in humans is encoded by the AOC3 gene on chromosome 17. This protein is a member of the semicarbazide-sensitive amine oxidase (SSAO; a.k.a. primary amine oxidase) family of enzymes and is associated with many vascular diseases.

== Structure ==
VAP-1 is a type 1 membrane-bound glycoprotein that has a distal adhesion domain and an enzymatically active amine oxidase site outside of the membrane. The AOC3 gene is mapped onto 17q21 and has an exon count of 6.

== Function ==
Amine oxidases are a family of enzymes that catalyze the oxidation of various endogenous amines, including histamine or dopamine. VAP-1 constitutes the copper dependent class of amine oxidases, such as lysyl oxidase or lysine demethylase, and is one of the four known in humans. The other class is flavin dependent such as monoamine oxidase (MAO) A and B. VAP-1, in particular, catalyzes the oxidative conversion of primary amines (methylamine and aminoacetone) to aldehydes (formaldehyde and methylglyoxal) ammonium and hydrogen peroxide in the presence of copper and quinone cofactor.

VAP-1 is primarily localized on the cell surface on the adipocyte plasma membrane. However, circulating VAP-1 has been shown to be the main source of SSAO in human serum. Serum VAP-1 originates from many tissues. VAP-1 has adhesive properties, functional monoamine oxidase activity, and possibly plays a role in glucose handling, leukocyte trafficking, and migration during inflammation. This rise in metabolic products contributes to generating advanced glycation end-products and oxidative stress along with the monoamine detoxification in the organism.

Like monoamine oxidase (MAO), VAP-1 can deaminate short-chain primary amines, but SSAO enzymes, including VAP-1, can tolerate several selective flavin-dependent MAO-A and MAO-B inhibitors like clorgiline, pargyline, and deprenyl, but are still sensitive to semicarbazide and other hydrazines, hydroxylamine and propargylamine.

VAP-1 is found in the smooth muscle of blood vessels and various other tissues, and can mostly be found in two forms: tissue-bound and soluble isoforms. The tissue-bound SSAO is primarily located in the leukocytes, adipocytes, and the endothelium of highly vascularized tissues, including the kidney, liver, and gonads. Thus, this form participates in cellular differentiation, deposition of the ECM (extracellular matrix) in smooth muscle cells, lipid trafficking in adipocytes and control of muscular tone, by mechanisms that are not completely understood. The soluble form, which is commonly known as VAP-1, is a proinflammatory protein derived from shedding of the transmembrane protein. It is highly expressed on the endothelium of the lung and trachea, and absent from leukocytes and epithelial cells. It moderates leukocyte recruitment, is both an adhesion molecule and a primary amine oxidase, and plays a role in clinical disease.

== Clinical significance ==
Membrane-bound VAP-1 releases an active, soluble form of the protein, which may be conducive to increased inflammation and the progression of many vascular disorders. In particular, elevation of VAP-1 activity and the increased enzymatic-mediated deamination is proposed to play a role in renal and vascular disease, oxidative stress, acute and chronic hyperglycemia, and diabetes complications.

In diabetic patients, the amine oxidase activity stimulates glucose uptake via translocation of transporters to the cell membrane in adipocytes and smooth muscle cells. This modifies hepatic glucose homeostasis and may contribute to patterns of GLUT expression in chronic disease, as insulin resistance in humans have been linked to altered expression of GLUT isoforms by granulosa cells and adipose tissues.

In particular, hydrogen peroxide, released during the deamination of SSAO, acts as a signal-transducing molecule, affecting GLUT1 and GLUT4 translocation to the plasma membrane by granulosa cells and adipose tissue. This mimics insulin and interferes with cell processes in diabetic patients. Additionally, hydrogen peroxide, along with aldehydes and glucose, is involved in generating advanced glycation end-products and oxidative stress, which leads to the development of atherosclerosis, a disease in which plaque builds up inside arteries.

Cell processes involved in insulin resistance are often associated with elevated VAP-1 expression and modified GLUT expression in patients with liver diseases. Accordingly, subjects with diabetes are often at an increased risk for the development of and mortality from various cancers, including colorectal cancer hepatocellular carcinoma. Because of hyperinsulinemia - the increased bioavailability of insulin-like growth factors-1 and hypoadiponectinemia - diabetic patients have a greater chance of developing oncogenesis and tumor progression. In one study, serum VAP-1 was shown to independently predict 10-year all-cause mortality, cardiovascular mortality, and cancer-related mortality in subjects with type 2 diabetes. This may be because VAP-1 is involved in binding TIL, lymphokine-activated killer cells, and natural killer cells to the vasculature of cancer tissue. Hence, increased serum VAP-1 activity has been repeatedly found to be associated with various vascular disorders, such as the complications of diabetes mellitus, acute and chronic hyperglycemia, congestive heart failure, atherosclerosis, and Alzheimer's disease.

The same elevation is seen in kidney disease, even when accounted for factors of age, gender, and smoking. Studies have established a strong correlation between serum VAP-1 levels and urinary albumin excretion, which supports the idea that VAP-1 may be involved in the pathogenesis of kidney damage in humans. In renal pathology, the aldehydes produced by SSAO are highly reactive and lead to the formation of protein cross-linking and oxidative stress. Additionally, VAP-1 mediates leukocyte migration and, eventually, can lead to chronic inflammatory cell accumulation and the development of kidney fibrosis.

As for stroke patients, the products from deamination induce cytotoxicity protein cross-linking and amyloid-beta (Aβ) aggregation along with oxidative stress and thus are considered a potential risk factor for stress-related angiopathy. In these patients, VAP-1 may be involved in increasing vascular damage due to increased susceptibility of endothelial cells to oxygen-glucose deprivation (OGD). In hemorrhagic stroke patients, plasmatic VAP-1 activity is increase, and in ischemic stroke patients, it can predict the appearance of parenchymal hemorrhages after tissue plasminogen activator treatment due to the transmigration of inflammatory cells into ischaemic brain. VAP-1-expression is increased in blood vessels of ischemic areas where it may be mediating neutrophil adhesion to vascular endothelium in ischemic heart. The presence of diminished expression of vascular VAP-1 in infarcted brain areas and the increased concentration of VAP-1 in serum suggests that acute cerebral ischaemia triggers early release of endothelial VAP-1 from brain vasculature.

Lastly, during pulmonary infection and airway hyper-activity, VAP-1 may also contribute to the recruitment of inflammatory cells and the transfer of neutrophils from the microvasculature. Inhibitors of VAP-1 may be effective in reducing inflammation in various vascular diseases, but more studies are needed to understand to what extent.

Whether serum VAP-1 is a good biomarker for these diseases requires further investigation. Although many studies concerning VAP-1 as a therapeutic target are becoming more frequent, it is difficult to study VAP-1 in cell or tissue systems, since the enzyme progressively loses its expression, and immortalized cell lines do not show any expression at all.
