= AOC2 =

Protein

Identifiers
- Aliases: AOC2, DAO2, RAO, amine oxidase, copper containing 2, SSAO, amine oxidase copper containing 2
- External IDs: OMIM: 602268; MGI: 2668431; GeneCards: AOC2
Enzyme activity
EC #	BRENDA	ExPASy	KEGG	MetaCyc
1.4.3.21	↗	↗	↗	↗

Gene location (Human)
Chr.	Chromosome 17 (human)
Band	17q21.31	Start	42,844,580 bp
Band	17q21.31	End	42,850,707 bp

Gene location (Mouse)
Chr.	Chromosome 11 (mouse)
Band	11|11 D	Start	101,215,889 bp
Band	11|11 D	End	101,220,528 bp
RNA expression pattern
Bgee	Human / Mouse (ortholog); Top expressed in: sperm; testicle; periodontal fiber; secondary oocyte; gonad; blood; cartilage tissue; tibia; right lobe of liver; subcutaneous adipose tissue / Top expressed in: bone marrow; white adipose tissue; adrenal gland; islet of Langerhans; granulocyte; ganglionic eminence; ventricular zone; jejunum; neural layer of retina; duodenum; More reference expression data
BioGPS	n/a
Gene ontology
Molecular function	electron transfer activity; tryptamine:oxygen oxidoreductase (deaminating) activity; aliphatic-amine oxidase activity; oxidoreductase activity; phenethylamine:oxygen oxidoreductase (deaminating) activity; copper ion binding; metal ion binding; quinone binding; aminoacetone:oxygen oxidoreductase(deaminating) activity; primary amine oxidase activity
Cellular component	cytoplasm; plasma membrane; membrane
Biological process	xenobiotic metabolic process; amine metabolic process; catecholamine metabolic process; visual perception; electron transport chain
Sources:Amigo / QuickGO
Orthologs
Databases	NCBI: entry; OMA: entry
Species	Human	Mouse
Entrez	314	237940
Ensembl	ENSG00000131480	ENSMUSG00000078651
UniProt	O75106	Q812C9
RefSeq (mRNA)	NM_009590; NM_001158	NM_178932
RefSeq (protein)	NP_001149; NP_033720	NP_849263
Location (UCSC)	Chr 17: 42.84 – 42.85 Mb	Chr 11: 101.22 – 101.22 Mb
PubMed search
- Wikidata
View/Edit Human	View/Edit Mouse

Amine oxidase, copper containing 2 (AOC2) is a protein that in humans is encoded by the AOC2 gene. The protein is a copper-containing primary amine oxidase enzyme.

== Function ==
Copper amine oxidases catalyze the oxidative conversion of amines to aldehydes and ammonia in the presence of copper and quinone cofactor. This gene shows high sequence similarity to copper amine oxidases from various species ranging from bacteria to mammals. The protein contains several conserved motifs including the active site of amine oxidases and the histidine residues that likely bind copper. It may be a critical modulator of signal transmission in retina, possibly by degrading the biogenic amines dopamine, histamine, and putrescine. This gene may be a candidate gene for hereditary ocular diseases. Alternate splicing results in multiple transcript variants.
