= 5-MeO-DMT-d4 =

Clinical data
- Other names: [^{2}H4]-5-MeO-DMT; α,α,β,β-Tetradeutero-5-MeO-DMT; α,α,β,β-Tetradeutero-5-methoxy-N,N-dimethyltryptamine
- Drug class: Serotonin receptor modulator; Serotonergic psychedelic; Hallucinogen
- ATC code: None

Identifiers
- IUPAC name: 1,1,2,2-tetradeuterio-2-(5-methoxy-1H-indol-3-yl)-N,N-dimethylethanamine
- CAS Number: 66521-37-7
- PubChem CID: 25193910
- ChemSpider: 107437297

Chemical and physical data
- Formula: C_{13}H_{18}N_{2}O
- Molar mass: 218.300 g·mol^{−1}
- 3D model (JSmol): Interactive image
- SMILES: [2H]C([2H])(C1=CNC2=C1C=C(C=C2)OC)C([2H])([2H])N(C)C
- InChI: InChI=1S/C13H18N2O/c1-15(2)7-6-10-9-14-13-5-4-11(16-3)8-12(10)13/h4-5,8-9,14H,6-7H2,1-3H3/i6D2,7D2; Key:ZSTKHSQDNIGFLM-KXGHAPEVSA-N

5-MeO-DMT-d4, also known as α,α,β,β-tetradeutero-5-MeO-DMT, is a serotonin receptor modulator and putative psychedelic drug of the tryptamine and 5-methoxytryptamine families related to 5-MeO-DMT. It is the isotopologue of 5-MeO-DMT in which the hydrogen atoms at the α and β positions have been replaced with the deuterium isotopes.

== Pharmacology ==
5-MeO-DMT-d4 shows similar affinities for serotonin receptors and other targets as 5-MeO-DMT. However, the drug is thought to be much more resistant to metabolism by monoamine oxidase (MAO) than 5-MeO-DMT, which in turn may result in greater potency and/or a longer duration. In addition, it may result in the drug becoming orally active, though this remains to be studied. It is known that monoamine oxidase inhibitors (MAOIs) with 5-MeO-DMT increase brain exposure to 5-MeO-DMT by approximately 20-fold in animals. 5-MeO-DMT-d4 showed similar effects on locomotor activity in rodents as a combination of 5-MeO-DMT and a MAOI.

== Chemistry ==
=== Synthesis ===
The chemical synthesis of 5-MeO-DMT-d4 has been described.

== History ==
5-MeO-DMT-d4 was first described in the scientific literature by 1977. Subsequently, it was described in greater detail by Adam Halberstadt and David E. Nichols and colleagues in 2012. The study of 5-MeO-DMT-d4 was preceded by that of DMT-d4 which was described in the 1980s.

== See also ==
- Substituted tryptamine
- Deudimethyltryptamine
- Deupsilocin
- 5-MeO-DMT/harmaline
