= Primary-amine oxidase =

Class of enzymes

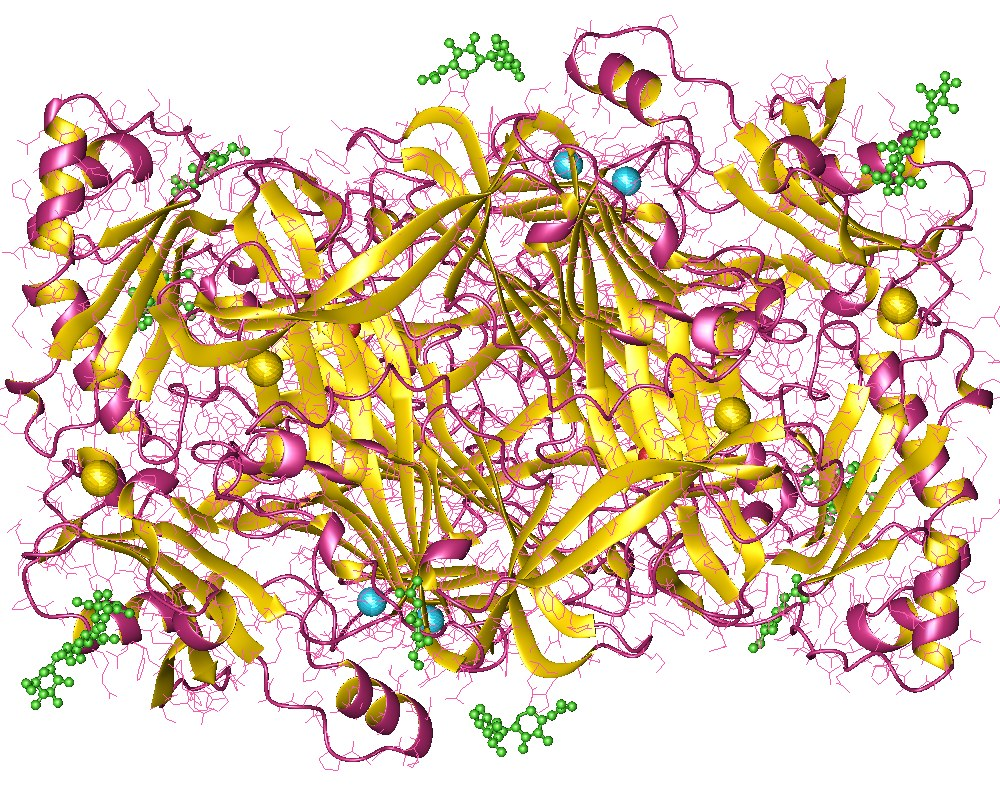
- Amine oxidase (semicarbazide-sensitive) dimer, Human

Identifiers
- EC no.: 1.4.3.21

Databases
- IntEnz: IntEnz view
- BRENDA: BRENDA entry
- ExPASy: NiceZyme view
- KEGG: KEGG entry
- MetaCyc: metabolic pathway
- PRIAM: profile
- PDB structures: RCSB PDB PDBe PDBsum
Search
- PMC: articles
- PubMed: articles
- NCBI: proteins

Primary-amine oxidase, also known as semicarbazide-sensitive amine oxidase (SSAO), is an enzyme (EC 1.4.3.21) with the systematic name primary-amine:oxygen oxidoreductase (deaminating). This enzyme catalyses the following chemical reaction

RCH_{2}NH_{2} + H_{2}O + O_{2} $\rightleftharpoons$ RCHO + NH_{3} + H_{2}O_{2}

These enzymes are copper quinoproteins (2,4,5-trihydroxyphenylalanine quinone).

Like monoamine oxidase (MAO), SSAO can deaminate short-chain primary amines, but is insensitive to MAO inhibitors. Semicarbazide inhibits the enzyme, in addition to other hydrazines, hydroxylamine and propargylamine. However, hydrazines are weak inhibitors and stronger inhibitors have been developed.

SSAO is found in the smooth muscle of blood vessels and various other tissues. The physiological function of SSAO is not well understood. Development of blood vessels, lipolysis regulation, and detoxication are suggested. It may function as a scavenger enzyme to assist MAO. However, the oxidation process generates harmful products that may be involved in causing atherosclerosis and vascular damage in diabetes. Elevation of SSAO activity is observed in atherosclerosis, diabetes mellitus, obesity, carotid plaque cases and varicosities.

There are SSAO inhibitors in development.

== Human proteins containing this domain ==
- AOC2
- AOC3

== Bacterial proteins containing this domain ==
- Tyramine oxidase (tynA) in Escherichia coli
