= Willy Myco =

Puerto RIcan mycologist

- Born: 1987 or 1988 (age 38–39); From Boston, Massachusetts
- Other names: Willy’s World; "Trip Team family" (followers)
- Education: University of Massachusetts; Harvard University
- Occupations: Mycologist, chemist, and content creator
- Years active: 2014–present
- Known for: Videos and community on production of psychedelics
- Website: tripteambodega.com

Willy Myco, with his YouTube channel known as Willy's World, is an anonymous Puerto Rican–American mycologist, chemist, and content creator who publishes educational videos on how to make psychedelic drugs such as psilocybin mushrooms and LSD.

== Early life ==
Willy Myco was born around 1987 or 1988. He is from Boston, Massachusetts and his parents are originally from Puerto Rico. Myco is half Puerto Rican and half Italian. In 2002, when he was around 14 years old, Myco extracted and tried dimethyltryptamine (DMT) for the first time. He had a transformative experience with the drug and says that psychedelics then "became my entire world". Myco is said to have earned a bachelor's degree in microbiology at the University of Massachusetts, graduated from Harvard University, and subsequently worked at a major pharmaceutical company.

== Content creation ==
Myco started creating videos on how to make psychedelic drugs in 2014. He posted his first video, about aspects of growing psilocybin-containing mushrooms, on YouTube in 2014. This video unexpectedly went viral and his account accrued thousands of subscribers. Subsequently, Myco says that he quit his job working in the pharmaceutical industry and focused on doing psychedelic content creation full-time.

Myco has released more than 120 videos detailing how to make psychedelics as of August 2026. His videos include guides on how to synthesize LSD, synthesize MDMA, synthesize 2C-B, cultivate psilocybin-containing mushrooms, extract mescaline from cacti, extract dimethyltryptamine (DMT), and make DMT vapes, among other topics. They provide exact or step-by-step instructions on how to make psychedelics in very simple terms or with a "for dummies" style. Each of his videos is said to cost tens of thousands of dollars to make. His video on LSD synthesis is said to have taken years of planning and to have cost over US$100,000 to make. Myco's YouTube channel had over 96,000 followers and his Patreon had more than 14,500 subscribers in August 2026. He also has a private Discord server. Myco's YouTube and Patreon accounts were suspended in August 2026 due to cited terms of service violations, but prior to this, his content appears to have had annual revenue well into the six figures.

Myco originally did videos mostly on mycology and growing psilocybin-containing mushrooms. In 2023 however, Myco began plans to make a video on how to synthesize the synthetic psychedelic drug LSD. Following consultation with attorneys, in order to avoid censure and prosecution, the synthesis was conducted and filmed at a laboratory at the University of Okara, Pakistan, which has government approval to make psychedelics for research purposes, rather than in the United States. This video showed how to make LSD over the course of three days and was said to be the "world's first" such video on LSD synthesis. Months after his video on LSD synthesis, Myco made the first video on how to synthesize MDMA, also in Pakistan. Then he released a video on synthesizing 2C-B at the same lab in March 2026.

Following the United States Drug Enforcement Administration (DEA)'s plans to make 7-hydroxymitragynine (7-OH) a Schedule I controlled substance, Myco announced plans to make a video on how to synthesize 7-OH. Unlike Myco's other videos, which are on psychedelics, 7-OH is an opioid. Myco claimed that part of his motivation for making the video was that many people are using 7-OH to escape opioid addiction.

According to Myco, he does not promote use of drugs, saying instead that his content is purely scientific and is about education and harm reduction. His work providing accessible information on how to make psychedelic drugs has been described by reporters and others as "democratizing psychedelic knowledge" or "democratizing making drugs" and as "creating crowdsourced, decentralized access models for these substances".

== Controversy ==
Myco has been critiqued for his secrecy and his activities being illegal and some of his content's rigor has been questioned. His work with controlled substances is frequently illegal and he creates his content anonymously, always wearing a face mask in his photos and videos. His first and real name is Willy, while his last name is pseudonymous and short for "Mycologist". Both Myco's YouTube and Patreon accounts were suspended following a Wired article about him by journalist Mattha Busby in August 2026. Myco has said that he is appealing the terminations. He has said that if he is unsuccessful with the appeals, he will instead continue his content through his website and his Discord server.

Hamilton Morris, an expert in the area of psychedelic chemistry and creator of the Vice Media show Hamilton's Pharmacopeia, which includes detailed drug synthesis information in video form analogously to Myco's content, has criticized Myco's video on synthesis of LSD. He expressed that he "strongly suspected" that no actual LSD was synthesized, due to "fatal procedural and stoichiometric errors". In addition, he said that even if it was successfully produced, the LSD could not be 100% pure as stated, because the result was a green–blue liquid, whereas pure LSD is crystalline solid. Myco did not conduct chemical analysis of the LSD to confirm its authenticity or purity in the video. In any case, he has responded and defended his work, saying that the synthesis route was long-established, whilst conceding some minor presentation errors in the video.

== Personal life ==
Myco has disclosed his personal experiences with psychedelic drugs, saying that they have been transformative experiences for him and have helped bring him out of serious depression. He has said that psychedelics are not merely substances for him, but are sacraments and medicines.

Myco advocates for decriminalization but not for legalization of psychedelics. He supports personal cultivation and use of psychedelics, but says that legalization brings about problems such as oversaturation and large companies "stepping on the toes" of cultivators. Myco is described by journalists as pushing away from gatekeeping clinics, regulators, and expensive trip sitters and instead towards "radical self-sufficiency".

Myco has expressed that he sees his followers as his "family" and prominently refers to his followers as the "Trip Team family". He has reportedly helped fundraise and pay for legal and medical costs of his followers. Myco holds a yearly psychedelic vacation with dozens of his followers.

Myco formerly lived and worked in Boston, Massachusetts, but has since relocated to Puerto Rico. According to Myco, clandestine chemists and drug dealers, including those involved with LSD, have threatened him due to his work hurting their businesses and have warned him not to release videos. Relatedly, he has said that he is heavily armed in Puerto Rico and always carries a gun for personal safety.

== See also ==
- List of YouTubers
- List of psychedelic chemists
- Hamilton's Pharmacopeia
