= Bibliography of Hamilton Morris =

This is a bibliography, or list of publications, of the psychoactive drug chemist and journalist Hamilton Morris.

== Journal articles ==
- Morris H, Wallach J (2014). "From PCP to MXE: a comprehensive review of the non-medical use of dissociative drugs" (PDF). Drug Test Anal. 6 (7–8): 614–632. doi:10.1002/dta.1620. PMID 24678061. Archived from the original (PDF) on 2021-04-21.
- Elliott SP, Brandt SD, Wallach J, Morris H, Kavanagh PV (May 2015). "First reported fatalities associated with the 'research chemical' 2-methoxydiphenidine". J Anal Toxicol. 39 (4): 287–293. doi:10.1093/jat/bkv006. PMID 25698777.
- Wallach J, Kavanagh PV, McLaughlin G, Morris N, Power JD, Elliott SP, Mercier MS, Lodge D, Morris H, Dempster NM, Brandt SD (May 2015). "Preparation and characterization of the 'research chemical' diphenidine, its pyrrolidine analogue, and their 2,2-diphenylethyl isomers" (PDF). Drug Test Anal. 7 (5): 358–367. doi:10.1002/dta.1689. PMID 25044512.
- McLaughlin G, Morris N, Kavanagh PV, Power JD, O'Brien J, Talbot B, Elliott SP, Wallach J, Hoang K, Morris H, Brandt SD (January 2016). "Test purchase, synthesis, and characterization of 2-methoxydiphenidine (MXP) and differentiation from its meta- and para-substituted isomers" (PDF). Drug Test Anal. 8 (1): 98–109. doi:10.1002/dta.1800. PMID 25873326.
- Wallach J, Kang H, Colestock T, Morris H, Bortolotto ZA, Collingridge GL, Lodge D, Halberstadt AL, Brandt SD, Adejare A (2016). "Pharmacological Investigations of the Dissociative 'Legal Highs' Diphenidine, Methoxphenidine and Analogues". PLOS ONE. 11 (6) e0157021. Bibcode:2016PLoSO..1157021W. doi:10.1371/journal.pone.0157021. PMC 4912077. PMID 27314670.
- Wallach JV, Morris H, Brandt SD (August 2017). "Is nitrogen mustard contamination responsible for the reported MT-45 toxicity?". Br J Dermatol. 177 (2): 594–595. doi:10.1111/bjd.15507. PMID 28369837.
- Colestock T, Wallach J, Mansi M, Filemban N, Morris H, Elliott SP, Westphal F, Brandt SD, Adejare A (February 2018). "Syntheses, analytical and pharmacological characterizations of the 'legal high' 4-[1-(3-methoxyphenyl)cyclohexyl]morpholine (3-MeO-PCMo) and analogues". Drug Test Anal. 10 (2): 272–283. doi:10.1002/dta.2213. PMID 28513099.
- Wallach J, Cao AB, Calkins MM, Heim AJ, Lanham JK, Bonniwell EM, Hennessey JJ, Bock HA, Anderson EI, Sherwood AM, Morris H, de Klein R, Klein AK, Cuccurazzu B, Gamrat J, Fannana T, Zauhar R, Halberstadt AL, McCorvy JD (December 2023). "Identification of 5-HT2A receptor signaling pathways associated with psychedelic potential". Nat Commun. 14 (1) 8221. doi:10.1038/s41467-023-44016-1. PMC 10724237. PMID 38102107.

== Book chapters ==
- Hamilton Morris (2015). "[Essay]". In Brookes, Kelsey (ed.). Psychedelic Space. Berkeley: Gingko Press. ISBN 978-1-58423-598-9.
- Morris, Hamilton (2018). "Introduction". In Roberts, Joe (ed.). We Ate the Acid. Anthology Editions. ISBN 978-1-944860-19-6.
- Morris, Hamilton (2021). "A Green and Sustainable Synthesis of 5-MeO-DMT". In Nelson, Ken (ed.). Bufo Alvarius: The Psychedelic Toad of the Sonoran Desert (Revised and expanded ed.). Tucson: Cream Design and Print.
- Morris, Hamilton (11 March 2026) [1821]. Introduction. Confessions of an English Opium Eater: And Other Works. By Quincey, Thomas De. Gallowglass Books. ISBN 979-8-23404410-5.

== Conference presentations ==
- Wallach, Jason; Morris, Hamilton. N-benzyl-phenethylamines: Pharmacophore approach to receptor binding selectivity.
- Morris, Hamilton (2014). Journalistic Responsibility in the Coverage of Psychedelics. Horizons: Perspectives on Psychedelics.
- Morris, Hamilton (3 November 2016). This Is Your Brain on Drugs. MCA Talk, Museum of Contemporary Art Chicago.
- Morris, Hamilton; Bennett, Raquel; Wallach, Jason (10 March 2019). God in a Bottle: A Conversation about Arylcyclohexylamines. Brooklyn Psychedelic Society. Brooklyn, New York.
- Morris, Hamilton (5 November 2022). Psychedelic Chemistry. Wonderland 2022. Mana Wynwood Convention Center, Miami, Florida. Archived from the original on 15 October 2024.
- Langlitz, Nicolas; Morris, Hamilton (March 2023). The Psychedelic Renaissance: High Hopes and Rising Concerns. SXSW 2023. Archived from the original on 14 November 2025.
- Morris, Hamilton (4 September 2023). Psychedelic Molecules. Psychedelic Molecules, 4th–5th September 2023, Prague, Czech Republic. Zenodo. doi:10.5281/zenodo.8393067.
- Morris, Hamilton (9 November 2023). In Conversation with Hamilton Morris. Wonderland 2023, Ice Palace Studios, Miami, Florida, November 9–11, 2023. Miami, Florida.
- Hamilton Morris; Gita Vaid; Liana Gillooly (2025). Ketamine Reality Check: Miracle, Mirage, or Misused?. Psychedelic Science 2025. Denver, Colorado: Multidisciplinary Association for Psychedelic Studies (MAPS).

== Media articles ==
=== VICE ===
- D. H. Ticklish (Hamilton Morris) (2 February 2008). ""A Giant Chinese Finger Trap Made of Rainbows Tried to Suck Me Into the Sky" – Part 1: My Many Trips Into the World of Chemical Psychedelics". VICE. Archived from the original on 7 October 2008. Alt.
- D. H. Ticklish (Hamilton Morris) (2 February 2008). ""A Giant Chinese Finger Trap Made of Rainbows Tried to Suck Me Into the Sky" – Part 2: My Many Trips Into the World of Chemical Psychedelics". VICE. Archived from the original on 20 November 2008. Alt.
- Hamilton Morris (2 September 2008). "The Magic Jews: From Manischewitz to Mescaline". vice.com. Vice Media. Archived from the original on 7 January 2012. Alt 1. Alt 2.
- Hamilton Morris (2 February 2009). "A Nice, Thick, Uncut 12-inch Shroom". vice.com. Vice Media. Archived from the original on 16 October 2011. Alt 1. Alt 2.
- Hamilton Morris (24 February 2009). "California - Salvaging the Economy". vice.com. Vice Media. Archived from the original on 21 May 2025.
- Hamilton Morris (4 April 2009). "Hamilton's Pharmacopeia: A Monthly Column By Hamilton Morris". vice.com. Vice Media. Archived from the original on 30 October 2011. Alt 1. Alt 2.
- Hamilton Morris (1 May 2009). "The Sapo Diaries". vice.com. Vice Media. Archived from the original on 8 October 2011. Alt 1. Alt 2.
- Hamilton Morris (4 May 2009). "Hamilton's Pharmacopeia - Scamiflu!". vice.com. Vice Media. Archived from the original on 3 June 2013.
- Hamilton Morris (31 May 2009). "Hamilton's Pharmacopeia: A Monthly Column By Hamilton Morris". vice.com. Vice Media. Archived from the original on 28 September 2011. Alt 1. Alt 2.
- Hamilton Morris (31 May 2009). "Does Cocaine Make You Smarter". vice.com. Vice Media. Archived from the original on 19 October 2011. Alt 1. Alt 2.
- Hamilton Morris (1 August 2009). "New Frontiers of Sobriety". vice.com. Vice Media. Archived from the original on 26 February 2012. Alt 1. Alt 2.
- Hamilton Morris (25 September 2009). "Get Your Erowid On". vice.com. Vice Media. Archived from the original on 25 September 2011.
- Morris, Hamilton; Lee, Maggie (1 October 2009). "Date-rape Me, My Friend". VICE.
- Hamilton Morris (1 January 2010). "The Icelandic Skin-Disease Mushroom Fashion Fiasco". vice.com. Vice Media. Archived from the original on 6 January 2026.
- Hamilton Morris (8 February 2010). "Killer Coke Explained". vice.com. Vice Media. Archived from the original on 30 July 2025.
- Hamilton Morris (2 May 2010). "The Last Interview With Alexander Shulgin: Which, Technically, Was Not an Interview at All". vice.com. Vice Media. Archived from the original on 29 September 2011. Alt 1. Alt 2.
- Hamilton Morris (31 May 2010). "Mephedrone: the Phantom Menace". vice.com. Vice Media. Archived from the original on 30 October 2011. Alt 1. Alt 2.
- Morris, Hamilton; Lee, Maggie (1 December 2010). "Ivory Wave: Surfing a Big Fat Line of Question Marks". VICE. Archived from the original on 18 November 2012. Alt.
- Hamilton Morris (22 December 2010). "SiHKAL: Shulgins I Have Known and Loved". vice.com. Vice Media. Archived from the original on 8 November 2020.
- Hamilton Morris (31 January 2011). "Interview with a Ketamine Chemist". vice.com. Vice Media. Archived from the original on 8 November 2020.
- Hamilton Morris (11 February 2011). "Hong Dong Brand Wang Bang". vice.com. Vice Media. Archived from the original on 21 November 2024.
- Hamilton Morris (4 April 2011). "Phencyclidine Cinema At Spectable Theater". vice.com. Vice Media. Archived from the original on 27 June 2023.
- Hamilton Morris (4 April 2011). "Heroin Haberdashery and Cocaine Cobbling". vice.com. Vice Media. Archived from the original on 24 October 2011. Alt 1. Alt 2.
- Hamilton Morris (1 May 2011). "Life Is a Cosmic Giggle on the Breath of the Universe: A Tour of Gordon Todd Skinner's Subterranean LSD Palace". vice.com. Vice Media. Archived from the original on 29 September 2011. Alt 1. Alt 2.
- Dr. Nephros Ouron (Hamilton Morris) (1 June 2011). "Tinkle Tweaking". VICE.
- Hamilton Morris (22 July 2011). "Ketaforensics - The Art and Science of Using Ketamine to Solve the JonBenét Ramsey Murder". vice.com. Vice Media. Archived from the original on 12 November 2020.
- Hamilton Morris (9 February 2012). "Tonight: Psychosurgical Cinema at Spectacle". vice.com. Vice Media. Alt URL
- Hamilton Morris (23 February 2011). "Stabbed in the Face". vice.com. Vice Media. Archived from the original on 14 September 2025.
- Hamilton Morris; Jason Wallach (9 August 2011). "Ask Hamilton & Jason: Pulverizer Marijuana for Later Snort?". vice.com. Vice Media. Archived from the original on 24 October 2011. Alt.
- Hamilton Morris (10 November 2011). "Psilocybin Cinema at Spectacle". vice.com. Vice Media. Archived from the original on 27 June 2023.
- Hamilton Morris (14 November 2011). "Shroom Ban: Means More Magical Truffles for the Netherlands". vice.com. Vice Media. Archived from the original on 3 November 2012.
- Hamilton Morris (20 April 2012). "4/20 Anabolic Cinema". vice.com. Vice Media. Archived from the original on 27 June 2023.
- Hamilton Morris (16 June 2012). "Cracking Cryptocacti: The Prickly Problem of the Cactus of the Four Winds". vice.com. Vice Media. Archived from the original on 18 August 2012. Alt 1. Alt 2.
- Hamilton Morris (7 September 2012). "Letter from the Guest Editor". vice.com. Vice Media. Archived from the original on 3 August 2021.
- Hamilton Morris (20 September 2012). "Criminal Chlorination". vice.com. Vice Media. Archived from the original on 4 November 2012.
- Hamilton Morris (24 September 2012). "Pages from the Lab Notebook of Alexander Shulgin: A Glance Through the History of Psychedelic Chemistry". vice.com. Vice Media. Archived from the original on 13 May 2016. Alt 1. Alt 2. Alt 2.
- Hamilton Morris; Jason Wallach (27 March 2013). "Sea DMT". vice.com. Vice Media. Archived from the original on 1 April 2015. Alt 1. Alt 2.
- Hamilton Morris (22 September 2013). "Hamilton's Pharmacopeia Goes in Search of the 'Ambien Effect'". vice.com. Vice Media. Archived from the original on 6 October 2025.
- Hamilton Morris (22 September 2013). "The Novelizer - An Interview with Alan Dean Foster on the Art of Adapting Sci-Fi Movies into Books". vice.com. Vice Media. Archived from the original on 6 October 2025.
- Hamilton Morris (31 October 2013). "'WNUF Halloween Special': A Love Letter to VHS and Public Access TV". vice.com. Vice Media. Archived from the original on 8 October 2014.
- Hamilton Morris (1 November 2013). "'Deadly Force' Tonight at Spectacle". vice.com. Vice Media. Archived from the original on 18 July 2025.
- Hamilton Morris (6 February 2014). "Adam Green Plans to Remake 'Aladdin'". vice.com. Vice Media. Archived from the original on 21 May 2025.
- Hamilton Morris (31 March 2014). "Getting High on HIV Medication". vice.com. Vice Media. Archived from the original on 12 August 2025.
- Hamilton Morris (4 June 2014). "Goodbye, Alexander Shulgin". vice.com. Vice Media. Archived from the original on 6 June 2014. Alt 1. Alt 2.
- Hamilton Morris (21 July 2014). "No Higgs Boson of Hitler: Ron Rosenbaum Explains 'Explaining Hitler'". vice.com. Vice Media. Archived from the original on 12 November 2020.
- Hamilton Morris (25 June 2016). "Meet the Kiwi Steampunk Rocker Who Gave the World Synthetic Drugs". vice.com. Vice Media. Archived from the original on 21 May 2025. Alt.

=== Harper's Magazine ===
- Hamilton Morris (November 2011). "I Walked With a Zombie: Travels Among the Undead". Harper's Magazine. pp. 52–61.
- Hamilton Morris (November 2013). "Blood Spore: Of Murder and Mushrooms" (PDF). Harper's Magazine. pp. 41–56. Archived from the original on 10 March 2021.
- Hamilton Morris (August 2013). "Gaboxadol". Harper's Magazine. pp. 43–47. Archived from the original on 19 November 2025.
- Hamilton Morris (October 2015). "Sad Pink Monkey Blues". Harper's Magazine. pp. 56–59. Archived from the original on 24 April 2025.

=== The Brooklyn Rail ===
- Hamilton Morris (August 2010). "Psychadelic Maturity". The Brooklyn Rail.
- Hamilton Morris (June 2012). "Carsten Höller: Artist's Portfolio". The Brooklyn Rail.

=== Others ===
- Hamilton Morris (2014). "Alexander Shulgin (1925–2014)". The Fabulist. No. 5.
- Morris, Hamilton (31 May 2019). "Finding Hide-and-Seek". The Museum of Modern Art. Supplemental Video

== Videos ==
=== Hamilton's Pharmacopeia (web series, Vice Media, 2009–2016) ===
Morris published a web series called Hamilton's Pharmacopeia for Vice Media with the following episodes:

- The Sapo Diaries: Tripping on Hallucinogenic Frogs / Getting High on Frogs (Phyllomedusa bicolor skin secretions (sapo, kambo) in Amazonia)
- The Icelandic Skin-Disease Mushroom Fashion Fiasco
- Nzambi: Investigating the Haitian Zombie (Wade Davis's theory of tetrodotoxin-mediated zombification in Haiti)
- SiHKAL: Shulgins I Have Known and Loved: The Man who Birthed Ecstasy in a Test-Tube (with Alexander Shulgin and Ann Shulgin)
- Getting High on Krystle: Underground LSD Palace (about Krystle Cole and her involvement with Gordon Todd Skinner, William Leonard Pickard, and their clandestine LSD laboratory)
- Hamilton Morris and the Philosophers Stone: The Rise of Psychedelic Truffles in Amsterdam (about psilocybin-containing magic truffles in the Netherlands)
- Hamilton's Tanks for the Memories: Sensory Deprivation Tanks (about sensory deprivation tanks with Joe Rogan)
- The Ambien Effect: Medical Miracles With Ambien (about zolpidem treating brain damage)
- Swazi Gold / Swaziland: Gold Mine of Marijuana (about cannabis in Swaziland)
- Getting High on HIV Medication (efavirenz as a classical psychedelic)
- The Synthetic Marijuana Steampunk Rock Opera (about "legal highs" in New Zealand with Matt Bowden)

=== Hamilton's Pharmacopeia (TV series, Viceland, 2016–2021) ===
Morris published a TV series for Viceland with the following seasons and episodes:

==== Season 1 (2016) ====
- S1E1: The Story of the South African Quaalude (about recreational use of methaqualone in South Africa)
- S1E2: A Positive PCP Story (including Steve-O)
- S1E3: Shepherdess: The Story of Salvia Divinorum
- S1E4: Magic Mushrooms in Mexico (with Maria Sabina's son)
- S1E5: Fish N' Trips (about hallucinogenic fish and ichthyoallyeinotoxism)
- S1E6: The Lazy Lizard School of Hedonism (with Casey Hardison and Darrell Lemaire)

==== Season 2 (2018) ====
- S2E1: The Psychedelic Toad (about Bufo alvarius and the psychedelic toad pamphlet)
- S2E2: Peyote: The Divine Messenger
- S2E3: Kratom: The Forbidden Leaf
- S2E4: Wizards of DMT
- S2E5: Ketamine: Realms and Realities
- S2E6: A Clandestine Chemist's Tale (with Steve Gill, also about Hobart Huson (Strike) and The Hive)
- S2E7: A Fungal Fairy Tale (about Amanita muscaria, muscimol, and gaboxadol, with Povl Krogsgaard-Larsen and Carsten Höller)
- S2E8: The Cactus Apprentice (about the San Pedro cactus)

==== Season 3 (2021) ====
- S3E1: Synthetic Toad Venom Machine (about Bufo alvarius and the psychedelic toad pamphlet)
- S3E2: A Positive Methamphetamine Story (with Uncle Fester)
- S3E3: Xenon: The Perfect Anesthetic? (about Czech xenon clinics)
- S3E4: Natural Tramadol, Synthetic Ibogaine (about naturally occurring tramadol in Africa, recreational use of tramadol in Africa, entheogenic use of ibogaine in Africa, and chemical synthesis of ibogaine)
- S3E5: Bufotenine: In Search of Hataj (about bufotenin-containing hallucinogenic snuff in South America)
- S3E6: Ultra LSD (with Dan Panaccione about ergot, Amanda Feilding about trepanation and the Beckley Foundation, David E. Nichols about CE-LAD, and Bryan L. Roth about serotonin 5-HT_{2A} receptor ultra-large-scale docking (Ultra-LSD))

Morris also almost featured lysergamide producer Lizard Labs in the third season of the show.

=== Others ===
- Hamilton Morris (writer), Alexander Shulgin (subject), Ann Shulgin (guest), Jason Wallach (guest), David E. Nichols (guest), Rick Doblin (guest), Raffi Kahatchadorourian (guest), Wendy Tucker (guest), David Meyer (guest), Paul Daley (guest), Julie Holland (guest), others (19 June 2016). "The Love Drug". I Am Rebel. Season 1. Episode 3. National Geographic. Archived from the original on 23 November 2025.
- Hamilton Morris (director, cast) (20 August 2025). Synthesizing Ariadne in Alexander Shulgin's Lab. Hamilton Morris – via Patreon. Web page.
- Hamilton Morris (director, cast) (28 July 2026). The Chemistry of 7-OH. Hamilton Morris – via YouTube.

== Podcasts ==
=== The Hamilton Morris Podcast (2020–) ===
- The Hamilton Morris Podcast (some freely available, some on Patreon)

== Coverage and interviews ==
- Sciortino, Karley (22 November 2010). "Hamilton Morris, Prophet of Pharmacology". Interview Magazine.
- Simonini, Ross (10 February 2012). "A Psychonaut's Adventures in Videoland / Hamilton Morris's Web Series 'Hamilton's Pharmacopeia'". The New York Times.
- Hoby, Hermione (1 June 2012). "Hamilton Morris gets high for a living – and invites you to watch". the Guardian.
- Thulin, Lesley (7 August 2013). "Speaking with Psychonaut Hamilton Morris about sleep". New York Daily News. Archived from the original on October 4, 2025.
- Stephanie Foo; Glynn Washington (30 January 2015). "Mushroom Madness". NPR.
- Green, Penelope (10 June 2015). "Nesting, the Vice Media Way". The New York Times.
- Jonze, Tim (16 January 2017). "PCP to psychedelic fish: uncover the stories behind the world's strangest drugs". the Guardian.
- Gillespie, Nick; McDaniel, Mark; Garcia, Alexis (10 May 2019). "Hamilton Morris Is Changing the Way We Talk About Drugs". Reason.com.
- Gillespie, Nick (21 July 2019). "Psychonaut Hamilton Morris on Drugs After Prohibition". Reason.com.
- Gillespie, Nick (2 October 2019). "What Will Drugs Be Like After Prohibition? Q&A with Hamilton Morris". Reason.com.
- He, Quinn (1 April 2020). "Hamilton Morris is doing for drugs what Anthony Bourdain did for food". Massachusetts Daily Collegian.
- Halford, Bethany (31 December 2020). "Clandestine chemistry and psychoactive drugs in film: Hamilton Morris talks about his career". Chemical & Engineering News.
- Semley, John; Inquirer, For The (6 January 2021). "From USciences to Argentina and beyond, the son of filmmaker Errol Morris explores psychedelics for VICE TV". Inquirer.com.
- Siebert, Amanda (8 January 2021). "Hamilton Morris On Mistakes, 5-MeO-DMT And Preserving Psychedelic Toads". Forbes.
- Hampton, Justin (28 January 2021). "Better Living Through Chemistry: A Discussion with Hamilton Morris". Lucid News - Psychedelics, Consciousness Technology, and the Future of Wellness.
- Phelps, Hollis (21 June 2021). "Hulu's 'Hamilton's Pharmacopeia' Shows That We Can No Longer Ignore Connections Between Religion and Drugs". Religion Dispatches.
- Borislow, Sophie; Fortner, Holly (22 September 2022). ""Hamilton's Pharmacopeia": A deep dive into psychedelia • The Tulane Hullabaloo". The Tulane Hullabaloo.
- Prowse, Heydon (26 February 2024). "How the cult of Vice came crashing down". spiked.

=== Podcast and video interviews ===
- James Kent and Jake Kettle (7 January 2013). "DoseNation 03: Hamilton Morris". DoseNation Podcast (Podcast). No. 3. Hamilton Morris (guest). Archived from the original on 7 February 2013. Alt URL
- Joe Rogan (28 March 2013). "#177 - Hamilton Morris". The Joe Rogan Experience (Podcast). No. 177. Hamilton Morris (guest).
- "Longform Podcast #60: Hamilton Morris". Longform Podcast (Podcast). No. 60. Longform. 18 September 2013.
- Duncan Trussell (3 March 2017). "Hamilton Morris" (Podcast). The Duncan Trussell Family Hour. No. 231. Hamilton Morris (guest).
- Joe Rogan (27 June 2018). "#1136 - Hamilton Morris". The Joe Rogan Experience (Podcast). No. 1136. Hamilton Morris (guest).
- Tim Ferriss (20 September 2018). "Hamilton Morris on Better Living Through Chemistry: Psychedelics, Smart Drugs, and More". The Tim Ferriss Show (Podcast). No. 337. Hamilton Morris (guest). Transcript.
- Xavier Katana (20 May 2019). "Episode 98 – Hamilton Morris on Chemistry, Obscure Compounds and Working with VICELAND". The Human Experience Podcast (Podcast). Hamilton Morris (guest).
- Gillespie, Nick (2 October 2019). "What Will Drugs Be Like After Prohibition? Q&A with Hamilton Morris". Reason.com.
- Colin Pugh (host), Hamilton Morris (guest) (27 March 2020). Psychedelic Quarantine: A Conversation with Hamilton Morris and Colin Pugh. Brooklyn Psychedelic Society – via YouTube.
- Nick Jikomes (23 January 2021). "Psychedelics, Ibogaine, DMT, Ketamine, Hamilton's Pharmacopeia". Mind & Matter (Podcast). No. 6. Hamilton Morris (guest). Transcript.
- Duncan Trussell (12 February 2021). "Hamilton Morris". Duncan Trussell Family Hour (Podcast). No. 422. Hamilton Morris (guest).
- Joe Rogan (4 March 2021). "#1615 - Hamilton Morris". The Joe Rogan Experience (Podcast). No. 1615. Hamilton Morris (guest).
- Tim Ferriss (27 April 2021). "Hamilton Morris on Iboga, 5-MeO-DMT, the Power of Ritual, New Frontiers in Psychedelics, Excellent Problems to Solve, and More". The Tim Ferriss Show (Podcast). No. 511. Hamilton Morris (guest). Transcript.
- Mark Plotkin (1 July 2022). "Hamilton Morris and Dr. Mark Plotkin — Exploring the History of Psychoactive Substances, Synthetic vs. Natural Options, Microdosing, 5-MeO-DMT, The "Drunken Monkey" Hypothesis, Timothy Leary's Legacy, and More". The Tim Ferriss Show / Plants of the Gods (Podcast). No. 605 / S3E7, S3E8, Part 2. Hamilton Morris (guest). Transcript.
- Jack Wagner (2 September 2025). "Interview with Hamilton Morris". Otherworld (Podcast). No. 135. Hamilton Morris (guest).
- Shane Smith (25 September 2025). "The Hidden Side of Psychedelic Research ft. Hamilton Morris". Shane Smith Has Questions (Podcast). No. 10. Hamilton Morris (guest).
- Andrew Callaghan (27 September 2025). "The Fight for Legal MDMA - 5CAST (#12) ft. Hamilton Morris". 5CAST w/ Andrew Callaghan (Podcast). No. 12. Hamilton Morris (guest).
- Adam Moskowitz (2 October 2025). "Hamilton Morris: Why A Drugs Should Be Legalized + is Cheese a Drug? / Should All Drugs Be Legal?". A Cheese Course (Podcast). Hamilton Morris (guest).
- Dakota Brown (13 August 2026). "Season 9 Ep. 11 - Hamilton Morris". The Self Portrait Gospel (Podcast). No. Season 9, Ep. 11. Hamilton Morris (guest).

== See also ==
- Hamilton Morris
- Jason Wallach
- Bibliography of Alexander Shulgin
- Bibliography of Albert Hofmann
