= Uncle Fester (author) =

American chemist

Stephen Preisler
- Born: 1957 or 1958 (age 68–69)
- Other names: Uncle Fester, Steve Preisler
- Education: Marquette University (BS)
- Occupations: Author, chemist
- Notable work: Secrets of Methamphetamine Manufacture; Silent Death

Uncle Fester is the pen name of Stephen Preisler, author of such controversial books as Secrets of Methamphetamine Manufacture and Silent Death.

== Biography ==
Preisler gained underground fame after publishing his first book Secrets of Methamphetamine Manufacture in the early 1980s. He says that he got the nickname "Uncle Fester" from his college years, since he was very well known for producing explosives, and blowing things up, like the character in The Addams Family.

Preisler is an industrial chemist working in an electroplating factory he calls "the rat hole." In his spare time, he writes books. Preisler graduated in 1981 from Marquette University with a Chemistry & Biology degree. Two years later, he was arrested for methamphetamine possession and was sentenced to probation. He was arrested again in 1984 for methamphetamine charges, and put in the Waupun Correctional Institution. He says that the arrest was over a few grams of methamphetamine, but the Drug Enforcement Administration (DEA) brought back credit card information saying that he had been buying large quantities of ephedrine, which is a precursor for methamphetamine.

Outraged, Fester borrowed a typewriter from a fellow inmate, and began writing the manuscript for Secrets of Methamphetamine Manufacture. Loompanics Unlimited published the book, and it was an instant success. Secrets of Methamphetamine Manufacture is now in its eighth edition. It was one of Loompanics' best sellers. The book has information on how to produce crystal methamphetamine through six different methods. It also has data on how to synthesize MDMA or MDA, and how to synthesize methcathinone by oxidation of ephedrine. It also contains syntheses for precursor materials such as phenylacetone, ephedrine, methylamine, and alkyl nitrites. Previous editions of Secrets of Methamphetamine Manufacture have had some criticism: see for example Eleusis v. Fester for discussion between Fester and the past MDMA clandestine chemist Eleusis/Zwitterion.

=== Books ===
Uncle Fester has since written six other books:

- Home Workshop Explosives details how the underground chemist can easily manufacture explosives. It describes manufacture of nitroglycerin as well as syntheses for RDX, ammonium nitrate, blasting caps, nitroglycol, mannitol hexanitrate or nitromannitol, and PETN. It also has information on how to purify glycerin, how to synthesize nitric acid with minimal equipment, and how to make a fuel-air explosive (commonly known as an FAE). One reviewer of Home Workshop Explosives (David Harber, author of Guerrilla's Arsenal) notes that although the chemistry is solid, the chapter on detonation systems "borders on insanity."
- Silent Death describes routes for manufacturing nerve gases (such as tabun and sarin gas), botulinum (botulin toxin), ricin, phosgene, arsine, and other poisons.
- Vest Busters, Fester's smallest book, describes easy methods for manufacturing steel bullets using a lathe and methods of coating them with Teflon. Both velocity and the strength of a bullet's core are the two most significant factors in determining whether a bullet has armor-piercing capabilities. However, coating a bullet with Teflon has no effect on armor penetration, and that Fester's statement that "Coating a bullet with Teflon would raise it one level higher" is false. As well, hard armor would render handguns a moot point against the plate anyhow.
- Practical LSD Manufacture is one of Fester's more famous books. It deals with how one could manufacture a large quantity of LSD. This book is filled up with most of the hard-to-understand information on LSD syntheses that is currently available. The book has production information for the drug TMA-2 and plenty of information about how to isolate lysergic acid from morning glory seeds and other plant material. This work is not without its criticisms: the use of more outdated syntheses from the 1950s and 1960s, lacking the synthesis using POCl_{3} as a dehydrating reagent in the condensation between diethylamine and lysergic acid; the speculation about "Method X" is erroneous, as propionic anhydride is used in the synthesis of fentanyl analogues; and there is some confusion over stereoisomers by Fester. These criticisms are addressed in the third edition of the book.
- Advanced Techniques of Clandestine Psychedelic & Amphetamine Manufacture, an 'add-on' for Secrets of Methamphetamine Manufacture, provides a more advanced method of synthesizing methamphetamine using what is called "The Fester Formula," which describes how to manufacture methamphetamine through an electric synthesis. The book also covers many alternative methods for manufacturing phenylacetone and methylamine. One chapter of the book, "A Convenient Tabletop MDA Synthesis," describes an alternative method for synthesizing MDA in a small area such as a dorm room using raney nickel which is extremely dangerous.
- Bloody Brazilian Knife Fightin' Techniques, his newest book, covers methods for common fighting techniques from Brazil. Here Fester talks about some of his adventures in Brazil with some Brazilian friends and how he learned some lethal techniques in knife fighting. In an interview with Fox News it was described as a "flop", and Preisler said, "If it's not science, it's not selling. Never go outside of your genre".

Preisler was arrested at his home in Green Bay on July 14, 2023. He was charged on July 17.

== Documentary ==
Preisler was the object of the 40-minute documentary film "Friction", by Robert Ellman, made at a cost of approximately $300,000, whose premiere on Czech Television was cancelled after the September 11 attacks rendered the topic "politically incorrect".

Preisler was also featured in season 3 episode 2 of VICE's Hamilton's Pharmacopeia, which covered the production process, history, and several users' experience of methamphetamine.

== Books ==
- Advanced Techniques of Clandestine Psychedelic & Amphetamine Manufacture. ISBN 1-55950-174-X.
- Home Workshop Explosives, Second Edition. ISBN 0-9701485-4-2.
- Practical LSD Manufacture. ISBN 1-55950-123-5.
- Secrets of Methamphetamine Manufacture Sixth Edition with Recipes for MDA, Ecstacy, and other Psychedelic Amphetamines. ISBN 1-55950-223-1.
- Silent Death, Revised and Expanded Second Edition. ISBN 0-9701485-3-4.
- Vest Busters: How to Make your Own Body-Armor-Piercing Bullets. ISBN 0-9701485-1-8.
- Bloody Brazilian Knife Fightin' Techniques. ISBN 0-9701485-5-0.
