= Bufo Alvarius: the Psychedelic Toad of the Sonoran Desert =

Underground pamphlet written by Albert Most

- Author: Albert Most (Ken Nelson)
- Illustrator: Gail Patterson
- Language: English
- Subject: Sonoran Desert toad; 5-MeO-DMT; Psychedelic drugs
- Publisher: Venom Press
- Publication date: 1984
- Publication place: Denton, Texas, United States
- OCLC: 79477238
- Website: Internet Archive (PDF)

Bufo Alvarius: the Psychedelic Toad of the Sonoran Desert is an underground pamphlet written by Albert Most (real name Ken Nelson (1954–2019)), illustrated by Gail Patterson, and published by Venom Press in 1984. It described how to extract the venom of the Sonoran Desert toad (formerly Bufo alvarius, now Incilius alvarius), which contains the serotonergic psychedelic 5-MeO-DMT, and administer the venom to produce hallucinogenic effects. The pamphlet was responsible for the start of the recreational use of the toad venom and of 5-MeO-DMT. Subsequently, Andrew Weil and Wade Davis, in part citing the pamphlet, described the psychoactive effects of the toad in the scientific literature in 1992. In addition, they described the finding as the first instance of a psychedelic from an animal source to be discovered. Following the publication of the pamphlet, recreational use of the toads was encountered by the late 1980s and became a media sensation.

The pamphlet was originally published pseudonymously. Journalist Hamilton Morris described becoming obsessed with identifying the author of the pamphlet. Morris came upon a man named Alfred Savinelli, who claimed to be the author, and published this in his documentary series Hamilton's Pharmacopeia in 2017. Savinelli as the author, however, ultimately proved to be incorrect. The real author, Ken Nelson, subsequently contacted Morris and proved his identity. In 2020, a new episode of Hamilton's Pharmacopeia revealed Nelson as the true author, and Morris apologized for the mistake. Nelson died due to Parkinson's disease in 2019 prior to the airing. In 2021, with Nelson's permission, Morris (and two producers: Justin Clark and Soren Shade) published a revised and expanded edition of the pamphlet that included a chemical synthesis for 5-MeO-DMT. The inclusion of the synthesis of 5-MeO-DMT was prompted by concerns about endangerment and reduction of the toad population.

== See also ==
- List of psychedelic literature
- Psychedelic drug § History
- Seeking the Magic Mushroom (1957)
