= Bibliography of Albert Hofmann =

This is a bibliography, or list of publications, of Albert Hofmann, a Swiss chemist who studied ergot alkaloids and discovered LSD.

== Books ==
- Hofmann, Albert (1964). Die Mutterkornalkaloide [The Ergot Alkaloids]. Sammlung Chemischer und Chemisch-Technischer Beiträge, n. F. (in German). Vol. 60. Stuttgart: Ferdinand Enke Verlag. OCLC 7700870.
- Schultes, Richard Evans; Hofmann, Albert (1973). The Botany and Chemistry of Hallucinogens. Springfield, Illinois: Thomas. ISBN 978-0-398-02401-7. OCLC 628131. OL 5334409M.
- Wasson, Robert Gordon; Hofmann, Albert; Ruck, Carl A. P. (1978). The Road to Eleusis: Unveiling the Secret of the Mysteries. Ethno-Mycological Studies. Vol. 4. Harcourt, Brace, Jovanovich. ISBN 978-0-15-177872-0. OCLC 3239607. OL 4567666M. Archived from the original on 8 July 2022.
- Schultes RE, Hofmann A (1979). Plants of the Gods: Origins of Hallucinogenic Use. New York: McGraw-Hill. ISBN 978-0-07-056089-5. OCLC 6190695. OL 4409978M. Archive URL.
- Hofmann, Albert (1979). LSD, Mein Sorgenkind [LSD, My Problem Child] (in German). Stuttgart: Klett-Cotta. ISBN 978-3-12-923601-7. OCLC 6251390. OL 4184534M.
- Hofmann A (1986). Einsichten, Ausblicke: Essays [Insight, Outlook: Essays] (in German). Sphinx: Basel. ISBN 978-3-85914-633-4. OCLC 22593363. OL 2773335M.
- Hofmann A (1996). Lob des Schauens [In Praise of Looking] (in German). Burg, Switzerland: Privately published. OCLC 955008765. OL 31557041W.
- Hofmann, Albert (2011). Tun und Lassen: Essays, Gedanken und Gedichte [Doing and Not Doing: Essays, Thoughts and Poems] (in German). Solothurn: Nachtschatten Verlag. ISBN 978-3-03788-242-9. OCLC 811137512. OL 30701413M.

=== Translations ===
- Hofmann, Albert (1980). LSD, My Problem Child. Translated by Jonathan Ott. McGraw-Hill. ISBN 978-0-07-029325-0. OCLC 6251390. OL 4100124M.
- Hofmann, Albert (1989). Insight, Outlook. Atlanta: Humanics New Age. ISBN 978-0-89334-116-9. OCLC 18624267. OL 2060492M.
- Hofmann A (2011). LSD and the Divine Scientist: The Final Thoughts and Reflections of Albert Hofmann. Translated by Annabel Moynihan. Rochester, Vermont: Park Street Press. ISBN 978-1-62055-009-0. OCLC 806015879. OL 30399742M.
- Hofmann, Albert (2023). Ergot Alkaloids: Their History, Chemistry, and Therapeutic Uses. Translated by Nykodemová, Jitka. Berkeley/Santa Fe: Transform Press/Synergetic Press. ISBN 979-8-9874977-0-8. OCLC 1396063450.

== Book chapters ==
=== 1950s ===
- Heim R, Brack A, Kobel H, Hofmann A, Cailleux R (1958). "Psilocybine et Psilocine. Déterminisme de la Formation des Carpophores, et Éventuellement des Sclérotes, dans les Cultures des Agarics Hallucinogènes du Mexique et Mise en Évidence de la Psilocybine et de la Psilocine" [Psilocybin and Psilocin. Determination on the Formation of Fruiting Bodies and Sclerotia in Cultures of the Hallucinogenic Mushrooms of Mexico and Final Evidence of Psilocybin and Psilocin]. In Heim R, Wasson RG (eds.). Les Champignons Hallucinogènes du Mexique: Études Ethnologiques, Taxinomiques, Biologiques, Physiologiques et Chimiques. Archives du Muséum National d'Histoire Naturelle (in French). Vol. 7. Paris: Muséum National d'Histoire Naturelle. pp. 247–254. Archived from the original on 11 July 2025.
- Hofmann A (1958). "Psilocybine et Psilocine. La Psilocybine, principe actif psychotrope extrait du champignon hallucinogène Psilocybe mexicana Heim". In Heim R, Wasson RG (eds.). Les Champignons Hallucinogènes du Mexique: Études Ethnologiques, Taxinomiques, Biologiques, Physiologiques et Chimiques [Psilocybin and Psilocin. Psilocybin, the Principle Active Psycotropic Extract from the Hallucinogenic Mushroom: Psilocybe mexicana Heim]. Archives du Muséum National d'Histoire Naturelle (in French). Vol. 7. Paris: Muséum National d'Histoire Naturelle. pp. 255–257. Archived from the original on 11 July 2025.
- Heim R, Hofmann A (1958). "Psilocybine et Psilocine. La Psilocybine et la Psilocine Chez le Psilocybes et Strophaires Hallucinogenes". In Heim R, Wasson RG (eds.). Les Champignons Hallucinogènes du Mexique: Études Ethnologiques, Taxinomiques, Biologiques, Physiologiques et Chimiques. Archives du Muséum National d'Histoire Naturelle (in French). Vol. 7. Paris: Muséum National d'Histoire Naturelle. pp. 258–262. Archived from the original on 11 July 2025.
- Hofmann A, Frey A, Ott H, Petrzilka T, Troxler F (1958). "Psilocybine et Psilocine. Détermination de la Structure et Synthèse de la Psilocybine" [Psilocybin and Psilocin. Determination of Structure and Synthesis of Psilocybin]. In Heim R, Wasson RG (eds.). Les Champignons Hallucinogènes du Mexique: Études Ethnologiques, Taxinomiques, Biologiques, Physiologiques et Chimiques. Archives du Muséum National d'Histoire Naturelle (in French). Vol. 7. Paris: Muséum National d'Histoire Naturelle. pp. 263–267. Archived from the original on 11 July 2025.
- Hofmann A (1958). "Les effets psychiques. Rapport sur une auto-expérience avec le Psilocybe mexicana Heim" [Psychic effects. Report on a personal experiment with Psilocybe mexicana Heim]. In Heim R, Wasson RG (eds.). Les Champignons Hallucinogènes du Mexique: Études Ethnologiques, Taxinomiques, Biologiques, Physiologiques et Chimiques. Archives du Muséum National d'Histoire Naturelle (in French). Vol. 7. Paris: Muséum National d'Histoire Naturelle. pp. 278–280. Archived from the original on 11 July 2025.
- Hofmann A (1958). "The LSD-Psychosis: III. Lysergic Acid Diethylamide and Related Compounds. Relationship Between Spatial Arrangement and Mental Effects". In Rinkel M (ed.). Chemical Concepts of Psychosis: Proceedings of the Symposium on Chemical Concepts of Psychosis held at the Second International Congress of Psychiatry in Zurich, Switzerland, September 1 to 7, 1957. New York: McDowell, Obolensky. pp. 85–90. doi:10.1037/11190-006. Archived from the original on 4 June 2025.
- Hofmann A (1959). "Chemical Aspects of Psilocybin, the Psychotropic Principle from the Mexican Fungus, Psilocybe mexicana Heim". In Bradley PB, Deniker P, Radouco-Thomas C (eds.). Neuro-Psychopharmacology. Proceedings of the 1st International Congress of NeuroPsychopharmacology, Rome, September 1958. Amsterdam: Elsevier. pp. 446–448. OCLC 7694255. OL 6271700M. Archived from the original on 11 July 2025.

=== 1960s ===
- Stoll A, Hofmann A (1965). "The Ergot Alkaloids". In Manske RH (ed.). The Indole Alkaloids. The Alkaloids: Chemistry and Physiology. Vol. 8. Elsevier. pp. 725–783. doi:10.1016/s1876-0813(08)60060-3. ISBN 978-0-12-469508-5. OCLC 278540651. Archived from the original on 11 July 2025.
- Hofmann A (1966). "Alcaloïdes Indoliques Isolés de Plantes Hallucinogènes et Narcotiques du Mexique" [Indole Alkaloids Isolated from Mexican Hallucinogenic and Narcotic Plants]. Colloques Internationaux du Centre National de la Recherche Scientifique: Phytochimie et Plantes Médicinales des Terres du Pacifique, Noméa (Nouvelle Calédonie) 28.4-5.5.1964. Editions du Centre National de la Recherche Scientifique (in French). Vol. 144. Paris: Centre National de la Recherche Scientifique. pp. 223–241. OCLC 718094. OL 57361444M.
- Albert Hofmann (1968). "Psychotomimetic Agents". In Burger A (ed.). Drugs Affecting the Central Nervous System. Vol. 2. New York: M. Dekker. pp. 169–235. ISBN 978-0-7131-6055-0. OCLC 245452885. OL 13539506M.

=== 1970s ===
- Hofmann A (1970). "The Discovery of LSD and Subsequent Investigations on Naturally Occurring Hallucinogens". In Ayd FJ, Blackwell B (eds.). Discoveries in Biological Psychiatry. J.B. Lippincott Company. pp. 91–106. ISBN 978-0-397-59044-5. Archived from the original on 30 March 2025.
- Hofmann A (31 December 1972). "Ergot - A Rich Source of Pharmacologically Active Substances". In Swain T (ed.). Plants in the Development of Modern Medicine: Proceedings of a Symposium Held on May 8-10, 1968, in Cambridge, Massachusetts, and Sponsored by the Botanical Museum of Harvard University and the American Academy of Arts and Sciences. Harvard University Press. pp. 235–260. doi:10.4159/harvard.9780674865266.c9. ISBN 978-0-674-86526-6. Archived from the original on 11 July 2025.
- Hofmann (1975). "Chemistry of LSD / The Chemistry of LSD and its Modifications" (PDF). In Siva Sankar DV (ed.). LSD: A Total Study. Westbury, New York: RJD Publications. pp. 107–139. ISBN 978-0-9600290-3-7. OCLC 1582296. OL 5311161M.
- Hofmann A (1978). "History of the Basic Chemical Investigation on the Sacred Mushrooms of Mexico". In Ott J, Bigwood J (eds.). Teonanácatl: Hallucinogenic Mushrooms of North America: Extracts from the Second International Conference on Hallucinogenic Mushrooms, Held October 27-30, 1977, Near Port Townsend, Washington. Seattle, Washington: Madrona Publishers. pp. 47–61. ISBN 978-0-914842-32-3.
- Hofmann A (1978). "A Challenging Question and My Answer". In Wasson RG, Hofmann A, Ruck CA (eds.). The Road to Eleusis: Unveiling the Secret of the Mysteries. Ethno-Mycological Studies. Vol. 4. Harcourt, Brace, Jovanovich. pp. 25–34. ISBN 978-0-15-177872-0. OCLC 3239607. OL 4567666M.

=== 1980s ===
- Hofmann A (1981). "Die kulturhistorische Bedeutung halluzinogener Drogen". In Hein WG, Schramm G (eds.). Die Vorträge des Internationalen Pharmaziehistorischen Kongreßes Basel 1979: veranstaltet von der Internationalen Gesellschaft für Geschichte der Pharmazie e.V. in Basel von 13. bis 17. Juni 1979. Veröffentlichungen der Internationalen Gesellschaft für Geschichte der Pharmazie e.V. Vol. 50. Stuttgart: Wißenschaftliche Verlagsgesellschaft. pp. 159–164. ISBN 978-3-8047-0674-3. ISSN 0074-9729. OCLC 163738485.

=== 1990s ===
- A. Hofmann (15 August 1994). "History of the Discovery of LSD". In Pletscher A, Ladewig D (eds.). 50 Years of LSD: Current Status and Perspectives of Hallucinogens. A Symposium of the Swiss Academy of Medical Sciences, Lugano-Agno (Switzerland), October 21 and 22, 1993. New York: Parthenon Publishing Group. pp. 7–16. ISBN 978-1-85070-569-7. OCLC 30034178. OL 1084474M.
- Hofmann A (1995). "Medicinal Chemistry's Debt to Ethnobotany". In Schultes RE, von Reis S (eds.). Ethnobotany: Evolution of a Discipline. Portland, Oregon: Springer Netherlands. pp. 311–319. ISBN 978-0-412-72270-7.
- Hofmann A (1997). "The Message of the Eleusinian Mysteries for Today's World". In Forte R (ed.). Entheogens and the Future of Religion. Entheogen Project Series. Vol. 2. San Francisco: Council on Spiritual Practices. pp. 31–40. ISBN 978-1-889725-01-7. OCLC 37780657. OL 3583931M. Archived from the original on 11 July 2025.
- Hofmann A (1997). "Natural Science and the Mystical World View". In Forte R (ed.). Entheogens and the Future of Religion. Entheogen Project Series. Vol. 2. San Francisco: Council on Spiritual Practices. pp. 49–55. ISBN 978-1-889725-01-7. OCLC 37780657. OL 3583931M. Archived from the original on 11 July 2025.

=== 2000s ===
- Hofmann A (2001). "LSD as a Spiritual Aid". In Roberts TB (ed.). Psychoactive Sacramentals: Essays on Entheogens and Religion. Entheogen Project Series. Vol. 3. Council on Spiritual Practices. pp. 121–123. ISBN 978-1-889725-02-4. Archived from the original on 11 July 2025.
- Hofmann A (2005). "From Molecules to Mystery: Psychedelic Science, the Natural World, and Beyond". In Walsh R, Grob CS (eds.). Higher Wisdom: Eminent Elders Explore the Continuing Impact of Psychedelics. SUNY series in Transpersonal and Humanistic Psychology. Albany, New York: State University of New York Press. pp. 47–53. ISBN 978-0-7914-8296-4. Archived from the original on 11 July 2025.

== Journal articles ==
=== 1920s ===
- Karrer, P.; Hofmann, A. (1929). "Polysaccharide XXXIX. Über den enzymatischen Abbau von Chitin und Chitosan I" [The enzymic degradation of chitin and chitosan]. Helvetica Chimica Acta. 12 (1): 616–637. Bibcode:1929HChAc..12..616K. doi:10.1002/hlca.19290120167. ISSN 0018-019X.

=== 1930s ===
- Stoll, A.; Suter, E.; Kreis, W.; Bussemaker, B. B.; Hofmann, A. (1933). "Die herzaktiven Substanzen der Meerzwiebel. Scillaren A" [Heart-activating substances of squill. scillaren, I. Heart glucosides]. Helvetica Chimica Acta. 16 (1): 703–733. Bibcode:1933HChAc..16..703S. doi:10.1002/hlca.19330160198. ISSN 0018-019X.
- Stoll, A.; Kreis, W.; Hofmann, A. (1933). "Über Scillarenase. (3. Mitteilung über Herzglucoside)". Hoppe-Seyler's Zeitschrift für physiologische Chemie. 222 (1–2): 24–38. doi:10.1515/bchm2.1933.222.1-2.24. ISSN 0018-4888.
- Stoll, A.; Hofmann, A.; Helfenstein, A. (1934). "Die Natur der Sauerstoffatome im Scillaridin A. (6. Mitteilung über Herzglucoside)". Helvetica Chimica Acta. 17 (1): 641–664. Bibcode:1934HChAc..17..641S. doi:10.1002/hlca.19340170173. ISSN 0018-019X.
- Stoll, A.; Hofmann, A.; Kreis, W. (1934). "Die Doppelbindungen des Scillaridins A. (7. Mitteilung über Herzglucoside)". Helvetica Chimica Acta. 17 (1): 1334–1354. Bibcode:1934HChAc..17.1334S. doi:10.1002/hlca.193401701162. ISSN 0018-019X.
- Stoll, A.; Hofmann, A. (1935). "Umsetzungsprodukte von Scillaren A (8. Mitteilung über Herzglucoside)". Helvetica Chimica Acta. 18 (1): 82–95. Bibcode:1935HChAc..18...82S. doi:10.1002/hlca.19350180113. ISSN 0018-019X.
- Stoll, A.; Hofmann, A. (1935). "Die Hydrierung des Scillarens A und die physiologische Prüfung einiger Scillarenderivate 10. Mitteilung über Herzglucoside". Helvetica Chimica Acta. 18 (1): 401–419. Bibcode:1935HChAc..18..401S. doi:10.1002/hlca.19350180150. ISSN 0018-019X.
- Stoll, A.; Hofmann, A.; Helfenstein, A. (1935). "Die Identität der α-Scillansäure mit Allocholansäure. 11. Mitteilung über Herzglucoside". Helvetica Chimica Acta. 18 (1): 644–659. Bibcode:1935HChAc..18..644S. doi:10.1002/hlca.19350180184. ISSN 0018-019X.
- Stoll, A.; Hofmann, A.; Kreis, W. (1935). "Über glucosidspaltende Enzyme der Digitalisblätter. (12. Mitteilung über Herzglucoside)" [Cardiac glucosides. XII. Glucoside-splitting enzymes of digitalis leaves]. Hoppe-Seyler's Zeitschrift für physiologische Chemie. 235 (5–6): 249–264. doi:10.1515/bchm2.1935.235.5-6.249. ISSN 0018-4888.
- Stoll, A.; Hofmann, A.; Peyer, J. (1935). "Die Bruttoformeln des Scillaridins A und seiner Derivate (13. Mitteilung über Herzglucoside)". Helvetica Chimica Acta. 18 (1): 1247–1251. Bibcode:1935HChAc..18.1247S. doi:10.1002/hlca.193501801173. ISSN 0018-019X.
- Stoll, Arthur; Hofmann, Albert (1937). "Racemische Lysergsäure und ihre Auflösung in die optischen Antipoden. Zweite, vorläufige Mitteilung über Mutterkornalkaloide" [Racemic Lysergic Acid and Its Resolution of the Optical Antipodes. Second Preliminary Communication on Ergot Alkaloids]. Hoppe-Seyler's Zeitschrift für physiologische Chemie. 250 (1): 7–10. doi:10.1515/bchm2.1937.250.1.7. ISSN 0018-4888. Archived from the original on 11 July 2025.
- Stoll, Arthur; Hofmann., Albert (1938). "Partialsynthese des Ergobasins, eines natürlichen Mutterkornalkaloids sowie seines optischen Antipoden. 3. Mitteilung über Mutterkornalkaloide" [Partial Synthesis of Ergobasin, a Natural Ergot Alkaloid and Its Optical Antipodes. Part 3. On Ergot Alkaloids]. Hoppe-Seyler's Zeitschrift für physiologische Chemie (in German). 251 (1–6). Walter de Gruyter GmbH: 155–163. doi:10.1515/bchm2.1938.251.1-6.155. ISSN 0018-4888. Archived from the original on 11 July 2025.

=== 1940s ===
- Stoll, A.; Hofmann, A. (3 May 1943). "Die optisch aktiven Hydrazide der Lysergsäure und der Isolysergsäure. (4. Mitteilung über Mutterkornalkaloide)" [The Optically Active Hydazide of Lysergic Acid and Isolysergic Acid. (Part 4. About Ergot Alkaloids)]. Helvetica Chimica Acta. 26 (3): 922–928. Bibcode:1943HChAc..26..922S. doi:10.1002/hlca.19430260324. ISSN 0018-019X. Archived from the original on 11 July 2025.
- Stoll, A.; Peyer, J.; Hofmann, A. (3 May 1943). "Synthese von optisch aktiven α-Amino-alkoholen. (5. Mitteilung über Mutterkornalkaloide)" [Synthesis of Optically Active α-Amino Alcohols. (5. Communication on Ergot Alkaloids)]. Helvetica Chimica Acta. 26 (3): 929–943. doi:10.1002/hlca.19430260325. ISSN 0018-019X. Archived from the original on 11 July 2025.
- Stoll, A.; Hofmann, A. (3 May 1943). "Partialsynthese von Alkaloiden vom Typus des Ergobasins. (6. Mitteilung über Mutterkornalkaloide)" [Partial Synthesis of Alkaloids of the Ergonovine Type. (Part 6. On Ergot Alkaloids)]. Helvetica Chimica Acta. 26 (3): 944–965. Bibcode:1943HChAc..26..944S. doi:10.1002/hlca.19430260326. ISSN 0018-019X.
- Stoll, A.; Hofmann, A. (2 August 1943). "Die Alkaloide der Ergotoxingruppe: Ergocristin, Ergokryptin und Ergocornin. (7. Mitteilung über Mutterkornalkaloide)" [The Alkaloids of the Ergotoxin Group: Ergocristine, Ergocryptine and Ergocornine (Part 7. On Ergot Alkaloids)]. Helvetica Chimica Acta. 26 (5): 1570–1601. Bibcode:1943HChAc..26.1570S. doi:10.1002/hlca.19430260522. ISSN 0018-019X. Archived from the original on 11 July 2025.
- Stoll, A.; Hofmann, A.; Becker, B. (2 August 1943). "Die Spaltstücke von Ergocristin, Ergokryptin und Ergocornin. (8. Mitteilung über Mutterkornalkaloide)" [The Fragments of Ergocristine, Ergocryptine and Ergocornine. (Part 8. On Ergot Alkaloids)]. Helvetica Chimica Acta. 26 (5): 1602–1613. Bibcode:1943HChAc..26.1602S. doi:10.1002/hlca.19430260523. ISSN 0018-019X. Archived from the original on 11 July 2025.
- Stoll, A.; Hofmann, A. (15 October 1943). "Die Dihydroderivate der natürlichen linksdrehenden Mutterkornalkaloide. (9. Mitteilung über Mutterkornalkaloide)" [The Dihydro- Derivatives of Natural Left-Turning Ergot Alkaloids (Part 9. About Ergot Alkaloids)]. Helvetica Chimica Acta. 26 (6): 2070–2081. Bibcode:1943HChAc..26.2070S. doi:10.1002/hlca.19430260633. ISSN 0018-019X. Archived from the original on 11 July 2025.
- Stoll, A.; Hofmann, A.; Petrzilka, T. (1946). "Die Dihydroderivate der rechtsdrehenden Mutterkornalkaloide (11. Mitteilung über Mutterkornalkaloide)" [The Dihydro- Derivatives of Right-Turning Ergot Alkaloids. (Part 11. On Ergot Alkaloids)]. Helvetica Chimica Acta. 29 (3): 635–653. Bibcode:1946HChAc..29..635S. doi:10.1002/hlca.19460290315. ISSN 0018-019X. Archived from the original on 11 July 2025.
- Hofmann A (February 1947). "Über den Curtius 'schen Abbau der isomeren Lysergsäuren und Dihydro-lysergsäuren. (12. Mitteilung über Mutterkornalkaloide" [About Curtius degradation of the isomeric lysergic and dihydrolysergic acids; 12th report on ergot alkaloids]. Helv Chim Acta (in German). 30 (1): 44–51. Bibcode:1947HChAc..30...44H. doi:10.1002/hlca.19470300108. PMID 20294131.
- Stoll A, Hofmann A, Troxler F (March 1949). "Über die Isomerie von Lysergsäure und Isolysergsäure. 14. Mitteilung über Mutterkornalkaloide" [About Isomers of Lysergic Acid and Isolysergic Acid. (Part 14. About Ergot Alkaloids)]. Helv Chim Acta (in German). 32 (2): 506–521. Bibcode:1949HChAc..32..506S. doi:10.1002/hlca.19490320219. PMID 18116964. Archived from the original on 11 July 2025.
- Stoll, A.; Hofmann, A.; Schlientz, W. (15 October 1949). "Die stereoisomeren Lysergole und Dihydro-lysergole. 15. Mitteilung über Mutterkornalkaloide". Helvetica Chimica Acta. 32 (6): 1947–1956. Bibcode:1949HChAc..32.1947S. doi:10.1002/hlca.19490320622. ISSN 0018-019X.

=== 1950s ===
- Stoll, A.; Hofmann, A.; Jucker, E.; Petrzilka, T.; Rutschmann, J.; Troxler, F. (1950). "Peptide der isomeren Lysergsäuren und Dihydro-lysergsäuren. 18. Mitteilung über Mutterkornalkaloide" [Peptide Isomers of Lysergic Acid and Dihydro-Lysergic Acid. (Part 18. About Ergot Alkaloids)]. Helvetica Chimica Acta. 33 (1): 108–116. Bibcode:1950HChAc..33..108S. doi:10.1002/hlca.19500330119. ISSN 0018-019X. Archived from the original on 11 July 2025.
- Stoll, A.; Hofmann, A. (1950). "Zur Kenntnis des Polypeptidteils der Mutterkornalkaloide II. (partielle alkalische Hydrolyse der Mutterkornalkaloide). 20. Mitteilung über Mutterkornalkaloide" [Contribution to the Knowledge of the Polypeptide Portion of the Ergot Alkaloids II. (Partial Alkaline Hydrolysis of the Ergot Alkaloids). (Part 20. On Ergot Alkaloids)]. Helvetica Chimica Acta. 33 (6): 1705–1711. Bibcode:1950HChAc..33.1705S. doi:10.1002/hlca.19500330639. ISSN 0018-019X. Archived from the original on 11 July 2025.
- Stoll, A.; Hofmann, A.; Petrzilka, T. (1951). "Die Konstitution der Mutterkornalkaloide. Struktur des Peptidteils. III. 24. Mitteilung über Mutterkornalkaloide" [The Constitution of the Ergot Alkaloids. Structure of the Peptide Portion III. (Part 24. About Ergot Alkaloids)]. Helvetica Chimica Acta. 34 (5): 1544–1576. Bibcode:1951HChAc..34.1544S. doi:10.1002/hlca.19510340539. ISSN 0018-019X. Archived from the original on 11 July 2025.
- Stoll, A.; Troxler, F.; Hofmann, A (2 May 1952). "Über die Umwandlung von 6-Methyl-8-amino-ergolin in 6-Methyl-8-oxy-ergolin. 29. Mitteilung über Mutterkornalkaloide". Helvetica Chimica Acta. 35 (4): 1259–1263. doi:10.1002/hlca.19520350422. ISSN 0018-019X.
- Hofmann A (1953). "La estructura del ácido lisérgico" [The structure of lysergic acid]. Farmacognosia (in Spanish). 13 (30): 311–331. PMID 13173564.
- Hofmann A (1953). "La constitución de los alcaloides del cornezuelo de centeno" [Constitution of ergot alkaloids]. Farmacognosia (in Spanish). 13 (30): 333–355. PMID 13173565.
- Stoll, A.; Hofmann, A. (1953). "Sarpagin, ein neues Alkaloid aus Rauwolfia serpentina Benth". Helvetica Chimica Acta. 36 (5): 1143–1147. Bibcode:1953HChAc..36.1143S. doi:10.1002/hlca.19530360527. ISSN 0018-019X.
- Hofmann, A. (January 1954). "Rauhimbin und Isorauhimbin, zwei neue Alkaloide aus Rauwolfia serpentina Benth. 2. Mitteilung über Rauwolfia-Alkaloide". Helvetica Chimica Acta. 37 (1): 314–320. Bibcode:1954HChAc..37..314H. doi:10.1002/hlca.19540370140. eISSN 1522-2675. ISSN 0018-019X.
- Hofmann, A. (January 1954). "Die Isolierung weiterer Alkaloide aus Rauwolfia serpentina Benth. 3. Mitteilung über Rauwolfia-Alkaloide". Helvetica Chimica Acta. 37 (3): 849–865. Bibcode:1954HChAc..37..849H. doi:10.1002/hlca.19540370326. eISSN 1522-2675. ISSN 0018-019X.
- Le Hir, A.; Goutarel, R.; Janot, M.-M.; Hofmann, A. (January 1954). "Sur la constitution de l'isorauhimbine". Helvetica Chimica Acta. 37 (7): 2161–2165. Bibcode:1954HChAc..37.2161L. doi:10.1002/hlca.19540370728. eISSN 1522-2675. ISSN 0018-019X.
- Stoll A, Hofmann A, Brunner R (January 1954). "Uber ein Neues Alkaloid vom Typus der Mutterkorn-Alkaloide". Angewandte Chemie. 66 (23): 748.
- Stoll, A.; Rutschmann, J.; Hofmann, A. (1954). "Über die Synthese von 14C-Diäthylamin und 14C-Lysergsäure-diäthylamid. 34. Mitteilung über Mutterkornalkaloide" [Regarding the Synthesis of 14C-Diethylamine and 14C-Lysergic Acid Diethylamide]. Helvetica Chimica Acta. 37 (3): 820–824. doi:10.1002/hlca.19540370322. ISSN 0018-019X. Archived from the original on 11 July 2025.
- Stoll, A.; Brack, A.; Kobel, H.; Hofmann, A.; Brunner, R. (1954). "Die Alkaloide eines Mutterkornpilzes von Pennisetum typhoideum Rich . und deren Bildung in saprophytischer Kultur. 36. Mitteilung über Mutterkornalkaloide". Helvetica Chimica Acta. 37 (6): 1815–1825. Bibcode:1954HChAc..37.1815S. doi:10.1002/hlca.19540370627. ISSN 0018-019X.
- Stoll, A.; Petrzilka, T.; Rutschmann, J.; Hofmann, A.; Günthard, Hs. H. (1954). "Über die Stereochemie der Lysergsäuren und der Dihydro-lysergsäuren. 37. Mitteilung über Mutterkornalkaloide" [The Stereochemistry of Lysergic Acid and Dihydro-Lysergic Acid. (Part 37. About Ergot Alkaloids)]. Helvetica Chimica Acta. 37 (7): 2039–2057. Bibcode:1954HChAc..37.2039S. doi:10.1002/hlca.19540370716. ISSN 0018-019X. Archived from the original on 11 July 2025.
- Hofmann A (1955). "Discovery of d-lysergic acid diethylamide--LSD". Sandoz Excerpta. 1 (12): 1–. Archived from the original on 11 July 2025.
- Hofmann A (1955). "The history of LSD 25 (lysergic acid diethylamide)". Sandoz J Med Sci. 2: 117–124.
- Hofmann A (1955). "Die Geschichte des LSD-25". Triangel Sandoz Z. Med. Wiss. 2: 117–.
- Stoll, A.; Hofmann, A.; Brunner, R. (1955). "Alkaloide aus den Blättern von Rauwolfia canescens L . 4. Mitteilung über Rauwolfia-Alkaloide". Helvetica Chimica Acta. 38 (1): 270–283. Bibcode:1955HChAc..38..270S. doi:10.1002/hlca.19550380133. ISSN 0018-019X.
- Stoll, A.; Hofmann, A. (1955). "Amide der stereoisomeren Lysergsäuren und Dihydro-lysergsäuren. 38. Mitteilung über Mutterkornalkaloide" [The Stereoisomeric Amides of Lysergic Acid and Dihydro-Lysergsic Acid. (Part 38. About Ergot Alkaloids)]. Helvetica Chimica Acta. 38 (2): 421–433. Bibcode:1955HChAc..38..421S. doi:10.1002/hlca.19550380207. ISSN 0018-019X. Archived from the original on 11 July 2025.
- Hofmann, A. (January 1955). "β-Yohimbin aus den Wurzeln von Rauwolfia canescens L. 6. Mitteilung über Rauwolfia-Alkaloide". Helvetica Chimica Acta. 38 (2): 536–538. doi:10.1002/hlca.19550380223. eISSN 1522-2675. ISSN 0018-019X.
- Stoll, A.; Troxler, F.; Peyer, J.; Hofmann, A. (1955). "Eine neue Synthese von Bufotenin und verwandten Oxy-tryptaminen. 40. Mitteilung über Mutterkornalkaloide" [A New Synthesis of Bufotenine and Related Oxytryptamines. (Part 40. On Ergot Alkaloids)]. Helvetica Chimica Acta. 38 (6): 1452–1472. Bibcode:1955HChAc..38.1452S. doi:10.1002/hlca.19550380619. ISSN 0018-019X. Archived from the original on 11 July 2025.
- Stoll, A.; Hofmann, A. (1 February 1955). "Canescine and Pseudoyohimbine from the Roots of Rauwolfia Canescens L. 1". Journal of the American Chemical Society. 77 (3): 820–821. Bibcode:1955JAChS..77..820S. doi:10.1021/ja01608a102. ISSN 0002-7863.
- Stoll A, Hofmann A (1955). "Alkaloids from the leaves and roots of Rauwolfia canescens". Soc Biol Chemists, India: 248–258.
- Stoll, A.; Hofmann, A.; Leemann, H. G.; Ott, H.; Schenk, H. R. (1956). "Synthese der sauren Peptidreste und der thermischen Spaltprodukte von Mutterkornalkaloiden. 41. Mitteilung über Mutterkornalkaloide". Helvetica Chimica Acta. 39 (4): 1165–1171. Bibcode:1956HChAc..39.1165S. doi:10.1002/hlca.19560390420. ISSN 0018-019X.
- Stauffacher, D.; Hofmann, A.; Seebeck, E. (January 1957). "Über Sarpagin. 7. Mitteilung über Rauwolfia-Alkaloide". Helvetica Chimica Acta. 40 (2): 508–513. Bibcode:1957HChAc..40..508S. doi:10.1002/hlca.19570400233. eISSN 1522-2675. ISSN 0018-019X.
- Hoffmann, A.; Brunner, R.; Kobel, H.; Brack, A. (1957). "Neue Alkaloide aus der saprophytischen Kultur des Mutterkornpilzes von Pennisetum typhoideum Rich. 42. Mitteilung über Mutterkornalkaloide". Helvetica Chimica Acta. 40 (5): 1358–1373. Bibcode:1957HChAc..40.1358H. doi:10.1002/hlca.19570400526. ISSN 0018-019X.
- Troxler, F.; Hofmann, A. (1957). "Substitutionen am Ringsystem der Lysergsäure I. Substitutionen am Indol-Stickstoff. 43. Mitteilung über Mutterkornalkaloide" [Substitutions on the Ring System of Lysergic Acid. I. Substitutions in the Indole Nitrogen. (43. Communication on Ergot Alkaloids)]. Helvetica Chimica Acta. 40 (6): 1706–1720. Bibcode:1957HChAc..40.1706T. doi:10.1002/hlca.19570400619. ISSN 0018-019X. Archived from the original on 11 July 2025.
- Troxler, F.; Hofmann, A. (1957). "Substitutionen am Ringsystem der Lysergsäure II. Alkylierung. 44. Mitteilung über Mutterkornalkaloide" [Substitutions on the Ring System of Lysergic Acid II. Alkylation. (44. Notes on Ergot Alkaloids)]. Helvetica Chimica Acta. 40 (6): 1721–1732. Bibcode:1957HChAc..40.1721T. doi:10.1002/hlca.19570400620. ISSN 0018-019X. Archived from the original on 11 July 2025.
- Hofmann, A.; Frey, A. J. (January 1957). "Isolierung weiterer Alkaloide aus Rauwolfia vomitoria Afz. Vomalidin, ein neues Alkaloid der Ajmalin-Gruppe. 8. Mitteilung über Rauwolfia-Alkaloide". Helvetica Chimica Acta. 40 (6): 1866–1874. doi:10.1002/hlca.19570400637. eISSN 1522-2675. ISSN 0018-019X.
- Troxler, F.; Hofmann, A. (1957). "Substitutionen am Ringsystem der Lysergsäure. III. Halogenierung. 45. Mitteilung über Mutterkornalkaloide" [Ergot Alkaloids XLV. Substitution in The Ring System of Lysergic acid. 3. Halogenation]. Helvetica Chimica Acta. 40 (7): 2160–2170. Bibcode:1957HChAc..40.2160T. doi:10.1002/hlca.19570400716. ISSN 0018-019X.
- Hofmann, A. (1957). "Die Chemie der Rauwolfia-Alkaloide unter Berücksichtigung Neuester Ergebnisse". Planta Medica. 5 (5/06): 145–155. Bibcode:1957PlMed...5..145H. doi:10.1055/s-0028-1101705. ISSN 0032-0943.
- Goutarel, R.; Hofmann, A.; Janot, M.-M.; Le Hir, A.; Neuss, N. (1957). "Identité de l'isorauhimbine et de la 3-épi-α-yohimbine". Helvetica Chimica Acta. 40 (1): 156–160. doi:10.1002/hlca.19570400118. ISSN 0018-019X.
- Hofmann A, Heim R, Brack A, Kobel H (March 1958). "Psilocybin, ein psychotroper Wirkstoff aus dem mexikanischen Rauschpilz Psilocybe mexicana Heim" [Psilocybin, a Psychotropic Drug from the Mexican Mushroom Psilocybe mexicana Heim]. Experientia (in German). 14 (3): 107–109. doi:10.1007/BF02159243. PMID 13537892. Archived from the original on 11 July 2025.
- Hofmann, A. (1958). "Die Chemie der Mutterkornalkaloide". Planta Medica. 6 (4): 381–394. Bibcode:1958PlMed...6..381H. doi:10.1055/s-0028-1101662. ISSN 0032-0943.
- Hofmann A, Frey A, Ott H, Petrzilka T, Troxler F (November 1958). "Konstitutionsaufklärung und Synthese von Psilocybin" [Structural Clarification and Synthesis of Psilocybin]. Experientia (in German). 14 (11): 397–399. doi:10.1007/BF02160424. PMID 13609599. Archived from the original on 11 July 2025.
- Heim R, Brack A, Kobel H, Hofmann A, Cailleux R (1958). "Déterminisme de la formation des carpophores et des sclèrotes dans la culture du Psilocybe mexicana Heim, et Agaric hallucinogène du Mexique, mise en évidence de la psilocybine et de la psilocine" [Determination of the Formation of Fruiting Bodies and Sclerotia in Cultures of Psilocybe mexicana Heim, the Hallucinogenic Mushroom of Mexico, and Evidence of Psilocybin and Psilocin]. Revue de Mycologie. 22: 9–16. Archived from the original on 11 July 2025.
- Hofmann A, Heim R, Brack A, Kobel H (1958). "Psilocybin ein psychotroper Wirkstoff aus dem mexikanischen Rauschpilz" [Psilocybin, a Psychotropic Substance from a Mexican Mushroom]. Revue de Mycologie. 22: 17–21. Archived from the original on 11 July 2025.
- Heim R, Hofmann A (1958). "Isolement de la psilocybine à partir du Stropharia cubensis Earler et d'autres espèces de champignons hallucinogènes mexicains appartenant au genre Psilocybe" [Isolation of Psilocybin from Stropharia cubensis Earler and Other Species of Hallucinogenic Mexican Fungi Belonging to the Genus Psilocybe]. Revue de Mycologie. 22: 24–28. Archived from the original on 11 July 2025.
- Heim R, Brack A, Kobel H, Hofmann A, Cailleux R (1958). "Determinisme de la formation des carpophores et des sclerotes dans la culture de Psilocybe mexicana Heim, Agaric hallucinogenic du Mexique, et mise en evidence de la psilocybine et de la psilocine" [The determination of the formation of the carpophores and sclerotia in culture of Psilocybe mexicana Heim, a Mexican, hallucinogenic agaric, and the demonstration of the presence of psilocybin and psilocin]. Revue de Mycologie (in French). 23 (1): 106–113.
- Hofmann A, Heim R, Brack A, Kobel H (1958). "Psilocybin, an active psychotropic material from the Mexican hallucinogenic fungus" [Psilocybin, an active psychotropic material from the Mexican hallucinogenic fungus]. Revue de Mycologie (in French). 23 (1): 114–118.
- Heim R, Hofmann A (1958). "Isolement de la psilocybine a partir du Stro-pharia cubensis Earle et d'autres especes de champignons hallucinogenes mexicains appartenant au genre Psilocybe" [Isolation of psilocybin from S. cubensis and other species of Mexican hallucination-producing fungi of the genus Psilocybe]. Revue de Mycologie. 23 (3): 347–351.
- Heim R, Brack A, Kobel H, Hofmann A, Cailleux R (March 1958). "Determinisme de la formation des carpophores et des sclérotes dans la culture du Psilocybe mexicana Heim, agaric hallucinogène du Mexique, et mise en évidence de la psilocybine et de la psilocine" [Determination of the Formation of Fruiting Bodies and Sclerotia in Cultures of Psilocybe mexicana Heim, the Hallucinogenic Mushroom of Mexico, and Evidence of Psilocybin and Psilocin]. C R Hebd Séances Acad Sci (in French). 246 (9): 1346–1351. PMID 13537389. Archived from the original on 11 July 2025.
- Heim R, Hofmann A (1958). "Isolement de la Psilocybine à partir du Stropharia cubensis Earle et d'autres espèces de champignons hallucinogènes mexicains appartenant au genre Psilocybe" [Isolation of Psilocybin from Stropharia cubensis Earler and Other Species of Hallucinogenic Mexican Fungi Belonging to the Genus Psilocybe]. Comptes Rendus Hebdomadaires des Séances de l'Académie des Sciences. 247 (5): 557–561. Archived from the original on 11 July 2025.
- Hofmann A (1959). "Les alcaloides de psilocybe mexicana". Experientia. 15 (3): 101–106. doi:10.1007/BF02166696. PMID 13652944.
- Hofmann A, Troxler F (March 1959). "Identifizierung von Psilocin" [Identification of psilocin]. Experientia (in German). 15 (3): 101–102. doi:10.1007/BF02166696. PMID 13652944.
- Hofmann A (June 1959). "Psychotomimetic Drugs: Chemical and Pharmacological Aspects" (PDF). Acta Physiol Pharmacol Neerl. 8: 240–258. PMID 13852489.
- Troxler, F.; Seemann, F.; Hofmann, A. (1959). "Abwandlungsprodukte von Psilocybin und Psilocin. 2. Mitteilung über synthetische Indolverbindungen" [Derivative Products of Psilocin and Psilocybin (2. Communication on Synthetic Indole Connections)]. Helvetica Chimica Acta. 42 (6). Wiley: 2073–2103. Bibcode:1959HChAc..42.2073T. doi:10.1002/hlca.19590420638. ISSN 0018-019X. Archived from the original on 11 July 2025.
- Hofmann, A.; Heim, R.; Brack, A.; Kobel, H.; Frey, A.; Ott, H.; Petrzilka, T.; Troxler, F. (1959). "Psilocybin und Psilocin, zwei psychotrope Wirkstoffe aus mexikanischen Rauschpilzen" [Psilocybin and Psilocin, Two Psychotropic Substances from Mexican Mushrooms]. Helvetica Chimica Acta. 42 (5). Wiley: 1557–1572. Bibcode:1959HChAc..42.1557H. doi:10.1002/hlca.19590420518. ISSN 0018-019X. Archived from the original on 11 July 2025.
- Troxler, F.; Hofmann, A. (1959). "Oxydation von Lysergsäure-Derivaten in 2,3-Stellung. 47. Mitteilung über Mutterkornalkaloide". Helvetica Chimica Acta. 42 (3): 793–802. doi:10.1002/hlca.19590420321. ISSN 0018-019X.

=== 1960s ===
- Hofmann A (1960). "Psychotomimetica. Chemische, pharmakologische und medizinische Aspekte: Eine Uebersicht" [Psychotomimetica. Chemical, Pharmacological and Medical Aspects: An Overview]. Svensk Kemisk Tidskrift. 72 (12): 723–747. Archived from the original on 11 July 2025.
- Hofmann A (1960). "Die psychotropen Wirkstoffe der mexikanischen Zauberpilze" [The Active Psychotropic Substances in Mexican Mushrooms]. Verhandl. Naturf. Ges. Basel. 71 (2): 239–256. Archived from the original on 11 July 2025.
- Hofmann A (1960). "Die psychotropen Wirkstoffe der mexikanischen Zauberpilze". CHIMIA. 14 (9): 309–318. doi:10.2533/chimia.1960.309. Archived from the original on 11 July 2025.
- Hofmann A, Tscherter H (September 1960). "Isolierung von Lysergsäure-Alkaloiden aus der mexikanischen Zauberdroge Ololiuqui (Rivea corymbosa (L.) Hall. f.)" [Isolation of lysergic acid alkaloids from the Mexican drug ololiuqui (Rivea corymbosa (L.) Hall.f.)]. Experientia (in German). 16 (9): 414–416. doi:10.1007/BF02178840. PMID 13715089.
- Hofmann A (1961). "Die Erforschung der mexikanischen Zauberpilze" [An Investigation of Mexican Magic Mushrooms]. Schweizerische Zeitschrift für Pilzkunde. 39 (1): 1–10. Archived from the original on 11 July 2025.
- Hofmann A (April 1961). "Psychotomimetics. Chemical, pharmacological and clinical aspects". Indian Med J. 55: 84–85. PMID 13715091.
- Hofmann A (1961). "Psychotomimetics, chemical, pharmacological and clinical aspects". The Indian Practitioner. 14: 195–197. Archived from the original on 11 July 2025.
- Hofmann A (September 1961). "Chemical pharmacological and medical aspects of psychotomimetics". J Exp Med Sci. 5: 31–51. PMID 13908156. Archived from the original on 11 July 2025.
- Hofmann A, Frey AJ, Ott H (May 1961). "Die Totalsynthese des Ergotamins" [The total synthesis of ergotamine]. Experientia (in German). 17 (5): 206–207. doi:10.1007/BF02160615. PMID 13715088.
- Schlientz W, Brunner R, Hofmann A, Berde B, Stuermer E (July 1961). "Umlagerung von Mutterkornalkaloid-Präparaten in schwach sauren Lösungen. Pharmakologische Wirkungen der Isomerisierungsprodukte" [Transformation of ergot alkaloid preparations in weak acid solutions. Pharmacological action of isomerization products. 51. On ergot alkaloids]. Pharm Acta Helv (in German). 36: 472–488. PMID 13747820.
- Brack, A.; Hofmann, A.; Kalberer, F.; Kobel, H.; Rutschmann, J. (1961). "Tryptophan als biogenetische Vorstufe des Psilocybins" [Tryptophan as a Biogenetic Precursor of Psilocybin]. Archiv der Pharmazie. 294 (4): 230–234. doi:10.1002/ardp.19612940406. ISSN 0365-6233.
- Hofmann A, Cerletti A (May 1961). "Die Wirkstoffe der dritten aztekischen Zauberdroge - oder die Lösung des „Ololiuqui"-Rätsels" [Active substances of the 3rd Aztec magic drug or solution of the "Ololiuqui" puzzle]. Dtsch Med Wochenschr (in German). 86 (18): 885–888. doi:10.1055/s-0028-1112871. PMID 13715087.
- Schlientz W, Brunner R, Thudium F, Hofmann A (March 1961). "Eine neue Isomerisierungsreaktion der Mutterkornalkaloide vom Peptidtypus" [A new isomerization reaction of ergot alkaloids of the peptide type]. Experientia (in German). 17 (3): 108. doi:10.1007/BF02160811. PMID 13747821.
- Hofmann A (December 1961). "Die Wirkstoffe der Mexikanischen Zauberdroge "Ololiuqui"" [The Active Ingredients in the Mexican Ceremonial Drug "Ololiuqui"]. Planta Medica. 9 (4): 354–367. doi:10.1055/s-0028-1100366. Archived from the original on 11 July 2025.
- Taylor, W. I.; Frey, A. J.; Hofmann, A. (January 1962). "Vomilenin und seine Umwandlung in Perakin". Helvetica Chimica Acta. 45 (2): 611–614. Bibcode:1962HChAc..45..611T. doi:10.1002/hlca.19620450225. eISSN 1522-2675. ISSN 0018-019X.
- Stadler, P. A.; Hofmann, A. (1962). "Chemische Bestimmung der absoluten Konfiguration der Lysergsäure 54. Mitteilung über Mutterkornalkaloide" [Chemical Determination of the Absolute Configuration of Lysergic Acid. 54. Communication on Ergot]. Helvetica Chimica Acta. 45 (6): 2005–2011. Bibcode:1962HChAc..45.2005S. doi:10.1002/hlca.19620450636. ISSN 0018-019X. Archived from the original on 11 July 2025.
- Bhattacharji, S.; Birch, A. J.; Brack, A.; Hofmann, A.; Kobel, H.; Smith, D. C. C.; Smith, Herchel; Winter, J. (1962). "79. Studies in relation to biosynthesis. Part XXVII. The biosynthesis of ergot alkaloids". Journal of the Chemical Society (Resumed): 421. doi:10.1039/jr9620000421. ISSN 0368-1769.
- Hofmann A, Cerletti A (1963). "Wonder-Drug". Physician's Panorama. 1: 26–29.
- Cerletti A, Hofmann A (January 1963). "Mushrooms and toadstools". Lancet. 1 (7271): 58–59. doi:10.1016/s0140-6736(63)91193-0. PMID 14019696. Archived from the original on 11 July 2025.
- Hofmann A (1963). "The Active Principles of the Seeds of Rivea Corymbosa and Ipomoea Violacea". Botanical Museum Leaflets, Harvard University. 20 (6). Harvard University Herbaria: 194–212. doi:10.5962/p.168542. ISSN 0006-8098. JSTOR 41762231.
- Hofmann A, Heim R, Tscherter H (1963). "Phytochimie – présence de la psilocybine dans une espèce européenne d'agaric, le Psilocybe semilanceata Fr" [Phytochemistry – presence of psilocybin in a European agaric species, Psilocybe semilanceata]. Comptes Rendus Hebdomadaires des Séances de l'Académie des Sciences (in French). 257 (1): 10–12.
- Hofmann A (August 1963). "Psychotomimetic Substances". The Indian Journal of Pharmacy. 25 (8): 245–256. Archived from the original on 7 April 2025.
- Hofmann A (August 1963). "Die Neuesten Ergebnisse auf dem Gebiet der Mutterkornalkaloide" [The Latest Findings in the Field of Ergot Alkaloids]. Dan Tidsskr Farm (in German). 37: 181–200. PMID 14049456.
- Ott H, Frey AJ, Hofmann A (November 1963). "The stereospecific cyclolization of n-(α-hydroxyacyl)-phenylalanyl-proline lactams". Tetrahedron. 19 (11): 1675–1684. doi:10.1016/s0040-4020(01)99240-3. PMID 5879254.
- Stadler, P. A.; Frey, A. J.; Hofmann, A. (1963). "Herstellung der optisch aktiven Methyl-benzyloxy-malonsäurehalbester und Bestimmung ihrer absoluten Konfiguration. 57. Mitteilung über Mutterkornalkaloide". Helvetica Chimica Acta. 46 (6): 2300–2305. doi:10.1002/hlca.19630460649. ISSN 0018-019X.
- Hofmann, A.; Ott, H.; Griot, R.; Stadler, P. A.; Frey, A. J. (1963). "Die Synthese und Stereochemie des Ergotamins. (58. Mitteilung über Mutterkornalkaloide". Helvetica Chimica Acta. 46 (6): 2306–2328. Bibcode:1963HChAc..46.2306H. doi:10.1002/hlca.19630460650. ISSN 0018-019X.
- Schlientz, W.; Brunner, R.; Hofmann, A. (1963). "d-Lysergyl-l-valin-methylester, ein neues, natürliches Mutterkornalkaloid". Experientia (in German). 19 (8): 397–398. doi:10.1007/BF02171505. ISSN 0014-4754. PMID 14084049.
- Hofmann A (1964). "The Active Principles of the Seeds of Rivea Corymbosa and Ipomoea Violacea" (PDF). Psychedelic Review. 1 (3): 302–316. ISSN 0033-2631.
- Stadler, P. A.; Frey, A. J.; Troxler, F.; Hofmann, A. (1964). "Selektive Reduktions- und Oxydationsreaktionen an lysergsäure- Derivaten. 2.3-Dihydro- und 12-Hydroxy-lysergsäureamide. 59. Mitteilung über Mutterkornalkaloide" [Selective Reduction and Oxidation Reactions on Lysergic Acid Derivatives. 2,3-Dihydro- and 12-Hydroxylysergic Acid Amides. 59. Communication on Ergot Alkaloids]. Helvetica Chimica Acta. 47 (3): 756–769. doi:10.1002/hlca.19640470309. ISSN 0018-019X. Archived from the original on 11 July 2025.
- Hofmann, A. (1964). "Mexikanische Zauberdrogen und ihre Wirkstoffe" [The Mexican Magic-Drug and Its Active Ingredients]. Planta Medica. 12 (3): 341–352. Bibcode:1964PlMed..12..341H. doi:10.1055/s-0028-1100188. ISSN 0032-0943. Archived from the original on 11 July 2025.
- Schlientz, W.; Brunner, R.; Stadler, P. A.; Frey, A. J.; Ott, H.; Hofmann, A. (1964). "Isolierung und Synthese des Ergostins, eines neuen Mutterkorn-Alkaloids. 62. Mitteilung über Mutterkornalkaloide". Helvetica Chimica Acta. 47 (7): 1921–1933. Bibcode:1964HChAc..47.1921S. doi:10.1002/hlca.19640470732. ISSN 0018-019X.
- Stauffacher D, Tscherter H, Hofmann A (September 1965). "Isolierung von Ergosin und Ergosinin neben Agroclavin aus den Samen von Ipomoea argyrophylla V ATKE ( Convolvulaceae ). 64. Mitteilung über Mutterkornalkaloide" [Isolation of ergosine and ergosinine as well as agroclavine from seeds of Ipomoea argyrophylla Vatke (Convolvulaceae). 64. On ergot alkaloids (1)]. Helv Chim Acta (in German). 48 (6): 1379–1380. Bibcode:1965HChAc..48.1379S. doi:10.1002/hlca.19650480618. PMID 5846759.
- Hofmann A (October 1965). "Gehaltsbestimmung und Pharmakologie des Mutterkorns und seiner Zubereitungen" [Content determination and pharmacology of ergot and its preparations]. Pharm Weekbl (in German). 100 (44): 1261–1283. PMID 5847686.
- Heim R, Hofmann A, Scherter H (January 1966). "Sur une intoxication collective à syndrome psilocybien causée en France par un Copelandia" [On a Collective Psilocybin Syndrome Intoxication in France Caused by a Copelandia]. Comptes Rendus de l'Académie des Sciences, Série D (in French). 262 (4): 519–523. PMID 4955812. Archived from the original on 11 July 2025.
- Ott H, Hofmann A, Frey AJ (March 1966). "Acid-catalyzed isomerization in the peptide part of ergot alkaloids". J Am Chem Soc. 88 (6): 1251–1256. Bibcode:1966JAChS..88.1251O. doi:10.1021/ja00958a031. PMID 5905605.
- Hofmann A (1967). "Psycho-aktiv Stoffe aus Pflanzen". Ther. Woche. 17: 1739–1746.
- Schlientz W, Brunner R, Rüegger A, Berde B, Stürmer E, Hofmann A (December 1967). "β-Ergokryptine, a new alkaloid of the ergotoxine group". Experientia. 23 (12): 991–992. doi:10.1007/BF02136400. PMID 4965668.
- Schlientz W, Brunner R, Rüegger A, Berde B, Stürmer E, Hofmann A (August 1968). "β-Ergokryptin, ein neues Alkaloid der Ergotoxin-Gruppe. 67. Mitteilung über Mutterkornalkaloide" [β-ergokryptin, a new alkaloid of ergotoxin-group. 67. Report on ergot alkaloids]. Pharm Acta Helv (in German). 43 (8): 497–509. PMID 5719463.
- Hofmann A (1968). "Recherches sur des Alcaloïdes Peptidiques d'Ergot Semisythétiques" [Research on Semisynthetic Ergot Peptide Alkaloids]. Chimie Thérapeutique. 3: 367–375. Archived from the original on 11 July 2025.
- Stadler PA, Guttmann S, Hauth H, Huguenin RL, Sandrin E, Wersin G, Willems H, Hofmann A (1969). "Die Synthese der Alkaloide der Ergotoxin-Gruppe. 70. Mitteilung über Mutterkornalkaloide" [The Synthesis of Alkaloids in the Ergotoxin Group. 70. Communication on Ergot Alkaloids]. Helv Chim Acta (in German). 52 (6): 1549–1564. doi:10.1002/hlca.19690520616. PMID 5820778. Archived from the original on 11 July 2025.
- Hofmann A (1969). "Investigaciones Sobre los Hongos Alucinogenos Mexicanos y la Importancia que Tienen en la Medicina sus Substancias Activas". Artes de México. 16 (124): 23–28. JSTOR 24315975.
- Hofmann A (1969). "Research of the Mexican Hallucinogenic Mushrooms and the Importance of their Active Substances in the Medical Science". Artes de México. 16 (124): 29–31. JSTOR 24317512.
- Hofmann A (1969). "Investigation sur les Champignons Hallucinogenes du Mexique et L'Importance de Leurs Substances Actives Pour la Medecine". Artes de México. 16 (124): 100–101. JSTOR 24315982.
- Hofmann A (1969). "Die Erforschung der Mexikanischen Zauberpilze und die Medizinische Bedeutung Ihrer Wirkstoffe". Artes de México. 16 (124): 109–110. JSTOR 24315990.
- Stauffacher D, Niklaus P, Tscherter H, Weber HP, Hofmann A (December 1969). "Cycloclavin, ein neues Alkaloid aus Ipomoea Hildebrandtii Vatke. 71. Mutterkornalkaloide" [Cycloclavin, a new alkaloid from Ipomoea hildebrandtii Vatke. 71. Ergot alkaloids]. Tetrahedron (in German). 25 (24): 5879–5887. doi:10.1016/s0040-4020(01)83095-7. PMID 5373534.

=== 1970s ===
- Hofmann A (1970). "Les hallucinogènes" [The Hallucinogens]. La Recherche. 1 (3): 239–258. Archived from the original on 11 July 2025.
- Hofmann A (1970). "Struktur und Synthese der Halluzinogene" [Structure and Synthesis of Hallucinogens]. Journal Mondiale de Pharmacie. 13: 187–205. Archived from the original on 11 July 2025.
- Stütz P, Stadler PA, Hofmann A (1970). "Synthesis of ergonine and ergoptine, two new analogs of the ergot alkaloids of the ergoxine group" [Synthese von Ergonin und Ergoptin, zweier Mutterkornalkaloid-Analoga der Ergoxin-Gruppe 72. Mitteilung über Mutterkornalkaloide]. Helv Chim Acta (in German). 53 (6): 1278–1285. doi:10.1002/hlca.19700530604. PMID 5471412.
- Fehr T, Stadler PA, Hofmann A (1970). "Demethylierung des Lysergsäuregerüstes. 73. Mitteilung über Mutterkornalkaloide" [Demethylation of lysergic acid skeleton]. Helv Chim Acta (in German). 53 (8): 2197–2201. Bibcode:1970HChAc..53.2197F. doi:10.1002/hlca.19700530832. PMID 5498833.
- Hofmann A (March 1970). "Notes and documents concerning the discovery of LSD". Agents and Actions. 1 (3): 148–150. doi:10.1007/BF01982402. PMID 4938414.
- Hofmann A (1971). "Teonanácatl and Ololiuqui, Two Ancient Magic Drugs of Mexico". Bulletin on Narcotics. 23 (1): 3–14. Archived from the original on 11 July 2025.
- Hofmann, A. (1972). "Ein neuer Süßstoff aus der Indolreihe". Helvetica Chimica Acta. 55 (8): 2934–2940. Bibcode:1972HChAc..55.2934H. doi:10.1002/hlca.19720550824. ISSN 0018-019X.
- Hofmann A (January 1975). "Discovery of LSD and Subsequent Investigations of Related Magic Drugs of Mexico". Lloydia - the Journal of Natural Products. 38 (6): 532. Archived from the original on 11 July 2025.
- Hofmann A (1975). "Die Entdeckung des LSD und nachfolgende Untersuchungen über verwandie mexikanische Zauberdrogen" [The Discovery of LSD and Subsequent Studies on Administering the Mexican Magic-Drug]. Dtsch. Apoth. ZTG. 115 (54, 21.8): 1264–1265. Archived from the original on 11 July 2025.
- Hofmann A (1978). "Historical view on ergot alkaloids". Pharmacology. 16 Suppl 1: 1–11. doi:10.1159/000136803. PMID 347462. Archived from the original on 11 July 2025.
- Hofmann A (1979). "How LSD originated". J Psychedelic Drugs. 11 (1–2): 53–60. doi:10.1080/02791072.1979.10472092. PMID 392118. Archived from the original on 11 July 2025.
- Hofmann A (1979). "Planung und Zufall in der pharmazeutischchemisschen Forschung". Sandoz Bulletin. 50: 4–17.

=== 1980s ===
- Hofmann A (1981). "LSD — Seine Erfindung und Stellung innerhalb der Psychodrogen in Rausch und Realitat. Drogen im Kulturvergleich. Extase et réalité. Les drogues dans une perspective transculturelle" [LSD - My Invention and Its Place Within the Psychoactive Drugs]. Ethnologica. 9 (2): 642–647. Archived from the original on 11 July 2025.
- Hofmann A (1982). "Ololiuqui: A Sacred Drug of the Aztecs". Pharmacy International. 3: 216–217.
- Hofmann A (1987). "Pilzliche Halluzinogene vom Mutterkorn bis zu den mexikanischen Zauberpilzen" [Fungal hallucinogens from ergot to the 'Mexican magic fungi']. Champignon (Germany, FR). 27 (310): 22–28. ISSN 0009-1308.

=== 1990s ===
- Hofmann A (1992). "Chemistry and Pharmacology of the "Sacred Mushrooms" of Mexico". Annali dei Musei Civici di Rovereto. 8 (suppl): 97–106. Archived from the original on 11 July 2025.
- Hofmann, A. (1994). "Notes and documents concerning the discovery of LSD". Agents and Actions. 43 (3–4): 79–81. doi:10.1007/BF01986673. ISSN 0065-4299. PMID 7725979. Archived from the original on 11 July 2025.
- Hoffman, Albert; J. Ott (1996). "LSD: Completely Personal". Newsletter of the Multidisciplinary Association for Psychedelic Studies. 6 (3). Archived from the original on 6 December 2013.
- Hofmann, Albert (1999). "Planned Research and Chance Discovery in Pharmaceutical Development". Clinical Research and Regulatory Affairs. 16 (4): 139–155. doi:10.3109/10601339909005306. ISSN 1060-1333.

== Interviews ==
- Michael Horowitz (July 1976). "Interview: Albert Hofmann". High Times. No. 11. pp. 24–28, 31, 81. Archived from the original on 2025-05-05.
- Hofmann A (1981). "LSD ist eine sakrale Droge (Interview mit Dr. Hofmann)". Psychologie Heute. 4: 55–61.
- Don Rothenberg (video maker), Will Nofke (interviewer), Albert Hofmann (interviewee) (1983). An Evening with Albert Hofmann. Berkeley, California: Erowid.
- Grof S, Hofmann A (Fall 2001) [1984]. "Stanislav Grof interviews Dr. Albert Hofmann Esalen Institute, Big Sur, California, 1984". MAPS Bulletin. 11 (2): 22–35.
- Siegfried W, Hofmann A (1988). "Interview with Hofmann, Albert, the Discoverer of LSD". Du-Die Zeitschrift der Kultur (2): 74–79.
- Lucius Werthmüller (1995). "Interview mit Dr. Albert Hofmann". Basler Psi Verein (BPV) (in German). Archived from the original on 15 October 2012.
- Charles S. Grob (25 April 2013) [November 1996]. "A Conversation with Albert Hofmann, November 1996, Interviewed by Charles S. Grob, M.D., v1.1". Erowid.
- Hofmann A (25 May 2001). Address to Mind States Conference II, Berkeley, California, May 2001. Mind States Conference II, Berkeley, California, May 2001. Read by Myron Stolaroff. Berkeley, California.
- Charles S. Grob (2002). "A Conversation with Albert Hofmann". In Charles S. Grob (ed.). Hallucinogens: A Reader. New York: Penguin Putnam. pp. 15–22. ISBN 978-1-58542-166-4.

== Selected related publications ==
- Stoll WA (1947). "11. Lysergsäure-diäthylamid, ein Phantastikum aus der Mutterkorngruppe" [11. Lysergic Acid Diethylamide, a Hallucinogen From the Ergot Group]. Schweizer Archiv für Neurologie und Psychiatrie. 60: 279–323. ISSN 0258-7661. Archived from the original on April 1, 2025.
- Stoll W (1949). "Ein neues, in sehr kleinen Mengen wirksames Phantastikum" [A New Phantasticum, Effective in Very Tiny Amounts]. Schweizer Archiv für Neurologie und Psychiatrie. 64: 483–484. ISSN 0258-7661. Archived from the original on April 1, 2025.
- Rothlin E, Cerletti A (1956). "Pharmacology of LSD-25". In Cholden L (ed.). Proceedings of the Round Table on Lysergic Acid Diethylamide and Mescaline in Experimental Psychiatry: Held at the Annual Meeting of the American Psychiatric Association, Atlantic City, New Jersey, May 12, 1955 (PDF). New York/London: Grune & Stratton. pp. 1–7. LCCN 56-8731. OCLC 920839. OL 14111211M. Archived from the original on 12 July 2025.
- Cerletti A (1956). "Lysergic Acid Diethylamide (LSD) and Related Compounds". In Abramson HA (ed.). Neuropharmacology: Transactions of the 2nd Conference, May 25-27, 1955, Princeton, N.J. New York: Josiah Macy. pp. 9–84. Archived from the original on 12 July 2025.
- Rothlin E (March 1957). "Lysergic acid diethylamide and related substances". Ann N Y Acad Sci. 66 (3): 668–676. Bibcode:1957NYASA..66..668R. doi:10.1111/j.1749-6632.1957.tb40756.x. PMID 13425249. Archived from the original on 12 July 2025.
- Rothlin, E (1 September 1957). "Pharmacology of Lysergic Acid Diethylamide and Some of Its Related Compounds". Journal of Pharmacy and Pharmacology. 9 (1): 569–587. doi:10.1111/j.2042-7158.1957.tb12312.x. eISSN 2042-7158. ISSN 0022-3573. PMID 13463749. Archived from the original on 12 July 2025.
- Rothlin E (1957). "Pharmacology of Lysergic Acid Diethylamide (LSD) and Some of Its Related Compounds". In Garattini S, Ghetti V (eds.). Psychotropic Drugs: Proceedings of the International Symposium on Psychotropic Drugs, Milan, May 9-11, 1957. Amsterdam/New York: Elsevier. pp. 36–47. OCLC 14610043. OL 6226866M. Archived from the original on 12 July 2025.
- Cerletti A, Doepfner W (January 1958). "Comparative study on the serotonin antagonism of amide derivatives of lysergic acid and of ergot alkaloids". The Journal of Pharmacology and Experimental Therapeutics. 122 (1): 124–136. doi:10.1016/S0022-3565(25)11933-2. PMID 13502837. Archived from the original on 25 March 2025.
- Cerletti A (1959). "Comparison of Abnormal Behavioral States Induced by Psychotropic Drugs in Animals and Man". In Bradley PB, Deniker P, Radouco-Thomas C (eds.). Proceedings of the 1st International Congress of Neuro-Psychopharmacology, Rome, September 1958. Amsterdam: Elsevier. pp. 117–123. Archived from the original on 30 March 2025.
- Cerletti, A. (December 1959). "Teonanacatl und Psilocybin" [Teonanacatl and psilocybin]. Deutsche Medizinische Wochenschrift (in German). 84 (52): 2317–2321. doi:10.1055/s-0028-1114618. eISSN 1439-4413. ISSN 0012-0472. PMID 13808846.
- Rutschmann J, Stadler PA (1978). "Chemical Background". In Berde B, Schild HO (eds.). Ergot Alkaloids and Related Compounds. Handbook of Experimental Pharmacology (HEP). Vol. 49. Berlin, Heidelberg: Springer Berlin Heidelberg. pp. 29–85. doi:10.1007/978-3-642-66775-6_2. ISBN 978-3-642-66777-0.
- Fanchamps A (1978). "Some Compounds With Hallucinogenic Activity". In Berde B, Schild HO (eds.). Ergot Alkaloids and Related Compounds. Handbook of Experimental Pharmacology (HEP). Vol. 49. Berlin, Heidelberg: Springer Berlin Heidelberg. pp. 567–614. doi:10.1007/978-3-642-66775-6_8. ISBN 978-3-642-66777-0. Archived from the original on 30 March 2025.

== See also ==
- Albert Hofmann
- Bibliography of Alexander Shulgin
- Bibliography of Hamilton Morris
