= Mattha Busby =

British journalist

- Pronunciation: /ˈmeɪθə/ MAY-thə
- Born: November 30, 1993 (age 32); Bletchley, Great Britain
- Education: Royal Holloway (BA); Goldsmiths College, University of London (MA)
- Occupation: Freelance journalist
- Years active: 2014–present
- Known for: Journalism and books on psychoactive drugs, drug policy, culture, and society
- Notable work: Should All Drugs Be Legalized?: A Primer for the 21st Century (2022); Psychedelics: A Pocket Primer (2025)
- Website: matthabusby.net matthabusby.substack.com

Mattha Busby is a British freelance journalist who covers psychoactive drugs, drug policy, culture, and society, with a particular focus on psychedelic drugs.

He has written for news outlets including The Guardian, TIME, The Times of London, The Observer, The Intercept, The Daily Beast, Vice, Wired, New Scientist, Rolling Stone, LA Times, Esquire, GQ, Men's Health, DoubleBlind, and Lucid News, among others. Busby is also the author of two short books, which include Should All Drugs Be Legalized?: A Primer for the 21st Century (2022) and Psychedelics: A Pocket Primer (2025). He has a master's degree in journalism from Goldsmiths College, University of London.

Busby won the London Press Club "Hugh Cudlipp" Award in 2018 and was a Ferriss–UC Berkeley Psychedelic Journalism fellow in 2024. He has been interviewed a number of times, for instance by Psychedelics Today and Dennis McKenna on Brainforest Café, among others.

In 2023, Busby broke an exclusive story for The Guardian that the Advisory Council on the Misuse of Drugs (ACMD), the United Kingdom government's official drug advisers, had privately recommended decriminalization of drugs in a 27-page report in 2016, but that the Home Office had ignored the recommendations and fought for years to keep the report confidential.

Busby personally uses psychedelics and considers himself to be an advocate for them, but also takes a balanced and critical perspective on psychedelics and on their potential benefits and harms.

== Selected publications ==
- Should All Drugs Be Legalized?: A Primer for the 21st Century. National Geographic Books. 12 July 2022. ISBN 978-0-500-29568-7.
- Psychedelics: A Pocket Primer. Hoxton Mini Press. 17 June 2025. ISBN 978-1-914314-86-5.

== See also ==
- Hamilton Morris
- Michael Pollan
- Rachel Nuwer
