= Jason Wallach =

American pharmacologist

- Born: 1987 (age 38–39)
- Education: Indiana University of Pennsylvania; University of the Sciences
- Occupations: Pharmacologist; Assistant professor
- Years active: 2009–present
- Employer(s): Saint Joseph's University; Philadelphia College of Pharmacy
- Website: https://directory.sju.edu/jason-wallach https://www.wallachlab.com/

Jason Wallach (born 1987) is an American pharmacologist who studies psychedelic drugs and other hallucinogens. He is an assistant professor at Saint Joseph's University's Philadelphia College of Pharmacy.

In August 2020, Wallach began a partnership with the pharmaceutical company Compass Pathways for his research lab to develop novel psychedelic drugs as therapeutics. Hamilton Morris, a psychedelic journalist and the host of Hamilton's Pharmacopeia, works as a chemist in Wallach's lab.

Wallach graduated from Indiana University of Pennsylvania with his bachelor's degree in cell and molecular biology in 2008 and graduated with his Doctor of Philosophy degree in pharmacology and toxicology from the University of the Sciences in 2014.

In 2023, Wallach, Morris, and other colleagues published a key paper characterizing the serotonin 5-HT_{2A} receptor intracellular signaling cascades mediating the head-twitch response, a behavioral proxy of psychedelic effects, in rodents. Wallach and Morris have intensively studied the auditory psychedelic diisopropyltryptamine (DiPT) for more than a decade.

== See also ==
- List of psychedelic chemists
