= Compass Pathways =

British psychedelic medicine company

- Industry: Pharmaceutical; Psychedelic medicine
- Founded: June 13, 2016; 10 years ago in London, United Kingdom
- Founder: George Goldsmith; Ekaterina Malievskaia
- Headquarters: London, United Kingdom
- Key people: Kabir Nath (CEO)
- Website: compasspathways.com

Compass Pathways, or COMPASS Pathways, is a British pharmaceutical company developing psychedelics as potential medicines. Its main drug candidate, psilocybin (COMP360), has completed phase 3 clinical trials for treatment-resistant depression. The results showed clear benefit to participants as measured on the MADRS depression rating scale. This candidate has received breakthrough therapy status from the U.S. Food and Drug Administration (FDA). It is the most advanced psychedelic drug candidate in development besides Lykos Therapeutics's midomafetamine (MDMA).

Compass Pathways is the largest company in the psychedelic medicine industry and, in 2020, was the first psychedelic medicine company to be listed on the NASDAQ. It has faced criticism for patenting psychedelic drugs and even certain psilocybin mushroom species. In October 2024, after the FDA rejected Lykos Therapeutics's MDMA for post-traumatic stress disorder (PTSD) New Drug Application (NDA), Compass Pathways said that it would lay off 30% of its workforce and narrow its research focus.

Compass Pathways has entered partnerships with several independent psychedelic academic scientists, including Jason Wallach, Hamilton Morris, and Adam Halberstadt among others, to develop novel psychedelic drugs for potential medical use. Wallach's lab is said to have sought patents for over 200 novel compounds as of May 2024.

Compass Pathways switched from being a nonprofit organization to a for-profit company in 2016. The pharmaceutical company has been backed and funded by a number of tech entrepreneurs such as Peter Thiel. The media outlet Sifted remarks that the biotech billionaire Christian Angermayer was instrumental in the founding of Compass Pathways."

== See also ==
- List of psychedelic pharmaceutical companies
- List of investigational hallucinogens and entactogens
