= Adam Halberstadt =

American neuroscientist and pharmacologist

- Education: University of Delaware; University of Pittsburgh
- Occupations: Neuroscientist; Pharmacologist; Professor
- Employer: University of California, San Diego
- Website: https://profiles.ucsd.edu/adam.halberstadt

Adam L. Halberstadt is an American neuroscientist and pharmacologist who studies psychedelic drugs from a cross-species translational perspective. He is a Professor at the University of California, San Diego (UCSD) and the Director of the UCSD Center for Psychedelic Research. One of his most notable contributions has been the development of an automated assay for the head-twitch response, a behavioral proxy of psychedelic effects in animals. He has used the head-twitch response assay to investigate the 5-HT2A receptor signaling mechanisms involved in the effects of psychedelic drugs. He is one of the Principal Investigators on a clinical trial being conducted at UCSD to test whether psilocybin can relieve phantom limb pain in amputees. In February 2021, he formed a collaboration with COMPASS Pathways to develop novel psychedelic drugs as therapeutics. In 2022, has was listed as an inventor on an application for a US Patent covering novel 5-HT2A ligands acting as partial or biased agonists. He has also collaborated with BetterLife Pharma Inc. on a project designed to investigate the pharmacology of the non-psychedelic LSD derivative BOL-148, also known as 2-bromo-LSD. Halberstadt received his bachelor's degree in neuroscience from the University of Delaware in 1998 and his Doctor of Philosophy in neurobiology from the University of Pittsburgh in 2006.

== Selected publications ==
- Halberstadt, Adam L.; Nichols, David E. (2010). "Serotonin and Serotonin Receptors in Hallucinogen Action". Handbook of Behavioral Neuroscience. Vol. 21. Elsevier. pp. 621–636. doi:10.1016/s1569-7339(10)70103-x. ISBN 978-0-12-374634-4.
- Grob CS, Danforth AL, Chopra GS, Hagerty M, McKay CR, Halberstadt AL, Greer GR (January 2011). "Pilot study of psilocybin treatment for anxiety in patients with advanced-stage cancer". Arch Gen Psychiatry. 68 (1): 71–78. doi:10.1001/archgenpsychiatry.2010.116. PMID 20819978.
- Halberstadt AL, Geyer MA (September 2011). "Multiple receptors contribute to the behavioral effects of indoleamine hallucinogens". Neuropharmacology. 61 (3): 364–381. doi:10.1016/j.neuropharm.2011.01.017. PMC 3110631. PMID 21256140.
- Halberstadt AL, Koedood L, Powell SB, Geyer MA (November 2011). "Differential contributions of serotonin receptors to the behavioral effects of indoleamine hallucinogens in mice". J Psychopharmacol. 25 (11): 1548–1561. doi:10.1177/0269881110388326. PMC 3531560. PMID 21148021.
- Halberstadt AL, Geyer MA (June 2013). "Characterization of the head-twitch response induced by hallucinogens in mice: detection of the behavior based on the dynamics of head movement". Psychopharmacology (Berl). 227 (4): 727–739. doi:10.1007/s00213-013-3006-z. PMC 3866102. PMID 23407781.
- Halberstadt AL (January 2015). "Recent advances in the neuropsychopharmacology of serotonergic hallucinogens". Behav Brain Res. 277: 99–120. doi:10.1016/j.bbr.2014.07.016. PMC 4642895. PMID 25036425.
- Halberstadt, Adam L.; Geyer, Mark A. (2016). "Effect of Hallucinogens on Unconditioned Behavior". Behavioral Neurobiology of Psychedelic Drugs. Current Topics in Behavioral Neurosciences. Vol. 36. Berlin, Heidelberg: Springer Berlin Heidelberg. pp. 159–199. doi:10.1007/7854_2016_466. ISBN 978-3-662-55878-2. PMC 5787039. PMID 28224459.
- Halberstadt AL (2017). "Pharmacology and Toxicology of N-Benzylphenethylamine ("NBOMe") Hallucinogens". Neuropharmacology of New Psychoactive Substances (NPS). Current Topics in Behavioral Neurosciences. Vol. 32. pp. 283–311. doi:10.1007/7854_2016_64. ISBN 978-3-319-52442-9. PMID 28097528.
- Halberstadt AL, Chatha M, Klein AK, Wallach J, Brandt SD (May 2020). "Correlation between the potency of hallucinogens in the mouse head-twitch response assay and their behavioral and subjective effects in other species". Neuropharmacology. 167 107933. doi:10.1016/j.neuropharm.2019.107933. PMC 9191653. PMID 31917152.
- Poulie CB, Jensen AA, Halberstadt AL, Kristensen JL (December 2020). "DARK Classics in Chemical Neuroscience: NBOMes". ACS Chem Neurosci. 11 (23): 3860–3869. doi:10.1021/acschemneuro.9b00528. PMC 9191638. PMID 31657895.
- Wallach J, Cao AB, Calkins MM, Heim AJ, Lanham JK, Bonniwell EM, Hennessey JJ, Bock HA, Anderson EI, Sherwood AM, Morris H, de Klein R, Klein AK, Cuccurazzu B, Gamrat J, Fannana T, Zauhar R, Halberstadt AL, McCorvy JD (December 2023). "Identification of 5-HT2A receptor signaling pathways associated with psychedelic potential". Nat Commun. 14 (1): 8221. doi:10.1038/s41467-023-44016-1. PMC 10724237. PMID 38102107.
