= Hamilton's Pharmacopeia =

American documentary television series

- Genre: Docuseries
- Created by: Hamilton Morris
- Directed by: Hamilton Morris
- Country of origin: United States
- No. of seasons: 3
- No. of episodes: 20

Production
- Executive producer: Hamilton Morris
- Running time: 45 minutes
- Production company: Vice Media

Original release
- Network: Viceland
- Release: October 26, 2016 – February 8, 2021

Hamilton's Pharmacopeia is an American docuseries, which premiered on Viceland on October 26, 2016. The show follows Hamilton Morris as he explores the history, chemistry and social impact of psychoactive substances. It chronicles Morris' travels and first-hand experiences, as well as interviews with scientists, shamans and fringe culture figures.

== Background ==
Hamilton's Pharmacopeia is a documentary series created, written, and directed by Hamilton Morris. It has been produced in various forms since 2009. Hamilton's Pharmacopeia began as a monthly column about psychoactive drugs written by Morris for Vice magazine. When given the opportunity to film short documentaries to accompany his written pieces, Morris began to produce Hamilton's Pharmacopeia as an online documentary series starting with the release of The Sapo Diaries that same year. Initially the series was only available on VBS.TV, but after its release on YouTube the series began to gain a wider international following. From 2009 to 2017, Morris produced ten Pharmacopeia documentaries before the show began its first season on the cable television channel Viceland (now Vice TV). From 2016 to 2020, Morris directed twenty episodes of Hamilton's Pharmacopeia for Viceland. After delays caused by the COVID-19 pandemic, the third season was released on January 4, 2021.

== Episodes ==
=== Series overview ===
Season	Episodes	Originally released	
Season	Episodes	First released	Last released
1	6	October 26, 2016	December 7, 2016
2	8	November 28, 2017	January 16, 2018
3	6	January 4, 2021	February 8, 2021

=== Season 1 (2016) ===
No. overall	No. in season	Title	Original release date
1	1	"The Story of the South African Quaalude — South Africa is the last place on earth Quaaludes can still be found. Hamilton travels there to study the drug and finds a dark history of medical experimentation."	October 26, 2016
2	2	"A Positive PCP Story — Hamilton travels across the USA meeting with addicts, dealers, chemists, and celebrities to trace the history of PCP from its pharmaceutical origins to its escape onto the streets."	November 2, 2016
3	3	"Shepherdess: The Story of Salvia Divinorum — From the heavenly cloud forests of Oaxaca to a viral video of Miley Cyrus, Hamilton investigates the inconspicuous yet extraordinary psychedelic plant Salvia divinorum."	November 9, 2016
4	4	"Magic Mushrooms in Mexico - Hamilton examines the historical and ethnobotanical uses of Psilocybe species. He travels to Oaxaca, Jalisco and Florida. On this journey he attends a traditional ceremony hosted by Maria Sabina’s son."	November 16, 2016
5	5	"Fish N' Trips — Hamilton embarks on an aquatic adventure to Reunion Island and Madagascar to investigate ichthyoallyeinotoxism and a twisted history of hallucinogenic fish."	November 30, 2016
6	6	"The Lazy Lizard School of Hedonism — Hamilton meets with famed LSD chemist Casey Hardison in the Nevada desert and embark on a road trip to visit an unsung hero of psychedelic history - Darrell Lemaire."	December 7, 2016

=== Season 2 (2017–18) ===
No. overall	No. in season	Title	Original release date
7	1	"The Psychedelic Toad — Hamilton embarks on a quest to answer the most important question in ethnoherpetological history and along the way, he finds the power of love."	November 28, 2017
8	2	"Peyote: The Divine Messenger — From the greenhouses of Thai cactophiles to the Tamaulipan thornscrub, Hamilton traces the history of peyote with the help of a Native American peyotist."	December 5, 2017
9	3	"Kratom: The Forbidden Leaf — Hamilton investigates the pharmacology and traditional uses of Kratom, a Thai tree with opioid-containing leaves."	December 12, 2017
10	4	"Wizards of DMT — Hamilton travels across North America to study how and why DMT exists in the environment and the laboratory."	December 19, 2017
11	5	"Ketamine: Realms and Realities — Hamilton heads to India to see industrial Ketamine synthesis, and speak with therapists and luminaries in an attempt to understand the role of dissociative anesthetics in society."	December 26, 2017
12	6	"A Clandestine Chemist's Tale — Hamilton meets an unsung hero of the psychedelic underground and hears a tragic tale of MDMA synthesis and chemiluminescence."	January 2, 2018
13	7	"A Fungal Fairy Tale — Hamilton ascends the Carpathian Mountains, microscope in hand, to learn how Europeans use Amanita muscaria, and uncovers the chemistry behind a mushroom-inspired pharmaceutical."	January 9, 2018
14	8	"The Cactus Apprentice — Deep in the Andean highlands of Peru, Hamilton becomes the apprentice of a local shaman, learning how to use the night-blooming San Pedro cactus as a medicine."	January 16, 2018

=== Season 3 (2021) ===
No. overall	No. in season	Title	Original release date
15	1	"Synthetic Toad Venom Machine — Haunted by past mistakes, Hamilton embarks on a journey to correct an error in his reporting and identifies the origin of an international toad venom smoking phenomenon."	January 4, 2021
16	2	"A Positive Methamphetamine Story — Hamilton explores the simultaneous chemically seductive and insidiously dangerous world of crystal methamphetamine. A drug that has by rule of economics become one of the world's most popular ones."	January 11, 2021
17	3	"Xenon: the Perfect Anesthetic? - Hamilton traces the multi-billion-year history of nitrous oxide on Earth and follows the strangest noble gas to the Czech Republic.""	January 18, 2021
18	4	"Synthetic Ibogaine: Natural Tramadol — Hamilton travels to meet with several research scientists to understand how or why tramadol, believed to be a purely synthetic lab created substance, was found in harvested African ibogaine root. He then travels to Africa to learn how this plant is being used as a treatment for tramadol addiction and a variety of other physical and mental ailments."	January 25, 2021
19	5	"Bufotenine: In Search of Hataj - Hamilton responds to viewer demands for a review on bufotenine. He travels to Northern Argentina to observe Anadenanthera in its native environment and examine the ancient ethnobotanical uses."	February 1, 2021
20	6	"Ultra LSD — With the precise structure of LSD's molecular target identified, Hamilton discusses a new era of psychedelic research and, along the way, meets pioneers of the field."	February 8, 2021

== Reception ==
The show has received widespread critical acclaim for its alternative and unusually honest approach to the portrayal of recreational drug use. Writing for The Guardian, Tim Jonze drew comparisons between Morris' obsessive dedication to his subject and similar qualities in his father. Praising his demeanor on the show, Jonze writes: "Morris is a good presence on screen – dressed all in white, he has a sort of charming awkwardness not dissimilar to Louis Theroux (they share the same disarming smile) and he allows his subjects plenty of space to tell their stories." In another review for The New York Times, Ross Simonini praised the show's unique tone: "Mr. Morris has a grinning, laid-back persona, with an approach not dissimilar to Hunter S. Thompson’s gonzo journalism. In person Mr. Morris, son of the filmmaker Errol Morris, is bookish and intense, speaking with a fastidious attention to word choice." Hermione Hoby made similar remarks, writing that Hamilton Morris proceeds with "a mix of gonzo abandon and scholarly rigour".

== See also ==
- Hamilton Morris
- Bibliography of Hamilton Morris
- List of psychedelic documentaries
- List of programs broadcast by Viceland
- Hamilton's Pharmacopeia (web series)
