= Hamilton Morris =

American journalist (born 1987)

- Morris in 2019
- Born: April 14, 1987 (age 39); New York City, New York, United States
- Other name: D. H. Ticklish
- Education: The University of Chicago; The New School (BSc)
- Occupations: Journalist; Filmmaker; Chemist; Scientist
- Years active: 2008–present
- Employer(s): Vice Media; University of the Sciences's Philadelphia College of Pharmacy; Compass Pathways
- Known for: Psychoactive drug journalism and research
- Notable work: Hamilton's Pharmacopeia (TV show) (alt); Hamilton's Pharmacopeia (web series); The Hamilton Morris Podcast
- Parents: Errol Morris (father); Julia Sheehan (mother)
- Website: hamiltonmorris.com patreon.com/HamiltonMorris

Hamilton Morris (born April 14, 1987) is an American journalist, filmmaker, chemist, and scientific researcher. He is most well-known for his television series Hamilton's Pharmacopeia, which aired from 2016 to 2021 and covered the chemistry, history, and cultural impact of various psychoactive drugs, particularly psychedelics. Morris also started a podcast called The Hamilton Morris Podcast in 2020. He is considered to be among the leading psychoactive drug journalists.

== Early life and education ==
Morris was born in New York City, the son of Julia Sheehan, an art historian, and documentary filmmaker Errol Morris. He is Jewish. Morris was raised in Cambridge, Massachusetts. He has described being a pyromaniac and interested in explosives and poisons as a child. In his teenage years, he appeared in television commercials, notably a 2002 advertisement for the first-generation iPod.

Morris first explored psychoactive drugs by trying Salvia divinorum with a friend in high school as a teenager, which left him in a state of "astonishment" and led him to learn how to chemically extract salvinorin A from the plant. However, it was not until Morris learned about Alexander Shulgin and novel research chemicals via a New York Times article a few years later in 2005 that he became more interested in and "obsessed" with psychoactive drugs. Relatedly, Morris discovered and began frequenting psychoactive drug websites such as Bluelight and Erowid.

Morris attended the University of Chicago and The New School, where he studied anthropology and chemistry, including under the psychedelic drug expert Nicolas Langlitz. He earned a bachelor of science (BSc) degree in liberal arts from The New School, with his credential described as a "weird interdisciplinary science degree".

== Career ==
Morris began writing for Vice magazine as a college sophomore in February 2008. He initially published under the pseudonym "D. H. Ticklish", with his first article being an Alexander Shulgin-esque write-up of his experiences with ten mostly obscure psychedelic drugs. Subsequently, Morris began writing under his real name and published a piece called "The Magic Jews" in 2008 documenting his experience taking LSD with a group of Hasidic Jews. Vice later hired him to write a monthly print column titled "Hamilton's Pharmacopeia" in 2009 that evolved into a series of articles and documentaries for VBS.tv focused on psychoactive drugs. He was the science editor of Vice magazine in Manhattan by 2013. Morris has also written for Harper's Magazine and the The Brooklyn Rail.

In his Hamilton's Pharmacopeia web series for Vice Media, which ran from 2009 to 2016 and spanned 11 episodes, Morris covered topics including Phyllomedusa bicolor (sapo or kambo), Haitian zombies and tetrodotoxin, Alexander and Ann Shulgin, Krystle Cole and William Leonard Pickard, magic truffles, sensory deprivation tanks with Joe Rogan, zolpidem, efavirenz, cannabinoids, and Matt Bowden. Morris subsequently did his Viceland show Hamilton's Pharmacopeia, which ran for three seasons and spanned 20 episodes, from 2016 until 2021. The show had episodes covering a variety of psychoactive drugs, including LSD, psilocybin, mescaline, bufotenin, DMT, 5-MeO-DMT, methamphetamine, methaqualone (Quaaludes), phencyclidine (PCP), ketamine, xenon, ibogaine, kratom, Salvia divinorum, Amanita muscaria, and hallucinogenic fish, among others. In one episode, Morris revealed Ken Nelson as the author of the 1984 Bufo Alvarius: the Psychedelic Toad of the Sonoran Desert pamphlet, which described how to use Incilius alvarius toad venom containing 5-MeO-DMT as a psychedelic drug. Other topics that Morris has covered or been interested in covering include the Temple of the True Inner Light, Lizard Labs, Ariadne, and 7-OH.

Morris worked part-time as a chemist and pharmacologist in Jason Wallach's lab at the University of the Sciences's Philadelphia College of Pharmacy for more than a decade, from 2010 until at least late 2022. He has coauthored scientific papers on hallucinogens with Wallach, including a 2014 review on dissociatives and a 2023 study identifying serotonergic psychedelics as mediating hallucinogenic-like effects (i.e., the head-twitch response) via activation of the serotonin 5-HT_{2A} receptor G_{q} signaling pathway. In September 2021, Morris left Vice to work as a full-time chemistry consultant at the biotechnology startup, Compass Pathways. Wallach's lab has a contract with Compass Pathways to develop novel psychedelic therapeutics. Although Morris left Vice, he said that he plans to continue to write, podcast, and make additional films in the future. In 2020, Morris started an ongoing podcast called The Hamilton Morris Podcast, interviewing people from the psychoactive drug world.

Morris has personally developed and tested novel psychoactive drugs, such as the psychedelic lysergamide FP-LAD and the tellurium-containing psychedelic phenethylamine 2C-Te. In addition, he has explored and helped characterize obscure existing psychoactive drugs. As an example, Morris reported in the early 2020s, based on self-experimentation and following earlier work by Jonathan Ott, that bufotenin is indeed active as a psychedelic. According to Morris, the effects of this drug are like a cross between those of DMT and 5-MeO-DMT. Other novel psychoactive drug examples characterized by Morris include efavirenz, gaboxadol, 5-bromo-DMT, and α,N,N-TMT. Yet another example is pharmahuasca in the form of the combination of DMT and the synthetic monoamine oxidase inhibitor (MAOI) moclobemide. Besides the preceding informal examples, Morris and Wallach have extensively studied the auditory psychedelic diisopropyltryptamine (DiPT).

Morris has an ongoing conflict with the psychedelic media organization and self-described "watchdog group" Psymposia.

== Reception ==
Morris is considered to be among the world's leading psychoactive drug journalists. His work has been described as gonzo journalism analogous to that of Hunter S. Thompson. In addition, Morris has been said to be "doing for drugs what Anthony Bourdain did for food". He has been credited with helping to change the way society thinks and talks about drugs, with efforts towards the end of drug prohibition.

== Personal life ==
Morris describes himself as scientifically oriented, a hardened and cynical atheist and materialist, and "not spiritual at all", though he is sympathetic to spiritual and shamanic traditions employing entheogens. Some of his personal heroes and influences include Wade Davis and Alexander Shulgin. Morris is a psychonaut and has extensively experimented with psychoactive drugs. He believes in the right to personal freedom regarding psychoactive drugs and altered states of consciousness, has prominently criticized the war on drugs as unsuccessful, harmful, and counterproductive, and advocates for the legalization of all drugs. Morris has been diagnosed with attention deficit hyperactivity disorder (ADHD) and takes stimulant medication for his symptoms. He has also used nootropics.

== Projects ==
Some notable projects of Morris include:

- Hamilton's Pharmacopeia (web series, Vice Media, 2009–2016)
- Hamilton's Pharmacopeia (TV series, Viceland, 2016–2021) (see also concise episode list)
- The Hamilton Morris Podcast (2020–present)

== See also ==
- Bibliography of Hamilton Morris
- List of psychedelic chemists
