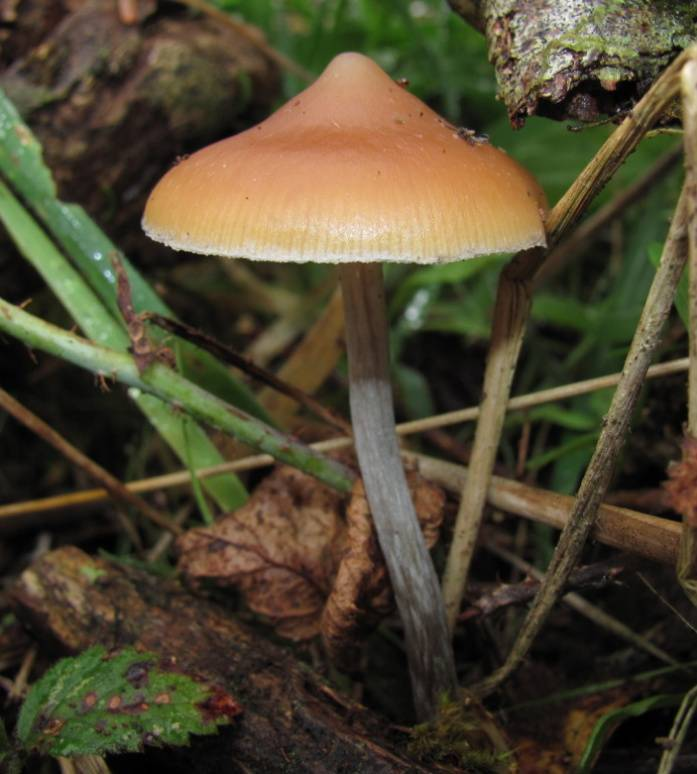

Scientific classification
- Kingdom: Fungi
- Division: Basidiomycota
- Class: Agaricomycetes
- Order: Agaricales
- Family: Hymenogastraceae
- Genus: Psilocybe
- Species: P. azurescens

Binomial name
- Psilocybe azurescens Stamets & Gartz (1995)

= Psilocybe azurescens =

Species of fungus

Psilocybe azurescens
- Mycological characteristics
- Gills on hymenium
- Cap is convex or umbonate
- Hymenium is adnate or sinuate
- Stipe is bare
- Spore print is blackish-brown to purple
- Ecology is saprotrophic
- Edibility is psychoactive

Psilocybe azurescens—commonly known as the flying saucer mushroom, blue angel mushroom, or azure psilocybin mushroom—is a species of psychedelic mushroom whose main active compounds are psilocybin and psilocin. It is among the most potent of the tryptamine-bearing mushrooms, containing up to 1.8% psilocybin, 0.5% psilocin, and 0.4% baeocystin by dry weight, averaging to about 1.1% psilocybin and 0.15% psilocin. It belongs to the family Hymenogastraceae in the order Agaricales.

== Description ==
The cap (pileus) of Psilocybe azurescens is 3–10 cm (1.2–3.9 in) in diameter. It has a conic to convex shape, expanding to broadly convex and eventually flattening with age with a pronounced, persistent broad umbo. Its surface is smooth and viscous when moist, covered by a separable gelatinous pellicle. It is chestnut to ochraceous brown to caramel in color, often becoming pitted with dark blue or bluish black zones. It is hygrophanous, fading to light straw color in drying and strongly bruising blue when damaged. Its margin is even, sometimes irregular and eroded at maturity. At first, it is slightly incurved, though it becomes decurved with time. The cap is translucent striate and often leaves a fibrillose annular zone in the upper regions of the stipe

The lamellae are ascending, and have a sinuate to adnate attachment. They are brown and stain black when injured. They are close, and two-tiered, with whitish edges. The spore print is a dark purplish brown to purplish black.

The stipe is 9–20 cm (3.5–7.9 in) in length and 3–6 mm (0.1–0.2 in). It is thick, silky white to dingy brown with age. It is hollow at maturity, and composed of twisted, cartilaginous tissue. The base of the stipe thickens downwards, is often curved, and is characterized by coarse white aerial tufts of mycelium, often with azure tones. The mycelium surrounding the stipe base is densely rhizomorphic (i.e., root-like), silky white, tenaciously holding the wood-chips together.

The taste of this mushroom is extremely bitter, while it is odorless to starchy smelling.

== Habitat and distribution ==
P. azurescens occurs naturally along a small area of the West Coast of the United States, including in parts of Oregon and California. It has been regularly found as far south as Depoe Bay, Oregon, and as far north as Grays Harbor County, Washington. Its primary locations are clustered around the Columbia River Delta: the first type collections were made in Hammond, Oregon, near Astoria. It is also quite prevalent north of the Columbia River in Washington, from Long Beach north to Westport. Some feral specimens have also been reported in Stuttgart, Germany. While infrequent, the mushroom can sometimes be found around decaying wood in the Willamette Valley of Oregon, which decriminalized psilocybin in 2020. Ilwaco, Washington also has a large population, but harvesting is a potential misdemeanor that is enforced by local law enforcement agencies.

The species' preferred environment ranges from caespitose (growing in tight, separated clusters) to gregarious on deciduous wood-chips and/or in sandy soils rich in lignicolous (woody) debris. The mushroom has an affinity for coastal dune grasses. In aspect it generates an extensive, dense, and tenacious mycelial mat (collyboid). P. azurescens causes the whitening of wood. Fruitings begin in late September and continue until "late December and early January", according to mycologist Paul Stamets. Psilocybe azurescens has been cultivated in many countries including Germany, the Netherlands, New Zealand, the United Kingdom, and its native United States (especially in California, New Mexico, Ohio, Oregon, Washington, Vermont, Wisconsin, and Pennsylvania).

== Legal status ==
Possession and/or cultivation of this species is illegal in a number of countries, including in the United States under federal law. However, in the state of Colorado, as well as through the work of Decriminalize Nature in cities such as of Seattle, Washington; Oakland, California; Santa Cruz, California; and Ann Arbor, Michigan policy to effectively decriminalize possession, cultivation, and sharing of personal amounts of psilocybin mushrooms has passed successfully. It is considered a Class A Drug in New Zealand.

== Effects ==
Wood lover's paralysis, a form of temporary paralysis or weakness, has been reported anecdotally after the ingestion of P. azurescens mushrooms. Baeocystin is present in fruiting bodies, with trace amounts of norbaeocystin. Psilocybin concentration decreases with age.

Alkaloid concentration of fresh psilocybin mushrooms
Name	Psilocybin [% of weight]	Psilocin [% of weight]	Baeocystin [% of weight]	Total [% of weight]
Psilocybe azurescens	1.33	0.2	0.35	2.51
Psilocybe cubensis	0.63	0.60	0.025	1.26

== See also ==
- List of psilocybin mushrooms
