= Jochen Gartz =

German chemist and mycologist

- Born: October 1, 1953; Mansfeld, Germany
- Died: October 15, 2020 (aged 67)
- Occupations: Chemist; Mycologist
- Years active: 1983–2020
- Notable work: Magic Mushrooms Around the World (1996)
- Website: http://www.jochengartz.de/

Jochen Gartz (born 1 October, 1953 - dead 15 October, 2020) was a German chemist and mycologist, Dr. Habil (Doctor Habilitatus) at the Institute of Biotechnology Leipzig University, who studied psilocybin mushrooms as well as other psychoactive plants. He was considered an expert in this field. Among other accomplishments, Gartz is known for discovering aeruginascin, which was originally thought to occur exclusively in Inocybe aeruginascens. He is also known for theorizing that an entourage effect may occur with the combination of different active alkaloids in psilocybin mushrooms besides just psilocybin and for reporting that baeocystin is active as a psychedelic in humans. He also wrote books about hydrogen peroxide as medicine.

== Selected publications ==
=== Books ===
- Gartz, J.; Appelius, C.; Taake, C.; Falk, B. (1996). Magic Mushrooms Around the World: A Scientific Journey Across Cultures and Time : the Case for Challenging Research and Value Systems. LIS Publications. ISBN 978-0-9653399-0-2.
- Gartz, J. (1999). Narrenschwämme: Psychoaktive Pilze rund um die Welt [Magic Mushrooms: Psychoactive Mushrooms Around the World] (in German). Nachtschatten Verlag. ISBN 978-3-03788-494-2.
- Gartz, J. (1999). Halluzinogene in historischen Schriften: eine Anthologie von 1913 - 1968 [Hallucinogens in historical writings: an anthology from 1913 - 1968] (in German). Nachtschatten-Verlag. ISBN 978-3-907080-48-1.
- Gartz, J. (2012). Salvia Divinorum - Die Wahrsagesalbei [Salvia Divinorum - The Divination Sage] (in German). Nachtschatten Verlag. p. 1. ISBN 978-3-03788-252-8.
- Gartz, J. (2019). Psilocybin-Pilze: Neue Arten, ihre Entdeckung und Anwendung [Psilocybin Mushrooms: New Species, Their Discovery and Application] (in German). Nachtschatten Verlag. ISBN 978-3-03788-584-0.
- Gartz, J. (2014). Wasserstoffperoxid: Das vergessene Heilmittel. Mobiwell Verlag. ISBN 978-3-9448870-7-4.
- Gartz, J. (2018). Wasserstoffperoxid: Anwendungen und Heilerfolge. Mobiwell Verlag. ISBN 978-3944887487.

== See also ==
- Gastón Guzmán
- Paul Stamets
- Jonathan Ott
- Church of the Sacred Synthesis
