= Entourage effect =

Proposed mechanism of cannabis compounds

The entourage effect is a hypothesis that cannabis compounds, other than the cannabinoids tetrahydrocannabinol (THC) and cannabidiol (CBD), act synergistically with cannabinoids to modulate the overall psychoactive effects of the plant. The effect has also been applied in the case of psilocybin mushrooms, with other compounds besides psilocybin, such as baeocystin, norbaeocystin, and aeruginascin, having been hypothesized to also contribute to the effects of the mushrooms. Similarly, the entourage effect has been hypothesized for mescaline-containing cacti, where secondary alkaloids may influence the overall experience.

== Compounds ==
=== Terpenes ===
There are numerous terpenes present in the cannabis plant and variation in their contents between strains. Some terpenes are under preliminary research for their possible effects in vivo. Various terpenes have been found to independently influence behavioral outcomes in mice, with simultaneous administration of CBD and terpene blends having a significantly greater impact than either substance administered independently.

== Hypothetical differences between C. indica and C. sativa ==
- Cannabinoid ratios: On average, Cannabis indica has higher levels of THC compared to CBD, whereas Cannabis sativa has lower levels of THC to CBD. However, huge variability exists within either species. A 2015 study shows the average THC content of the most popular herbal cannabis products in the Netherlands has decreased slightly since 2005.
- Terpene ratios: Sativa ancestry is associated with farnesene and bergamotene, while Indica ancestry is associated with myrcene, elemene, and sesquiterpene alcohols.

=== Criticism ===
In 2022, studies found that plants identified as "indica" or "sativa" based on common methods of differentiation (e.g. plant height or leaf shape) are not, in fact, chemically distinguishable, with many identified as "sativa" having cannabinoid ratios predicted of "indica" plants and vice versa. The authors have concluded that the chemical makeup of cannabis plants cannot be reliably determined by simple inspection of the plants' physical characteristics and that the "indica" and "sativa" labels are not informative as to the cannabinoids (or other chemical components) delivered.

== Background ==
The phrase entourage effect was introduced in 1999. While originally identified as a novel method of endocannabinoid regulation by which multiple endogenous chemical species display a cooperative effect in eliciting a cellular response, the term has evolved to describe the polypharmacy effects of combined cannabis phytochemicals or whole plant extracts. The phrase now commonly refers to the compounds present in cannabis purportedly working in concert to create "the sum of all the parts that leads to the magic or power of cannabis". Other cannabinoids, terpenoids, and flavonoids may be part of an entourage effect.

== Criticism ==
A 2020 review of research found no entourage effect in most studies, while other reports claimed mixed results, including the possibility of increased adverse effects. The review concluded that the term, "entourage effect", is unfounded and used mainly for marketing.
