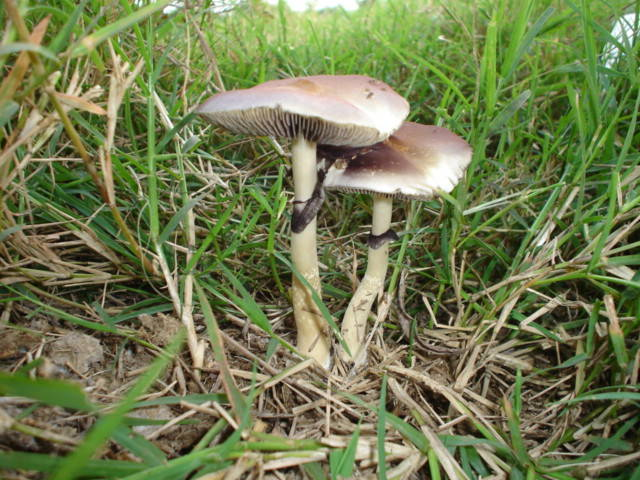

Scientific classification
- Domain: Eukaryota
- Kingdom: Fungi
- Division: Basidiomycota
- Class: Agaricomycetes
- Order: Agaricales
- Family: Hymenogastraceae
- Genus: Psilocybe
- Species: P. subcubensis

Binomial name
- Psilocybe subcubensis Guzmán

Synonyms
- Psilocybe jaliscana Guzmán (2000)

= Psilocybe subcubensis =

Species of fungus

Psilocybe subcubensis is an entheogenic species of mushroom in the family Hymenogastraceae. The mushroom contains the chemical compounds psilocybin and psilocin. Psilocybe subcubensis was first described by Mexican mycologist Gaston Guzman. It is the pantropical sister species of Psilocybe cubensis. It is macroscopically identical to P. cubensis but has smaller spores.

== See also ==
- List of Psilocybin mushrooms
- Psilocybin mushrooms
- Psilocybe
