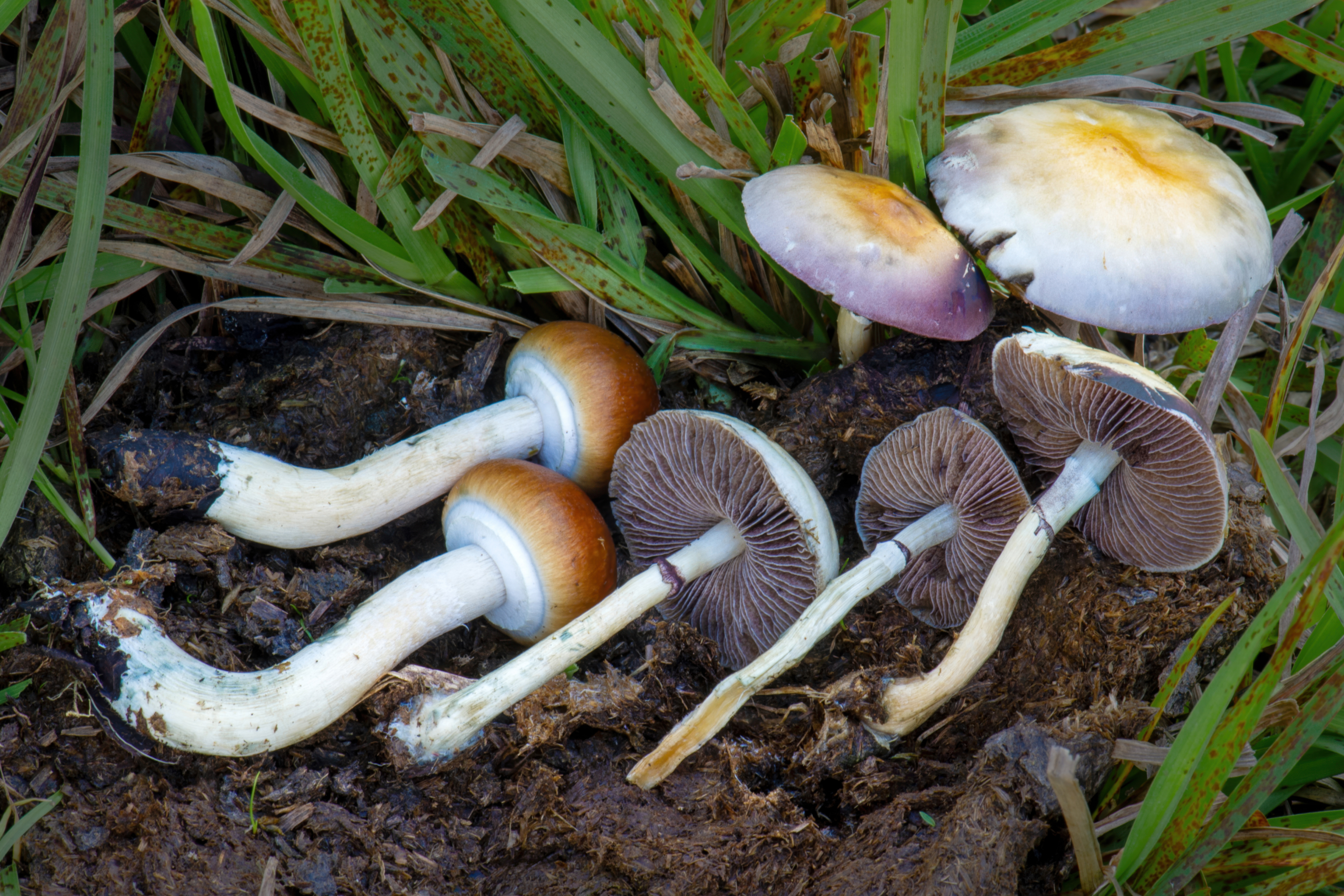

Scientific classification
- Kingdom: Fungi
- Division: Basidiomycota
- Class: Agaricomycetes
- Order: Agaricales
- Family: Hymenogastraceae
- Genus: Psilocybe
- Species: P. cubensis

Binomial name
- Psilocybe cubensis (Earle) Singer

Synonyms
- Stropharia cubensis Earle; Stropharia cyanescens Murrill; Naematoloma caerulescens Pat. Hypholoma caerulescens (Pat.) Sacc. & Trotter

= Psilocybe cubensis =

Species of fungus

Psilocybe cubensis
- Mycological characteristics
- Gills on hymenium
- Cap is convex or flat
- Hymenium is adnate or adnexed
- Stipe has a ring
- Spore print is purple
- Ecology is saprotrophic
- Edibility is psychoactive

Psilocybe cubensis, commonly known as the magic mushroom, shroom, golden halo, cube, gold cap, or bluestain smoothcap, is a species of psilocybin mushroom of moderate potency whose principal active compounds are psilocybin and psilocin. It belongs to the fungus family Hymenogastraceae and was previously known as Stropharia cubensis. It is the best-known psilocybin mushroom due to its wide distribution and ease of cultivation.

== Taxonomy ==
The species was first described in 1906 as Stropharia cubensis by American mycologist Franklin Sumner Earle in Cuba. In 1907, it was identified as Naematoloma caerulescens in Tonkin (now Vietnam) by French pharmacist and mycologist Narcisse Théophile Patouillard, while in 1941, it was called Stropharia cyanescens by William Alphonso Murrill near Gainesville in Florida. German-born mycologist Rolf Singer moved the species into the genus Psilocybe in 1949, giving it the binomial name Psilocybe cubensis. The synonyms were later also assigned to the species Psilocybe cubensis.

The name Psilocybe is derived from the Ancient Greek roots psilos (ψιλος) and kubê (κυβη), and translates as "bare head". Cubensis means "coming from Cuba", and refers to the type locality published by Earle.

Singer divided P. cubensis into three varieties: the nominate, which usually had a brownish cap, Murrill's cyanescens from Florida, which generally had a pale cap, and var caerulascens from Indochina with a more yellowish cap.

Psilocybe cubensis is commonly known as gold top, golden top or gold cap in Australia, sacred mushroom or blue mushroom in Brazil, and San Ysidro or Palenque mushroom in the United States and Mexico, while the term "magic mushroom" has been applied to hallucinogenic mushrooms in general. It is commonly known as "Golden teacher" in South Africa. A common name in Thai is "Hed keequai", which translates as "mushroom which appears after water buffalo defecates".

Between 2013 and 2022, several samples of an unknown species of Psilocybe mushroom were collected. These samples bore similar superficial characteristics to P. cubensis, as well as similar habit and habitat. Microscopic and genetic testing of these samples led to the conclusion that they were closely related but different species, estimated to have shared a common ancestor some time in the last 3 million years. The new species bears the provisional name Psilocybe ochraceocentrata.

== Description ==
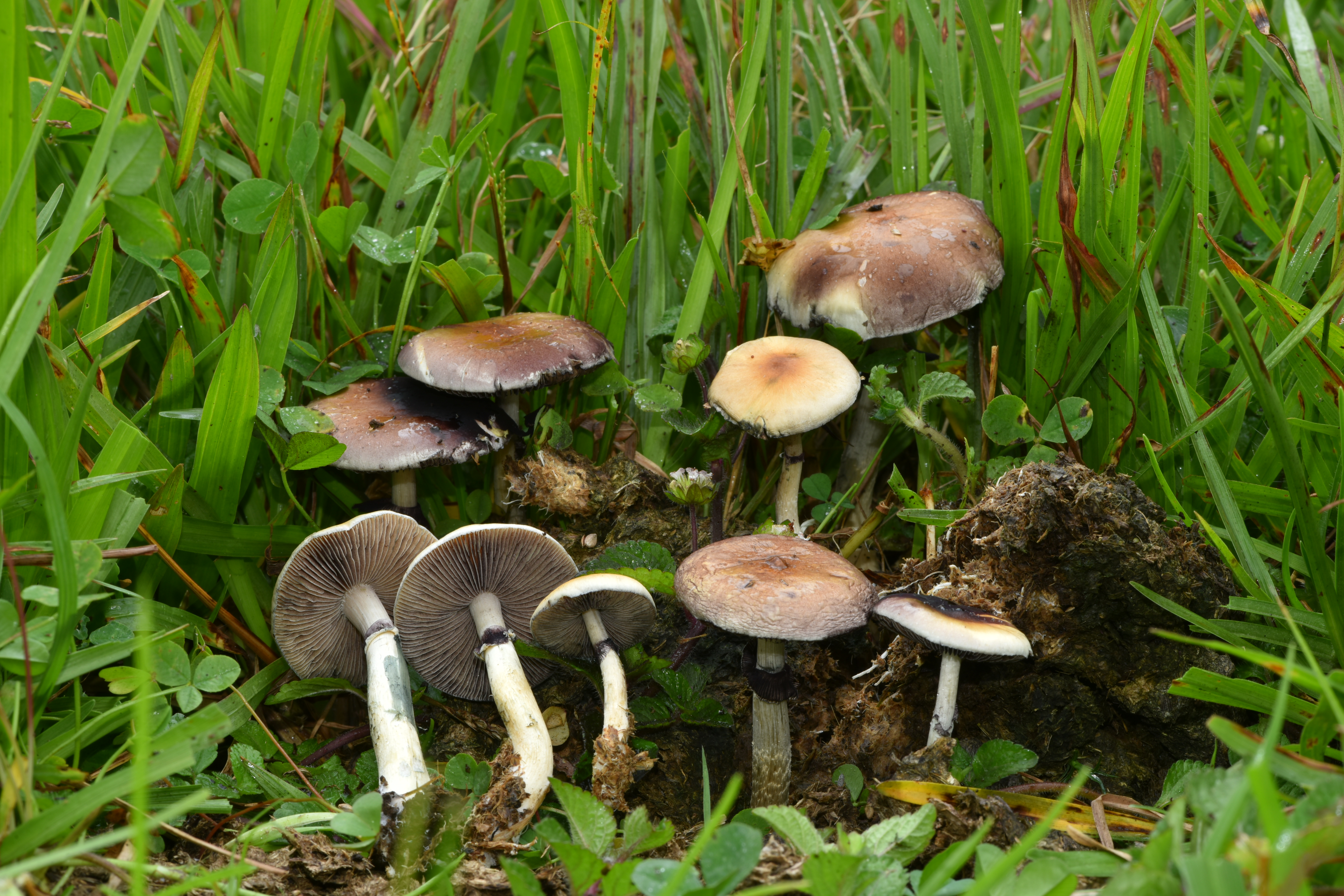
Psilocybe cubensis

The cap is 1.6–8 cm (3/4–3 1/4 in), conic to convex with a central papilla when young, becoming broadly convex to plane with age, retaining a slight umbo sometimes surrounded by a ring-shaped depression. The cap surface is smooth and sticky, sometimes with white universal veil remnants attached. The cap is brown becoming paler to almost white at the margin and fades to more golden-brown or yellowish with age. When bruised, all parts of the mushroom stain blue. The narrow grey gills are adnate to adnexed, sometimes seceding attachment, and darken to purplish-black and somewhat mottled with age. The gill edges remain whitish. The hollow white stipe is 4–15 cm (2–6 in) high by 0.4–1.4 cm (1/4–1/2 in) thick, becoming yellowish in age. The well-developed veil leaves a persistent white membranous ring whose surface usually becomes the same color as the gills because of falling spores. The fruiting bodies are 90% water. The mushroom has no odor and has been described as tasting farinaceous, with an alkaline or metallic aftertaste. The spores are 11.5–17.3 x 8–11.5 μm, sub-ellipsoid, basidia 4-spored but sometimes 2- or 3-, pleurocystidia and cheilocystidia present.

=== Similar species ===
The related species Psilocybe subcubensis—found in tropical regions—is indistinguishable but has smaller spores. Panaeolus semiovatus can appear similar but does not stain. Psilocybe ochraceocentrata, native to Southern Africa, is closely related to Psilocybe cubensis.

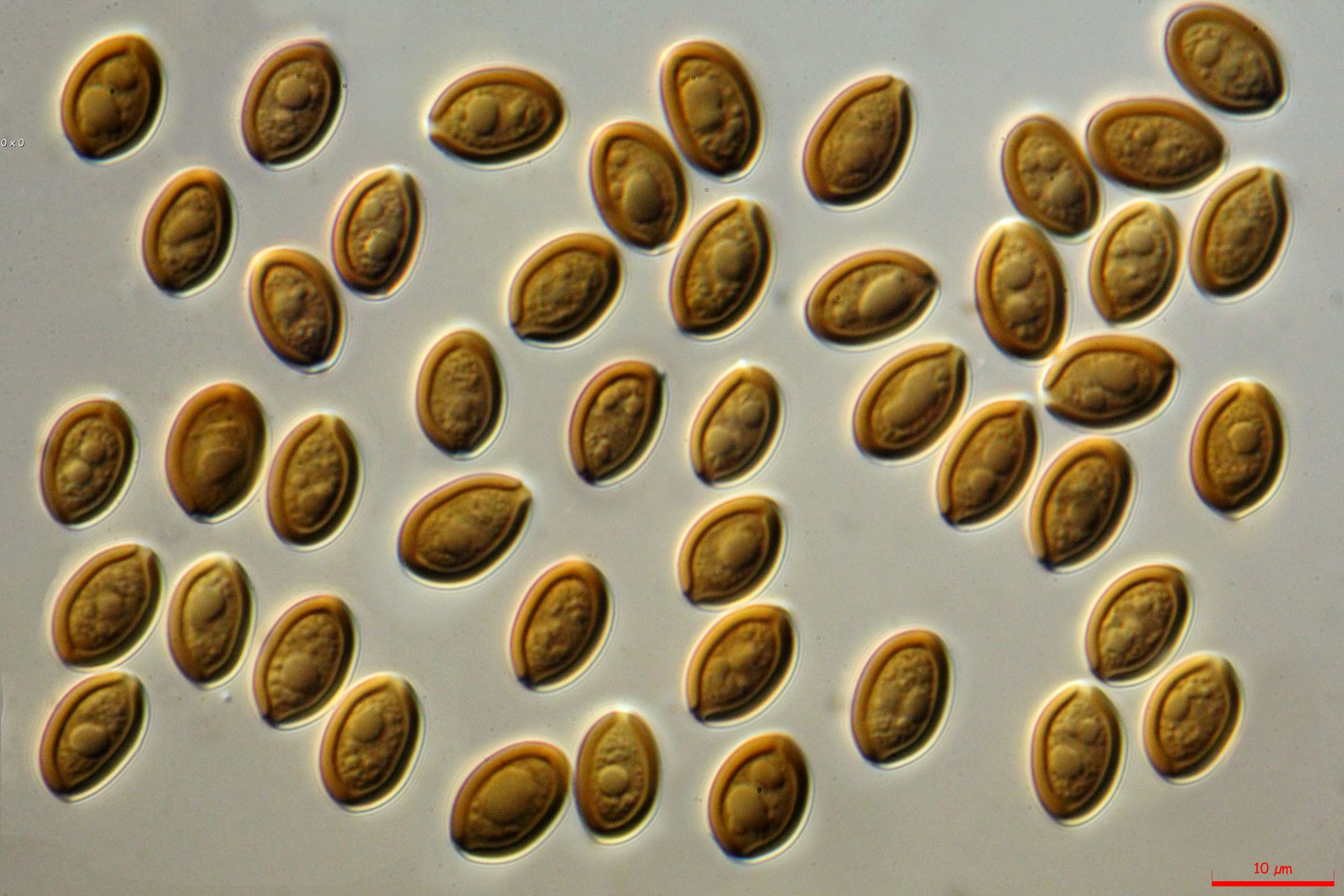
Psilocybe cubensis spores, 1000x

== Distribution and habitat ==
Psilocybe cubensis is a pan-tropical species, occurring in the Gulf Coast states and southeastern United States, Mexico, in the Central American countries of Belize, Costa Rica, Panamá, El Salvador and Guatemala, the Caribbean countries Cuba, the Dominican Republic, Puerto Rico, Guadalupe, Martinique, and Trinidad, in the South American countries of Argentina, Bolivia, Brazil, Colombia, French Guiana, Paraguay, Uruguay and Peru, Southeast Asia, including Thailand, Vietnam, Cambodia and Malaysia, India, Australia, Fiji, and possibly Nepal and Hawaii.

Psilocybe cubensis is found on cow (and occasionally horse) dung, sugar cane mulch or rich pasture soil, with mushrooms appearing from February to December in the northern hemisphere, and November to April in the southern hemisphere. In Asia, the species grows on water buffalo dung. Along with other fungi that grow on cow dung, P. cubensis is thought to have colonized Australia with the introduction of cattle there, 1800 of which were on the Australian mainland by 1803—having been transported there from the Cape of Good Hope, Kolkata and the American west coast. In Australia, the species grows between northern Queensland to southern New South Wales.

In March 2018, several Psilocybe cubensis specimens were collected in Zimbabwe in the Wedza District of Mashonaland East province, approx. 120 km southeast of Harare. This was the first reported occurrence of a psilocybin mushroom in Zimbabwe. The mushrooms were collected on Imire Rhino & Wildlife Conservation—a nature reserve that is home to both wildlife and cattle, as well as cattle egrets.

== Relationship with cattle ==
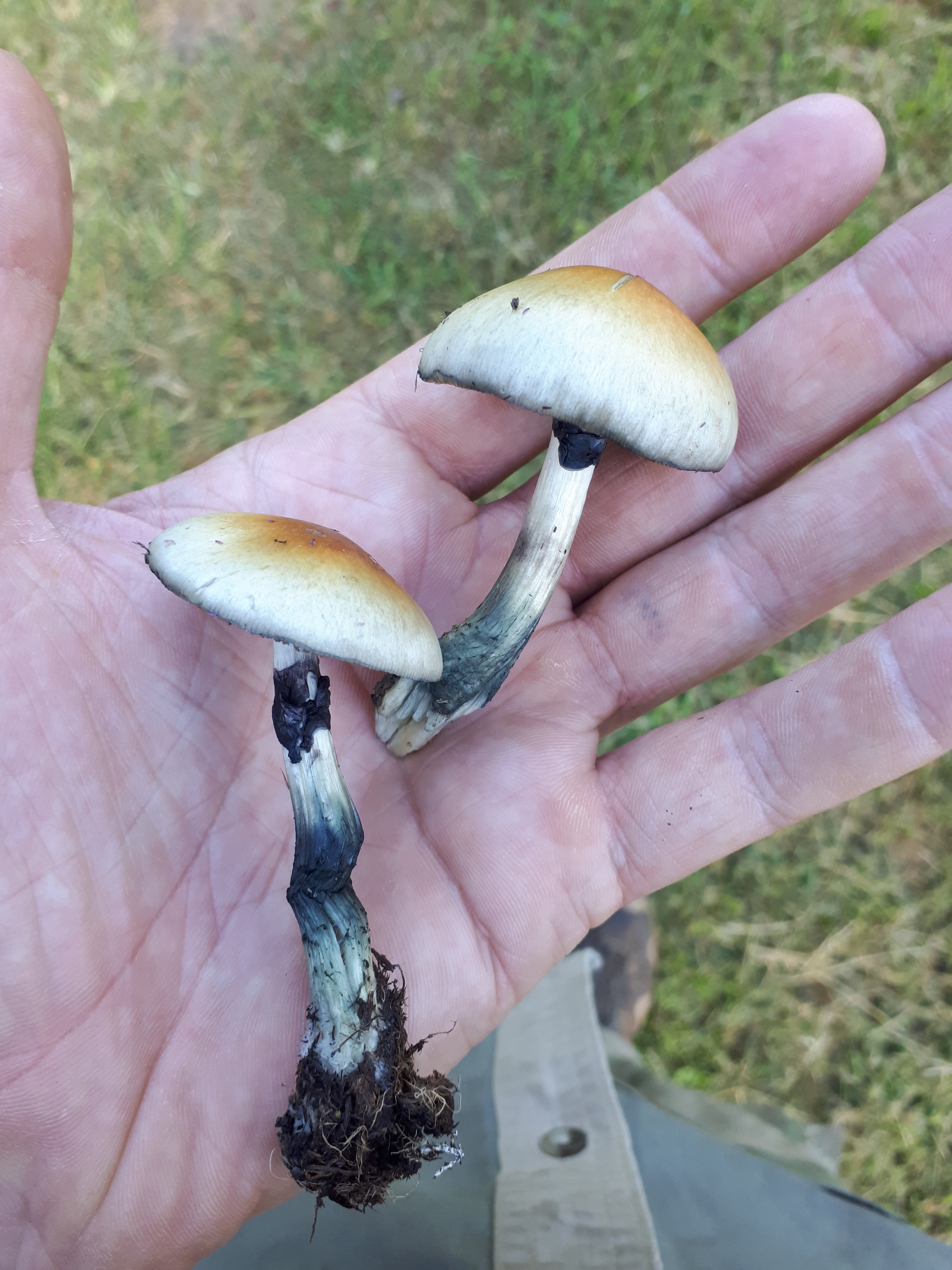
Psilocybe cubensis, Zimbabwe

Because Psilocybe cubensis is intimately associated with cattle ranching, the fungus has found unique dispersal niches not available to most other members of the family Hymenogastraceae. Of particular interest is the cattle egret (Bubulcus ibis), a colonizer of Old World origin (via South America), whose range of distribution overlaps much of that of Psilocybe cubensis. Cattle egrets typically walk alongside cattle, preying on insects; they track through spore-laden vegetation and cow dung and transfer the spores to suitable habitats, often thousands of miles away during migration activities. This type of spore dispersal is known as zoochory, and it enables a parent species to propagate over a much greater range than it could achieve alone. The relationship between cattle, cattle egrets, and Psilocybe cubensis is an example of symbiosis—a situation in which dissimilar organisms live together in close association.

== Cultivation ==
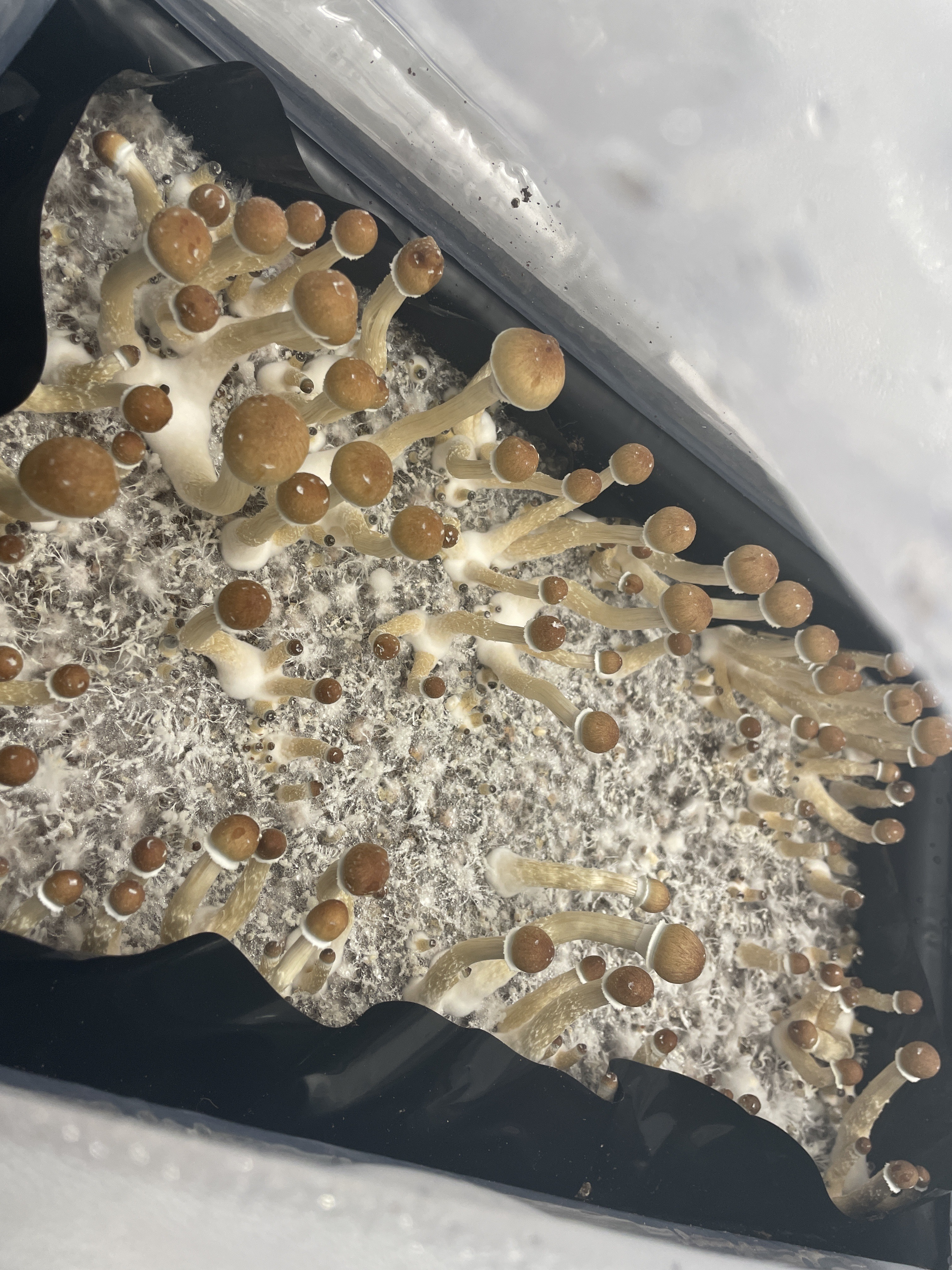
Cultivation of Psilocybe cubensis

Psilocybe cubensis grows naturally in tropical and subtropical conditions, often near cattle due to the ideal conditions they provide for the growth of the fungus. The cow usually consumes grains or grass covered with the spores of P. cubensis and the fungus will begin to germinate within the dung.

Mushrooms such as Psilocybe cubensis are relatively easy to cultivate indoors. First, spores are inoculated within sterilized jars or bags, colloquially known as grainspawn, containing a form of carbohydrate nutrient such as rye or milo grains. After approximately one month, the spores fully colonize the grain spawn forming dense mycelium, which is then mixed within a bulk substrate such as a coconut husk fiber and vermiculite mixture. Given proper humidity, temperature, and fresh air exchange, the substrate will produce fruiting Psilocybe cubensis bodies within a month of planting. To preserve potency after harvesting, growers often dehydrate the fruit and store them in air-tight containers in cool environments.

A study conducted in 2009 showed that mushrooms grown in the dark had higher levels of psilocybin and psilocin compared to the mushrooms grown in bright, indirect light, which had minimum levels.

Studies were conducted where an environmentally controlled wind tunnel and a computer program were used to determine the influence of humidity on the individual basidiocarps of P. cubensis which aided in mapping their growth and development. The transpiration and growth of the mushroom were heavily influenced by the humidity of the air, and the transpiration was accelerated at higher humidities while light did not affect the growth. Faster growth was observed at higher humidities. It was also discovered that misting enhanced both the growth and transpiration rates in the growing process of P. cubensis.

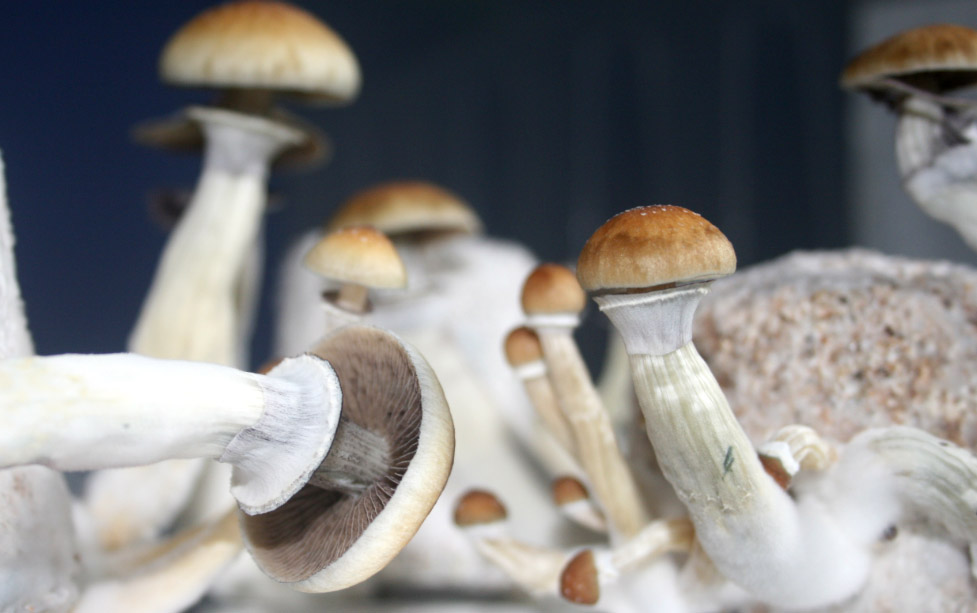
Mushrooms grown with PF-Tek

Small-scale cultivation of P. cubensis is often accomplished with "cakes" that colonize within jars, but fruit inside specially designed tubs called "shotgun fruiting chambers". The most common cake method for beginners is PF-Tek ("Psilocybe Fanaticus technique"), named after Psylocybe Fanaticus, the clandestine cultivator credited for its creation. Cakes are popular for the new cultivator because of their simplicity and low cost of startup materials. As cakes are composed of brown rice flour, vermiculite, and gypsum, they can be steam-sterilized in a large pot. Unlike cereal grains used in bulk growing, brown rice flour contains no bacterial endospores, a contamination vector requiring a pressure cooker to sterilize.

The "Uncle Ben's Tek", also known as Spiderman Tek and Instant Rice Tek, is a growing method using microwavable rice sachets. This technique involves utilizing pre-sterilized rice bags for mycelium to colonize upon. Though Uncle Ben's Tek is largely popular among beginners due to its low cost, it faces criticism from those more experienced due to its high rate of contamination compared to other techniques.

Other Teks exist, such as Lemon-Tek and Bucket-Tek, though all Tek's do not refer to methods for growth. Rather, they refer to knowledge regarding the cultivation, harvest, processing, and consumption for psychedelic fungi. TEK stands for Traditional Ecological Knowledge, though others claim it stands for Time Experience Knowledge or is simply a shortening of the term 'technique'.

Cultivation methods resulting in larger yields are categorized as "bulk growing". Bulk growing allows cultivators to operate on a larger scale, but require a greater investment of time, money, and knowledge. While small-scale grows utilize spore syringes to inject spore solution into cakes, bulk methods instead use grain spawn as primary nutrition for the subsequent growth. Additionally, cultivators must develop solid sterile technique in working with agar. Instead of inoculating grain with spores, growers instead germinate spores on agar plates, then transfer the resultant healthy mycelium to the grain jars. Once the grain is colonized with clean mycelial growth, users inoculate their bulk substrates with the grain in a process known as "spawning." Bulk substrates are frequently a mix of coir, vermiculite and gypsum due to not requiring pasteurization or sterilization. However, some utilize blends of manure-based substrates or straw; substrates which always require pasteurization with open-air spawning. After spawning, the healthy mycelium will colonize the bulk substrate, and given proper conditions, eventually fruit mushrooms.

Terence and Dennis McKenna made P. cubensis particularly famous when they published Psilocybin: Magic Mushroom Grower's Guide in the 1970s upon their return from the Amazon rainforest, having deduced new methods (based on pre-existing techniques originally described by J.P. San Antonio) for growing psilocybin mushrooms and assuring their audience that P. cubensis were amongst the easiest psilocybin-containing mushrooms to cultivate.

The potency of cultivated specimens can vary widely per each flush (harvest). In a classic paper published by Jeremy Bigwood and M.W. Beug, it was shown that with each flush, psilocybin levels varied somewhat unpredictably but were much the same on the first flush as they were on the last flush; however, psilocin was typically absent in the first two flushes but peaked by the fourth flush, making it the most potent. Two strains were also analyzed to determine potency in caps and stems: In one strain the caps contained generally twice as much psilocybin as the stems, but the small amount of psilocin present was entirely in the stems. In the other strain, a trace of psilocin was present in the cap but not in the stem; the cap and stem contained equal amounts of psilocybin. The study concluded that the levels of psilocybin and psilocin vary by over a factor of four in cultures of P. cubensis grown under controlled conditions.

== Psychedelic and entheogenic use ==
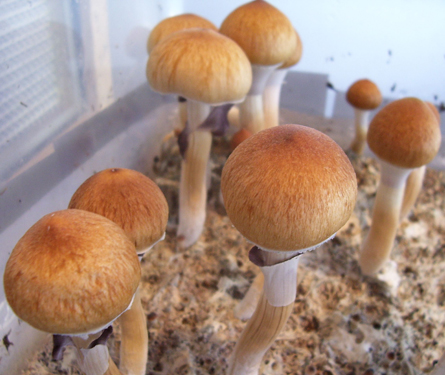
Psilocybe cubensis

Singer noted in 1949 that Psilocybe cubensis had psychoactive properties.

In Australia, the use of psychoactive mushrooms grew rapidly between 1969 and 1975.

In a 1992 paper, locals and tourists in Thailand were reported to consume P. cubensis and related species in mushroom omelets—particularly in Ko Samui and Ko Pha-ngan. At times, omelets were adulterated with LSD, resulting in prolonged intoxication. A thriving subculture had developed in the region. Other localities, such as Hat Yai, Ko Samet, and Chiang Mai, also had some reported usage.

In 1996, jars of honey containing Psilocybe cubensis were confiscated at the Dutch-German border. Upon examination, it was revealed that jars of honey containing psychedelic mushrooms were being sold at Dutch coffee shops.

P. cubensis is one of the most widely known of the psilocybin-containing mushrooms used for triggering psychedelic experiences after ingestion. Its major alkaloids are:

- Psilocybin (4-phosphoryloxy-N,N-dimethyltryptamine)
- Psilocin (4-hydroxy-N,N-dimethyltryptamine)
- Baeocystin (4-phosphoryloxy-N-methyltryptamine)
- Norbaeocystin (4-phosphoryloxytryptamine)
- Aeruginascin (N,N,N-trimethyl-4-phosphoryloxytryptamine)

The potential psychoactivity of other compounds other than psilocybin and psilocin has been speculated but not confirmed.

The concentrations of psilocin and psilocybin, as determined by high-performance liquid chromatography, are in the range of 0.14–0.42% (wet weight) and 0.37–1.30% (dry weight) in the whole mushroom 0.17–0.78% (wet weight) and 0.44–1.35% (dry weight) in the cap, and 0.09%–0.30% (wet weight) and 0.05–1.27% (dry weight) in the stem, respectively. For quickly and practically measuring the psychoactive contents of most healthy Psilocybe cubensis varieties, it can generally be assumed that there is approximately 15 mg (± 5 mg) of psilocybin per gram of dried mushroom. Furthermore, due to factors such as age and storage method, the psilocybin and psilocin content of a given sample of mushrooms will vary.

Individual body composition, brain chemistry and psychological predisposition play a significant role in determining appropriate doses. For a modest psychedelic effect, a minimum of one gram of dried Psilocybe cubensis mushrooms is ingested orally, 0.25–1 gram is usually sufficient to produce a mild effect, 1–2.5 grams usually provides a moderate effect and 2.5 grams and higher usually produces strong effects. For most people, 3.5 dried grams (1/8 oz) would be considered a high dose and may produce an intense experience; this is, however, typically considered a standard dose among recreational users. Body composition (usually weight) should be taken into account when calculating dosage. For many individuals, doses above three grams may be overwhelming. For a few rare people, doses as small as 0.25 gram can produce full-blown effects normally associated with very high doses. For most people, however, that dose level would have virtually no effects.

There are many different ways to ingest Psilocybe cubensis. Users may prefer to take them raw, freshly harvested, or dried and preserved. It is also possible to prepare culinary dishes such as pasta or tea with the mushrooms. However, the psychoactive compounds begin to break down rapidly at temperatures exceeding 100 °C (212 °F). Another method of ingestion known as "Lemon Tekking" involves combining pulverized Psilocybe cubensis with a concentrated citrus juice with a pH of ~2. Many users believe that a considerable amount of the psilocybin will have been dephosphorylated into psilocin, the psychoactive metabolite, by citric acid. However, this claim is not substantiated by the literature on the metabolism of psilocybin, as dephosphorylation is known to be mediated by the enzyme alkaline phosphatase in humans. It is therefore more likely that citric acid mostly helps in breakdown of mushroom cells, aiding in digestion and psilocybin release. The "Lemon Tek" method of consumption results in a more rapid onset and can offer easier digestion or reduced "come-up pressure" associated with raw consumption.

Upon ingestion, effects usually begin after approximately 20–60 minutes (depending on the method of ingestion and stomach contents) and may last from four to ten hours, depending on dosage, potency of cultivar, and individual biochemistry. Visual distortions often occur, including walls that seem to breathe, a vivid enhancement of colors, and the animation of organic shapes.

The effects of high doses can be overwhelming depending on the particular phenotype of cubensis, grow method, and the individual. It is recommended not to eat wild mushrooms without properly identifying them as they may be poisonous. In particular, similar species include mushrooms of the genus Galerina and Pholiotina rugosa—all potentially deadly—and Chlorophyllum molybdites. All of these grow in pastures, a similar habitat to that preferred by P. cubensis.

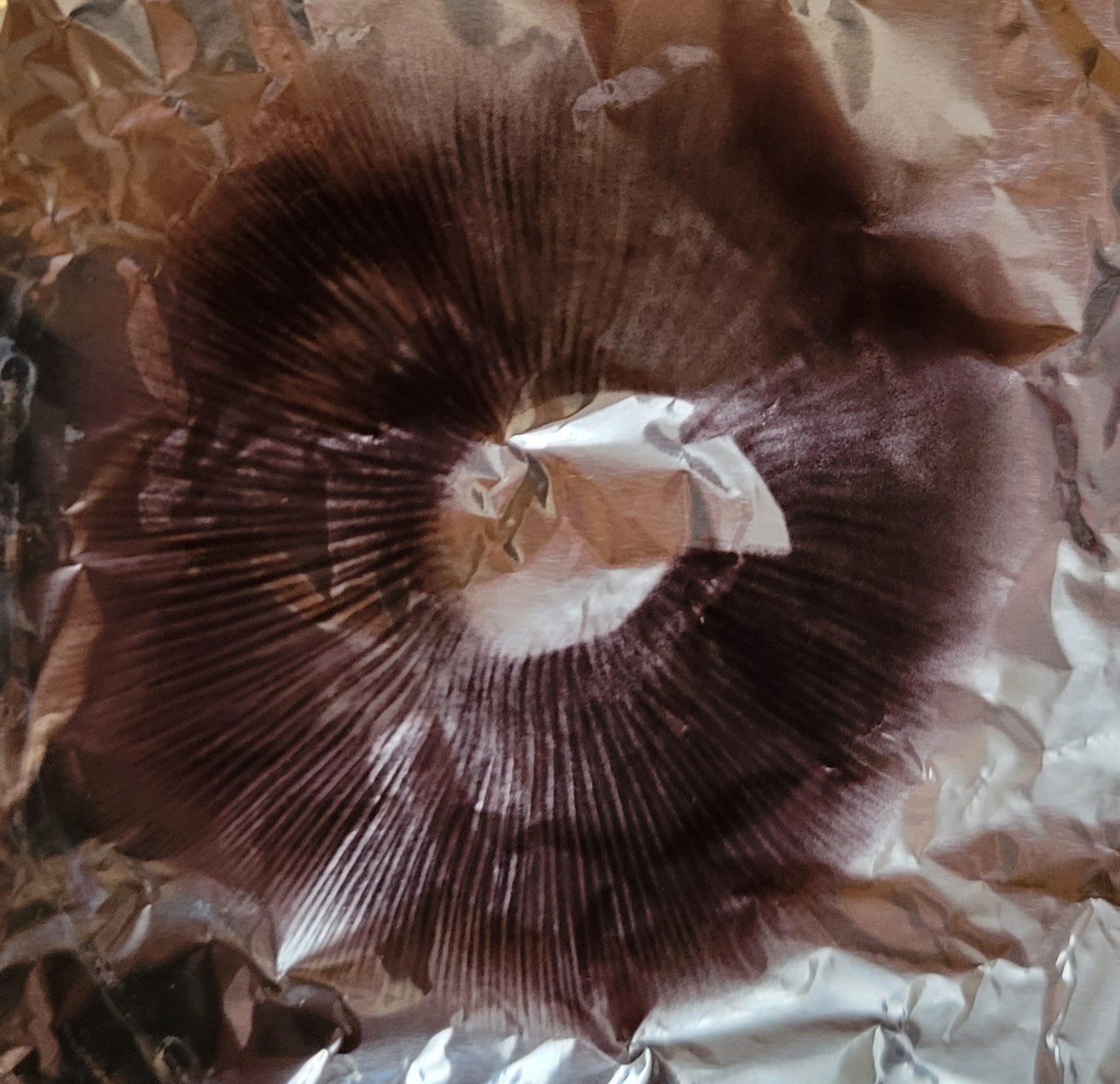
Spore print of Psilocybe cubensis

In 2019, a 15-year-old boy suffered from transient kidney failure after eating P. cubensis from a cultivation kit in Canada. No one else in the group suffered any ill effects.

=== Legality ===
Psilocybin and psilocin are listed as Schedule I drugs under the United Nations 1971 Convention on Psychotropic Substances. However, mushrooms containing psilocybin and psilocin are not unlawful in some parts of the world. For example, in Brazil they are legal, but extractions from the mushroom containing psilocybin and psilocin remain unlawful. In the United States, growing or possessing Psilocybe cubensis mushrooms is unlawful in all states, but it is legal to possess and buy the spores for microscopy purposes. However, Denver, Colorado, decriminalized them for those 21 and up on May 8, 2019. Oakland, California, followed suit, decriminalizing psilocybin-containing mushrooms as well as the peyote cactus on June 4, 2019. Santa Cruz, California, decriminalized naturally occurring psychedelics, including psilocybin mushrooms, on January 29, 2020. On November 3, 2020, the state of Oregon decriminalized possession of psilocybin mushrooms for recreational use and granted licensed practitioners permission to administer psilocybin mushrooms to individuals age 21 years and older.

In 1978, the Florida Supreme Court ruled in Fiske vs Florida that possession of psilocybin mushrooms is not unlawful, in that the mushrooms cannot be considered a "container" for psilocybin based on how the law is written, i.e., it does not specifically state that psilocybin mushrooms themselves are unlawful, but that the hallucinogenic constituents in them are. According to this decision, the applicable statute as framed imparts no information as to which plants may contain psilocybin in its natural state and does not advise a person of ordinary intelligence that this substance is contained in a particular variety of mushroom. The statute, therefore, cannot constitutionally be applied to the appellant.

The production, sale, and possession of magic mushrooms is unlawful in Canada.

== See also ==
- List of psilocybin mushrooms
- List of psychoactive plants, fungi, and animals
- Botanical identity of soma-haoma
- Psilocybin decriminalization in the United States
