= Cinobufotenine =

Names
- IUPAC name 2-(5-hydroxy-1H-indol-3-yl)ethyl-trimethylazanium
- Other names Bufotenium; Bufoteninium; 5-HTQ; 5-Hydroxy-N,N,N-trimethyltryptaminium

Identifiers
CAS Number	60657-23-0
3D model (JSmol)	Interactive image
ChEBI	CHEBI:31879
ChEMBL	ChEMBL317971
ChemSpider	571043
KEGG	C13664
PubChem CID	656705
CompTox Dashboard (EPA)	DTXSID90209469
- InChI: InChI=1S/C13H18N2O/c1-15(2,3)7-6-10-9-14-13-5-4-11(16)8-12(10)13/h4-5,8-9,14H,6-7H2,1-3H3/p+1 Key: HIYGARYIJIZXGW-UHFFFAOYSA-O
- SMILES: C[N+](C)(C)CCC1=CNC2=C1C=C(C=C2)O

Properties
Chemical formula	C_{13}H_{19}N_{2}O
Molar mass	219.308 g·mol^{−1}
- Except where otherwise noted, data are given for materials in their standard state (at 25 °C [77 °F], 100 kPa). Infobox references

Cinobufotenine, also known as bufotenium, bufoteninium, or 5-hydroxy-N,N,N-trimethyltryptaminium, is a quaternary ammonium cation as well as a derivative of 5-hydroxytryptamine, It is the parent compound for bufotenidine. The compound is a powerful stimulant of the parasympathetic ganglia, activates nicotine-sensitive acetylcholine receptors, сinobufotenine is highly active on the ileum. It is contained within the skin of certain toads (Bufo gargarizans).

Bufotenidine, also known as 5-hydroxy-N,N,N-trimethyltryptammonium (5-HTQ) or as cinobufagine, is an indole toxin related to bufotenin, serotonin, and other tryptamines which is found in the venom of a variety of toads. It acts as a selective serotonin 5-HT_{3} receptor agonist, and has been used in scientific research to study the function of the serotonin 5-HT_{3} receptor, though this use has been limited by the fact that, as a quaternary amine, it is unable to readily cross the blood-brain-barrier and hence is peripherally selective.

Bufotenium is the quaternary ammonium cation form of bufotenidine, exhibits nicotine-like activity; activates nicotine-sensitive acetylcholine receptors.

== Differences ==
Cinobufotenine is similar to bufotenidine in that it does not readily cross the blood-brain barrier and is therefore peripherally selective. Cinobufotenine has very little activity or low affinity at the 5-hydroxytryptamine receptor, possessing less than one thousandth the potency of 5-hydroxytryptamine. and also has a stimulation of cardiac activity, ten times less than the activity of adrenaline chloride, has a low miotic effect and increases the tone of the isolated intestine and uterus.

Bufotenidine
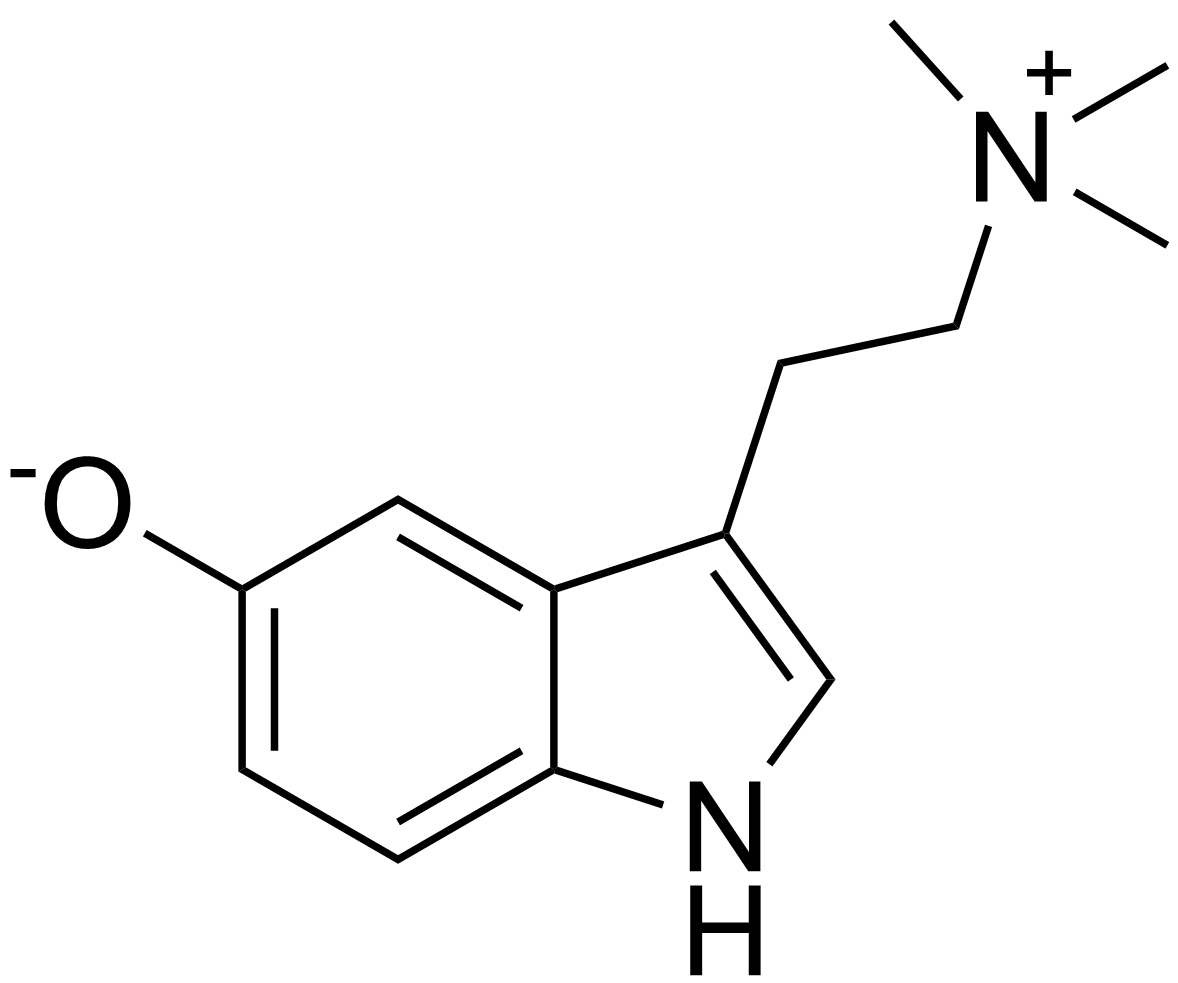

Names
- Preferred IUPAC name 3-[2-(Trimethylazaniumyl)ethyl]-1H-indol-5-olate
- Other names Bufotenidin; Cinobufagine; N,N,N-Trimethylserotonin; 5-Hydroxy-N,N,N-trimethyltryptammonium; 5-HTQ

Identifiers
CAS Number	487-91-2
3D model (JSmol)	Interactive image
ChemSpider	2340772
PubChem CID	3083591
UNII	J3C2F8ZLY5
CompTox Dashboard (EPA)	DTXSID90209469
- InChI: InChI=1S/C13H18N2O/c1-15(2,3)7-6-10-9-14-13-5-4-11(16)8-12(10)13/h4-5,8-9,14H,6-7H2,1-3H3 Key: HIYGARYIJIZXGW-UHFFFAOYSA-N; InChI=1/C13H18N2O/c1-15(2,3)7-6-10-9-14-13-5-4-11(16)8-12(10)13/h4-5,8-9,14H,6-7H2,1-3H3 Key: HIYGARYIJIZXGW-UHFFFAOYAI
- SMILES: C[N+](C)(C)CCC1=CNC2=C1C=C(C=C2)[O-]

Properties
Chemical formula	C_{13}H_{18}N_{2}O
Molar mass	218.300 g·mol^{−1}
- Except where otherwise noted, data are given for materials in their standard state (at 25 °C [77 °F], 100 kPa). verify (what is ?) Infobox references

== See also ==
- Substituted tryptamine
- 4-HO-TMT
- Aeruginascin
- 2-Methyl-5-HT
- Chlorophenylbiguanide
