= 4-HO-TMT =

Serotonergic compound

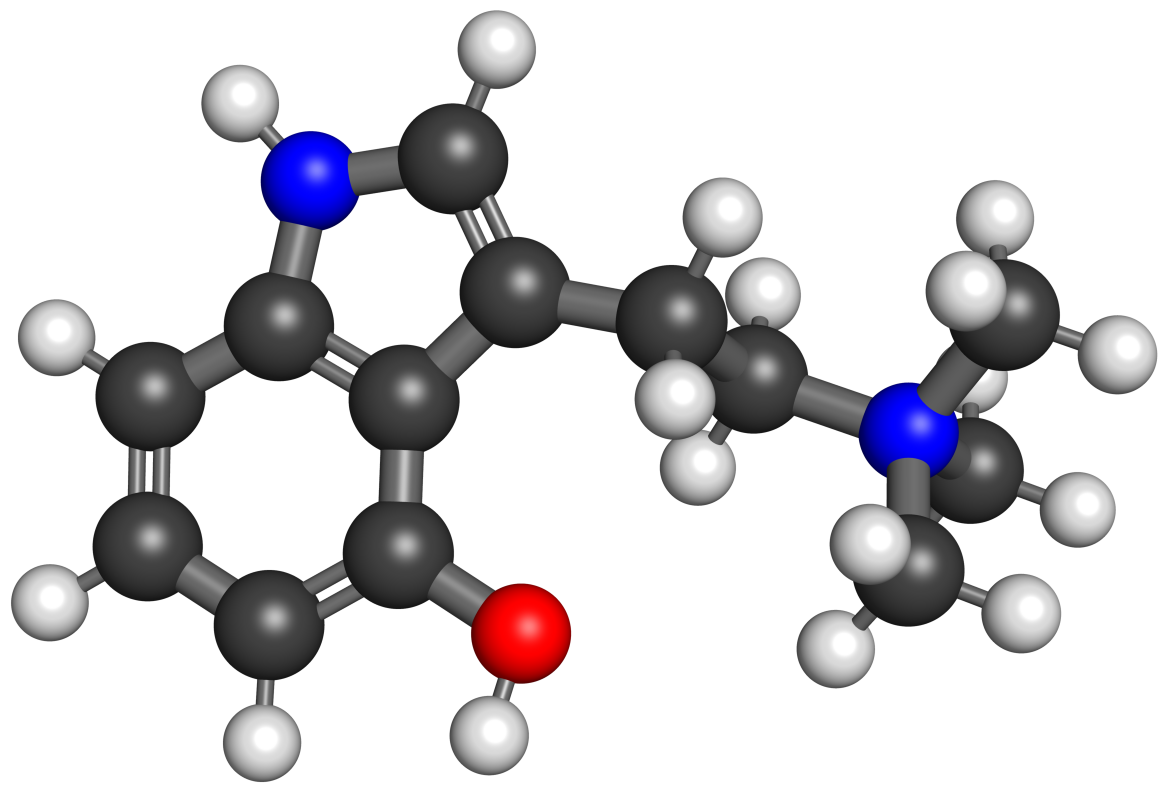

Clinical data
- Other names: 4-OH-TMT; 4-hydroxy-N,N,N-trimethyltryptammonium; 4-Hydroxy-N,N,N-trimethyltryptamine; 4-HO-N,N,N-TMT; Dephosphorylated aeruginascin; Dephosphorylaeruginascin
- Drug class: Serotonin receptor agonist
- ATC code: None

Identifiers
- IUPAC name: 2-(4-hydroxy-1H-indol-3-yl)ethyl-trimethylazanium
- CAS Number: 262285-41-6
- PubChem CID: 17868117
- ChemSpider: 13318696
- ChEBI: CHEBI:193061

Chemical and physical data
- Formula: C_{13}H_{19}N_{2}O^{+}
- Molar mass: 219.308 g·mol^{−1}
- 3D model (JSmol): Interactive image
- SMILES: C[N+](C)(C)CCC1=CNC2=C1C(=CC=C2)O
- InChI: InChI=1S/C13H18N2O/c1-15(2,3)8-7-10-9-14-11-5-4-6-12(16)13(10)11/h4-6,9,14H,7-8H2,1-3H3/p+1; Key:RMPOMMZKJNCOTM-UHFFFAOYSA-O

4-HO-TMT, or 4-OH-TMT, also known as 4-hydroxy-N,N,N-trimethyltryptammonium or as dephosphorylated aeruginascin, is a substituted tryptamine derivative and the active form of aeruginascin (4-PO-TMT), analogously to how psilocin (4-HO-DMT) is the active form of psilocybin (4-PO-DMT). 4-HO-TMT is closely related to bufotenidine, the N-trimethyl analogue of serotonin.

== Pharmacology ==
Like psilocin, 4-HO-TMT shows affinity for the serotonin 5-HT_{1A}, 5-HT_{2A}, and 5-HT_{2B} receptors. However, its affinities for these receptors are lower than those of psilocin (by 8-, 6-, and 26-fold, respectively). Additionally, in another study, the EC_{50} value of 4-HO-TMT in activating the serotonin 5-HT_{2A} receptor was 324-fold lower than that of psilocin (6,800 nM and 21 nM, respectively). Similarly to psilocin, 4-HO-TMT does not bind to the serotonin 5-HT_{3} receptor. This was in contrast to predictions, as the related compound bufotenidine is a strong and selective serotonin 5-HT_{3} receptor agonist.

4-HO-TMT is a quaternary trimethyl ammonium compound, and as a result, is less likely to be able to cross the blood–brain barrier (BBB) and enter the central nervous system than other tryptamines. Accordingly, 4-HO-TMT showed no ability to cross an artificial BBB-like membrane in a study. In rodents, 4-HO-TMT showed no head-twitch response (a behavioral proxy of psychedelic effects), hypolocomotion, or hypothermia, in contrast to psilocin and norpsilocin, but similarly to aeruginascin.

== Chemistry ==
=== Analogues ===
==== 4-AcO-TMT ====
A synthetic prodrug of 4-HO-TMT, 4-AcO-TMT, has been developed. It is analogous to psilacetin (4-AcO-DMT), a prodrug of psilocin.

== History ==
4-HO-TMT was found to be sold online as an analytical standard in 2023.

== See also ==
- Substituted tryptamine
- Entourage effect
