= Psilocybe ochraceocentrata =

Scientific classification
- Kingdom: Fungi
- Division: Basidiomycota
- Class: Agaricomycetes
- Order: Agaricales
- Family: Hymenogastraceae
- Genus: Psilocybe
- Species: P. ochraceocentrata

Binomial name
- Psilocybe ochraceocentrata C.Sharp, A.Bradshaw, B.Dentinger & B.van der Merwe

Species of fungus

Psilocybe ochraceocentrata is a mushroom native to Southern Africa. Some confuse it with Psilocybe natalensis, but a 2026 phylogenetic study by Bradshaw et al. established it as a distinct species, closely related to Psilocybe cubensis.
