= Psilocybin mushroom =

Mushrooms containing psychoactive indole alkaloids

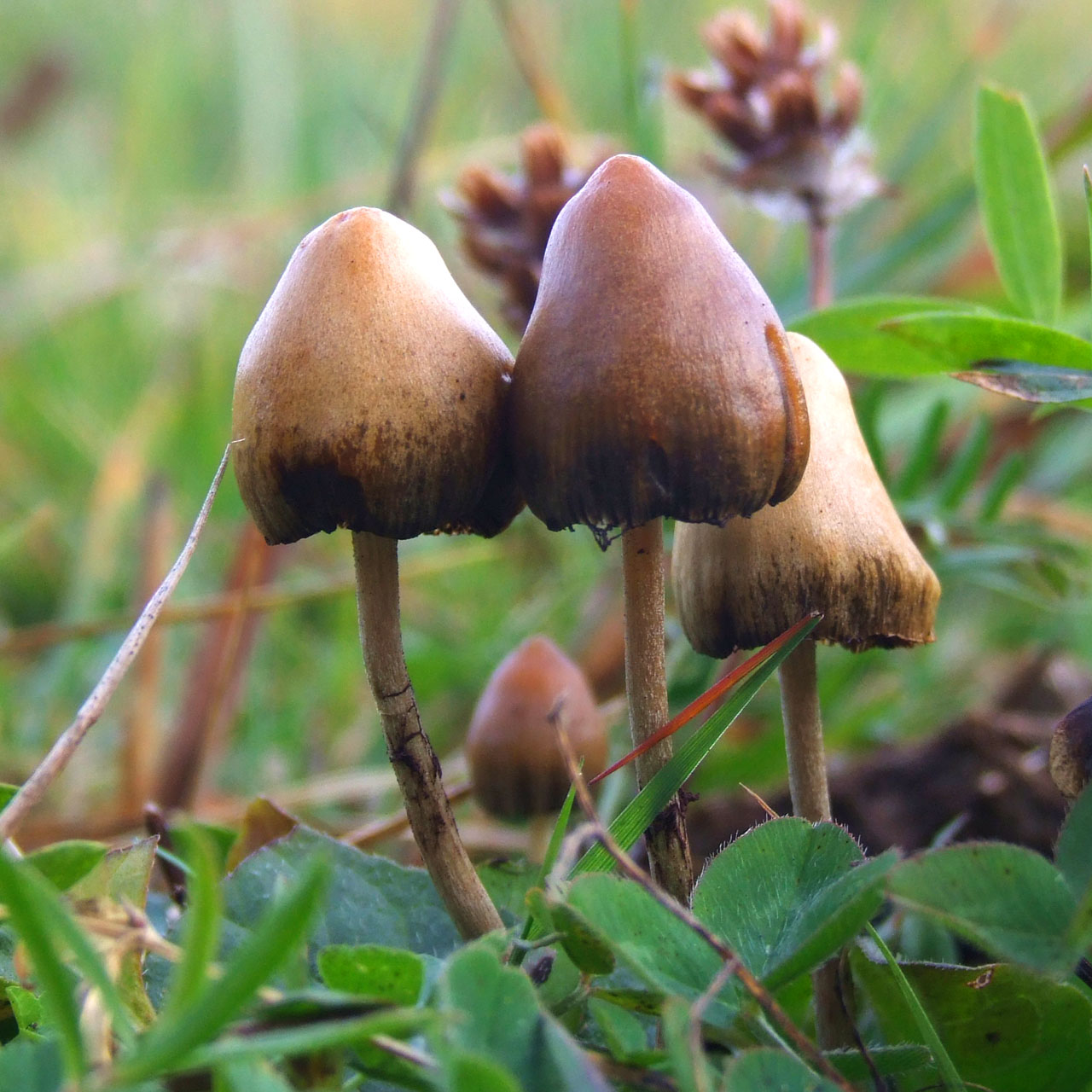
Psilocybe semilanceata

Psilocybin mushroom (Note: Also known as psilocybin-containing mushrooms, magic mushrooms, or shrooms.) is a type of hallucinogenic mushroom and a polyphyletic informal group of fungi that contain the prodrug psilocybin, which is metabolised into the psychedelic compound psilocin following ingestion. Rather than referring to one single mushroom species, the term "psilocybin mushroom" refers to a broad group of fungi found across several genera. Other compounds such as baeocystin, norbaeocystin, aeruginascin, and β-carbolines may modulate effects. The most potent species are members of genus Psilocybe, such as P. azurescens, P. semilanceata, and P. cyanescens, but psilocybin has also been isolated from approximately a dozen other genera, including Panaeolus (including Copelandia), Inocybe, Pluteus, Gymnopilus, and Pholiotina.

Amongst other cultural applications, psilocybin mushrooms are used as recreational drugs. While psilocybin mushrooms were used ritualistically in pre-Columbian Mexico for religious and divinatory purposes, their historical use elsewhere was rare and is often exaggerated. Such practices were suppressed after European colonization.

Modern Western interest began in the mid-20th century with figures like R. Gordon Wasson and Timothy Leary popularizing their study and use. Legal status varies widely, with some U.S. states decriminalizing or allowing therapeutic use, and international treaties generally regulate only the active compounds, not the mushrooms themselves. Research has increasingly focused on therapeutic potential for depression, anxiety, and substance use disorders. Recent scientific literature has also expanded interest in the taxonomy, ecology, and neurobiology of psilocybin-containing fungi, not only their psychoactive properties.

== Natural occurrence ==
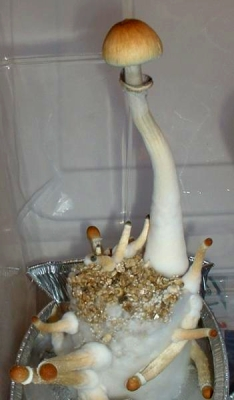
Indoor cultivation of Psilocybe cubensis

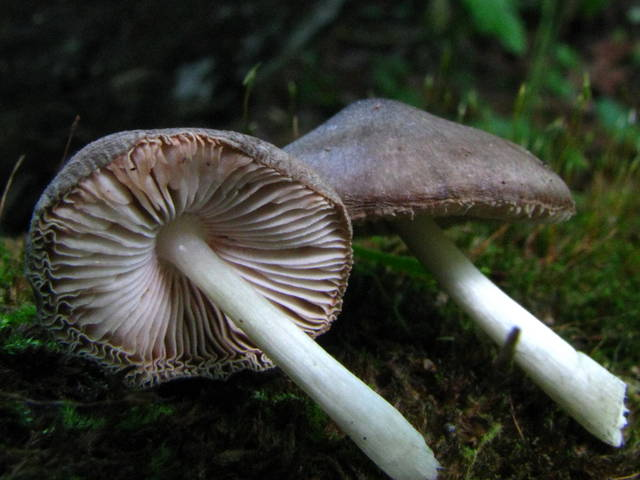
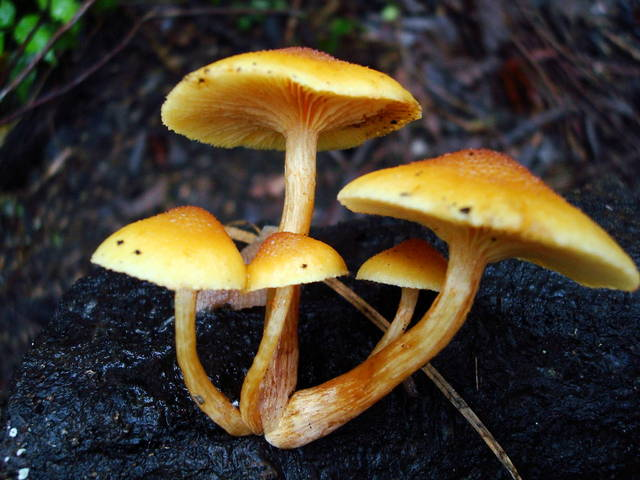
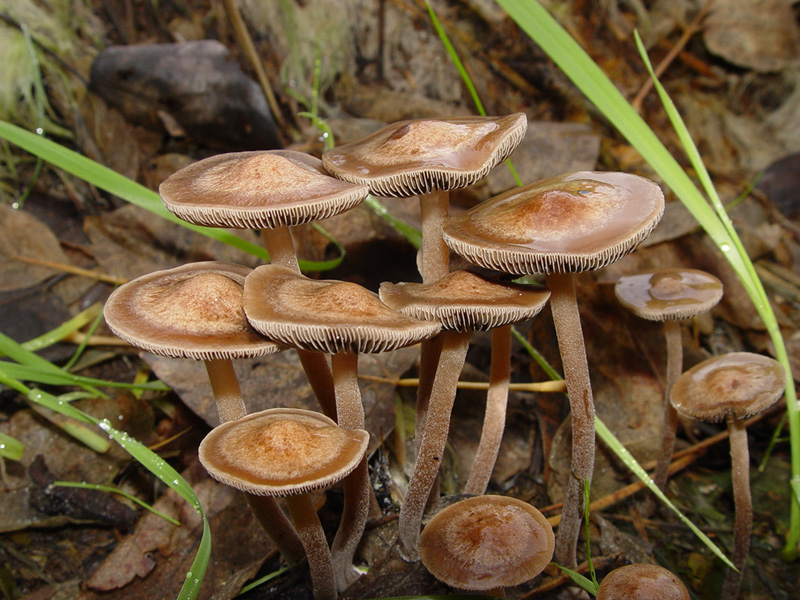
Non-Psilocybe species of psilocybin mushroom include Pluteus salicinus (left), Gymnopilus luteoviridis (center), and Panaeolus cinctulus, formerly called Panaeolus subbalteatus (right)

In a 2000 review on the worldwide distribution of psilocybin mushrooms, Gastón Guzmán and colleagues considered these distributed among the following genera: Psilocybe (116 species), Gymnopilus (14), Panaeolus (13), Copelandia (12), Pluteus (6) Inocybe (6), Pholiotina (4) and Galerina (1). Guzmán increased his estimate of the number of psilocybin-containing Psilocybe to 144 species in a 2005 review.

Global distribution of 100+ psychoactive species of genus Psilocybe mushrooms

Many of them are found in Mexico (53 species), with the remainder distributed throughout Canada and the US (22), Europe (16), Asia (15), Africa (4), and Australia and associated islands (19). Generally, psilocybin-containing species are dark-spored, gilled mushrooms that grow in meadows and woods in the subtropics and tropics, usually in soils rich in humus and plant debris. Psilocybin mushrooms occur on all continents, but the majority of species are found in subtropical humid forests. P. cubensis is the most common Psilocybe in tropical areas. P. semilanceata, considered the world's most widely distributed psilocybin mushroom, is found in temperate parts of Europe, North America, Asia, South America, Australia and New Zealand, although it is absent from Mexico. In 2023, two new Psilocybe species (Hymenogastraceae), P. ingeli and P. maluti, were described from southern Africa.

Psilocybe cubensis grows naturally in tropical and subtropical conditions, often near cattle due to the ideal conditions they provide for the growth of the fungus. The cow usually consumes grains or grass covered with the spores of P. cubensis, and the fungus will begin to germinate within the dung.

Psilocybin-containing mushrooms occupy a variety of ecological niches depending on the species and genus. Some species are commonly associated with decomposing wood, grasslands, forest soils, mossy environments, or animal dung.

Scientists also classify these fungi using both visible mushroom traits and newer DNA-based methods, which has helped improve identification and distinguish psychoactive species from similar-looking non-psychoactive or potentially toxic mushrooms.

Ecologically, these fungi are generally saprotrophs, meaning they obtain nutrients by breaking down dead organic material in their environments. This helps explain why many species are found on decaying wood, plant litter, rich soils, or dung-based substrates. Habitat also differs by genus. Species of Panaeolus are especially associated with dung-rich habitats and grasslands, while many Pluteus and Gymnopilus species are more often linked to decaying wood and woody debris. Recent phylogenomic research has also increased scientific interest in the possible ecological role of psilocybin itself. One proposed idea is that psilocybin may be involved in fungal interactions with insects, although researchers have also noted that direct empirical evidence for this remains limited. Geographic records are still incomplete in many regions, and recent studies have emphasized that global biodiversity data for psychedelic fungi remain uneven. This means the currently documented distribution of psilocybin-containing mushrooms may still underestimate their full ecological range.

== Composition ==
Active psilocybin mushroom constituents
| Phosphorylated | Dephosphorylated | HTR? |
|---|---|---|
| Norbaeocystin (4-PO-T) | 4-Hydroxytryptamine (4-HT) | No |
| Baeocystin (4-PO-NMT) | Norpsilocin (4-HO-NMT) | No |
| Psilocybin (4-PO-DMT) | Psilocin (4-HO-DMT) | Yes |
| Aeruginascin (4-PO-TMT) | 4-HO-TMT | No |
Notes: (1) The phosphorylated constituents are or are thought to be prodrugs of the dephosphorylated constituents. (2) The head-twitch response (HTR) is a behavioral proxy of psychedelic-like effects in rodents. Refs:

Psilocybin-containing mushroom composition varies from genus to genus and from species to species. The principal component is psilocybin, which is converted into psilocin to produce psychoactive effects. Besides psilocin, norpsilocin, baeocystin, norbaeocystin, and aeruginascin may also be present, which might result in an entourage effect and modify the effects of magic mushrooms. Animal studies suggest that the effects of pure psilocybin or psilocin and psilocybin mushrooms may be different and support the possibility of such an entourage effect with psilocybin mushrooms. The phosphorylated and non-phosphorylated 4-hydroxytryptamines present in psilocybin-containing mushrooms are collectively known as psiloids. Panaeolus subbalteatus, one species of magic mushroom, had the highest amount of psilocybin compared to the rest of the fruiting body.

Certain mushrooms are found to produce β-carbolines, such as harmine, harmane, tetrahydroharmine (THH), and harmaline, which inhibit monoamine oxidase (MAO), an enzyme that breaks down tryptamine alkaloids, and have other actions. They occur in different genera, such as Psilocybe, Cyclocybe, and Hygrophorus. Harmine, harmane, norharmane, and a range of other β-carbolines were discovered in Psilocybe species. β-Carbolines in psilocybin mushrooms may inhibit the metabolism of psilocybin and other constituents and thereby potentiate their effects.

== Uses ==
Psilocybin-containing mushrooms may be used in whole form, for example consumption of dried or fresh mushrooms, or may be turned into extracts or food products such as mushroom edibles or mushroom tea. Psilocybin-containing mushrooms and products, as well as products containing related compounds like 4-AcO-DMT, may be purchased at smart shops like psychedelic mushroom stores in some jurisdictions. Another related psilocybin-containing fungus is magic truffles, which are not technically mushrooms themselves but are the sclerotia or mycelium of psilocybin-containing mushrooms.

=== Dosing ===
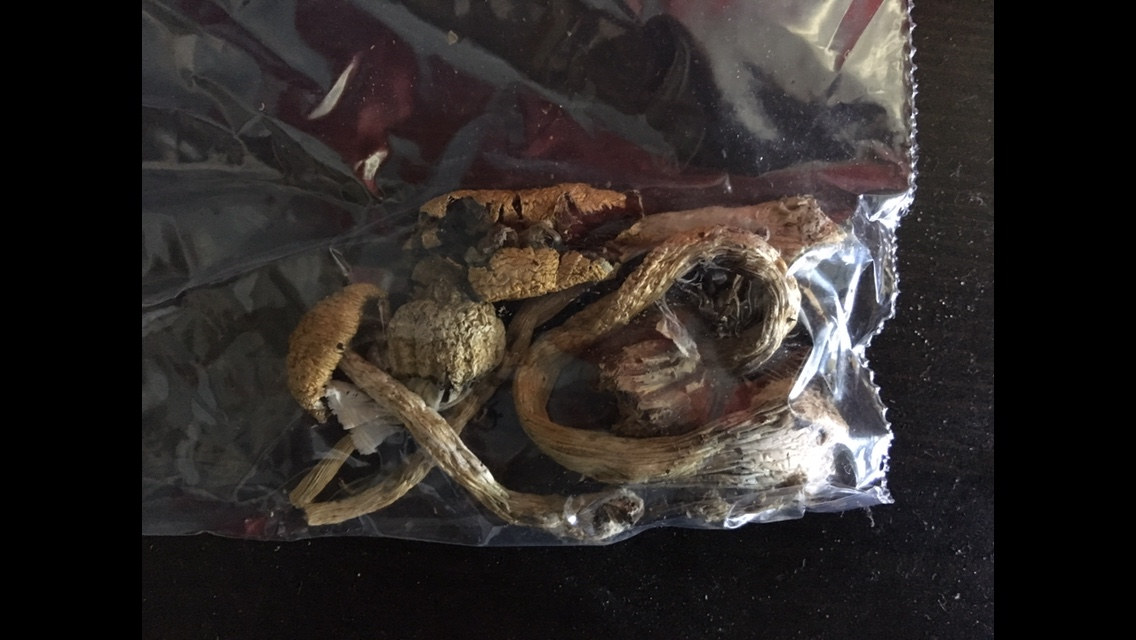
A bag of 1.5 grams of dried psilocybe cubensis mushrooms

The dose of psilocybin-containing mushrooms depends on the psilocybin and psilocin content, which can vary significantly between and within the same species. Psilocybin content is typically around 0.5% to 1% of the dried weight of the mushroom, with a range of 0.03% to 1.78%. Psilocin is also often present in the mushrooms, with a range of 0% to 0.59%, and can be on par with or an order of magnitude lower than psilocybin levels. Psilocybe cubensis, the most popular species, has been reported to contain 0.63% psilocybin and 0.6% psilocin, or about 1.2% of psilocybin and psilocin combined. However, there is significant variation in different P. cubensis strains. The 'Penis Envy' strain of P. cubensis is considered to be more potent than other strains. Psilocybin levels appear to be highest in P. cyanescens and/or P. azurescens.

Recreational doses of psilocybin mushrooms are typically between 1.0–5.0 g of dry mushrooms and 10 to 50 g of fresh mushrooms. This corresponds to a dose of psilocybin of about 10 to 50 mg. Usual doses of the common species P. cubensis range around 1.0 to 2.5 g, while about 2.5 to 5.0 g dried mushroom material is considered a strong dose and above 5.0 g is considered a heavy dose. A 5.0 g dose of dried mushroom is often referred to as a "heroic dose". In terms of psilocybin dosing, subthreshold or microdoses are <2.5 mg, low doses are 5 to 10 mg, the intermediate or "good effect" dose is 20 mg, and high or ego-dissolution doses are 30 to 40 mg. A 20 mg dose of psilocybin is equivalent to about 100 μg LSD or about 500 mg mescaline. With regard to psilocybin and psilocin equivalence, psilocin is about 1.4-fold more potent than psilocybin (i.e., 1.4 mg psilocybin equals about 1.0 mg psilocin), which is the same difference as the molecular weights of the two compounds.

Microdosing has become a popular technique for many users, which involves taking <1.0 g of dried mushrooms for an experience that is not as intense or powerful, but recreationally enjoyable, or fully non-hallucinogenic, and potentially alleviating for symptoms of depression. A microdose of psilocybin mushrooms is about 10% of a recreational dose, and may be 0.1 to 0.3 g of dry mushrooms, taken up to three times per week.

"Lemon tek" or "lemon tekking" is a method sometimes used by recreational psilocybin users. It involves soaking psilocybin-containing mushrooms in citric acid-containing lemon juice to supposedly convert their psilocybin content into psilocin prior to administration. This is claimed to hasten their onset, cause a sharper and more intense peak, and shorten their duration.

== Effects ==
Table from the 2010 DrugScience study ranking various drugs (legal and illegal) based on statements by drug-harm experts. This study rated "mushrooms" the least harmful drug overall and for users, and the only drug that did not get any scores for harm on others.

The effects of psilocybin mushrooms come from psilocybin and psilocin. When psilocybin is ingested, it is broken down by the liver in a process called dephosphorylation. The resulting compound is called psilocin, responsible for the psychedelic effects. Psilocybin and psilocin create short-term increases in tolerance of users, thus making it difficult to misuse them because the more often they are taken within a short period, the weaker the resultant effects are. Psilocybin mushrooms have not been known to cause physical or psychological dependence (addiction). The psychedelic effects appear around 20 minutes after ingestion and can last up to 6 hours. Physical effects may occur, including nausea, vomiting, euphoria, muscle weakness or relaxation, drowsiness, and lack of coordination.

As with many psychedelic substances, the effects of psychedelic mushrooms are subjective and can vary considerably among individual users. The mind-altering effects of psilocybin-containing mushrooms typically last from three to eight hours, depending on dose, preparation method, and personal metabolism. The first 3–4 hours after ingestion are typically referred to as the 'peak'—in which the user experiences more vivid visuals and distortions in reality. The effects can seem to last much longer for the user because of psilocybin's ability to alter time perception.

=== Sensory effects ===
Sensory effects include visual and auditory hallucinations followed by emotional changes and altered perception of time and space. Noticeable changes to the auditory, visual, and tactile senses may become apparent around 30 minutes to an hour after ingestion, although effects may take up to two hours to take place. These shifts in perception visually include enhancement and contrasting of colors, strange light phenomena (such as auras or "halos" around light sources), increased visual acuity, surfaces that seem to ripple, shimmer, or breathe; complex open and closed eye visuals of form constants or images, objects that warp, morph, or change solid colors; a sense of melting into the environment, and trails behind moving objects. Sounds may seem to have increased clarity—music, for example, can take on a profound sense of cadence and depth. Some users experience synesthesia, wherein they perceive, for example, a visualization of color upon hearing a particular sound.

=== Emotional effects ===
As with other psychedelics such as LSD, the experience, or 'trip,' is strongly dependent upon set and setting. Hilarity, lack of concentration, and muscular relaxation (including dilated pupils) are all normal effects, sometimes in the same trip. A negative environment could contribute to a bad trip, whereas a comfortable and familiar environment would set the stage for a pleasant experience. Psychedelics make experiences more intense, so if a person enters a trip in an anxious state of mind, they will likely experience heightened anxiety on their trip. Many users find it preferable to ingest the mushrooms with friends or people familiar with 'tripping.' The psychological consequences of psilocybin use include hallucinations and an inability to discern fantasy from reality. Panic reactions and psychosis also may occur, particularly if a user ingests a large dose.

Recent research has also increased interest in the possible therapeutic effects of psilocybin in controlled settings, especially for depression, anxiety, and substance use disorders, though current findings are still being studied and should be interpreted carefully.

== Toxicity ==
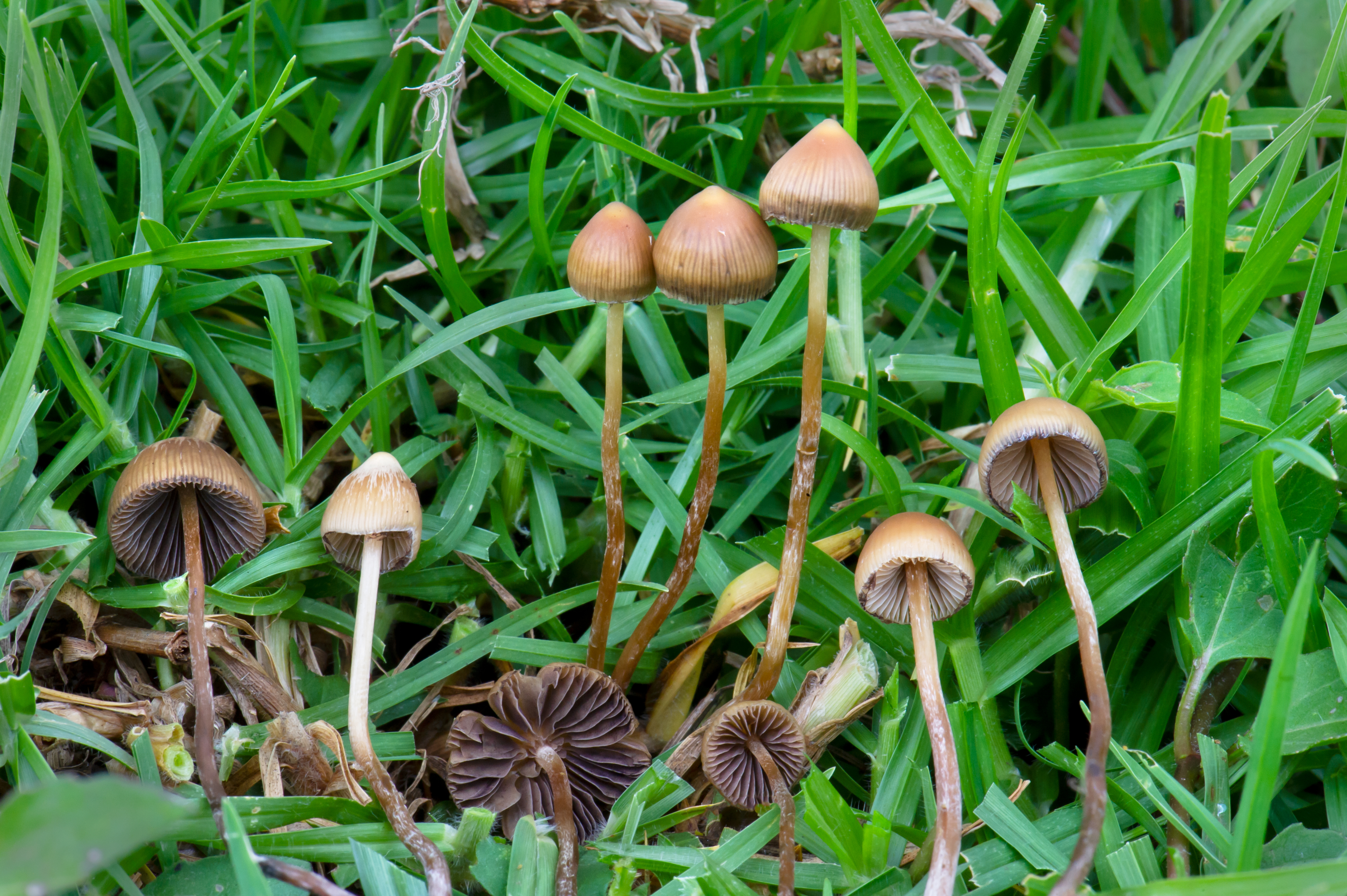
Psilocybe mexicana

The species within the most commonly foraged and ingested genus of psilocybin mushrooms, the psilocybe, contains two primary hallucinogenic toxins; psilocybin and psilocin. The median lethal dose, also known as "LD50", of psilocybin is 280 mg/kg.

From a toxicological profile, it would be incredibly difficult to overdose on psilocybin mushrooms, given their primary toxin compounds. To consume such massive amounts of psilocybin, one must ingest more than 1.2 kg of dried Psilocybe cubensis given 1-2% of the dried mushroom contains psilocybin.

Posing a more realistic threat than a lethal overdose, significantly elevated levels of psilocin can overstimulate the 5-HT2A receptors in the brain, causing acute serotonin syndrome. A 2015 study observed that a dose of 200 mg/kg psilocin induced symptoms of acute serotonin poisoning in mice.

Neurotoxicity-induced fatal events are uncommon with psilocybin mushroom overdose, as most patients admitted to critical care are released from the department only requiring moderate treatment. However, fatal events related to emotional distress and trip-induced psychosis can occur as a result of over-consumption of psilocybin mushrooms. In 2003, a 27-year-old man was found dead in an irrigation canal due to hypothermia. In his bedroom was found two cultivation pots of psilocybin mushrooms, but no report of toxicology was made.

A more common public health concern than overdose is accidental misidentification, since some psychoactive mushroom species can resemble non-psychoactive or toxic mushrooms. A 2026 study found that the species Galerina indica produces both psiloid compounds and toxins, a combination previously thought not to be possible.

== History ==
=== Early ===
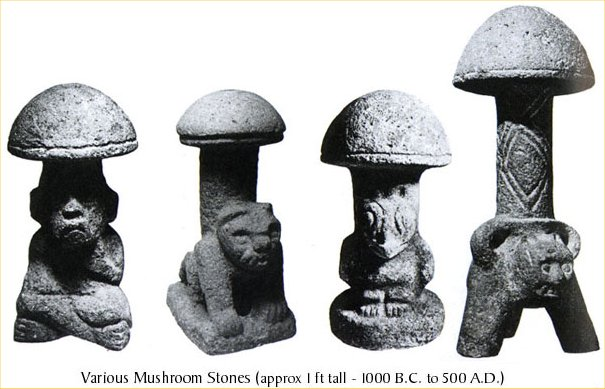
Pre-Columbian mushroom stones

The use of psilocybin mushrooms by humans in religious ceremonies dating back thousands of years is contested. Despite popular narratives portraying psychedelics as ancient, widespread, and primarily used by shamans for therapeutic healing, careful anthropological and historical research shows their traditional use was limited, recent, and culturally specific, with modern Western interpretations largely shaped by idealization, tourism, and ideological agendas. Reliable evidence shows that psilocybin mushrooms were used ritualistically in pre-Columbian Mexico but were otherwise rare, with most claims of ancient widespread use being exaggerated or misinterpreted.

The Tassili Mushroom Figure was discovered in Tassili, Algeria has been argued to provide evidence of an early psilocybin-containing mushroom cult. 6,000-year-old pictographs discovered near the Spanish town of Villar del Humo illustrate several mushrooms that have been argued to be Psilocybe hispanica, a hallucinogenic species native to the area. Some scholars have also interpreted archaeological artifacts from Mexico and the so-called Mayan "mushroom stones" of Guatemala as evidence of ritual and ceremonial use of psychoactive mushrooms in the Mayan and Aztec cultures of Mesoamerica.

The hallucinogenic species of the Psilocybe genus have a history of use among the native peoples of Mesoamerica for religious communion, divination, and healing, from pre-Columbian times to the present day. Aztecs and Mazatecs referred to psilocybin mushrooms by phrases that translate to genius mushrooms, divinatory mushrooms, and wondrous mushrooms. Bernardino de Sahagún reported the ritualistic use of teonanácatl by the Aztecs when he traveled to Central America after the expedition of Hernán Cortés.

After the Spanish conquest, Catholic missionaries campaigned against the cultural tradition of the Aztecs, dismissing the Aztecs as idolaters, and the use of hallucinogenic plants and mushrooms, together with other pre-Christian traditions, was quickly suppressed. The Spanish believed the mushroom allowed the Aztecs and others to communicate with demons. Despite this history, the use of teonanácatl has persisted in some remote areas.

A 2024 research paper identified Psilocybe maluti as a new described species from the Free State Province of South Africa and Lesotho in Southern Africa. Anecdotal reports suggests the mushroom was used spiritually and traditionally by Basotho healers, marking it the only documented instance of traditional hallucinogenic mushroom use in Africa and the earliest recorded reference to such practices in Sub-Saharan Africa.

=== Modern ===
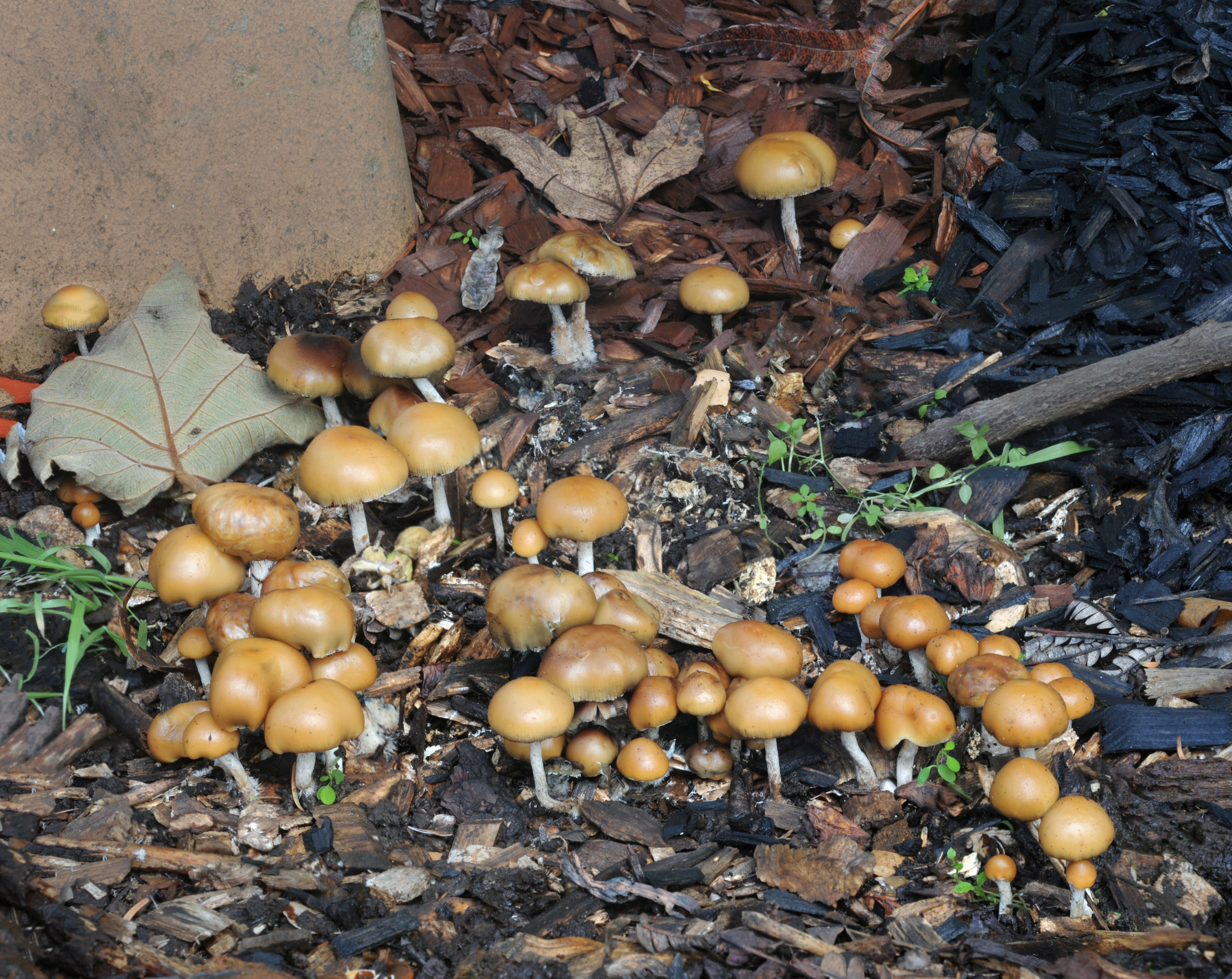
Psilocybe allenii

The first mention of hallucinogenic mushrooms in European medicinal literature was in the London Medical and Physical Journal in 1799. A man served Psilocybe semilanceata mushrooms he had picked for breakfast in London's Green Park to his family. The apothecary who treated them later described how the youngest child "was attacked with fits of immoderate laughter, nor could the threats of his father or mother refrain him."

In 1955, Valentina Pavlovna Wasson and R. Gordon Wasson became the first known European Americans to actively participate in an indigenous mushroom ceremony. The Wassons did much to publicize their experience, even publishing an article on their experiences in Life on May 13, 1957. In 1956, Roger Heim identified the psychoactive mushroom the Wassons brought back from Mexico as Psilocybe, and in 1958, Albert Hofmann first identified psilocybin and psilocin as the active compounds in these mushrooms. The isolation of psilocybin was the culmination of a broader research effort that involved Indigenous collaborators, anthropologists, mycologists, universities, pharmaceutical laboratories, and intelligence-linked funding during the Cold War.

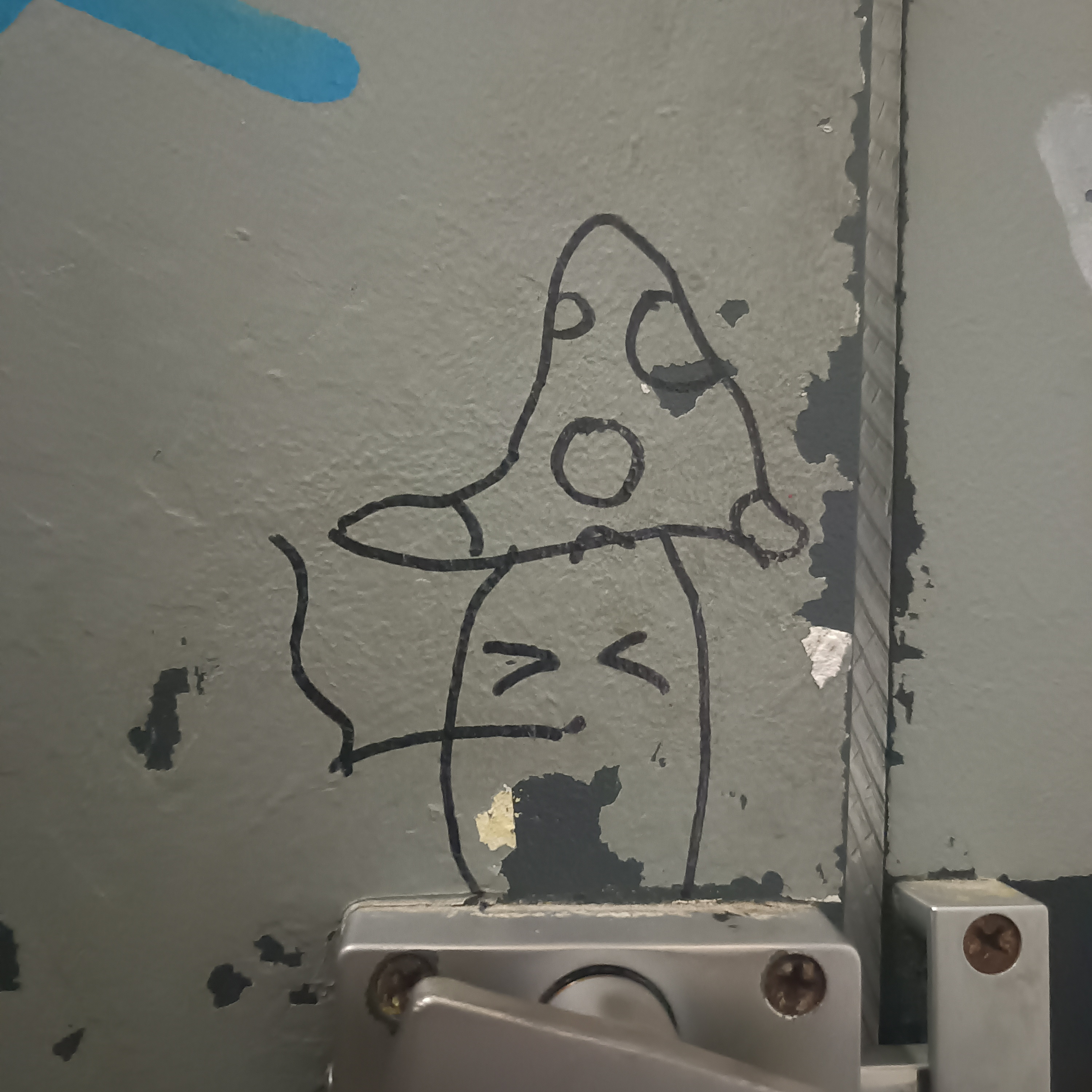
Sticker art and Latrinalia related to the culture of Psilocybin mushrooms, Sydney, 2025

Inspired by the Wassons' Life article, Timothy Leary traveled to Mexico to experience psilocybin mushrooms himself. When he returned to Harvard in 1960, he and Richard Alpert started the Harvard Psilocybin Project, promoting psychological and religious studies of psilocybin and other psychedelic drugs. Alpert and Leary sought to conduct research with psilocybin on prisoners in the 1960s, testing its effects on recidivism. This experiment reviewed the subjects six months later, and found that the recidivism rate had decreased beyond their expectation, below 40%. This, and another experiment administering psilocybin to graduate divinity students, showed controversy. Shortly after Leary and Alpert were dismissed from their jobs by Harvard in 1963, they turned their attention toward promoting the psychedelic experience to the nascent hippie counterculture.

The popularization of entheogens by the Wassons, Leary, Terence McKenna, Robert Anton Wilson, and many others led to an explosion in the use of psilocybin mushrooms throughout the world. By the early 1970s, many psilocybin mushroom species were described from temperate North America, Europe, and Asia and were widely collected. Books describing methods of cultivating large quantities of Psilocybe cubensis were also published, for instance Psilocybin: Magic Mushroom Grower's Guide (1976) by Terence McKenna and Dennis McKenna. The availability of psilocybin mushrooms from wild and cultivated sources has made them one of the most widely used psychedelic drugs.

At present, psilocybin mushroom use has been reported among some groups spanning from central Mexico to Oaxaca, including groups of Nahua, Mixtecs, Mixe, Mazatecs, Zapotecs, and others. Psilocybin retreats such as MycoMeditations also exist in countries like Jamaica, where psilocybin mushrooms are legal. An important figure of mushroom usage in Mexico was María Sabina, who used native mushrooms, such as Psilocybe mexicana in her practice.

Modern scientific and cultural interest in psilocybin mushrooms has continued to grow, especially because of renewed psychiatric and neuroscientific research in the 21st century.

== Society and culture ==
=== Legal status ===
The legality of the cultivation, possession, and sale of psilocybin mushrooms and psilocybin and psilocin varies from country to country.

After Oregon Measure 109, in 2020, Oregon became the first US state to decriminalize psilocybin and legalize it for therapeutic use. However, selling psilocybin without being licensed may still attract fines or imprisonment. In 2022 Colorado legalized consumption, growing, and sharing for personal use, though sales are prohibited while regulations are being drafted. Other jurisdictions in the United States have decriminalized psilocybin mushrooms.

Furthermore, buying spores of mushroom species containing psilocybin online in the United States is legal in all states except Georgia, Idaho and California. This is because only fruiting mushrooms and mycelium contain psilocybin, a federally banned substance. A technical caveat to consider, however, is that the distributed spores must not be intended to be used for cultivation, but allowed for microscopy purposes.

==== United Nations ====
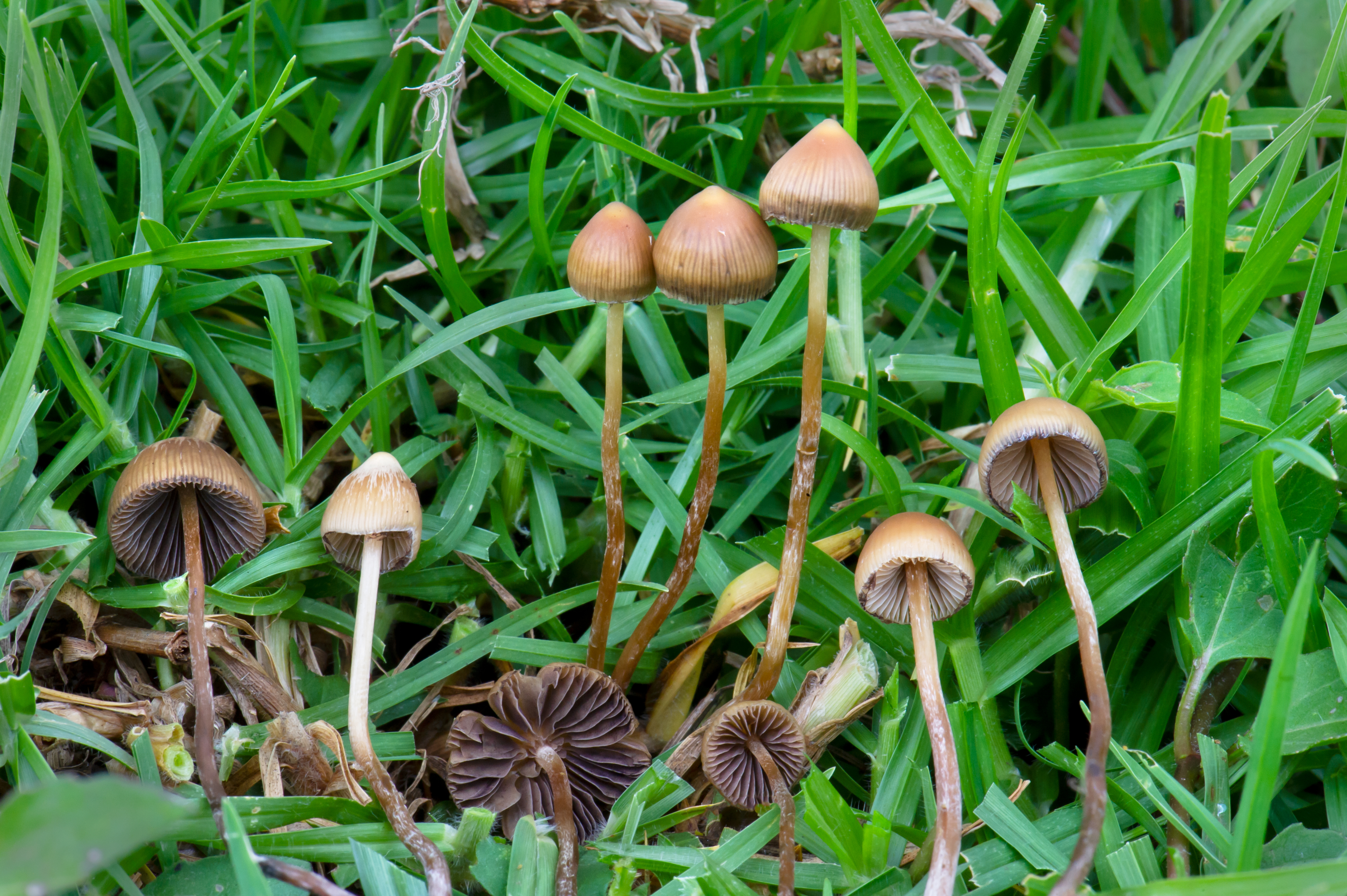
Article 32 makes an exception for psilocybin mushroom and other wild psychotropic plants, to protect use in religious rituals in case such plants themselves were in the future added to Schedule I.

Internationally, mescaline, dimethyltryptamine (DMT), and psilocin, are Schedule I drugs under the Convention on Psychotropic Substances. The Commentary on the Convention on Psychotropic Substances notes, however, that the plants containing them are not subject to international control:

The cultivation of plants from which psychotropic substances are obtained is not controlled by the Vienna Convention... Neither the crown (fruit, mescal button) of the Peyote cactus nor the roots of the plant Mimosa hostilis nor Psilocybe mushrooms themselves are included in Schedule 1, but only their respective principals, mescaline, DMT, and psilocin.

== Research ==
Due partly to restrictions of the Controlled Substances Act, research in the United States was limited until the early 21st century when psilocybin mushrooms were tested for their potential to treat drug dependence, anxiety and mood disorders. In 2018–19, the Food and Drug Administration (FDA) granted Breakthrough Therapy Designation for studies of psilocybin in depressive disorders.

More recent review articles have expanded scientific interest in psilocybin-related research, especially in psychiatry, neuroscience, and psychopharmacology. Researchers have focused on possible applications involving depression, anxiety, and substance use disorders, while also emphasizing the need for continued controlled study.

== See also ==
- Amanita § Psychoactive species
- Head-twitch response § Modulators of the head-twitch response
- List of psychedelic drugs
- List of psychoactive plants, fungi, and animals
- List of psychoactive substances derived from artificial fungi biotransformation
- Psilocybin therapy – Experimental use of psilocybin to treat anxiety & depression
- Stoned ape theory – Theory of cognitive development in early humans
- The Encyclopedia of Psychoactive Plants
- Trip killer § Serotonergic psychedelic antidotes
