= Trimethyl ammonium compounds =

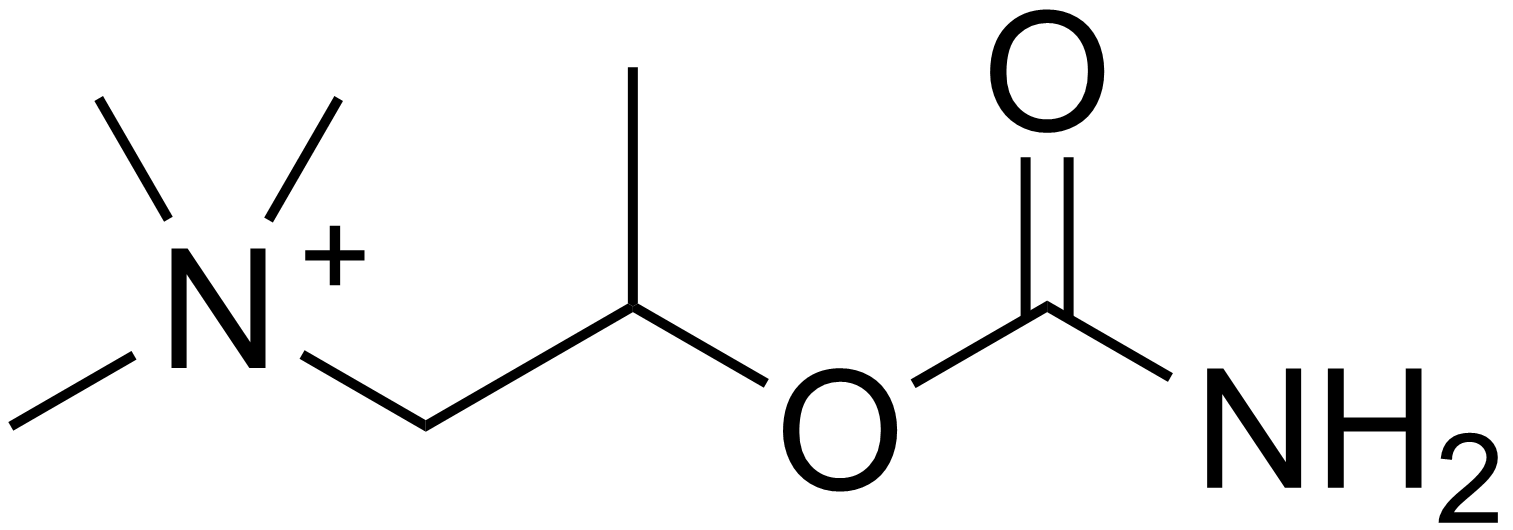
Bethanechol

Muscarine

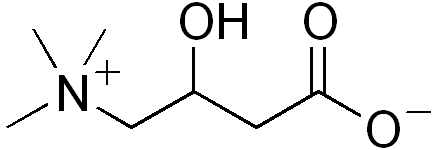
Carnitine

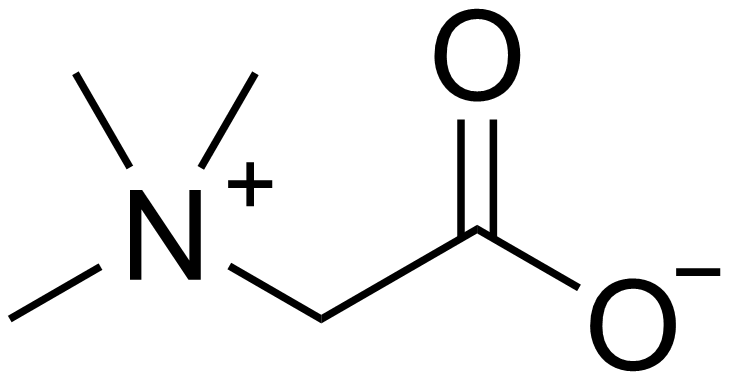
Trimethylglycine

Trimethyl ammonium compounds are a type of quaternary ammonium compound with three methyl groups at the nitrogen, with a more complicated carbon chain derivative at the fourth position.

Examples include:

- Betaine
- Bethanechol
- Carnitine and its derivatives
- Choline and its derivatives
- Methacholine
- Muscarine
- Trimethylglycine
- Benzyltrimethylammonium
