= Aeruginascin =

Chemical compound

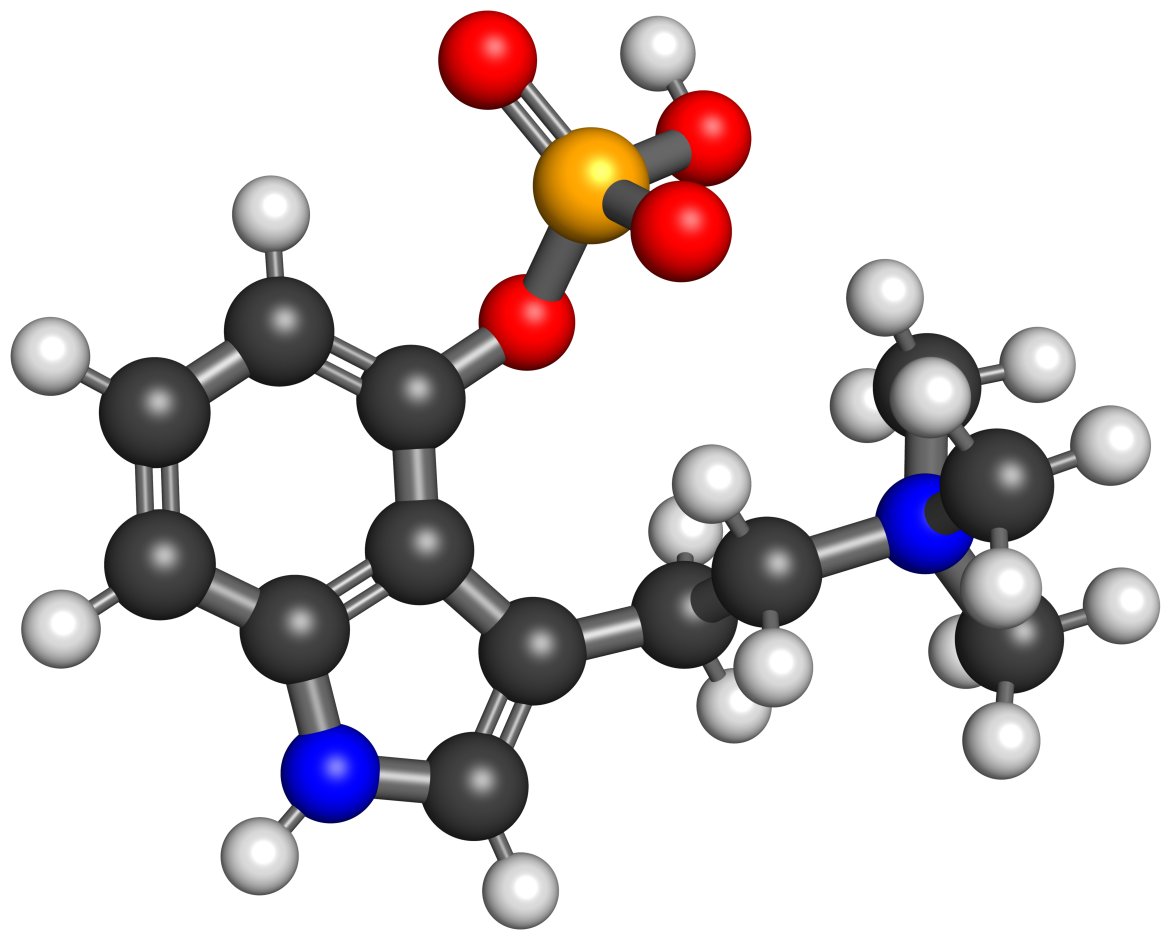

Clinical data
- Other names: 4-Phosphoryloxy-N,N,N-trimethyltryptamine; 4-PO-TMT; 4-PO-N,N,N-TMT; 4-Hydroxy-N,N,N-trimethyltryptamine 4-phosphate
- ATC code: None

Legal status
- Legal status: DE: NpSG (Industrial and scientific use only); UK: Class A

Identifiers
- IUPAC name: [3-[2-(Trimethylazaniumyl)ethyl]-1H-indol-4-yl] hydrogen phosphate
- CAS Number: 114264-95-8
- PubChem CID: 60208479
- ChemSpider: 26233970
- UNII: 7U9WQY1P7R
- CompTox Dashboard (EPA): DTXSID60921308

Chemical and physical data
- Formula: C_{13}H_{20}N_{2}O_{4}P
- Molar mass: 299.287 g·mol^{−1}
- 3D model (JSmol): Interactive image
- SMILES: C[N+](C)(C)CCc1c[nH]c2c1c(ccc2)OP(=O)(O)[O-]
- InChI: InChI=1S/C13H19N2O4P/c1-15(2,3)8-7-10-9-14-11-5-4-6-12(13(10)11)19-20(16,17)18/h4-6,9,14H,7-8H2,1-3H3,(H-,16,17,18); Key:OIIPFLWAQQNCHA-UHFFFAOYSA-N

Aeruginascin, also known as 4-phosphoryloxy-N,N,N-trimethyltryptamine (4-PO-TMT), is a substituted tryptamine alkaloid which occurs naturally within the mushrooms Inocybe aeruginascens, Pholiotina cyanopus, and Psilocybe cubensis. It was discovered by Jochen Gartz.

== Use and effects ==
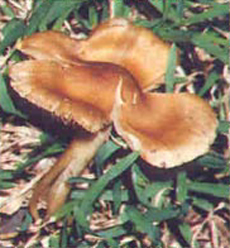
Inocybe aeruginascens.

The first report about the possible effects of aeruginascin is from a study published by Jochen Gartz in 1989. Across 23 analyzed cases of accidental hallucinogenic mushroom poisonings, people who had ingested the mushroom Inocybe aeruginascens reported only euphoric experiences. This is in contrast to the slight and in some cases extremely dysphoric experiences reported from the accidental ingestion of non-aeruginascin-containing mushrooms (containing solely psilocybin and psilocin). However, these findings are anecdotal and preliminary.

== Pharmacology ==
Aeruginascin is the N-trimethyl analogue of psilocybin. It is closely related to the frog skin toxin bufotenidine (5-HTQ), a potent serotonin 5-HT_{3} receptor agonist, but the aeruginascin metabolite 4-HO-TMT (thought to be its active form) shows strong binding at the serotonin 5-HT_{2} receptors similar to psilocin. Unlike psilocybin, but similarly to 4-HO-TMT, aeruginascin does not produce the head-twitch response in rodents. It lacks affinity or activation of the mouse 5-HT_{2A} and 5-HT_{1A} receptors.

== Chemistry ==
=== Analogues ===
Analogues of aerguinascin include 4-HO-TMT, norbaeocystin (4-PO-T), 4-hydroxytryptamine (4-HT or 4-HO-T), baeocystin (4-PO-NMT), norpsilocin (4-HO-NMT), psilocybin (4-PO-DMT), psilocin (4-HO-DMT), and ethocybin (4-PO-DET), among others.

== See also ==
- Substituted tryptamine
