= Baeocystin =

Chemical compound

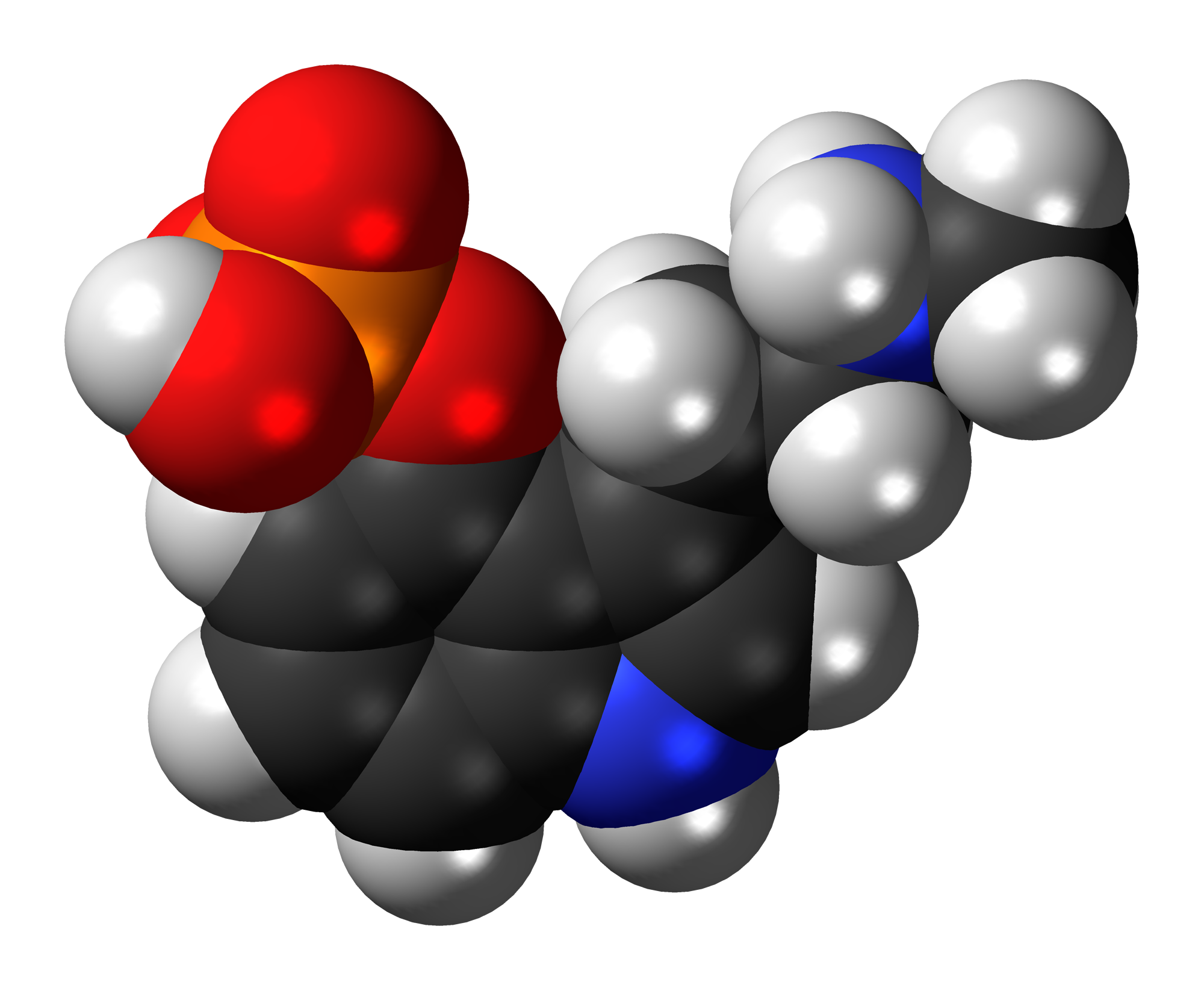

Clinical data
- Other names: Norpsilocybin; N-Desmethylpsilocybin; 4-Phosphoryloxy-N-methyltryptamine; 4-PO-NMT; 4-Hydroxy-N-methyltryptamine 4-phosphate; PLZ-1019; PLZ1019
- Routes of administration: Oral
- Drug class: Serotonin receptor agonist; Serotonin 5-HT_{2A} receptor agonist
- ATC code: None

Legal status
- Legal status: UK: Class A

Identifiers
- IUPAC name: 3-[2-(Methylammonio)ethyl]-1H-indol-4-yl hydrogenphosphate
- CAS Number: 21420-58-6
- PubChem CID: 161359
- ChemSpider: 141741
- UNII: 22KW205WF2
- ChEBI: CHEBI:139505
- CompTox Dashboard (EPA): DTXSID70175693

Chemical and physical data
- Formula: C_{11}H_{15}N_{2}O_{4}P
- Molar mass: 270.225 g·mol^{−1}
- 3D model (JSmol): Interactive image
- SMILES: CNCCc1c[nH]c2cccc(OP(=O)(O)O)c12
- InChI: InChI=1S/C11H15N2O4P/c1-12-6-5-8-7-13-9-3-2-4-10(11(8)9)17-18(14,15)16/h2-4,7,12-13H,5-6H2,1H3,(H2,14,15,16); Key:WTPBXXCVZZZXKR-UHFFFAOYSA-N

Baeocystin, also known as norpsilocybin or 4-phosphoryloxy-N-methyltryptamine (4-PO-NMT), is a zwitterionic alkaloid of the tryptamine family and an analogue of psilocybin (4-PO-DMT). It is found as a minor compound in most psilocybin mushrooms together with psilocybin, psilocin (4-HO-DMT), norbaeocystin (4-PO-T), and aeruginascin (4-PO-TMT). The compound is the N-demethylated derivative of psilocybin and the 4-phosphorylated derivative of norpsilocin (4-HO-NMT).

== Use and effects ==
Chemist and mycologist Jochen Gartz reported in the 1990s that baeocystin is active as a psychedelic in humans. He has stated that 4 mg produced a "threshold" or "gentle hallucinogenic experience" with "mild hallucinations for three hours" and that "10 mg of baeocystin [was] found to be about as psychoactive as a similar amount of psilocybin". Gartz also personally communicated these findings to Jonathan Ott, who has reproduced the claims. Hamilton Morris has expressed surprise and skepticism about the reported psychoactivity of baeocystin however.

Gartz has also claimed that mushrooms with high baeocystin content, such as Psilocybe semilanceata, are more frequently associated with dysphoric experiences. Conversely, he has claimed that accidental ingestion of Inocybe aeruginascens, which contains high levels of both aeruginascin (4-PO-TMT) and baeocystin, is usually associated with euphoric experiences, in contrast to the dysphoric experiences that can occur with mushrooms containing only high levels of psilocybin. However, more research is needed on the effects of baeocystin and aeruginascin in humans.

In contrast to Gartz, mycologist Paul Stamets has reported that he tried 10 mg pure baeocystin and that it didn't produce hallucinogenic effects, but did produce pupil dilation and apparent anxiolysis.

== Pharmacology ==
Baeocystin is thought to be a prodrug of norpsilocin, analogously to how psilocybin is a prodrug of psilocin. Norpsilocin is a potent and centrally penetrant agonist of the serotonin 5-HT_{2A} receptor and also interacts with other serotonin receptors.

Baeocystin and norpsilocin have been found to be inactive in terms of hallucinogen-like effects in rodents in multiple studies published in the 2020s. More specifically, they were unable to produce the head-twitch response (HTR), a well-established behavioral proxy of psychedelic effects, and this was in contrast to psilocybin. In one of the papers, the researchers concluded that "...baeocystin alone would likely not induce hallucinogenic effects in vivo". As with baeocystin and norpsilocin, norbaeocystin, aeruginascin, 4-hydroxytryptamine (4-HT), and 4-HO-TMT also all failed to induce the HTR in rodents. However, these compounds have not necessarily been inactive in terms of behavioral effects in general.

The reasons for the apparently non-hallucinogenic nature of norpsilocin, baeocystin, and related compounds in animals (and possibly in humans), in spite of norpsilocin and others being potent serotonin 5-HT_{2A} receptor agonists and producing other centrally mediated behavioral effects in animals, remain unknown. One possibility however is that these compounds may be biased agonists of the serotonin 5-HT_{2A} receptor and may not sufficiently activate the intracellular signaling cascades responsible for psychedelic effects. On the other hand, a 2025 animal study found that both baeocystin and norpsilocin are peripherally selective with very limited ability to cross the blood–brain barrier.

== Chemistry ==
=== Analogues ===
Analogues of baeocystin include 4-HO-NMT, norbaeocystin (4-PO-T), psilocybin (4-PO-DMT), psilocin (4-HO-DMT), ethocybin (4-PO-DET), and aeruginascin (4-PO-TMT), among others.

== Natural occurrence ==
Baeocystin was first isolated from the mushroom Psilocybe baeocystis, and later from P. semilanceata, Panaeolus renenosus, Panaeolus subbalteatus, and Copelandia chlorocystis.

== History ==
Baeocystin was first synthesized by Troxler and colleagues in 1959.

== Research ==
Baeocystin is being evaluated by Pilz Bioscience ("pilz" being German for "mushroom") under the developmental code name PLZ-1019 for the possible treatment of pervasive developmental disorder and autism spectrum disorder in children.

== See also ==
- Substituted tryptamine
- List of investigational hallucinogens and entactogens
