= Norbaeocystin =

Chemical compound

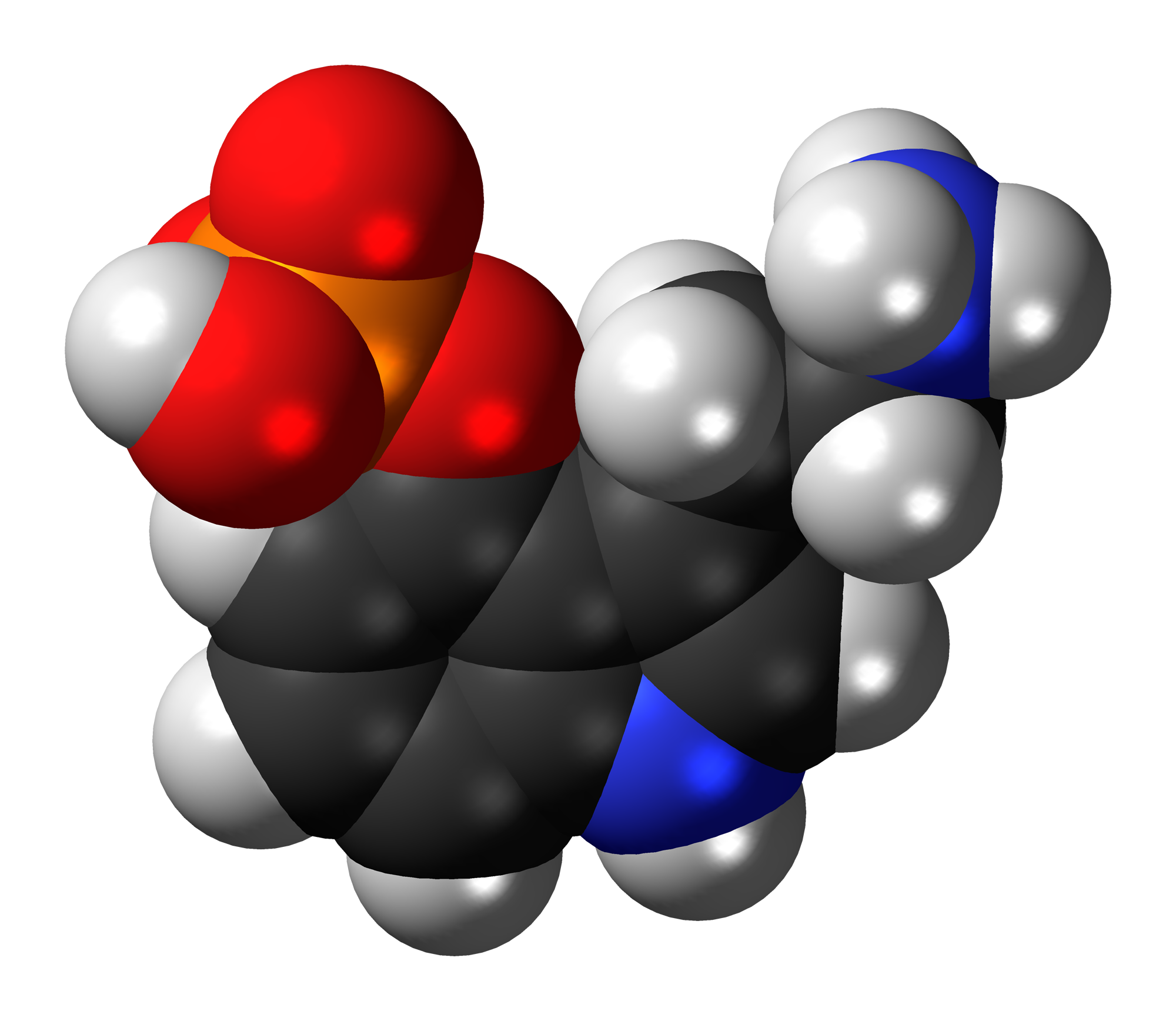

Clinical data
- Other names: 4-Phosphoryloxytryptamine; 4-PO-T; 4-Hydroxytryptamine 4-phosphate; 4-Hydroxytryptamine phosphate
- Routes of administration: Oral
- Drug class: Serotonin receptor agonist; Non-hallucinogenic serotonin 5-HT_{2A} receptor agonist
- ATC code: None

Legal status
- Legal status: US: Schedule I by analogue

Identifiers
- IUPAC name: 3-(2-ammonioethyl)-1H-indol-4-yl hydrogen phosphate
- CAS Number: 21420-59-7
- PubChem CID: 9795063
- ChemSpider: 7970830
- UNII: C8CA0W9FJ9
- KEGG: C21778
- ChEBI: CHEBI:139479
- CompTox Dashboard (EPA): DTXSID601193769

Chemical and physical data
- Formula: C_{10}H_{13}N_{2}O_{4}P
- Molar mass: 256.198 g·mol^{−1}
- 3D model (JSmol): Interactive image
- SMILES: NCCc1c[nH]c2cccc(OP(=O)(O)O)c12
- InChI: InChI=1S/C10H13N2O4P/c11-5-4-7-6-12-8-2-1-3-9(10(7)8)16-17(13,14)15/h1-3,6,12H,4-5,11H2,(H2,13,14,15); Key:IKQGYCWFBVEAKF-UHFFFAOYSA-N

Norbaeocystin, also known as 4-phosphoryloxytryptamine (4-PO-T), is a psilocybin mushroom alkaloid of the tryptamine family and an analogue of psilocybin (4-PO-DMT). It is found as a minor compound in most psilocybin mushrooms, together with psilocybin, psilocin (4-HO-DMT), aeruginascin (4-PO-TMT), and baeocystin (4-PO-NMT), from which it is a derivative.

== Use and effects ==
Norbaeocystin is generally thought to be non-psychoactive, although this has not been confirmed.

== Pharmacology ==
Norbaeocystin (4-PO-T) is thought to be a prodrug of 4-hydroxytryptamine (4-HT), analogously to how psilocybin (4-PO-DMT) is a prodrug of psilocin (4-HO-DMT) and baeocystin (4-PO-NMT) is thought to be a prodrug of norpsilocin (4-HO-NMT). 4-HT is a potent and centrally penetrant serotonin 5-HT_{2A} receptor agonist and also interacts with other serotonin receptors. In spite of this however, 4-HT and norbaeocystin do not produce the head-twitch response, a behavioral proxy of psychedelic effects, in animals, and hence are putatively non-hallucinogenic. The reasons for this are unknown, but may be due to β-arrestin2-preferring biased agonism of the serotonin 5-HT_{2A} receptor.

== Chemistry ==
Norbaeocystin is an N-demethylated derivative of baeocystin (itself an N-demethylated derivative of psilocybin), and a phosphorylated derivative of 4-hydroxytryptamine (4-HT). The latter is notable as a positional isomer of serotonin, which is 5-hydroxytryptamine (5-HT).

=== Derivatives ===
Derivatives of norbaeocystin (4-PO-T), also known as substituted 4-phosphoryloxytryptamines, include baeocystin (4-PO-NMT), psilocybin (4-PO-DMT), ethocybin (4-PO-DET), 4-PO-DiPT, 4-PO-MET, and aeruginascin (4-PO-TMT), among others.

== History ==
Norbaeocystin was found to be sold as an analytical standard in 2023.

== See also ==
- Substituted tryptamine
- List of investigational hallucinogens and entactogens
