= C16H20N2 =

The molecular formula C_{16}H_{20}N_{2} may refer to:

- Benzathine
- Costaclavin
- DALT
- Festuclavine
- Pheniramine
- 3,3',5,5'-Tetramethylbenzidine (TMB)
