= Benzathine penicillin =

Benzathine penicillin is an ambiguous nickname for either of the following antibiotics:

- Benzathine penicillin G (benzathine benzylpenicillin)
- Benzathine penicillin V (benzathine phenoxymethylpenicillin)
