= C16H22N2 =

The molecular formula C_{16}H_{22}N_{2} (molar mass: 242.36 g/mol) may refer to:

- Propylallyltryptamine (PALT, ASR-3004)
- iPALT (ALiPT, ASR-3003)
