= 4-HO-MALT =

Chemical compound

Clinical data
- Other names: 4-OH-MALT; 4-Hydroxy-N-methyl-N-allyltryptamine; Maltocin; Malocin
- Routes of administration: Oral
- Drug class: Non-selective serotonin receptor agonist; Serotonin 5-HT_{2A} receptor agonist; Serotonergic psychedelic; Hallucinogen
- ATC code: None

Identifiers
- IUPAC name: 3-[2-[methyl(prop-2-enyl)amino]ethyl]-1H-indol-4-ol
- CAS Number: 2750249-95-5
- PubChem CID: 156147982
- ChemSpider: 84400432
- CompTox Dashboard (EPA): DTXSID301341967

Chemical and physical data
- Formula: C_{14}H_{18}N_{2}O
- Molar mass: 230.311 g·mol^{−1}
- 3D model (JSmol): Interactive image
- SMILES: CN(CCC1=CNC2=C1C(=CC=C2)O)CC=C
- InChI: InChI=1S/C14H18N2O/c1-3-8-16(2)9-7-11-10-15-12-5-4-6-13(17)14(11)12/h3-6,10,15,17H,1,7-9H2,2H3; Key:NWEWNVPCYZONHK-UHFFFAOYSA-N

4-HO-MALT, also known as 4-hydroxy-N-methyl-N-allyltryptamine or as maltocin, is a tryptamine derivative related to 4-HO-DALT (dalocin) which has been sold as a designer drug, first being detected in Slovenia in 2020.

== Use and effects ==
4-HO-MALT was not included nor mentioned in Alexander Shulgin's book TiHKAL (Tryptamines I Have Known and Loved). However, it has subsequently emerged as a novel designer drug. It is said to have a dose of 10 to 40 mg orally, with its effects including mild stimulation and visual changes.

== Pharmacology ==
=== Pharmacodynamics ===
4-HO-MALT acts as an agonist of the serotonin 5-HT_{2A}, 5-HT_{2B}, and 5-HT_{2C} receptors. It also interacts with other serotonin receptors. The drug produces the head-twitch response, a behavioral proxy of psychedelic effects, in rodents.

== Chemistry ==
=== Analogues ===
Analogues of 4-HO-MALT include methylallyltryptamine (MALT), 4-AcO-MALT, 5-MeO-MALT, 4-HO-DALT, 4-AcO-DALT, 4-HO-NALT, 4-HO-MiPT, 4-HO-McPT, and 4-HO-MPT, among others.

== History ==
4-HO-MALT was encountered online as a novel designer drug in 2018 and 2019. Subsequently, it was detected in Slovenia in 2020.

== Society and culture ==
=== Legal status ===
==== Canada ====
4-HO-MALT is not a controlled substance in Canada as of 2025.

== See also ==
- Substituted tryptamine
