= Benzathine benzylpenicillin/procaine benzylpenicillin =

Combination drug

Combination of
- Benzathine benzylpenicillin: Antibiotic
- Procaine benzylpenicillin: Antibiotic

Clinical data
- Trade names: Bicillin C-R
- AHFS/Drugs.com: Professional Drug Facts
- License data: US DailyMed: Penicillin_G_benzathine_and_penicillin_G_procaine
- Routes of administration: Intramuscular
- ATC code: J01CR50 (WHO)

Legal status
- Legal status: US: ℞-only

Identifiers
- CAS Number: 41372-02-5; 6130-64-9
- UNII: RIT82F58GK; 17R794ESYN

Benzathine benzylpenicillin/procaine benzylpenicillin, sold under the brand name Bicillin C-R, is an antibiotic medication. It contains the antibiotics benzathine benzylpenicillin (penicillin G benzathine) and procaine benzylpenicillin (penicillin G procaine).
