= Penicillium gorlenkoanum =

Scientific classification
- Domain: Eukaryota
- Kingdom: Fungi
- Division: Ascomycota
- Class: Eurotiomycetes
- Order: Eurotiales
- Family: Aspergillaceae
- Genus: Penicillium
- Species: P. gorlenkoanum

Binomial name
- Penicillium gorlenkoanum Baghdadi, V.V. 1968

Species of fungus

Penicillium gorlenkoanum is a species of the genus of Penicillium which produces citrinin, costaclavine and epicostaclavine.
