= Penicillium chermesinum =

Scientific classification
- Kingdom: Fungi
- Division: Ascomycota
- Class: Eurotiomycetes
- Order: Eurotiales
- Family: Aspergillaceae
- Genus: Penicillium
- Species: P. chermesinum

Binomial name
- Penicillium chermesinum Biourge, P. 1923

Type strain
- ATCC 48732, CBS 231.81, FRR 2048, IFO 31745, IMI 191730, KCTC 6422, NBRC 31745, NRRL 2048, NRRL 22753, NRRL A-889, QM 5195

Species of fungus

Penicillium chermesinum is an anamorph fungus species of the genus of Penicillium which was isolated from soil from Nova Scotia in Canada.Penicillium chermesinum produces plastatin, luteosporin, xanthomegnin, azaphilones, p-terphenyls and costaclavine.

== See also ==
- List of Penicillium species
