= 5-MeO-MALT =

Chemical compound

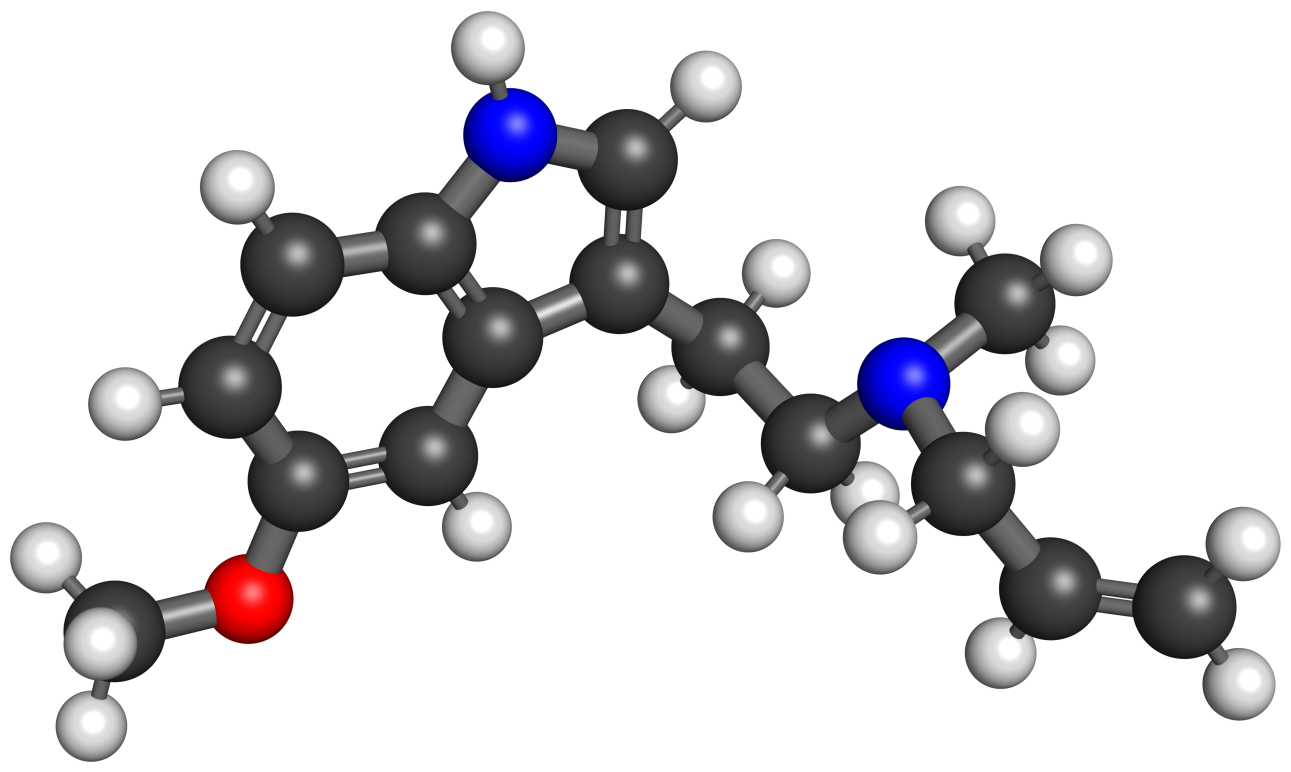

Clinical data
- Other names: 5-Methoxy-N-methyl-N-allyltryptamine
- Drug class: Non-selective serotonin receptor agonist; Serotonin 5-HT_{2A} receptor agonist; Serotonergic psychedelic; Hallucinogen

Legal status
- Legal status: DE: NpSG (Industrial and scientific use only); UK: Class A

Identifiers
- IUPAC name: N-[2-(5-Methoxy-1H-indol-3-yl)ethyl]-N-methylprop-2-en-1-amine
- CAS Number: 1373918-64-9
- PubChem CID: 129846174
- ChemSpider: 58191434
- UNII: 2G9RT827RJ
- CompTox Dashboard (EPA): DTXSID501032906

Chemical and physical data
- Formula: C_{15}H_{20}N_{2}O
- Molar mass: 244.338 g·mol^{−1}
- 3D model (JSmol): Interactive image
- SMILES: COC2=CC=C1[NH]C=C(C1=C2)CCN(CC=C)C
- InChI: InChI=1S/C15H20N2O/c1-4-8-17(2)9-7-12-11-16-15-6-5-13(18-3)10-14(12)15/h4-6,10-11,16H,1,7-9H2,2-3H3; Key:AJHGTCBMUIJSQL-UHFFFAOYSA-N

5-MeO-MALT, also known as 5-methoxy-N-methyl-N-allyltryptamine, is a psychedelic drug of the tryptamine family related to 5-MeO-DALT.

5-MeO-MALT was first described in the literature in 2004. It was encountered as a novel designer drug in 2014. The drug's pharmacology was studied and described in greater detail in 2024.

== Use and effects ==
5-MeO-MALT was not included nor mentioned in Alexander Shulgin's book TiHKAL (Tryptamines I Have Known and Loved).

== Pharmacology ==
=== Pharmacodynamics ===
The pharmacology of 5-MeO-MALT has been studied. It is a potent serotonin 5-HT_{2A} receptor agonist and produces the head-twitch response in rodents. The drug also shows high affinity for the serotonin 5-HT_{1A} receptor.

== Chemistry ==
=== Analogues ===
Analogues of 5-MeO-MALT include methylallyltryptamine (MALT), 4-HO-MALT (maltocin), 4-AcO-MALT, 5-MeO-DMT, 5-MeO-DET, 5-MeO-DPT, 5-MeO-DiPT, 5-MeO-DALT, 5-MeO-MET, 5-MeO-MPT, 5-MeO-MiPT, 5-MeO-EiPT, and 5-MeO-iPALT (ASR-3001), among others.

== Society and culture ==
=== Legal status ===
==== Canada ====
5-MeO-MALT is not a controlled substance in Canada as of 2025.

==== Hungary ====
5-MeO-MALT is illegal in Hungary.

==== Sweden ====
Sweden's public health agency suggested classifying 5-MeO-MALT as a hazardous substance, on May 15, 2019.

==== United States ====
5-MeO-MALT is not an explicitly controlled substance in the United States. However, it could be considered a controlled substance under the Federal Analogue Act if intended for human consumption.

== See also ==
- Substituted tryptamine
