= Methylallyltryptamine =

Chemical compound

MALT

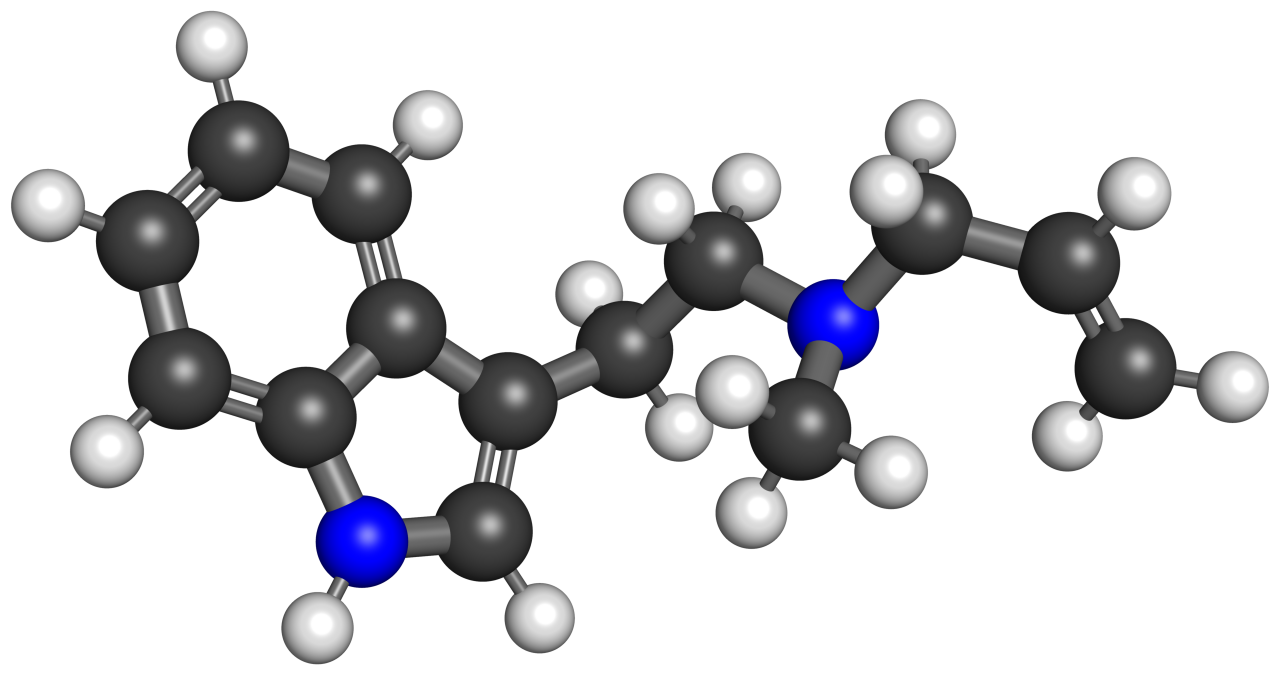

Clinical data
- Other names: MALT; N,N-Methylallyltyptamine
- Routes of administration: Oral, smoking, vaping
- Drug class: Serotonin receptor modulator; Serotonergic psychedelic; Hallucinogen
- ATC code: None

Legal status
- Legal status: UK: Class A; US: Analogue to a Schedule I/II drug; UN: Unscheduled

Pharmacokinetic data
- Onset of action: Unknown
- Duration of action: Unknown

Identifiers
- IUPAC name: N-[2-(1H-indol-3-yl)ethyl]-N-methylprop-2-en-1-amine
- CAS Number: 1366416-29-6
- PubChem CID: 155907915
- ChemSpider: 74902443
- UNII: R3PSM6BEG8
- CompTox Dashboard (EPA): DTXSID501337077

Chemical and physical data
- Formula: C_{14}H_{18}N_{2}
- Molar mass: 214.312 g·mol^{−1}
- 3D model (JSmol): Interactive image
- SMILES: CN(CCC1=CNC2=CC=CC=C21)CC=C
- InChI: InChI=1S/C14H18N2/c1-3-9-16(2)10-8-12-11-15-14-7-5-4-6-13(12)14/h3-7,11,15H,1,8-10H2,2H3; Key:GXCLVBGFBYZDAG-UHFFFAOYSA-N

Methylallyltryptamine (MALT), also known as N-methyl-N-allyltryptamine, is a lesser-known psychedelic drug from the tryptamine family. It is a novel compound with very little history of human use. It is closely related to methylpropyltryptamine (MPT). The drug has been sold online as a designer drug. Very little information on the pharmacology or toxicity of MALT is available.

== Use and effects ==
MALT was not included in Alexander Shulgin's 1997 book TiHKAL (Tryptamines I Have Known and Loved). However, years after the book's publication, he described MALT as having important unexplored potential as a psychedelic drug. Subsequently, MALT was encountered as a novel designer drug. It has been reported to have been used at doses of 25 to 50 mg via routes including oral, smoking, or vaping. The drug's effects have been described as comparable to those of methylpropyltryptamine (MPT) but less pronounced.

== Pharmacology ==
=== Pharmacodynamics ===
MALT is a serotonin receptor modulator and has been found to interact with the serotonin 5-HT_{1A}, 5-HT_{2A}, and 5-HT_{2C} receptors.

== Chemistry ==
=== Analogues ===
Analogues of MALT include 4-HO-MALT, 4-AcO-MALT, 5-MeO-MALT, diallyltryptamine (DALT), methylpropyltryptamine (MPT), and methylisopropyltryptamine (MiPT), among others.

== History ==
MALT was first described in the scientific literature by Niels Jensen of the University of Göttingen by 2004. The drug was subsequently first encountered as a novel designer drug by 2018.

== Society and culture ==
=== Legal status ===
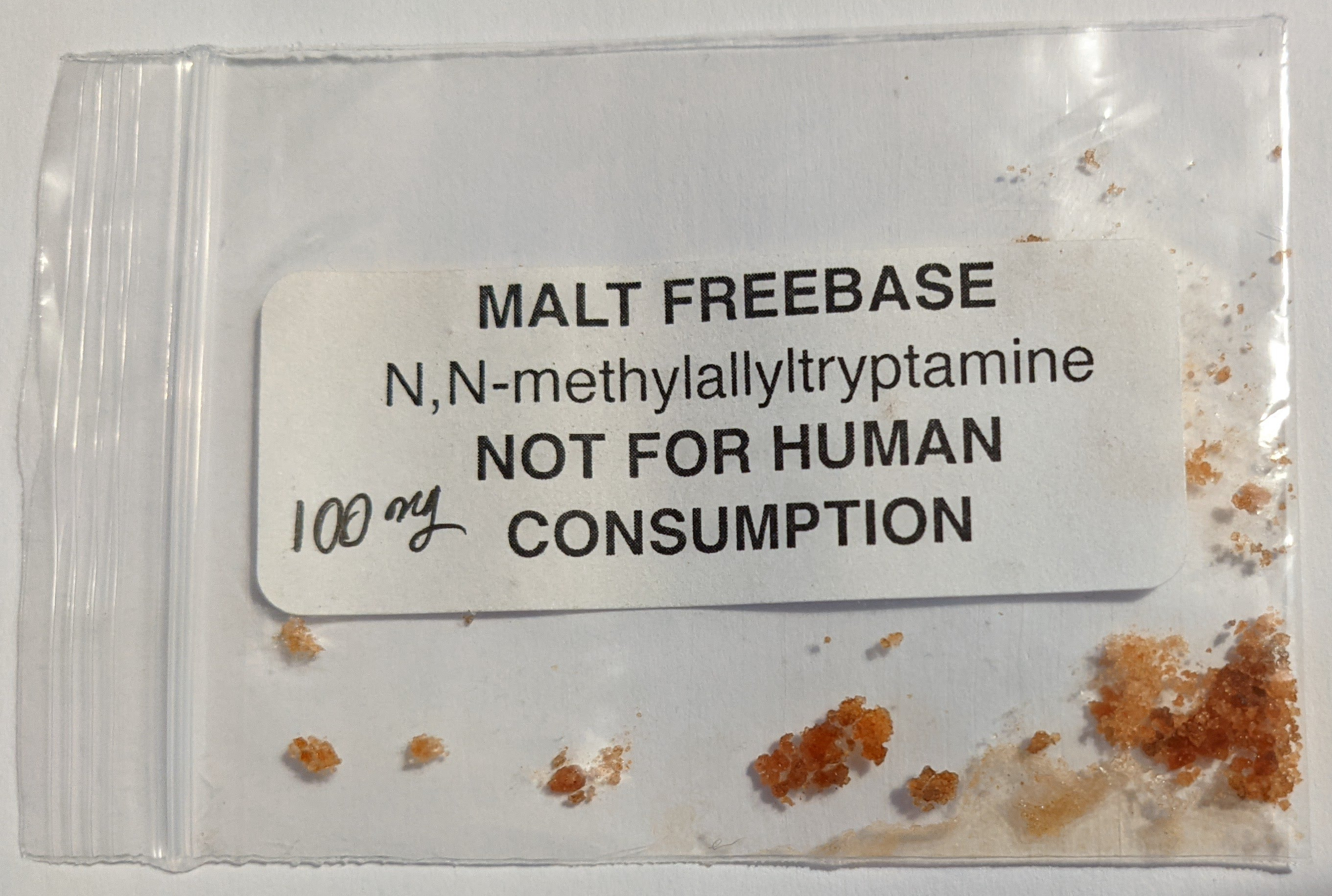
A ziplock bag containing 100mg of MALT crystals, labeled "Not for human consumption".

MALT is not explicitly scheduled in any countries; however, it could be considered a psychoactive substance under the United Kingdom Psychoactive Substances Act, which requires the prosecutor to prove that the substance is psychoactive in order for a person to be charged with an offense. It could also be considered a structural analogue of a scheduled substance under the United States Federal Analogue Act due to its similarity to scheduled tryptamines. It is not a controlled substance in Canada as of 2025.

== See also ==
- Substituted tryptamine
