= Festuclavine dehydrogenase =

Identifiers
- EC no.: 1.5.1.44

Databases
- IntEnz: IntEnz view
- BRENDA: BRENDA entry
- ExPASy: NiceZyme view
- KEGG: KEGG entry
- MetaCyc: metabolic pathway
- PRIAM: profile
- PDB structures: RCSB PDB PDBe PDBsum
Search
- PMC: articles
- PubMed: articles
- NCBI: proteins

Festuclavine dehydrogenase (EC 1.5.1.44, FgaFS, festuclavine synthase) is an enzyme with systematic name festuclavine:NAD^{+} oxidoreductase. This enzyme catalyses the following chemical reaction

festuclavine + NAD^{+} $\rightleftharpoons$ 6,8-dimethyl-6,7-didehydroergoline + NADH + H^{+}

The enzyme takes part in the biosynthesis of fumigaclavine C.
