= 4-AcO-MALT =

Clinical data
- Other names: 4-Acetoxy-MALT; 4-Acetoxy-N-methyl-N-allyltryptamine
- Routes of administration: Oral
- Drug class: Serotonin receptor modulator; Serotonergic psychedelic; Hallucinogen
- ATC code: None

Identifiers
- IUPAC name: [3-[2-[methyl(prop-2-enyl)amino]ethyl]-1H-indol-4-yl] acetate
- CAS Number: 2711006-97-0
- PubChem CID: 155923091
- ChemSpider: 84400431
- UNII: 8NYS4CX2BB

Chemical and physical data
- Formula: C_{16}H_{20}N_{2}O_{2}
- Molar mass: 272.348 g·mol^{−1}
- 3D model (JSmol): Interactive image
- SMILES: C=CCN(CCc1c[nH]c2c1c(ccc2)OC(=O)C)C
- InChI: InChI=1S/C16H20N2O2/c1-4-9-18(3)10-8-13-11-17-14-6-5-7-15(16(13)14)20-12(2)19/h4-7,11,17H,1,8-10H2,2-3H3; Key:PGBFYUDKPCYIEB-UHFFFAOYSA-N

4-AcO-MALT, also known as 4-acetoxy-N-methyl-N-allyltryptamine, is a psychedelic drug of the tryptamine family. It is the acetate ester of 4-HO-MALT.

== Pharmacology ==
=== Pharmacodynamics ===
4-AcO-MALT is assumed to act as a prodrug of the serotonergic psychedelic 4-HO-MALT. 4-HO-MALT is a serotonin receptor modulator, including acting as an agonist of the serotonin 5-HT_{2} receptors. The receptor interactions of 4-AcO-MALT have also been studied.

== Chemistry ==
=== Analogues ===
Analogues of 4-AcO-MALT include methylallyltryptamine (MALT), 4-HO-MALT (maltocin), 5-MeO-MALT, 4-AcO-DMT (psilacetin), 4-AcO-MET (metacetin), 4-AcO-MPT, 4-AcO-MiPT (mipracetin), and 4-AcO-DALT, among others.

== History ==
4-AcO-MALT was first described in the scientific literature by at least 2021. It has been encountered as a novel designer drug.

== See also ==
- Substituted tryptamine
