= 4-HO-DALT =

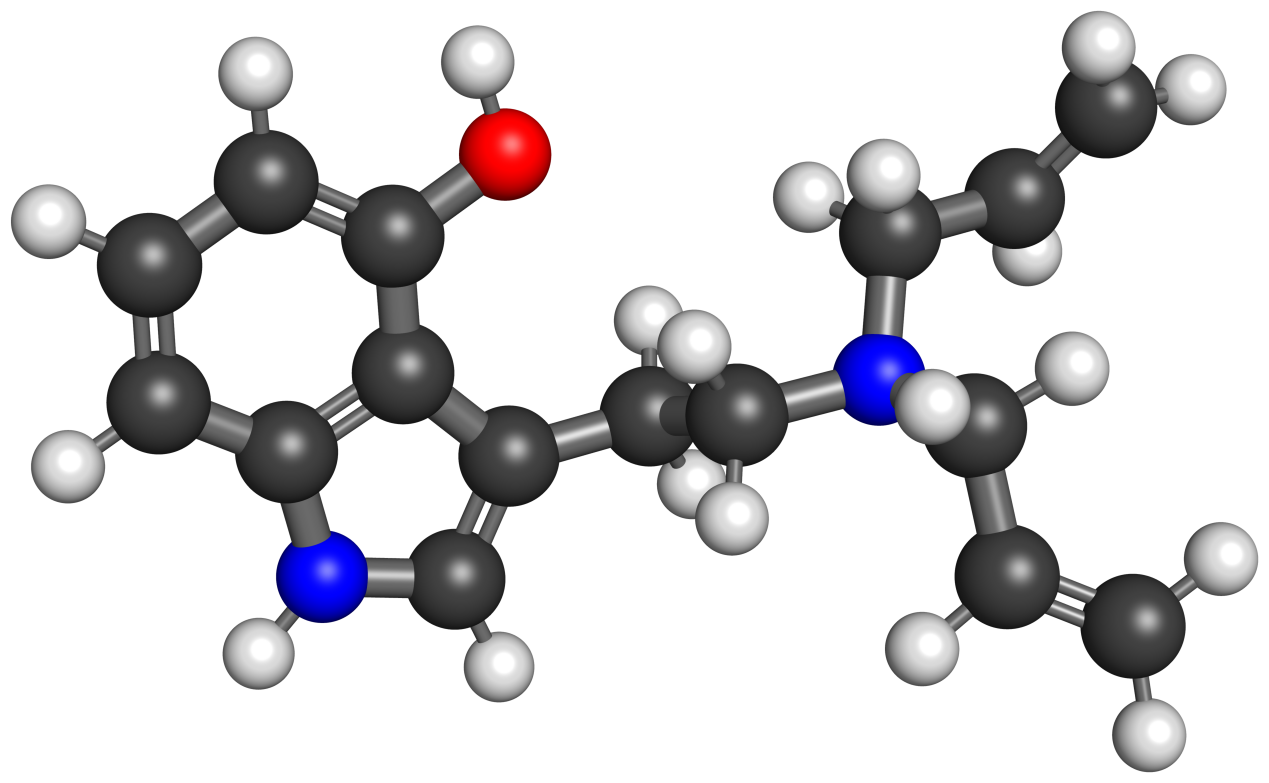

Clinical data
- Other names: 4-Hydroxy-N,N-diallyltryptamine; 4-Hydroxy-DALT; 4-OH-DALT; Daltocin; Dalocin
- Drug class: Serotonin receptor agonist; Serotonergic psychedelic; Hallucinogen
- ATC code: None

Identifiers
- IUPAC name: 3-[2-[bis(prop-2-enyl)amino]ethyl]-1H-indol-4-ol
- CAS Number: 2173386-70-2
- PubChem CID: 119026031
- ChemSpider: 52085332
- UNII: 44YV9DEA7I
- CompTox Dashboard (EPA): DTXSID101342026

Chemical and physical data
- Formula: C_{16}H_{20}N_{2}O
- Molar mass: 256.349 g·mol^{−1}
- 3D model (JSmol): Interactive image
- SMILES: C=CCN(CCC1=CNC2=C1C(=CC=C2)O)CC=C
- InChI: InChI=1S/C16H20N2O/c1-3-9-18(10-4-2)11-8-13-12-17-14-6-5-7-15(19)16(13)14/h3-7,12,17,19H,1-2,8-11H2; Key:JVIWQWJXRKVJTA-UHFFFAOYSA-N

4-HO-DALT, also known as 4-hydroxy-N,N-diallyltryptamine or as daltocin, is a serotonin receptor agonist and serotonergic psychedelic of the tryptamine and 4-hydroxytryptamine families. It has been encountered as a novel designer drug.

== Use and effects ==
4-HO-DALT was not included nor mentioned in Alexander Shulgin's book TiHKAL (Tryptamines I Have Known and Loved). However, in a subsequently released entry, it was briefly mentioned. He does not appear to have synthesized or tested it and its properties were not described, but Shulgin hypothesized that the drug, in its prodrug form 4-AcO-DALT, would have a very rapid onset of action. Subsequently, 4-HO-DALT has emerged as a novel designer drug. It is said to produce hallucinogenic effects similar to those of 4-HO-DiPT and 4-HO-DPT.

== Pharmacology ==
=== Pharmacodynamics ===
4-HO-DALT binds to many of the serotonin receptors, including the serotonin 5-HT_{2A} receptor, as well as other targets. The drug acts as a potent full agonist of the serotonin 5-HT_{2A} and 5-HT_{2B} receptors, whereas it showed 60-fold lower potency as an agonist of the serotonin 5-HT_{2C} receptor compared to the serotonin 5-HT_{2A} receptor. It produces the head-twitch response, a behavioral proxy of psychedelic-like effects, in rodents.

== Chemistry ==
=== Analogues ===
Analogues of 4-HO-DALT include diallyltryptamine (DALT), 4-AcO-DALT, 5-MeO-DALT, 4-HO-MALT, psilocin (4-HO-DMT), 4-HO-DET (ethocin), 4-HO-DPT, and 4-HO-DiPT, among others.

== History ==
4-HO-DALT was first described by Alexander Shulgin in a follow-up entry of TiHKAL (Tryptamines I Have Known and Loved) in 2004. Subsequently, it was further described in 2017 and thereafter. The drug was encountered online as a novel designer drug by 2014. In 2023, it was found to be sold as an analytical standard.

== Society and culture ==
=== Legal status ===
==== Canada ====
4-HO-DALT is not a controlled substance in Canada as of 2025.

== See also ==
- Substituted tryptamine
