= Benzathine phenoxymethylpenicillin =

Chemical compound

Combination of
- Phenoxymethylpenicillin: antibiotic
- Benzathine: extends the time that phenoxymethylpenicillin works

Clinical data
- ATC code: J01CE10 (WHO)

Identifiers
- CAS Number: 5928-84-7
- PubChem CID: 64725
- ChemSpider: 58268
- UNII: 3T4EMH59ZU
- KEGG: D02405
- ChEBI: CHEBI:31973
- ChEMBL: ChEMBL1396177
- CompTox Dashboard (EPA): DTXSID80207999
- ECHA InfoCard: 100.025.152

Chemical and physical data
- 3D model (JSmol): Interactive image
- SMILES: CC1([C@@H](N2[C@H](S1)[C@@H](C2=O)NC(=O)COC3=CC=CC=C3)C(=O)O)C.CC1([C@@H](N2[C@H](S1)[C@@H](C2=O)NC(=O)COC3=CC=CC=C3)C(=O)O)C.C1=CC=C(C=C1)CNCCNCC2=CC=CC=C2
- InChI: InChI=1S/2C16H18N2O5S.C16H20N2/c2*1-16(2)12(15(21)22)18-13(20)11(14(18)24-16)17-10(19)8-23-9-6-4-3-5-7-9;1-3-7-15(8-4-1)13-17-11-12-18-14-16-9-5-2-6-10-16/h2*3-7,11-12,14H,8H2,1-2H3,(H,17,19)(H,21,22);1-10,17-18H,11-14H2/t2*11-,12+,14-;/m11./s1; Key:BBTOYUUSUQNIIY-ANPZCEIESA-N

Benzathine phenoxymethylpenicillin (or benzathine penicillin V) is a penicillin.
