= Benzathine =

Names
- Preferred IUPAC name N^{1},N^{2}-Dibenzylethane-1,2-diamine
- Other names N,N′-bis(phenylmethyl)ethane-1,2-diamine

Identifiers
CAS Number	140-28-3
3D model (JSmol)	Interactive image
ChEBI	CHEBI:51344
ChEMBL	ChEMBL193646
ChemSpider	8463
ECHA InfoCard	100.004.918
PubChem CID	8793
UNII	C659VZ7P7T
CompTox Dashboard (EPA)	DTXSID4048359
- InChI: InChI=1S/C16H20N2/c1-3-7-15(8-4-1)13-17-11-12-18-14-16-9-5-2-6-10-16/h1-10,17-18H,11-14H2 Key: JUHORIMYRDESRB-UHFFFAOYSA-N; InChI=1/C16H20N2/c1-3-7-15(8-4-1)13-17-11-12-18-14-16-9-5-2-6-10-16/h1-10,17-18H,11-14H2 Key: JUHORIMYRDESRB-UHFFFAOYAS
- SMILES: C1=CC=C(C=C1)CNCCNCC2=CC=CC=C2

Properties
Chemical formula	C_{16}H_{20}N_{2}
Molar mass	240.343 g/mol
Melting point	26 °C
- Except where otherwise noted, data are given for materials in their standard state (at 25 °C [77 °F], 100 kPa). verify (what is ?) Infobox references

Benzathine is a diamine used as a component in some medications including benzathine phenoxymethylpenicillin and benzathine benzylpenicillin. It stabilizes penicillins and increases the half-life.
