= IPALT =

iPALT

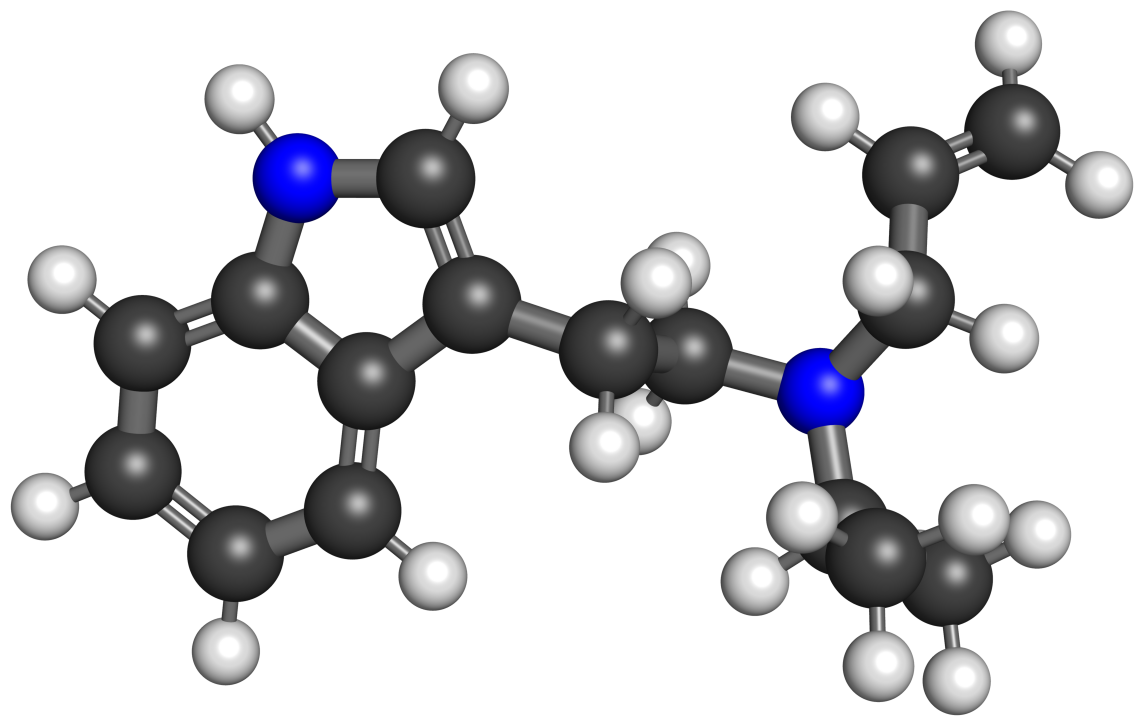

Clinical data
- Other names: ALiPT; ASR-3003; ASR3003; N-Isopropyl-N-allyltryptamine; N-Allyl-N-isopropyltryptamine
- Drug class: Serotonin receptor modulator; Serotonin 5-HT_{2A} receptor agonist
- ATC code: None

Identifiers
- IUPAC name: N-[2-(1H-indol-3-yl)ethyl]-N-prop-2-enylpropan-2-amine
- PubChem CID: 156836231

Chemical and physical data
- Formula: C_{16}H_{22}N_{2}
- Molar mass: 242.366 g·mol^{−1}
- 3D model (JSmol): Interactive image
- SMILES: CC(C)N(CCC1=CNC2=CC=CC=C21)CC=C
- InChI: InChI=1S/C16H22N2/c1-4-10-18(13(2)3)11-9-14-12-17-16-8-6-5-7-15(14)16/h4-8,12-13,17H,1,9-11H2,2-3H3; Key:DYIILRIYTXJTNJ-UHFFFAOYSA-N

iPALT, or ALiPT, also known as N-isopropyl-N-allyltryptamine or by its developmental code name ASR-3003, is a serotonin receptor modulator of the tryptamine family. It is an asymmetrical analogue of diisopropyltryptamine (DiPT) and diallyltryptamine (DALT). The drug is a non-selective serotonin receptor agonist, including of the serotonin 5-HT_{1B}, 5-HT_{2A}, 5-HT_{2B}, and 5-HT_{6} receptors, but not of the serotonin 5-HT_{1A} receptor. It is also a serotonin reuptake inhibitor, but does not inhibit dopamine or norepinephrine reuptake. The drug shows rather low potency for many of these actions, with for example 47-fold lower potency as a serotonin 5-HT_{2A} receptor agonist than the known psychedelic drug 5-MeO-iPALT (ASR-3001). The chemical synthesis of iPALT has been described. Derivatives of iPALT include 5-MeO-iPALT (ASR-3001), 4-HO-iPALT, and 2-Me-iPALT (ASR-3002). 5-MeO-iPALT is known to be a psychedelic drug in humans and is under development for potential medical use. iPALT was patented by the Alexander Shulgin Research Institute (ASRI) in 2024.

== See also ==
- Substituted tryptamine
- Propylallyltryptamine (PALT; ASR-3004)
