= Propylallyltryptamine =

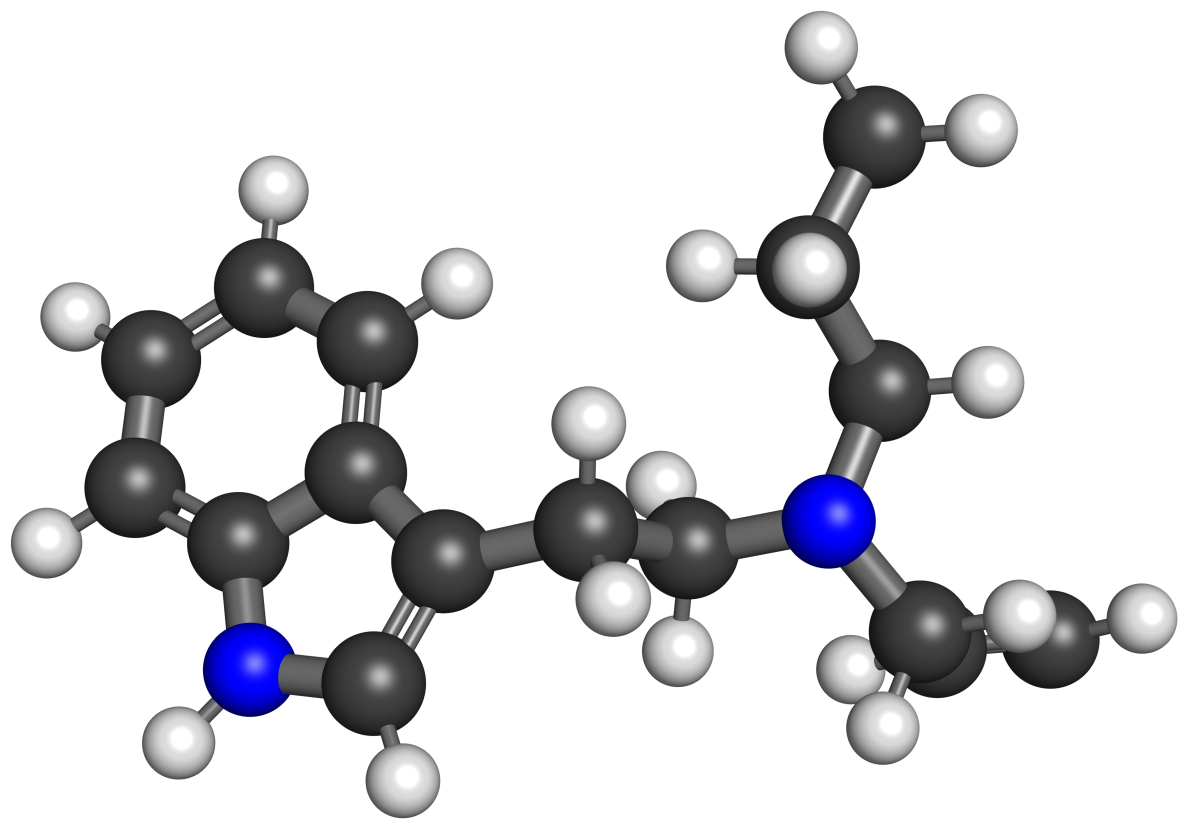

Clinical data
- Other names: PALT; N-Propyl-N-allyltryptamine; ASR-3004; ASR3004
- Drug class: Serotonin receptor modulator; Serotonin 5-HT_{2A} receptor agonist
- ATC code: None

Identifiers
- IUPAC name: N-[2-(1H-indol-3-yl)ethyl]-N-prop-2-enylpropan-1-amine
- CAS Number: 2686297-71-0
- PubChem CID: 138903953
- ChemSpider: 102827331

Chemical and physical data
- Formula: C_{16}H_{22}N_{2}
- Molar mass: 242.366 g·mol^{−1}
- 3D model (JSmol): Interactive image
- SMILES: CCCN(CCC1=CNC2=CC=CC=C21)CC=C
- InChI: InChI=1S/C16H22N2/c1-3-10-18(11-4-2)12-9-14-13-17-16-8-6-5-7-15(14)16/h3,5-8,13,17H,1,4,9-12H2,2H3; Key:BPHDZENPKNMIRD-UHFFFAOYSA-N

Propylallyltryptamine (PALT), also known as N-propyl-N-allyltryptamine or by its developmental code name ASR-3004, is a serotonin receptor modulator of the tryptamine family. It is an asymmetrical analogue of dipropyltryptamine (DPT) and diallyltryptamine (DALT). The drug is a non-selective serotonin receptor agonist, including of the serotonin 5-HT_{1B}, 5-HT_{2A}, 5-HT_{2B}, and 5-HT_{6} receptors, but not of the serotonin 5-HT_{1A} receptor. It is also a serotonin–norepinephrine–dopamine reuptake inhibitor (SNDRI). The chemical synthesis of PALT has been described. A notable analogue of PALT is iPALT (ASR-3003). PALT was patented by the Alexander Shulgin Research Institute (ASRI) in 2024.

== See also ==
- Substituted tryptamine
