= 4-AcO-DALT =

Chemical compound

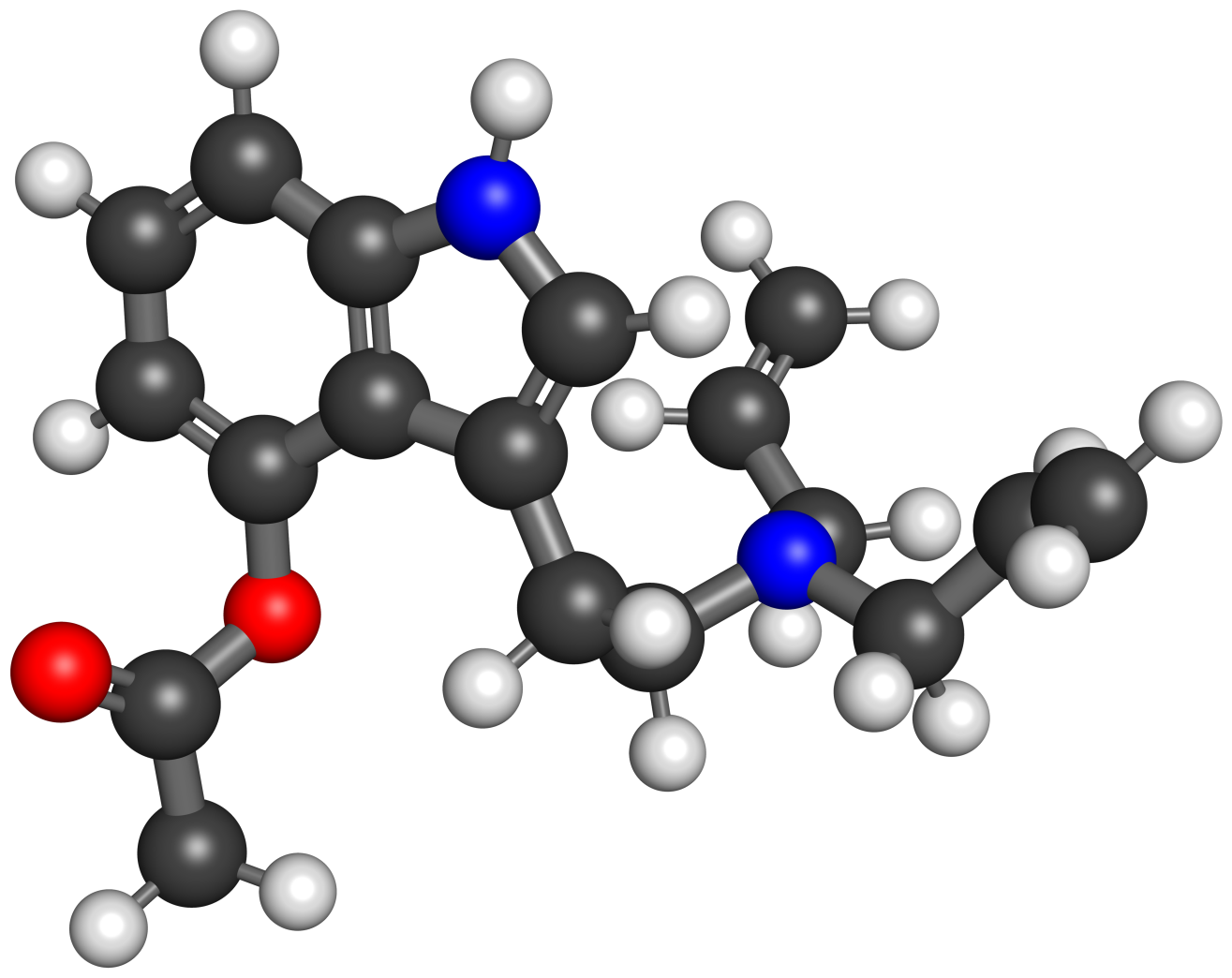

Clinical data
- Other names: 4-Acetoxy-N,N-diallyltryptamine; Dalcetin
- Routes of administration: Oral
- Drug class: Serotonergic psychedelic; Hallucinogen
- ATC code: None

Identifiers
- IUPAC name: [3-[2-[bis(prop-2-enyl)amino]ethyl]-1H-indol-4-yl] acetate
- CAS Number: 1445751-71-2
- PubChem CID: 119025857
- ChemSpider: 32078886
- UNII: 2Z8WS8Z4T1
- CompTox Dashboard (EPA): DTXSID601045423

Chemical and physical data
- Formula: C_{18}H_{22}N_{2}O_{2}
- Molar mass: 298.386 g·mol^{−1}
- 3D model (JSmol): Interactive image
- SMILES: CC(=O)Oc1cccc2c1c(c[nH]2)CCN(CC=C)CC=C
- InChI: InChI=1S/C18H22N2O2/c1-4-10-20(11-5-2)12-9-15-13-19-16-7-6-8-17(18(15)16)22-14(3)21/h4-8,13,19H,1-2,9-12H2,3H3; Key:WRHFDIBXZYYCHO-UHFFFAOYSA-N

4-AcO-DALT, also known as 4-acetoxy-N,N-diallyltryptamine or as dalcetin, is a tryptamine derivative. It has been sold as a designer drug, but little other information is available. It was first officially identified in seized drug samples in 2012.

== Pharmacology ==
=== Pharmacodynamics ===
4-HO-DALT and 4-AcO-DALT produce the head-twitch response, a behavioral proxy of psychedelic-like effects, in rodents. The receptor interactions of 4-HO-DALT and 4-AcO-DALT have been studied.

== Chemistry ==
=== Analogues ===
Analogues of 4-AcO-DALT include diallyltryptamine (DALT), 4-HO-DALT, 5-MeO-DALT, 4-AcO-DMT (psilacetin), 4-AcO-DET (ethacetin), 4-AcO-DiPT (ipracetin), and 4-AcO-MALT, among others.

== See also ==
- Substituted tryptamine
