= DALT =

Chemical compound

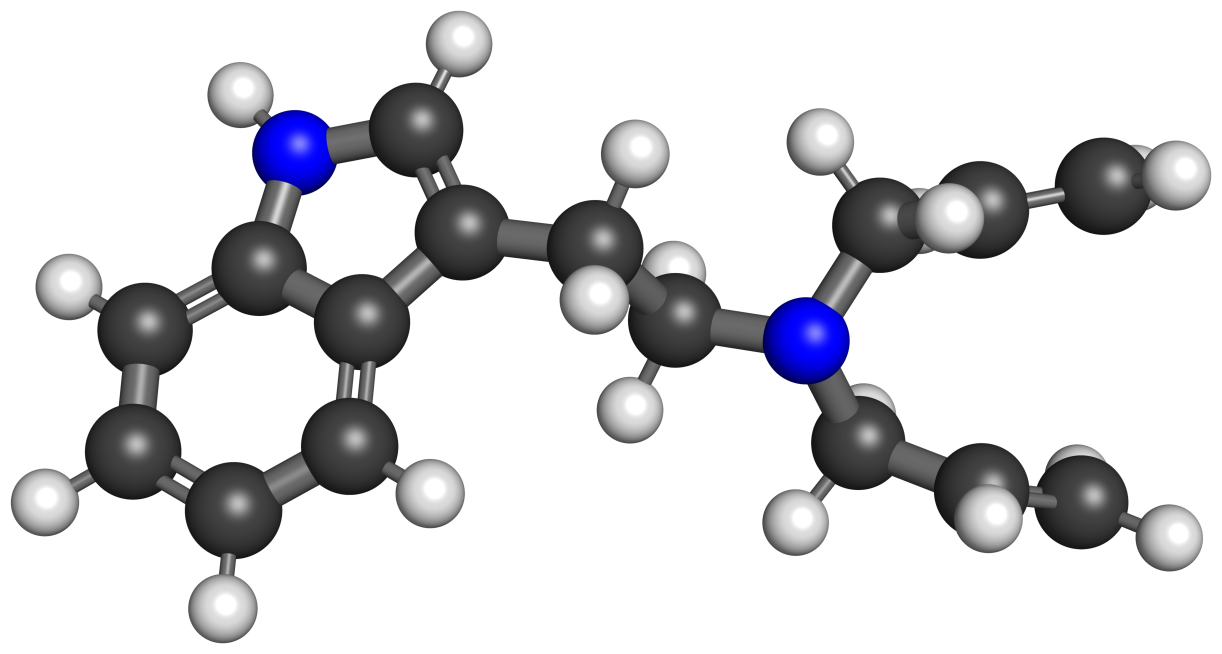

Clinical data
- Other names: N,N-Diallyltryptamine; DALT; DAT
- Routes of administration: Oral, intramuscular injection
- Drug class: Serotonin receptor modulator; Serotonergic psychedelic; Hallucinogen
- ATC code: None

Legal status
- Legal status: DE: NpSG (Industrial and scientific use only); UK: Class A; US: Analogue to a Schedule I/II drug (possibly); UN: Unscheduled but not approved for human consumption.; in theory could be covered under similar analogue bills in other countries but this is not confirmed.

Identifiers
- IUPAC name: N-Allyl-N-[2-(1H-indol-3-yl)ethyl]prop-2-en-1-amine
- CAS Number: 60676-77-9
- PubChem CID: 24839550
- ChemSpider: 21250454
- UNII: 85113MO9BC
- CompTox Dashboard (EPA): DTXSID001024249

Chemical and physical data
- Formula: C_{16}H_{20}N_{2}
- Molar mass: 240.350 g·mol^{−1}
- 3D model (JSmol): Interactive image
- SMILES: C=CCN(CC=C)CCc2c[nH]c1ccccc12
- InChI: InChI=1S/C16H20N2/c1-3-10-18(11-4-2)12-9-14-13-17-16-8-6-5-7-15(14)16/h3-8,13,17H,1-2,9-12H2; Key:LQEATNFJCMVKAC-UHFFFAOYSA-N

Diallyltryptamine (DALT), also known as N,N-diallyltryptamine, is a tryptamine derivative which has been identified as a designer drug.

== Use and effects ==
According to Alexander Shulgin in his book TiHKAL (Tryptamines I Have Known and Loved), the dose of DALT is greater than 40 mg orally and its duration is unknown. Its effects were not described. Per Stephen Szara and colleagues in much earlier publications however, DALT and other extended N,N-dialkyltryptamines produce similar effects to dimethyltryptamine (DMT) but are longer-lasting, with durations of up to 3 hours.

== Pharmacology ==
=== Pharmacodynamics ===
DALT activities
Target	Affinity (K_{i}, nM)
5-HT_{1A}	100
5-HT_{1B}	>10,000
5-HT_{1D}	689
5-HT_{1E}	378
5-HT_{1F}	ND
5-HT_{2A}	701
5-HT_{2B}	61
5-HT_{2C}	385
5-HT_{3}	>10,000
5-HT_{4}	ND
5-HT_{5A}	>10,000
5-HT_{6}	1,718
5-HT_{7}	>10,000
α_{1A}	1,663
α_{1B}	1,369
α_{1D}	>10,000
α_{2A}	124
α_{2B}	305
α_{2C}	901
β_{1}–β_{3}	>10,000
D_{1}, D_{2}	>10,000
D_{3}	672
D_{4}, D_{5}	>10,000
H_{1}	127
H_{2}–H_{4}	>10,000
M_{1}–M_{5}	>10,000
I_{1}	ND
σ_{1}	101 (rat)
σ_{2}	356 (rat)
TAAR1	ND
MOR, DOR	>10,000
KOR	2,477
SERT	150 (K_{i})
NET	1,121 (K_{i})
DAT	1,406 (K_{i})
Notes: The smaller the value, the more avidly the drug binds to the site. All proteins are human unless otherwise specified. Refs:

The receptor interactions of DALT have been studied. The drug produces the head-twitch response, a behavioral proxy of psychedelic effects, in rodents.

== Chemistry ==
DALT has been used as an intermediate in the preparation of radiolabeled diethyltryptamine (DET).

=== Synthesis ===
The chemical synthesis of DALT has been described.

=== Analogues ===
Analogues of DALT include 4-HO-DALT, 4-AcO-DALT, 5-MeO-DALT, methylallyltryptamine (MALT), propylallyltryptamine (PALT), and isopropylallyltryptamine (iPALT), among others.

== History ==
DALT was first described in the scientific literature by Stephen Szara and colleagues by 1962.

== Society and culture ==
=== Legal status ===
==== Canada ====
DALT is not an explicitly nor implicitly controlled substance in Canada as of 2025.

==== United States ====
DALT is not an explicitly controlled substance in the United States. However, it could be considered a controlled substance under the Federal Analogue Act if intended for human consumption.

== See also ==
- Substituted tryptamine
