= Costaclavin =

Names
- IUPAC name 6,8β-Dimethyl-10β-ergoline
- Systematic IUPAC name (6aR,9R,10aS)-7,9-Dimethyl-4,6,6a,7,8,9,10,10a-octahydroindolo[4,3-fg]quinoline
- Other names: 6,8-Dimethylergoline; Costaclavine; Epicostaclavin; Festuclavin; Festuclavine; Pyroclavin; Pyroclavine

Identifiers
| CAS Number | 436-41-9 |
| 3D model (JSmol) | Interactive image |
| ChemSpider | 141006 |
| PubChem CID | 160462 |
| UNII | GLS7Y869AV |
| CompTox Dashboard (EPA) | DTXSID90963054 |
- InChI: InChI=1S/C16H20N2/c1-10-6-13-12-4-3-5-14-16(12)11(8-17-14)7-15(13)18(2)9-10/h3-5,8,10,13,15,17H,6-7,9H2,1-2H3/t10-,13+,15-/m1/s1 Key: VLMZMRDOMOGGFA-RIEGTJTDSA-N; InChI=1/C16H20N2/c1-10-6-13-12-4-3-5-14-16(12)11(8-17-14)7-15(13)18(2)9-10/h3-5,8,10,13,15,17H,6-7,9H2,1-2H3/t10-,13+,15-/m1/s1 Key: VLMZMRDOMOGGFA-RIEGTJTDBP
- SMILES: C[C@@H]1C[C@@H]2[C@@H](CC3=CNC4=CC=CC2=C34)N(C1)C

Properties
| Chemical formula | C_{16}H_{20}N_{2} |
| Molar mass | 240.350 g·mol^{−1} |
- Except where otherwise noted, data are given for materials in their standard state (at 25 °C [77 °F], 100 kPa). Infobox references

Costaclavin is an ergoline fungal isolate, chemically related to festuclavine. It was first isolated from Agropyrum fungi in 1956 and its chemical structure was elucidated in 1976.

Several laboratory syntheses of costaclavin have been reported.
