= Festuclavine =

Names
- IUPAC name 6,8β-Dimethylergoline
- Systematic IUPAC name (6aR,9R,10aR)-7,9-Dimethyl-4,6,6a,7,8,9,10,10a-octahydroindolo[4,3-fg]quinoline

Identifiers
CAS Number	436-41-9
3D model (JSmol)	Interactive image
ChemSpider	294963
PubChem CID	332915
UNII	GLS7Y869AV
CompTox Dashboard (EPA)	DTXSID00205432
- InChI: InChI=1S/C16H20N2/c1-10-6-13-12-4-3-5-14-16(12)11(8-17-14)7-15(13)18(2)9-10/h3-5,8,10,13,15,17H,6-7,9H2,1-2H3/t10-,13-,15-/m1/s1 Key: VLMZMRDOMOGGFA-WDBKCZKBSA-N
- SMILES: C[C@@H]1C[C@@H]2c3cccc4c3c(c[nH]4)C[C@H]2N(C1)C

Properties
Chemical formula	C_{16}H_{20}N_{2}
Molar mass	240.350 g·mol^{−1}
- Except where otherwise noted, data are given for materials in their standard state (at 25 °C [77 °F], 100 kPa). Infobox references

Festuclavine is an ergoline fungal isolate.

== See also ==
- Festuclavine dehydrogenase
