= Benzathine benzylpenicillin =

Antibiotic

Combination of
- Benzylpenicillin: antibiotic
- Benzathine: stabilizer

Clinical data
- Trade names: Bicillin L-A, Permapen, others
- Other names: penicillin benzathine benzyl, benzathine penicillin, penicillin G benzathine, benzylpenicillin benzathine, benzathine penicillin G
- AHFS/Drugs.com: Professional Drug Facts
- License data: US DailyMed: Penicillin G benzathine
- Pregnancy category: AU: A
- Routes of administration: Intramuscular injection
- ATC code: J01CE08 (WHO)

Legal status
- Legal status: CA: ℞-only; US: ℞-only

Identifiers
- CAS Number: 41372-02-5
- PubChem CID: 15232
- DrugBank: DB01053
- ChemSpider: 14498
- UNII: RIT82F58GK
- KEGG: D02157
- ChEBI: CHEBI:51352
- ChEMBL: ChEMBL3989515
- E number: E708 (antibiotics)
- CompTox Dashboard (EPA): DTXSID2047804
- ECHA InfoCard: 100.014.782

Benzathine benzylpenicillin, also known as benzathine penicillin G (BPG), is an antibiotic medication useful for the treatment of a number of bacterial infections. Specifically it is used to treat strep throat, diphtheria, syphilis, and yaws. It is also used to prevent rheumatic fever. It is given by injection into a muscle. It is known as "Peanut Butter Shot" in US military slang due to its viscosity.

Side effects include allergic reactions including anaphylaxis, and the site of injection is notoriously painful. When used to treat syphilis a Jarisch–Herxheimer reaction may occur. It is not recommended in those with a history of penicillin allergy or those with syphilis involving the nervous system. Use during pregnancy is generally safe. It is in the penicillin and beta lactam class of medications and works via benzylpenicillin. The benzathine component slowly releases the penicillin making the combination long acting.

Benzathine benzylpenicillin was patented in 1950. It is on the World Health Organization's List of Essential Medicines.

== Medical uses ==
It is used to treat strep throat, diphtheria, syphilis, and yaws.

=== Chemopreventive ===
A single large 1.2-million-unit dose of intramuscular BPG is given to US military recruits. The Army in particular has a policy to inject all recruits if not allergic, though supply issues and individual base choices have reduced the coverage. A retrospective analysis shows that it reduces the rate of all-cause acute respiratory disease by 32% among Army recruits.

== Adverse effects ==
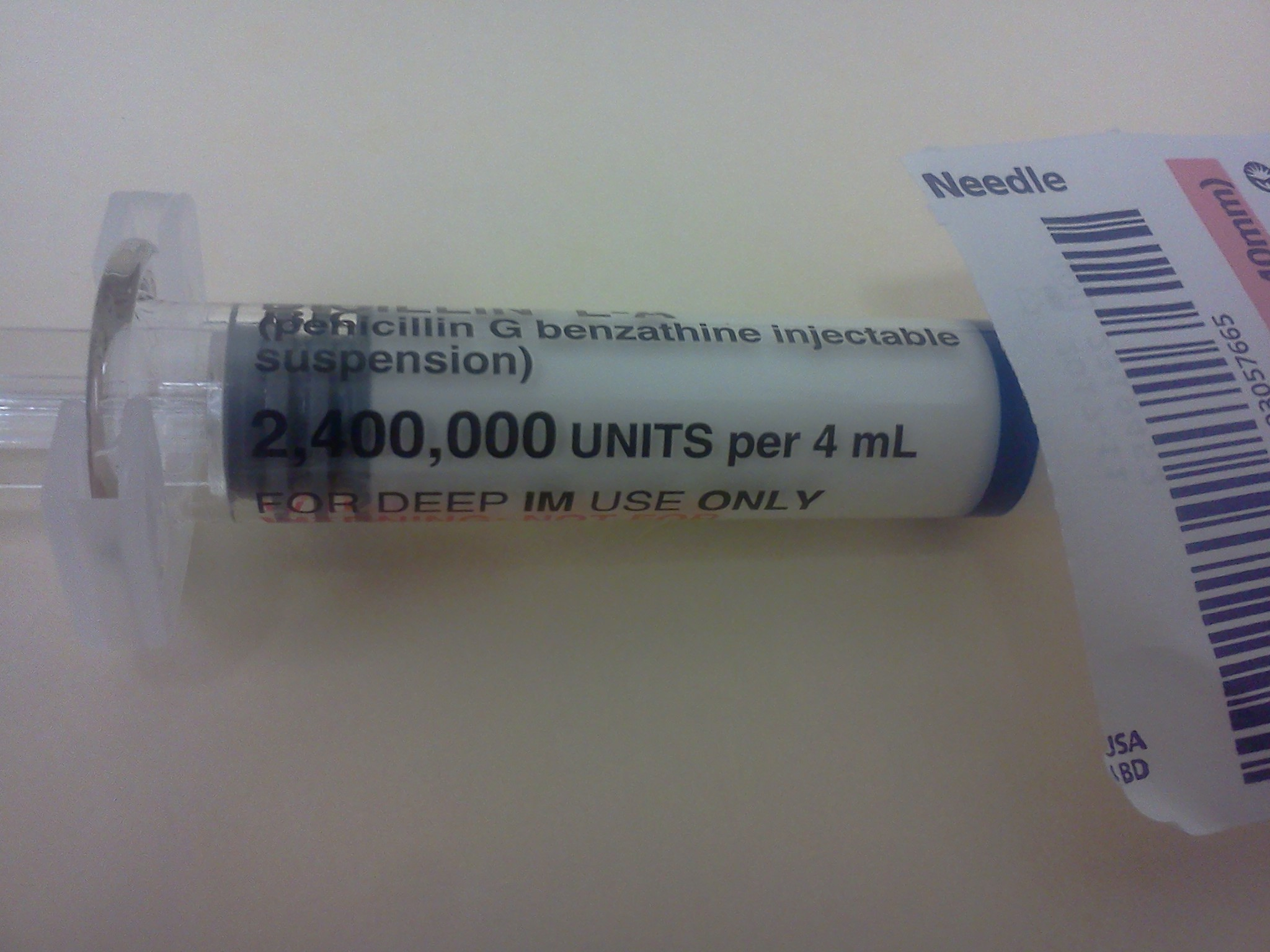
2,400,000 units of Bicillin L-A brand of benzylpenicillin, for deep intramuscular injection

The possible adverse effects are generally similar to other forms of penicillin. BPG is overall well-tolerated, but pain from the injection site is a common concern.

Benzathine penicillin may cause death through rapid cardiorespiratory arrest if injected intravenously. Onset occurs within seconds or minutes leading to loss of consciousness and cardiac arrest is often asystole. The occurrence is rare, but underlying cardiac conditions are a risk factor.

== Society and culture ==
It is marketed by Pfizer (formerly by Wyeth) under the trade name Bicillin L-A.

== Compendial status ==
- British Pharmacopoeia
