= C16H24N2O =

The molecular formula C_{16}H_{24}N_{2}O (molar mass : 260.38 g/mol) may refer to:

- 4-HO-DiPT, a synthetic hallucinogen
- 5-HO-DiPT
- 4-HO-DPT
- 5-HO-DPT
- 4-HO-EiBT
- 4-HO-PiPT
- 5-MeO-EiPT
- 5-MeO-EPT
- 5-MeO-MsBT
- 5-MeO-MBT
- Oxymetazoline
- Ropinirole, a non-ergoline dopamine agonist
- Tochergamine
