= 5-MeO-DET =

Psychedelic drug

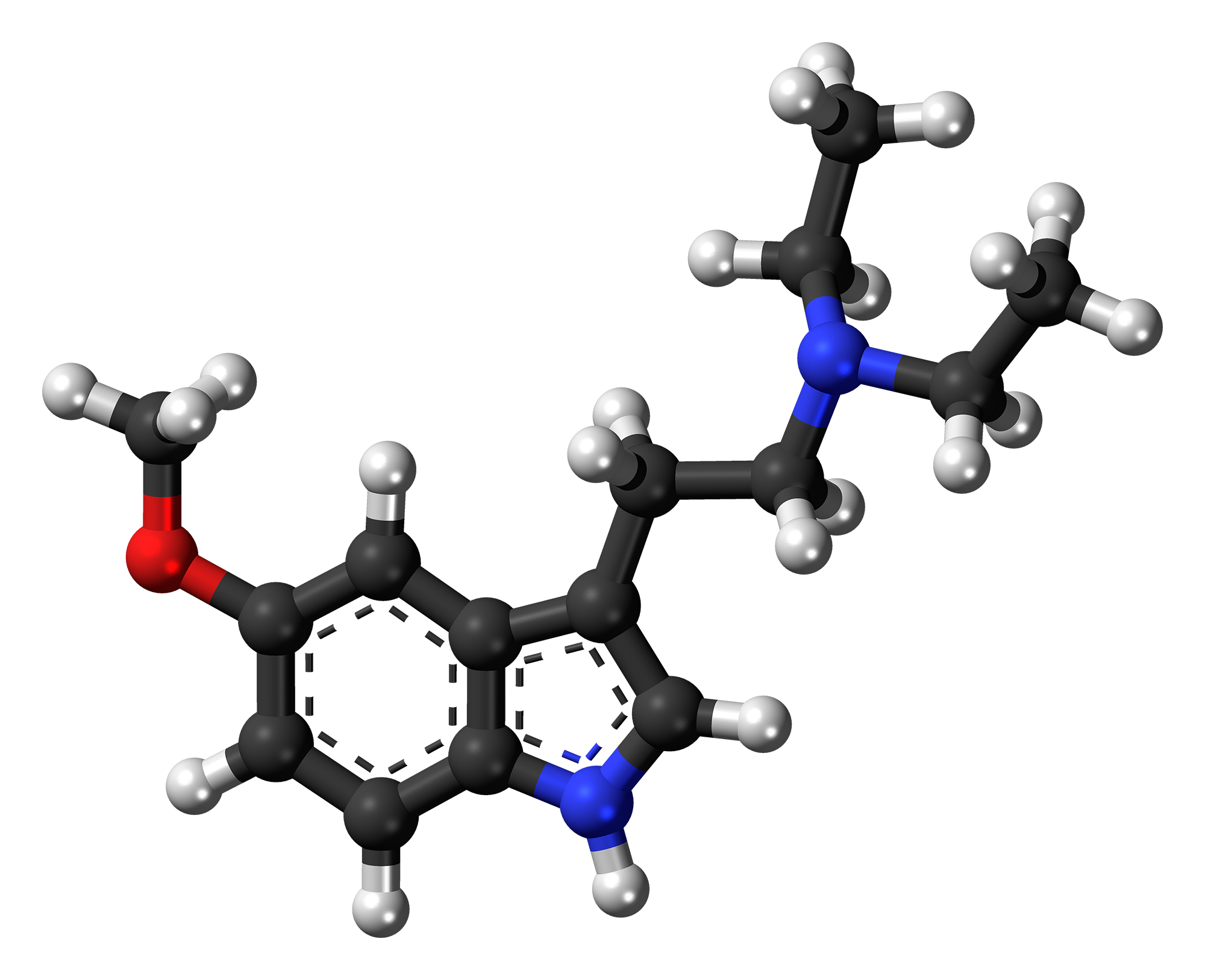

Clinical data
- Other names: 5-Methoxy-N,N-diethyltryptamine
- Routes of administration: Oral, smoking
- Drug class: Serotonin receptor agonist; Serotonin 5-HT_{2A} receptor agonist; Serotonergic psychedelic; Hallucinogen
- ATC code: None

Legal status
- Legal status: DE: NpSG (Industrial and scientific use only); UK: Class A

Pharmacokinetic data
- Onset of action: Oral: 20–30 minutes Smoking: A few minutes
- Duration of action: Oral: 3–4 hours Smoking: 1.5 hours

Identifiers
- IUPAC name: N,N-diethyl-2-(5-methoxy-1H-indol-3-yl)ethanamine
- CAS Number: 1218-40-2
- PubChem CID: 417608
- ChemSpider: 369669
- UNII: 52HU7LM8HL
- ChEMBL: ChEMBL342986
- CompTox Dashboard (EPA): DTXSID30329130

Chemical and physical data
- Formula: C_{15}H_{22}N_{2}O
- Molar mass: 246.354 g·mol^{−1}
- 3D model (JSmol): Interactive image
- SMILES: CCN(CC)CCc1c[nH]c2ccc(OC)cc12
- InChI: InChI=1S/C15H22N2O/c1-4-17(5-2)9-8-12-11-16-15-7-6-13(18-3)10-14(12)15/h6-7,10-11,16H,4-5,8-9H2,1-3H3; Key:KGDVJQQWCDDEPP-UHFFFAOYSA-N

5-MeO-DET, also known as 5-methoxy-N,N-diethyltryptamine is a psychedelic drug of the tryptamine family related to 5-MeO-DMT. It is taken orally but can also be used parenterally.

The drug produces strong side effects such as lightheadedness, dizziness, and vertigo at low doses that prevent hallucinogenic doses from being tolerated or used. It acts as a serotonin receptor modulator, including as an agonist of the serotonin 5-HT_{2A} receptor. 5-MeO-DET produces psychedelic-like effects in animals. Analogues of 5-MeO-DET include 5-MeO-DMT, 5-MeO-DPT, dipropyltryptamine (DPT), and 4-HO-DPT (deprocin), among others.

5-MeO-DET was first described in the literature by 1968. It was further described by Alexander Shulgin in his 1997 book TiHKAL (Tryptamines I Have Known and Loved). The drug was encountered as a novel designer drug in 2005.

== Use and effects ==
In his book TiHKAL (Tryptamines I Have Known and Loved), Alexander Shulgin lists 5-MeO-DET's dose as 1 to 3 mg orally and its duration as 3 to 4 hours. The onset was reported to be 20 to 30 minutes. There was also a report of smoking at a dose of 10 mg, with an onset of a few minutes and a duration of 1.5 hours, but this dose resulted in strong side effects that resulted in the user describing it as a "torture psychedelic".

The effects of 5-MeO-DET at oral doses have been reported to include strong lightheadedness, dizziness, vertigo, spaciness, body heaviness, fragility, need to lay down and stay that way, intoxication, drunkenness, uncomfortableness, negative mood, depression, tinnitus, sexual enhancement, wanting the drug to wear off as soon as possible, and unwillingness to take the drug again. Although there was an awareness of another interesting dimension beyond the side effects, there was a sense of the lightheadedness blocking everything else. This side effect was described as not being due to hypotension or dizziness but perhaps being something to do with the inner ear (e.g., vertigo). According to one report, if the lightheadedness or dizziness could be removed, 5-MeO-DET would be one of the best drugs for eroticism imaginable. In the high-dose smoked report, the effects included dizziness, intense heartbeat, trembling, anxiety, restlessness, cold sweating, paleness, abdominal cramps, feeling sick, some "visions", inability to concentrate on the visionary effects due to side effects, and feeling very glad when the drug wore off. As mentioned previously, the user described 5-MeO-DET as a "torture psychedelic" with this route and dose.

According to Shulgin, 5-MeO-DET possesses an unexpected new property of lightheadedness, vertigo, and intoxication suggestive of "neurotoxicity" that emerges at very low doses and that has not been observed with other 5-methoxytryptamines. These side effects have effectively precluded exploration of and ability to tolerate higher doses of the drug. Per Shulgin, based on extrapolation from its lower and higher homologues 5-MeO-DMT and 5-MeO-DiPT, respectively, 5-MeO-DET is anticipated to be an active psychedelic at doses of 10 mg or more parenterally and probably orally, but these doses cannot be achieved due to its strong side effects. This resulted in Shulgin stating that 5-MeO-DET was "one of the most provocative temptresses I have ever encountered" among the tryptamines and that it was a case of "having a protégé that you absolutely know will be a success if allowed to come to fulfillment, and yet you know that uncontrolled circumstances will prevent that fulfillment". He has said that these side effects may be unique to 5-MeO-DET and also pondered whether the same action that causes them could simultaneously be responsible for the "terrific erotic enhancement" the drug produces.

5-MeO-DET's higher homologue 5-MeO-DPT was also tested by Shulgin in hopes that the vertigo-related side effects could be removed. His experience with this drug was mixed, with it being better-tolerated and allowing for higher doses than 5-MeO-DET, but side effects nonetheless still outweighing desired effects. Shulgin explored and hypothesized about other possible 5-methoxytryptamines as well.

== Pharmacology ==
=== Pharmacodynamics ===
5-MeO-DET inhibits serotonin reuptake with an IC_{50} value of 2,400 nM and activates the serotonin 5-HT_{2A} receptor with an EC_{50} value of 8.1 nM. The drug fully substitutes for DOM in rodent drug discrimination tests. It also substitutes for 5-MeO-DMT in rodent drug discrimination tests. In addition, 5-MeO-DET produces the head-twitch response in rodents.

== Chemistry ==
=== Synthesis ===
The chemical synthesis of 5-MeO-DET has been described.

=== Analogues ===
Analogues of 5-MeO-DET include diethyltryptamine (DET), 4-HO-DET (ethocin), ethocybin (4-PO-DET), 5-HO-DET, 5-MeO-DMT, 5-MeO-DPT, 5-MeO-DiPT, 5-MeO-DALT, 5-MeO-MET, 5-MeO-MPT, 5-MeO-MiPT, 5-MeO-pyr-T, and 4-MeO-DET, among others.

== History ==
5-MeO-DET was first described in the scientific literature by 1968. It was described in greater detail by Alexander Shulgin in his 1997 book TiHKAL (Tryptamines I Have Known and Loved). The drug was encountered as a novel designer drug in Europe in 2005.

== Society and culture ==
=== Legal status ===
==== Canada ====
5-MeO-DET is not a controlled substance in Canada as of 2025.

==== United States ====
5-MeO-DET is not an explicitly controlled substance in the United States. However, it could be considered a controlled substance under the Federal Analogue Act if intended for human consumption.

== See also ==
- Substituted tryptamine
