= 5-MeO-DiPT =

Psychedelic tryptamine

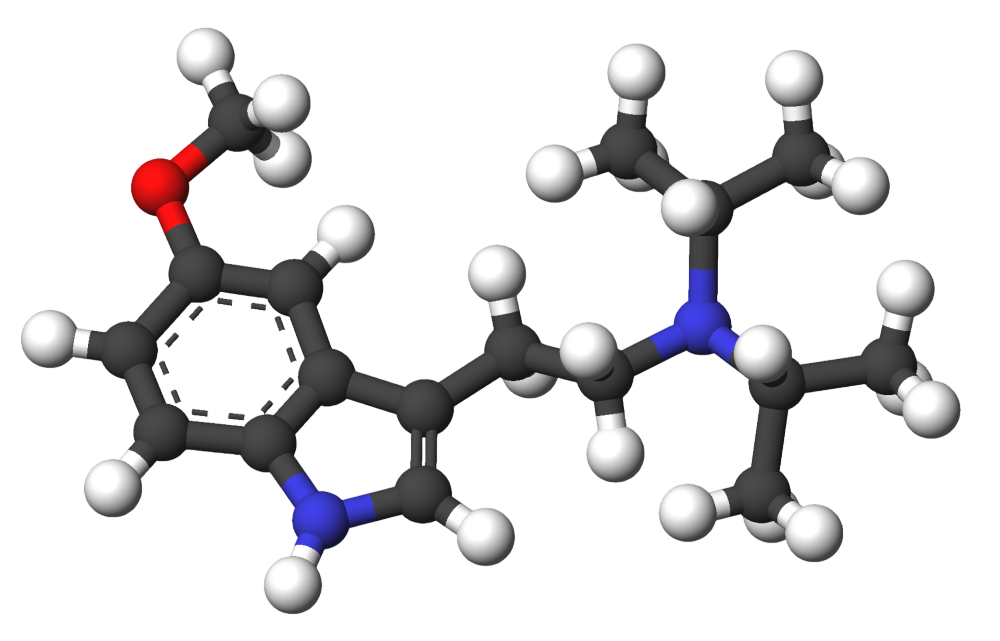

Clinical data
- Other names: 5-OMe-DiPT; 5-Methoxy-N,N-diisopropyltryptamine; Foxy; Foxy Methoxy
- Routes of administration: Oral, others
- Drug class: Non-selective serotonin receptor agonist; Serotonin 5-HT_{2A} receptor agonist; Serotonergic psychedelic; Hallucinogen; Entactogen; Stimulant

Legal status
- Legal status: BR: Class F2 (Prohibited psychotropics); CA: Unscheduled; DE: Anlage I (Authorized scientific use only); UK: Class A; US: Schedule I; UN: Unscheduled; In general Unscheduled and not approved for human consumption, Illegal in Sweden, Denmark, Greece, Japan, Singapore and China

Pharmacokinetic data
- Onset of action: 20–30 min or ≤1 hour
- Duration of action: 3–6 hours or 4–8 hours

Identifiers
- IUPAC name: N-[2-(5-methoxy-1H-indol-3-yl)ethyl]-N-propan-2-ylpropan-2-amine
- CAS Number: 4021-34-5
- PubChem CID: 151182
- DrugBank: DB01441
- ChemSpider: 133247
- UNII: 12D06G8W8E
- KEGG: C22724
- ChEBI: CHEBI:48282
- CompTox Dashboard (EPA): DTXSID00193209

Chemical and physical data
- Formula: C_{17}H_{26}N_{2}O
- Molar mass: 274.408 g·mol^{−1}
- 3D model (JSmol): Interactive image
- Melting point: 181 °C (358 °F)
- SMILES: CC(C)N(C(C)C)CCC1=C[NH]C(C=C2)=C1C=C2OC
- InChI: InChI=1S/C17H26N2O/c1-12(2)19(13(3)4)9-8-14-11-18-17-7-6-15(20-5)10-16(14)17/h6-7,10-13,18H,8-9H2,1-5H3; Key:DNBPMBJFRRVTSJ-UHFFFAOYSA-N

5-MeO-DiPT, also known as 5-methoxy-N,N-diisopropyltryptamine and sometimes as foxy methoxy or simply foxy, is an atypical psychedelic drug of the tryptamine and 5-methoxytryptamine families. It has unique and distinct effects from other serotonergic tryptamines, including some stimulant- and entactogen-like effects, robust tactile and sexual enhancement, and only light hallucinogenic effects. The drug is usually taken orally, but may also be used by other routes.

It acts as a non-selective serotonin receptor agonist, including of the serotonin 5-HT_{1A} and 5-HT_{2A} receptors among others. Uniquely among most tryptamines, the drug has been found to produce serotonergic neurotoxicity and associated cognitive deficits in rodents reminiscent of but distinct from those observed with MDMA. Various severe and/or fatal intoxications associated with 5-MeO-DiPT have been reported in humans. It is the 5-methoxy derivative of diisopropyltryptamine (DiPT) and is an analogue of other psychedelic tryptamines like 4-HO-DiPT, 5-MeO-DMT, and 5-MeO-MiPT.

5-MeO-DiPT was first described in the literature by Alexander Shulgin and colleagues in 1980. Subsequently, Shulgin described 5-MeO-DiPT in further detail in his 1997 book TiHKAL (Tryptamines I Have Known and Loved). The drug was first encountered as a novel designer drug in 1999. It is used recreationally as a "party drug" and sexual enhancer, with notable use among gay men and transgender women as part of "chemsex", although its use in general has declined over time and is rare. 5-MeO-DiPT became a controlled substance in the United States in 2003. The closely related drug 5-MeO-MiPT (moxy) has similar effects as 5-MeO-DiPT, remains legal in the United States and many other countries, and is often used as a substitute for 5-MeO-DiPT.

== Use and effects ==
In his book TiHKAL (Tryptamines I Have Known and Loved) and other publications, Alexander Shulgin reported the dose of 5-MeO-DiPT to be 6 to 12 mg orally, its onset to be 20 to 30 minutes or within 1 hour, its time to peak effects to be 1 to 1.5 hours, and its duration to be 4 to 8 hours. However, in other publications besides TiHKAL he gave a dose range of 6 to 10 mg or a dose range of 8 to 12 mg. According to Shulgin, testing of 5-MeO-DiPT started at a dose of 0.1 mg and gradually titrated up in 10 human volunteers, with threshold effects occurring at a dose of 4 mg orally and full effects occurring at doses of 6 mg or more. The drug has been described as "fast-acting" and its duration has also been reported to be "short-lived" and as brief as 3 to 6 hours. In addition to oral administration, 5-MeO-DiPT has been reported to be used less commonly by smoking, insufflation, or intravenous injection. Forms known to be used include powder, tablets, and capsules.

The psychedelic or perceptual effects of 5-MeO-DiPT have been reported to include colors on edges of eyesight, color contrasts and sparkle, altered facial perception, sensory distortion, few if any visual enhancements, some closed-eye imagery but only at high doses, feelings of strangeness, objects having special significance, some musical sound distortions reminiscent of those of DiPT, music sounding strange and fake, time dilation, having only mild hallucinogenic effects, outgoing rather than inwardly reflective intellectual activation, lack of intuitive leaps, and a wave-like experience wherein the effects "waved in and out". Affective and behavioral effects have included stimulation, some entactogen-like effects, talkativeness, disinhibition, emotional enhancement, opening of affect, easy emotional expression, easy communication with others, reduced guards and reservations, relaxation, feeling happy, mild euphoria, and mellowness. In addition, the drug has been reported to produce tactile or sensual enhancement, one's body feeling alive and alert, feeling like waves are passing back and forth over one's body, awareness of vibrations, feeling sexually aroused, and "dramatic" erotic or sexual enhancement.

Negative emotional and behavioral effects have included uncomfortableness, agitation, feeling unnerved, paranoia, and social avoidance, but no hangover. 5-MeO-DiPT has been described as having minimal physical side effects and as being relatively free of autonomic side effects and indicators of toxicity. Reported physical side effects have included body load and discomfort, slight pupil dilation, mild nausea, some muscular hyperreflexia, muscle contractions and spasms, gastrointestinal disturbances, hypertension, and little change in appetite or sleep disruption. The effects of 5-MeO-DiPT have been described as either being "positive" or a "mixed bag". User responses are said to vary dramatically, with some people finding it appealing, sexual, invigorating, interesting, and enjoyable, and others finding it nauseating, annoying, diarrhea-inducing, and generally unpleasant.

5-MeO-DiPT has been described as LSD-like in some ways but as being quite different from other psychedelics. Descriptions have included the drug never being psychedelic in the way of classical psychedelics like LSD and psilocybin, there being an absence of intense sensory disturbances or hallucinogenic effects as with other psychedelics like dimethyltryptamine (DMT) and psilocybin, never feeling as though one was having a psychedelic experience, and being able to function normally on a social level including at public events even at high doses. However, one user who took a high dose described reaching a "plus-three" on the Shulgin Rating Scale in a very LSD-like manner but without the visuals. Higher doses may produce more psychedelic effects, but the drug is still described as not that psychedelic even at such doses. Despite its lack of robust hallucinogenic effects at typical doses, 5-MeO-DiPT is described as nonetheless producing quite profound emotional and intellectual modifications.

5-MeO-DiPT is reported to differ in its subjective effects from the structurally related DiPT in most respects but to share some auditory effects with this drug. In terms of these effects, whereas DiPT caused harmonic distortion of heard sounds, 5-MeO-DiPT caused changes in musical character and interpretation without apparent changes in harmonic structure. As such, while both produced auditory effects, DiPT and 5-MeO-DiPT caused different distortions of musical interpretation. 5-MeO-DiPT has been described as a "psychedelic stimulant" and has a reputation as a "sexual enhancer" or "aphrodisiac". Among its effects, the pro-sexual effects of 5-MeO-DiPT have been especially highlighted, with these effects being present at low doses. Users have remarked that it took them to a "marvelous sexy place", that "everything [was] shaded with eroticism", that the "erotic world was fantastic, explosive, almost scary", and that the drug may vie with 2C-B as a sexual enhancer or that it left 2C-B "in the dust" in this regard.

5-MeO-DiPT has been described as having effects similar to those of 5-MeO-MiPT and these drugs as having unique and distinct effects from those of other psychedelic tryptamines. They are reported to be very pro-sexual, much more stimulant, and more like party drugs than other tryptamines. While 5-MeO-DiPT and 5-MeO-MiPT are described as pro-sexual, they may not be innately aphrodisiac but instead may produce tactile enhancement in a way that lends itself to sex. The tactile enhancement and "body high" with 5-MeO-DiPT and 5-MeO-MiPT may in part be why they have been compared to entactogens like MDMA. 5-MeO-DiPT has been described as being closer to MDMA in its effects than to psychedelic tryptamines and that the effects are a "body high kind of thing". The drug is also known to be combined with other drugs such as MDMA.

== Side effects ==
Flashbacks have been reported with 5-MeO-DiPT. There is a report of a prolonged delusional state associated with 5-MeO-DiPT.

== Overdose ==
Excessive doses or overdose have caused clinical intoxication, characterized by nausea, vomiting, agitation, hypotension, mydriasis, tachycardia, and hallucinations, in a number of young adults. A number of these overdoses are attributed to the drug's delayed onset of action, where first time users, who were unfamiliar with the drug, administered a second dose after initially feeling no effects. Rhabdomyolysis and renal failure occurred in one young man and another one died 3 to 4 hours after an apparent rectal overdose. There have been a number of published cases of severe and/or fatal intoxication with 5-MeO-DiPT.

== Interactions ==
The effects of 5-MeO-DiPT may be potentiated when used in combination with cannabis.

== Pharmacology ==
=== Pharmacodynamics ===
5-MeO-DiPT activities
Target	Affinity (K_{i}, nM)
5-HT_{1A}	16–240 (K_{i}); 34–>10,000 (EC_{50}); 44–114% (E_{max})
5-HT_{1B}	5,137–>10,000 (K_{i}); 85–170 (EC_{50}); 100–134% (E_{max})
5-HT_{1D}	293–1,718 (K_{i}); 41–126 (EC_{50}); 92–104% (E_{max})
5-HT_{1E}	>10,000 (K_{i}); 407–2,190 (EC_{50}); 67–86% (E_{max})
5-HT_{1F}	ND (K_{i}); 871–3,240 (EC_{50}); 53–83% (E_{max})
5-HT_{2A}	162–>10,000 (K_{i}); 6.2–946 (EC_{50}); 99–124% (E_{max})
5-HT_{2B}	35–163 (K_{i}); 13–56 (EC_{50}); 80–110% (E_{max})
5-HT_{2C}	1,740–>10,000 (K_{i}); 30–1,789 (EC_{50}); 71–101% (E_{max})
5-HT_{3}	>10,000
5-HT_{4}	ND
5-HT_{5A}	>10,000 (K_{i}) >10,000 (EC_{50}); ND (E_{max})
5-HT_{6}	1,820–>10,000 (K_{i}); 324 (EC_{50}); 87% (E_{max})
5-HT_{7}	1,231–>10,000 (K_{i}) >10,000 (EC_{50}); ND (E_{max})
α_{1A}, α_{1B}, α_{1D}	>10,000
α_{2A}	3,936–>10,000
α_{2B}	5,293–>10,000
α_{2C}	2,865–>10,000
β_{1}, β_{2}, β_{3}	>10,000
D_{1}–D_{5}	>10,000
H_{1}	1,567–>10,000
H_{2}–H_{4}	>10,000
M_{1}–M_{5}	>10,000
I_{1}	760
σ_{1}	2,239–>10,000
σ_{2}	291–3,002
OR	>10,000
TAAR1	ND
SERT	874–>10,000 (K_{i}); 239–24,215 (IC_{50}) >100,000 (EC_{50}) (rat)
NET	3,236–>10,000 (K_{i}); 8,200–>10,000 (IC_{50}) >100,000 (EC_{50}) (rat)
DAT	>10,000 (K_{i}); 65,000 (IC_{50}) >100,000 (EC_{50}) (rat)
Notes: The smaller the value, the more avidly the drug interacts with the site. All proteins are human unless otherwise specified. Refs:

5-MeO-DiPT acts as a non-selective serotonin receptor agonist, including of the serotonin 5-HT_{1A}, 5-HT_{1B}, 5-HT_{1D}, 5-HT_{2A}, 5-HT_{2B}, and 5-HT_{2C} receptors, among others. It has shown variably strong preference for the serotonin 5-HT_{1A} receptor in terms of binding affinity, with 2-fold, 25-fold, >76-fold, and 161-fold higher for this receptor over the serotonin 5-HT_{2A} receptor in different studies. However, in terms of receptor activation, 5-MeO-DiPT showed similar potency at the serotonin 5-HT_{1A} receptor and the serotonin 5-HT_{2A} receptor and had several-fold preference for these receptors over the serotonin 5-HT_{2C} receptor.

In addition to its direct serotonin receptor interactions, 5-MeO-DiPT is a serotonin reuptake inhibitor with potency ranging from similar to its serotonin 5-HT_{2A} receptor agonism to very low in different studies. Conversely, it does not significantly affect dopamine or norepinephrine reuptake and shows no activity as a monoamine releasing agent. The drug can block the serotonin release induced by methamphetamine in vitro. 5-MeO-DiPT can elevate brain serotonin levels in rodents, presumably via its serotonin reuptake inhibition. The elevations in serotonin levels caused by 5-MeO-DiPT may be limited by its concomitant serotonin 5-HT_{1A} receptor agonism, as serotonin 5-HT_{1A} receptors serve as inhibitory autoreceptors that limit serotonin release. By an unknown mechanism, but possibly serotonin 5-HT_{2A} receptor agonism, 5-MeO-DiPT may also elevate brain dopamine levels in rodents, including in the prefrontal cortex, striatum, and/or nucleus accumbens, although findings are mixed. The mechanism of action of the psychedelic effects of 5-MeO-DiPT is thought to be serotonin 5-HT_{2A} receptor agonism, but its full mechanism of action is unclear and additional mechanisms may also be involved.

5-MeO-DiPT produces the head-twitch response, a behavioral proxy of psychedelic-like effects, in rodents. As with many other psychedelics, this follows an inverted U-shaped dose–response curve. The head-twitch response induced by 5-MeO-DiPT is blocked by serotonin 5-HT_{2A} receptor antagonists such as volinanserin. 5-MeO-DiPT's head-twitch response is described as robust but also weak and much lower in magnitude than that produced by other serotonergic psychedelics such as 5-MeO-DMT or DOM. The serotonin 5-HT_{1A} receptor agonism of 5-MeO-DiPT may inhibit its serotonin 5-HT_{2A} receptor-mediated head-twitch response. 5-MeO-DiPT partially substitutes for LSD in rodent drug discrimination tests, with 52% responding at 1 mg/kg, 75% responding at 3 mg/kg, and behavioral disruption at higher doses. In addition, it substitutes for DOM in rodent drug discrimination tests. The stimulus properties of 5-MeO-DiPT in LSD substitution tests are completely and insurmountably blocked by the serotonin 5-HT_{2A} receptor antagonist volinanserin. Conversely, they are partially and surmountably blocked by the serotonin 5-HT_{1A} receptor antagonist WAY-100635. Besides psychedelic-like effects, 5-MeO-DiPT also produces hypolocomotion and hypothermia in rodents and potentiates the forepaw treading induced by the serotonin 5-HT_{1A} receptor agonist 8-OH-DPAT.

==== Neurotoxicity ====
5-MeO-DiPT has been reported to produce neurotoxicity in rodents. Administration of 5-MeO-DiPT to adolescent rodents produced marked decreases in spatial navigation performance in adulthood that were suggestive of deficits in cognitive flexibility, attention, and/or perseveration as well as other cognitive deficits. This was associated with serotonergic neurotoxicity and substantial 26 to 49% reductions in cortical and hippocampal serotonin levels that were analogous to those occurring with MDMA. However, the neurotoxic effects of 5-MeO-DiPT are described as less severe than and distinct from those of MDMA. The drug has also been reported to produce cytotoxicity as well as neurotoxic effects on serotonergic neurons ex vivo. The mechanisms underlying the serotonergic neurotoxicity of 5-MeO-DiPT are unknown. The drug might also produce prolonged dopaminergic adaptations or dopaminergic neurotoxicity in rodents as evidenced by long-lasting decreases in dopamine levels. In addition, it has been associated with marked genotoxicity or oxidative DNA damage, which has also been seen with MDMA and methamphetamine. It has been said to be the first known tryptamine to be associated with such toxicity. However, various other psychedelics have also been found to produce neurotoxicity in preclinical research, with this including serotonergic neurotoxicity.

=== Pharmacokinetics ===
The pharmacokinetics and metabolism of 5-MeO-DiPT have been studied.

== Chemistry ==
=== Properties ===
The log P of 5-MeO-DiPT is 3.68.

=== Synthesis ===
The chemical synthesis of 5-MeO-DiPT has been described.

=== Analogues ===
Analogues of 5-MeO-DiPT include diisopropyltryptamine (DiPT), 4-HO-DiPT (iprocin), 4-AcO-DiPT (ipracetin), 4-MeO-DiPT, 5-HO-DiPT, 5-MeO-DMT, 5-MeO-DET, 5-MeO-DPT, 5-MeO-DALT, 5-MeO-MiPT, 5-MeO-MsBT, 5-MeO-EiPT, 5-MeO-PiPT, 5-MeO-iPALT (ASR-3001), and 5-MeO-DiBF (1-oxa-5-MeO-DiPT), among others. Another analogue, 5,6-dimethoxy-DiPT (5,6-DiMeO-DiPT or 5,6-MeO-DiPT), has also been described.

==== Positional isomers ====
4-MeO-DiPT, 6-MeO-DiPT, and 7-MeO-DiPT are known positional isomers of 5-MeO-DiPT. 6-MeO-DiPT and 7-MeO-DiPT have been described by Alexander Shulgin as being inactive at doses of up to 50 mg and 70 mg orally, respectively, whereas 4-MeO-DiPT was not assessed.

== History ==
5-MeO-DiPT was discovered in the 1970s and was first described by Alexander Shulgin and Michael Carter in 1980. Shulgin tested it and discovered its effects starting in 1975. The drug started to be encountered as a novel recreational and designer drug in 1999. 5-MeO-DiPT became a temporarily controlled substance in the United States in 2003 and a permanently controlled substance in 2004. The recreational use of 5-MeO-DiPT appears to have declined over time and its use is described as being not very prevalent.

== Society and culture ==
=== Recreational use ===
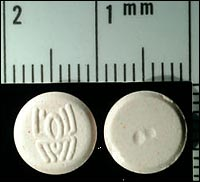
5-MeO-DiPT tablets seized from Salem, Oregon.

Use of 5-MeO-DiPT has been found to be particularly prevalent among gay men who use drugs as part of chemsex. It is also seen in transgender women. The drug is described as a stimulant, sexual enhancer, party drug, and light psychedelic. 5-MeO-DiPT has been associated with increased risk of HIV diagnosis in multiple studies in Asia, perhaps due to risky sexual behavior involving the drug.

=== Legal status ===
==== Canada ====
5-MeO-DiPT is not an explicitly nor implicitly controlled substance in Canada as of 2025.

==== China ====
As of October 2015, 5-MeO-DiPT is a controlled substance in China.

==== Denmark ====
Illegal since February 2004.

==== Germany ====
Illegal since September 1999.

==== Greece ====
Illegal since February 2003.

==== Japan ====
Illegal since April 2005.

==== Singapore ====
Illegal since early 2006.

==== Sweden ====
Sveriges riksdags health ministry Statens folkhälsoinstitut classified 5-MeO-DiPT as "health hazard" under the act Lagen om förbud mot vissa hälsofarliga varor (translated Act on the Prohibition of Certain Goods Dangerous to Health) as of Oct 1, 2004, in their regulation SFS 2004:696 listed as 5-metoxi-N,N-diisopropyltryptamin (5-MeO-DIPT), making it illegal to sell or possess.

==== United States ====
On April 4, 2003, the United States DEA added both 5-MeO-DiPT and α-methyltryptamine (AMT) to Schedule I of the Controlled Substances Act under "emergency scheduling" procedures. The drugs were officially placed into Schedule I on September 29, 2004. Prior to its prohibition in the U.S., 5-MeO-DiPT was sold online alongside psychoactive analogues such as diisopropyltryptamine (DiPT), and dipropyltryptamine (DPT), neither of which have yet been expressly outlawed.

== See also ==
- Substituted tryptamine
- Stimulant § Serotonin 5-HT_{2A} receptor agonists
