= C18H26N2O2 =

The molecular formula C_{18}H_{26}N_{2}O_{2} (molar mass: 302.418 g/mol) may refer to:

- 4-Acetoxy-DiPT
- 4-AcO-DPT
