= 5-MeO-PiPT =

Chemical compound

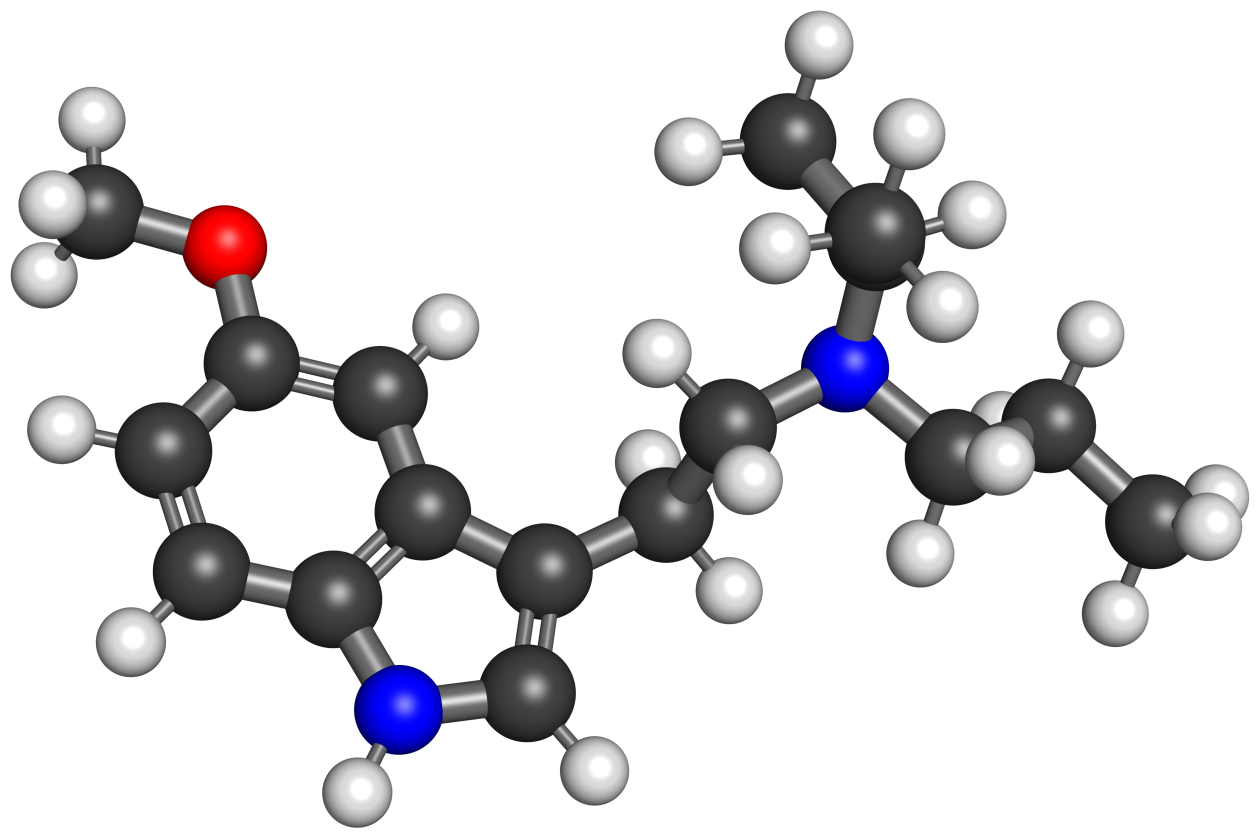

Clinical data
- Other names: 5-Methoxy-N-propyl-N-isopropyltryptamine; Poxy
- Drug class: Non-selective serotonin receptor agonist; Serotonin 5-HT_{2A} receptor agonist; Serotonergic psychedelic; Hallucinogen

Identifiers
- IUPAC name: N-[2-(5-methoxy-1H-indol-3-yl)ethyl]-N-(propan-2-yl)propan-1-amine
- CAS Number: 2945111-53-3
- PubChem CID: 166468735

Chemical and physical data
- Formula: C_{17}H_{26}N_{2}O
- Molar mass: 274.408 g·mol^{−1}
- 3D model (JSmol): Interactive image
- SMILES: CC(C)N(CCC)CCc1c[NH]c2ccc(cc21)OC
- InChI: InChI=1S/C17H26N2O/c1-5-9-19(13(2)3)10-8-14-12-18-17-7-6-15(20-4)11-16(14)17/h6-7,11-13,18H,5,8-10H2,1-4H3; Key:KLRSMSBDLVDLKK-UHFFFAOYSA-N

5-MeO-PiPT, also known as 5-methoxy-N-propyl-N-isopropyltryptamine or by its nickname Poxy, is a substituted tryptamine derivative which is claimed to have psychedelic effects. It has been sold as a designer drug, first being identified in 2021 in British Columbia, Canada.

== Use and effects ==
5-MeO-PiPT was not included nor mentioned in Alexander Shulgin's book TiHKAL (Tryptamines I Have Known and Loved).

== Pharmacology ==
=== Pharmacodynamics ===
5-MeO-PiPT acts as a serotonin 5-HT_{1A} and 5-HT_{2A} receptor agonist, with an EC_{50} of 13.8 nM and an efficacy of 89%.

== Chemistry ==
=== Analogues ===
Analogues of 5-MeO-PiPT include propylisopropyltryptamine (PiPT), 4-HO-PiPT, 5-MeO-DMT, 5-MeO-DPT, 5-MeO-DiPT, 5-MeO-MiPT, 5-MeO-EiPT, and 5-MeO-iPALT (ASR-3001), among others.

== See also ==
- Substituted tryptamine
