= 5-HO-DET =

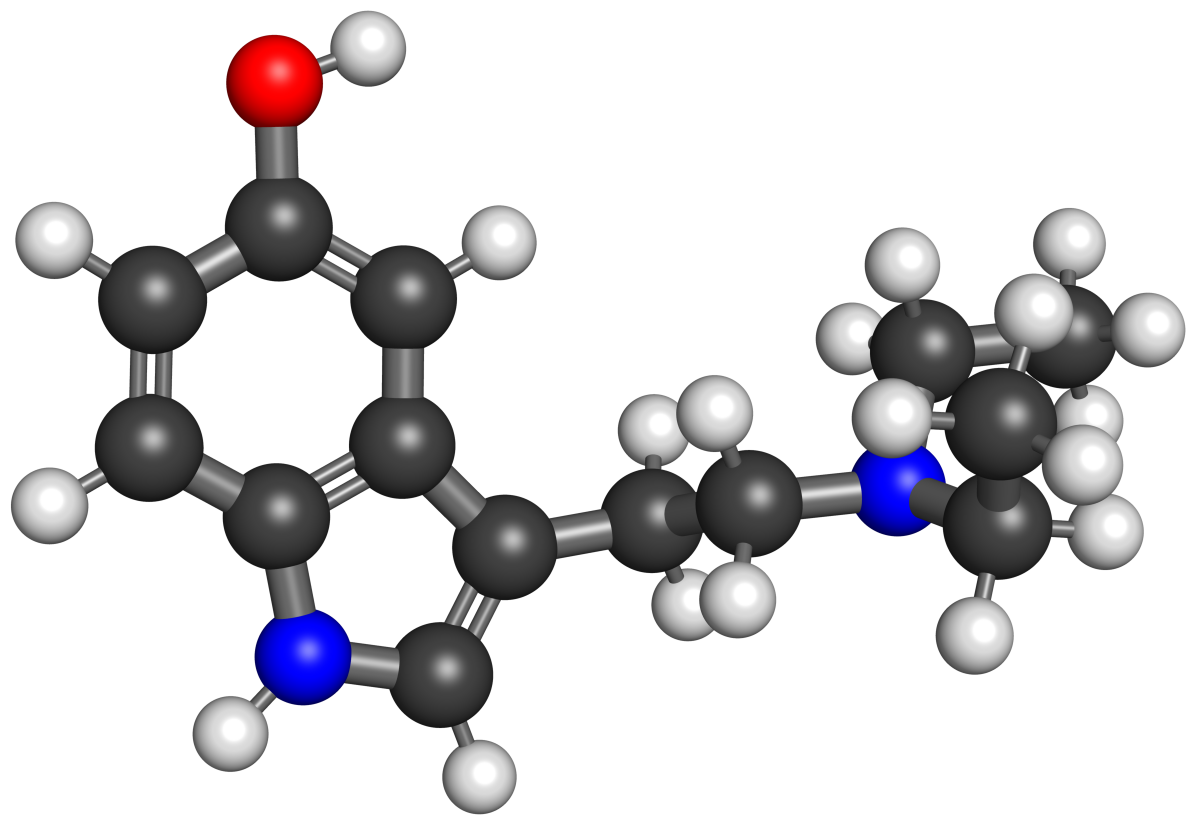

Clinical data
- Other names: 5-OH-DET; 5-Hydroxy-DET; 5-Hydroxy-N,N-diethyltryptamine
- Drug class: Serotonin receptor modulator
- ATC code: None

Identifiers
- IUPAC name: 3-[2-(diethylamino)ethyl]-1H-indol-5-ol
- CAS Number: 14009-42-8
- PubChem CID: 26395
- ChemSpider: 24590
- ChEMBL: ChEMBL142629
- CompTox Dashboard (EPA): DTXSID80161229

Chemical and physical data
- Formula: C_{14}H_{20}N_{2}O
- Molar mass: 232.327 g·mol^{−1}
- 3D model (JSmol): Interactive image
- SMILES: CCN(CC)CCC1=CNC2=C1C=C(C=C2)O
- InChI: InChI=1S/C14H20N2O/c1-3-16(4-2)8-7-11-10-15-14-6-5-12(17)9-13(11)14/h5-6,9-10,15,17H,3-4,7-8H2,1-2H3; Key:DLKZNHHXBDWTOP-UHFFFAOYSA-N

5-HO-DET, or 5-hydroxy-DET, also known as 5-hydroxy-N,N-diethyltryptamine, is a serotonin receptor modulator of the tryptamine and 5-hydroxytryptamine families related to the psychedelic drug bufotenin (5-HO-DMT). It is the derivative of bufotenin in which the N,N-dimethyl groups have been replaced with N,N-diethyl groups. The drug is also the N,N-diethyl derivative of serotonin (5-hydroxytryptamine) and the 5-hydroxy derivative of diethyltryptamine (DET).

== Pharmacology ==
=== Pharmacodynamics ===
5-HO-DET has been assessed and found to show high affinity for the serotonin 5-HT_{1E} and 5-HT_{1F} receptors. It was a potent serotonin receptor agonist in the rat stomach strip. The drug shows relatively low potency in terms of psychedelic-like behavioral effects in the conditioned avoidance response test in rodents. It has been suggested that this might be due to 5-HO-DET having poor lipophilicity and blood–brain barrier permeability analogously to bufotenin. However, 5-HO-DET has significantly greater lipophilicity than bufotenin owing to its ethyl instead of methyl groups (predicted log P = 1.9 and 1.2, respectively).

== Chemistry ==
=== Analogues ===
Analogues of 5-HO-DET include diethyltryptamine (DET), 4-HO-DET (ethocin), 4-AcO-DET (ethacetin), 4-PO-DET (ethocybin), 5-MeO-DET, bufotenin (5-HO-DMT), 5-HO-MET, 5-HO-DPT, 5-HO-DiPT, α-methylserotonin (5-HO-AMT), and N-methylserotonin (5-HO-NMT), among others.

== History ==
5-HO-DET was first described in the scientific literature by Hunt and Brimblecombe by at least 1967.

== See also ==
- Substituted tryptamine
