= 5-MeO-DPT =

Psychedelic drug

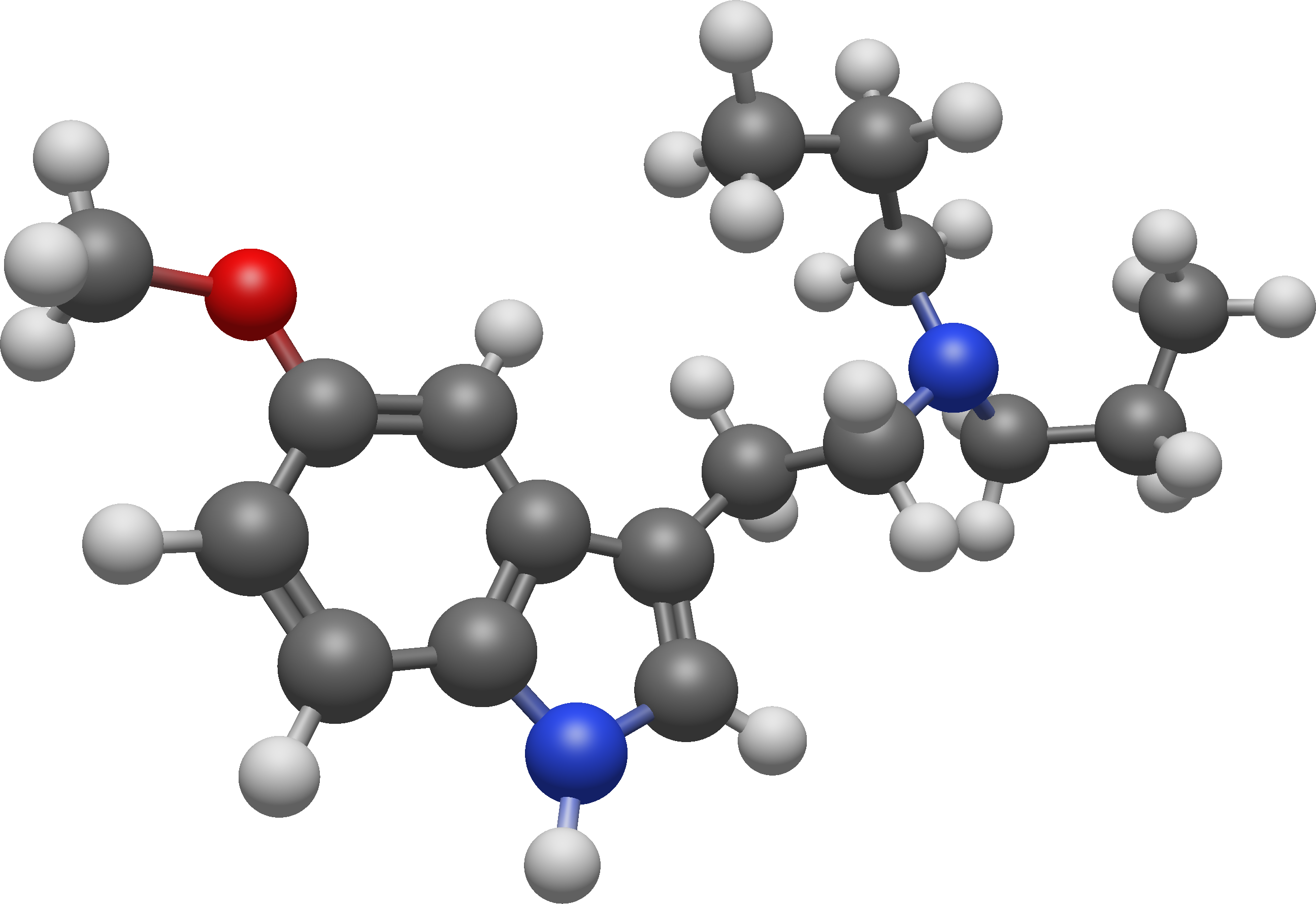

Clinical data
- Other names: 5-Methoxy-N,N-dipropyltryptamine; O-Methyl-N,N-dipropylserotonin; O-Me-DiPS
- Routes of administration: Oral
- Drug class: Serotonin receptor modulator; Serotonin 5-HT_{1A} receptor agonist; Serotonin 5-HT_{2A} receptor agonist; Serotonergic psychedelic; Hallucinogen
- ATC code: None

Legal status
- Legal status: DE: NpSG (Industrial and scientific use only); UK: Class A; US: Schedule I (isomer of 5-MeO-DIPT)

Pharmacokinetic data
- Onset of action: 12 minutes–<1 hour
- Duration of action: 2–4 hours

Identifiers
- IUPAC name: N-[2-(5-methoxy-1H-indol-3-yl)ethyl]-N-propylpropan-1-amine
- CAS Number: 69496-75-9
- PubChem CID: 14011047
- ChemSpider: 14106484
- UNII: AYW60P516B
- ChEMBL: ChEMBL169328
- CompTox Dashboard (EPA): DTXSID70219723

Chemical and physical data
- Formula: C_{17}H_{26}N_{2}O
- Molar mass: 274.408 g·mol^{−1}
- 3D model (JSmol): Interactive image
- Melting point: 193 to 194 °C (379 to 381 °F)
- SMILES: CCCN(CCC)CCc2c[nH]c1ccc(cc12)OC
- InChI: InChI=1S/C17H26N2O/c1-4-9-19(10-5-2)11-8-14-13-18-17-7-6-15(20-3)12-16(14)17/h6-7,12-13,18H,4-5,8-11H2,1-3H3; Key:PNHPVNBKLQWBKH-UHFFFAOYSA-N

5-MeO-DPT, also known as 5-methoxy-N,N-dipropyltryptamine, as well as O-methyl-N,N-dipropylserotonin (O-Me-DiPS), is a psychedelic drug of the tryptamine family related to 5-MeO-DMT. It is taken orally. The drug has been encountered as a novel designer drug.

== Use and effects ==
Alexander Shulgin included 5-MeO-DPT in a subsection in the 5-MeO-DET entry of his book TiHKAL (Tryptamines I Have Known and Loved). He did not explicitly provide a dose range or duration for 5-MeO-DPT, but did report having tried it at doses of 4 to 8.4 mg orally, with 4 mg producing only threshold effects and doses of 6 to 8.4 mg being more meaningfully active. In a subsequent literature review however, Shulgin gave an explicitly defined dose range of 6 to 10 mg orally. Its onset was described as being 12 minutes to within 1 hour and its duration was 2 to 4 hours.

According to Shulgin, 5-MeO-DPT's actions are ambiguous and not totally positive. This led to him tucking discussion of the drug away in the 5-MeO-DET entry of TiHKAL as opposed to giving 5-MeO-DPT its own entry in the book. The effects of 5-MeO-DPT were only vaguely described. The 4 mg dose produced only threshold effects described as "something". At the 6 mg dose, the effects included possible eroticism, not too much lightheadedness, and comfortableness, with a plus-two rating on the Shulgin Rating Scale. On the other hand, at the 8.4 mg dose, there were 5-MeO-DMT-like "head noises" or "bells" described as "bad" and an underlying 5-MeO-DMT-like "turn on" described as "good". However, per Shulgin, while these effects alternated, the unpleasant negative effects overall outweighed the positive and desired effects. There were no apparent cardiovascular effects at this dose. Shulgin stated that he had "better things to do with my time" and did not further explore 5-MeO-DPT or evaluate higher doses.

5-MeO-DPT's lower homologue 5-MeO-DET was found to produce unique and strong side effects such as lightheadedness, dizziness, and vertigo at low doses which precluded it from being tolerated or used at hallucinogenic doses. Shulgin synthesized and tested 5-MeO-DPT in the hopes that the vertigo-related side effects of 5-MeO-DET would be reduced or eliminated while the hallucinogenic and other desired effects such as sexual enhancement would be preserved. However, while 5-MeO-DET-like side effects were not described, Shulgin nonetheless deemed 5-MeO-DPT an unpromising compound.

== Pharmacology ==
=== Pharmacodynamics ===
5-MeO-DPT activities
Target	Affinity (K_{i}, nM)
5-HT_{1A}	4–149 (K_{i}); 2.7–476 (EC_{50}); 43–106% (E_{max})
5-HT_{1B}	1,800–>10,000
5-HT_{1D}	99
5-HT_{1E}	>10,000
5-HT_{2A}	7–655 (K_{i}); 6–684^{a} (EC_{50}); 81^{a}–101% (E_{max})
5-HT_{2B}	33 (K_{i}); 14–29 (EC_{50}); 93–98% (E_{max})
5-HT_{2C}	1,086–1,290 (K_{i}); 810^{a}–1,799 (EC_{50}); 81–112% (E_{max})
5-HT_{3}	>10,000
5-HT_{5A}	>10,000
5-HT_{6}	427
5-HT_{7}	84
KOR	1,211
σ_{1}	279
σ_{2}	491
SERT	1,031–1,284 (K_{i}); 910 (IC_{50})
NET	>10,000 (IC_{50})
DAT	16,998 (IC_{50})
Notes: The smaller the value, the more avidly the drug interacts with the site. Footnotes: ^{a} = Stimulation of IP_{1} formation. Sources:

5-MeO-DPT is a potent and high-efficacy agonist of the serotonin 5-HT_{2A} and 5-HT_{1A} receptors. Additionally, the drug has been found to act as a weak serotonin reuptake inhibitor and serotonin 5-HT_{2C} receptor agonist with lower potency.

The drug fully substitutes for the serotonin 5-HT_{2} receptor agonist and serotonergic psychedelic DOM in rodent drug discrimination tests and partially substitutes for the serotonin 5-HT_{1A} receptor agonist 8-OH-DPAT in these tests followed by behavioral disruption at higher doses. 5-MeO-DPT also substitutes for 5-MeO-DMT in rodent drug discrimination tests.

== Chemistry ==
=== Synthesis ===
The chemical synthesis of 5-MeO-DPT has been described.

=== Analogues ===
Analogues of 5-MeO-DPT include dipropyltryptamine (DPT), 4-HO-DPT (deprocin), 4-AcO-DPT (depracetin), 5-HO-DPT, 5-MeO-DMT, 5-MeO-DET, 5-MeO-DALT, 5-MeO-DBT, 5-MeO-DiPT, 5-MeO-MPT, and 5-MeO-EPT, among others.

== History ==
5-MeO-DPT was first described in the scientific literature by Richard Glennon and colleagues by 1979. It was described in greater detail by Alexander Shulgin in his 1997 book TiHKAL (Tryptamines I Have Known and Loved). The drug was encountered as a novel designer drug in Europe in 2010.

== Society and culture ==
=== Legal status ===
==== Canada ====
5-MeO-DPT is not a controlled substance in Canada as of 2025.

==== United States ====
In the United States, 5-MeO-DPT is considered a Schedule I controlled substance as a positional isomer of 5-MeO-DiPT.

== See also ==
- Substituted tryptamine
