= 5-HO-DPT =

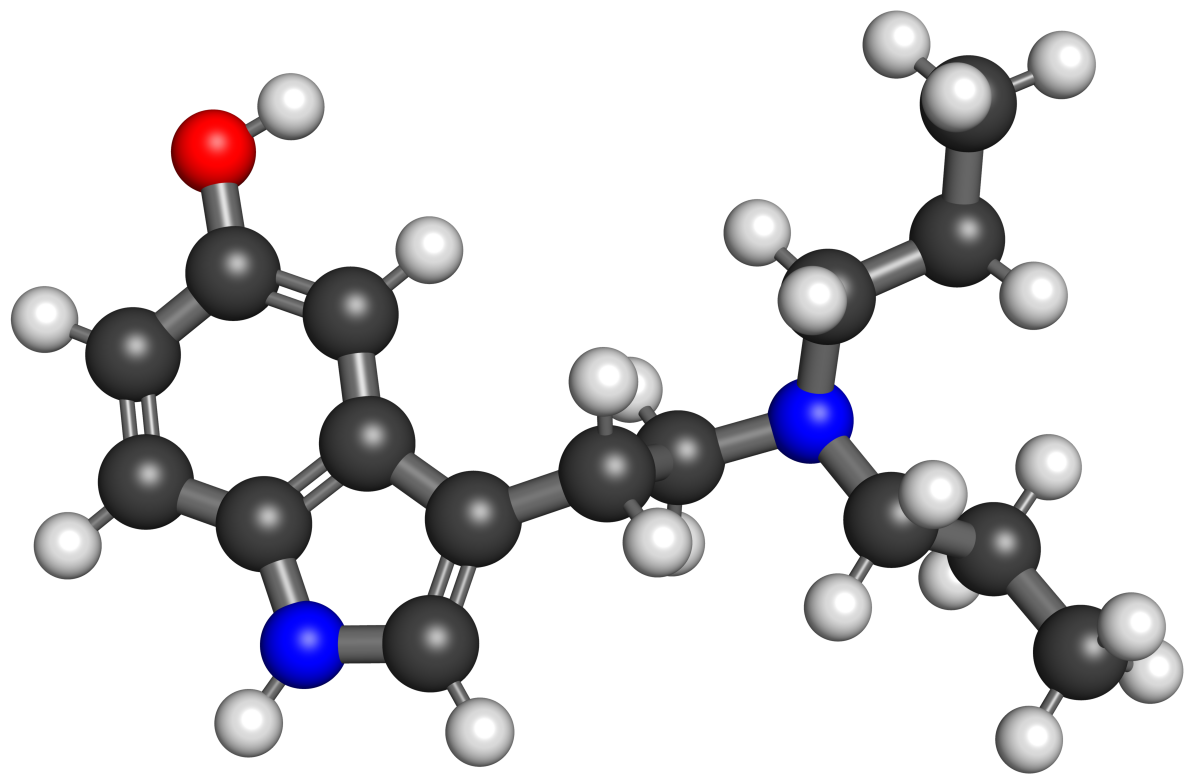

Clinical data
- Other names: 5-Hydroxy-N,N-dipropyltryptamine; N,N-Dipropylserotonin; N,N-Di-n-propylserotonin; DiPS; NDPS
- Drug class: Serotonin receptor modulator
- ATC code: None

Identifiers
- IUPAC name: 3-[2-(dipropylamino)ethyl]-1H-indol-5-ol
- CAS Number: 36288-75-2
- PubChem CID: 169764
- ChemSpider: 148461
- ChEMBL: ChEMBL141706
- CompTox Dashboard (EPA): DTXSID80189827

Chemical and physical data
- Formula: C_{16}H_{24}N_{2}O
- Molar mass: 260.381 g·mol^{−1}
- 3D model (JSmol): Interactive image
- SMILES: CCCN(CCC)CCC1=CNC2=C1C=C(C=C2)O
- InChI: InChI=1S/C16H24N2O/c1-3-8-18(9-4-2)10-7-13-12-17-16-6-5-14(19)11-15(13)16/h5-6,11-12,17,19H,3-4,7-10H2,1-2H3; Key:CWMOGUBWVJQDSL-UHFFFAOYSA-N

5-HO-DPT, also known as 5-hydroxy-N,N-dipropyltryptamine, as well as N,N-dipropylserotonin (DiPS or NDPS), is a serotonin receptor modulator of the tryptamine and 5-hydroxytryptamine families. It is the N,N-dipropyl derivative of serotonin (5-hydroxytryptamine; 5-HT).

== Pharmacology ==
=== Pharmacodynamics ===
5-HO-DPT shows affinity for the serotonin 5-HT_{1A} receptor (K_{i} = 7.1 nM), the serotonin 5-HT_{1B} receptor (K_{i} = 4,300 nM), and the serotonin 5-HT_{2} receptor (K_{i} = 1.0–450 nM). It was a potent serotonin receptor agonist in the rat stomach strip. 5-HO-DPT was not tested itself, but its O-methyl ether 5-MeO-DPT fully substituted for the psychedelic drug DOM in rodent drug discrimination tests and partially substituted for 8-OH-DPAT in these tests followed by behavioral disruption at higher doses.

5-Hydroxytryptamines like bufotenin (5-HO-DMT) are known to be hydrophilic and peripherally selective, in turn resulting in difficulty crossing the blood–brain barrier and exerting central effects. However, 5-HO-DPT is notable in having much greater lipophilicity in comparison to bufotenin owing to its propyl groups (predicted log P = 3.0 and 1.2, respectively).

== Chemistry ==
=== Analogues ===
Analogues of 5-HO-DPT include dipropyltryptamine (DPT), 4-HO-DPT (deprocin), 4-AcO-DPT (depracetin), 5-MeO-DPT, bufotenin (5-HO-DMT), 5-HO-MET, 5-HO-DET, and 5-HO-DiPT, among others.

== History ==
5-HO-DPT was first described in the scientific literature by Richard Glennon and colleagues by 1988.

== See also ==
- Substituted tryptamine
