= ASR-3001 =

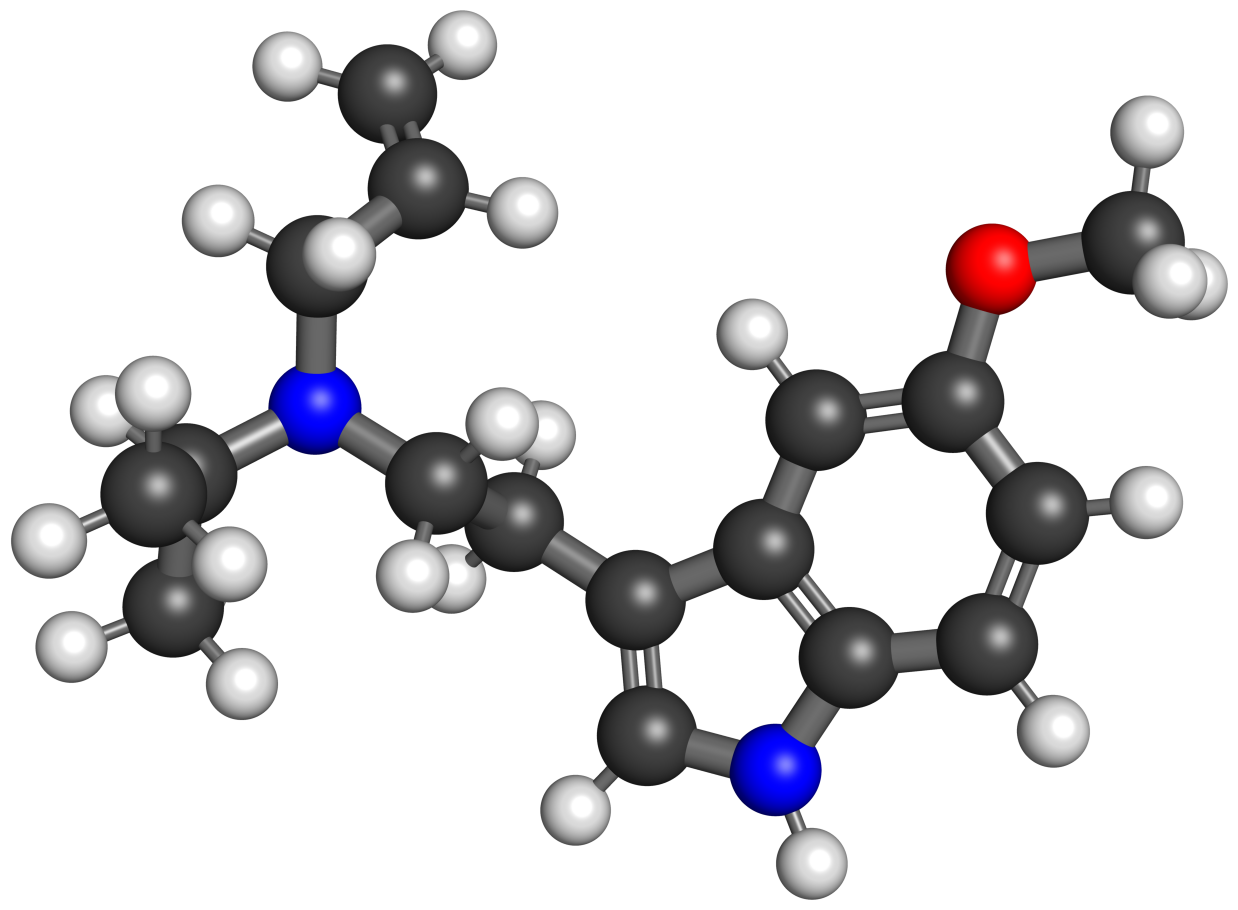

Clinical data
- Other names: ASR3001; 5-MeO-iPALT; 5-MeO-ALiPT; 5-Methoxy-N-isopropyl-N-allyltryptamine; 5-Methoxy-N-allyl-N-isopropyltryptamine
- Routes of administration: Oral
- Drug class: Serotonin receptor agonist; Serotonin 5-HT_{2A} receptor agonist; Serotonergic psychedelic; Hallucinogen
- ATC code: None

Legal status
- Legal status: In general Unscheduled

Pharmacokinetic data
- Onset of action: ≤15 minutes (as fast as 6–8 minutes)
- Duration of action: 1.5–2.5 hours

Identifiers
- IUPAC name: N-[2-(5-methoxy-1H-indol-3-yl)ethyl]-N-prop-2-enylpropan-2-amine
- CAS Number: 2915652-51-4
- PubChem CID: 166468733

Chemical and physical data
- Formula: C_{17}H_{24}N_{2}O
- Molar mass: 272.392 g·mol^{−1}
- 3D model (JSmol): Interactive image
- SMILES: CC(C)N(CCC1=CNC2=C1C=C(C=C2)OC)CC=C
- InChI: InChI=1S/C17H24N2O/c1-5-9-19(13(2)3)10-8-14-12-18-17-7-6-15(20-4)11-16(14)17/h5-7,11-13,18H,1,8-10H2,2-4H3; Key:MRWWDVFDOFUYKB-UHFFFAOYSA-N

ASR-3001, also known as 5-methoxy-N-isopropyl-N-allyltryptamine (5-MeO-iPALT), is a serotonin receptor agonist and serotonergic psychedelic of the tryptamine and 5-methoxytryptamine families which is under development for the treatment of psychiatric disorders. It is a close analogue of related psychedelic tryptamines like 5-MeO-DALT, 5-MeO-DiPT, and 5-MeO-MiPT. The drug is taken orally.

== Use and effects ==
ASR-3001 is said to be orally active, fast- and short-acting, and to induce "an internal psychedelic cognitive state [or head space] with little or no sensory [or visual] involvement". More specifically, it is said to have an absence of open-eye and closed-eye visuals. These properties are expected to allow ASR-3001 to serve as a potential "entry point" for people reluctant to undergo a fully immersive psychedelic experience that includes visuals. ASR-3001 is said to be internally psychedelic as opposed to entactogenic. Its dose range is 8 to 14 mg (or perhaps up to 10 mg), its onset is within 15 minutes or as fast as 6 to 8 minutes, and its duration is short at about 1.5 to 2.5 hours (90–150 minutes). Along with 4-HO-DiPT, it appears to be one of the shortest-acting oral psychedelics known.

== Pharmacology ==
=== Pharmacodynamics ===
ASR-3001 acts as a non-selective agonist of the serotonin receptors. This includes of the serotonin 5-HT_{2A}, 5-HT_{2B}, 5-HT_{1A}, 5-HT_{1B}, and 5-HT_{6} receptors, whereas other serotonin receptors, such as the serotonin 5-HT_{2C} receptor, were not described. Its EC_{50} values were 9.85 nM at the serotonin 5-HT_{2A} receptor, 46.8 nM at the serotonin 5-HT_{1B} receptor, 87.4 nM at the serotonin 5-HT_{2B} receptor, 420 nM at the serotonin 5-HT_{6} receptor, and 642 nM at the serotonin 5-HT_{1A} receptor. The drug was also a very weak serotonin reuptake inhibitor (IC_{50} = 6,840 nM), but did not inhibit norepinephrine or dopamine reuptake. It showed little or no activity at various other sites as well.

ASR-3001 has been found to produce the head-twitch response, a behavioral proxy of psychedelic effects, in rodents, with an ED_{50} of 0.45 mg/kg in mice.

== Chemistry ==
=== Synthesis ===
The chemical synthesis of ASR-3001 has been described.

=== Analogues ===
Analogues of ASR-3001 (5-MeO-iPALT) include isopropylallyltryptamine (iPALT; ASR-3003), 5-MeO-DMT, 5-MeO-DiPT, 5-MeO-DALT, 5-MeO-MiPT, 5-MeO-EiPT, 5-MeO-PiPT, 5-MeO-MALT, and 5-MeO-EPT, among others. Other analogues include ASR-3002 (2-Me-iPALT), and ASR-3004 (PALT), among others.

== History ==
ASR-3001 was first described by 2023 and was patented the same year.

== Society and culture ==
=== Legal status ===
==== Canada ====
ASR-3001 is not an explicitly nor implicitly controlled substance in Canada as of 2025.

==== United States ====
ASR-3001 is not an explicitly controlled substance in the United States. However, it could be considered a controlled substance under the Federal Analogue Act if intended for human consumption.

== Research ==
ASR-3001 is under development by the Nicholas V. Cozzi and Paul F. Daley and colleagues at the Alexander Shulgin Research Institute (ASRI). As of early 2025, it is in the preclinical research stage of development. The drug is the ASRI's most advanced developmental candidate.

== See also ==
- Substituted tryptamine
- List of investigational hallucinogens and entactogens
- ASR-2001 (2CB-5PrO)
- 2C-T-17 and MiPT
