= DiPT =

Psychedelic drug

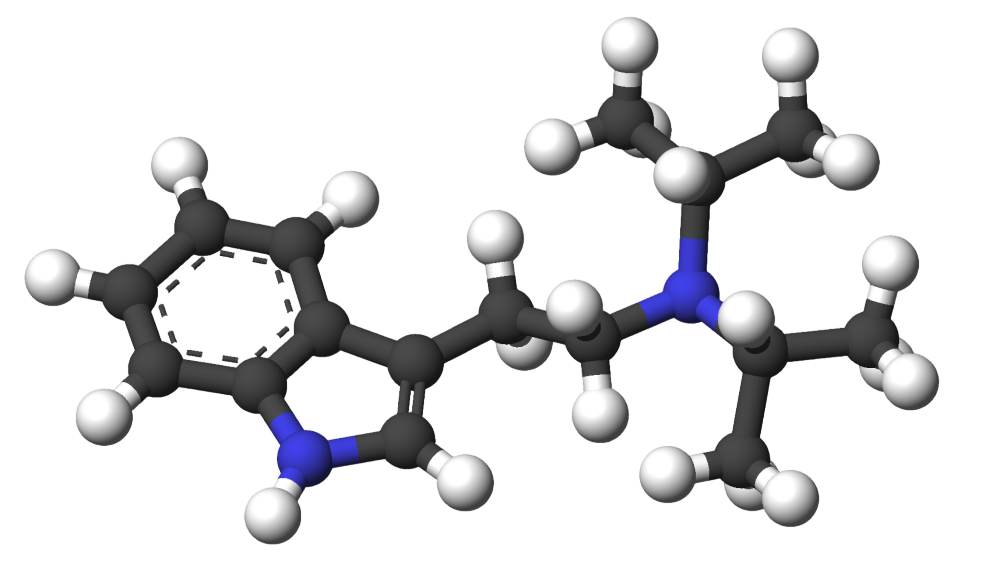

Clinical data
- Pronunciation: /ˌdaɪˌaɪsoʊˌproʊpɪlˈtrɪptəmiːn/
- Other names: Diisopropyltryptamine; N,N-Diisopropyltryptamine; DiPT; DIPT; Dipt; Dipsy
- Routes of administration: Oral, smoking
- Drug class: Serotonin receptor agonist; Serotonin 5-HT_{2A} receptor agonist; Serotonergic psychedelic; Hallucinogen
- ATC code: None

Legal status
- Legal status: AU: Unscheduled; CA: Unscheduled; DE: NpSG (Industrial and scientific use only); UK: Class A; US: Unscheduled; UN: Unscheduled

Pharmacokinetic data
- Onset of action: Oral: 20 minutes–1 hour Smoking: 4–8 minutes
- Duration of action: 4–8 hours

Identifiers
- IUPAC name: N-[2-(1H-indol-3-yl)ethyl]-N-propan-2-ylpropan-2-amine
- CAS Number: 14780-24-6
- PubChem CID: 26903
- ChemSpider: 25060
- UNII: E352B01VMH
- ChEBI: CHEBI:48286
- CompTox Dashboard (EPA): DTXSID80163804

Chemical and physical data
- Formula: C_{16}H_{24}N_{2}
- Molar mass: 244.382 g·mol^{−1}
- 3D model (JSmol): Interactive image
- SMILES: CC(C)N(CCC1=CNC2=CC=CC=C21)C(C)C
- InChI: InChI=1S/C16H24N2/c1-12(2)18(13(3)4)10-9-14-11-17-16-8-6-5-7-15(14)16/h5-8,11-13,17H,9-10H2,1-4H3; Key:ZRVAAGAZUWXRIP-UHFFFAOYSA-N

Diisopropyltryptamine (DiPT), also known as N,N-diisopropyltryptamine, is a psychedelic drug of the tryptamine family related to dimethyltryptamine (DMT). It is unusual among psychedelics in that at usual doses it primarily or exclusively produces strong auditory changes, including decreased pitch, harmonic distortion, and sound unfamiliarity, but produces no other hallucinogenic effects such as visuals. However, the drug may produce more classically psychedelic effects at very high doses. It is taken orally, but can also be smoked.

The drug acts as a serotonin receptor agonist, including of the serotonin 5-HT_{2A}, 5-HT_{2B}, and 5-HT_{2C} receptors. It has weak activity at the serotonin 5-HT_{1A} receptor. DiPT does not appear to bind to the serotonin 5-HT_{6} receptor or to several other serotonin receptors. It produces psychedelic-like effects in animals, which appear to be mediated primarily by serotonin 5-HT_{2A} receptor activation. The mechanisms by which DiPT produces selective auditory changes are unknown. Derivatives of DiPT include 4-HO-DiPT (iprocin) and 5-MeO-DiPT (foxy methoxy), among others.

DiPT was first described in the scientific literature by 1959. The basic properties of DiPT in humans were described by Alexander Shulgin in 1976 and its effects were described in detail by Shulgin in subsequent publications in the 1980s and in his 1997 book TiHKAL (Tryptamines I Have Known and Loved). DiPT was encountered as a novel designer drug in 2005. However, it appears to be little-used recreationally compared to other psychedelic drugs, perhaps due to its unusual effects.

== Use and effects ==
In his book TiHKAL (Tryptamines I Have Known and Loved) and other publications, Alexander Shulgin lists DiPT's dose range as 25 to 100 mg orally and its duration as 6 to 8 hours. In other publications however, he variably gives an effective dose range of 20 to 50 mg orally, a dose range of 40 to 100 mg orally, and a listed dose of 80 mg orally, as well as a shorter duration of 4 hours at lower doses and 5 hours at a higher dose. Per Shulgin, the full spectrum of effects of DiPT occur at a dose of 50 mg, while a dose of 80 mg has the same activity as a 50 mg dose and only results in an intensification of these effects. A wider recreational dose range for DiPT of 15 to 150 mg or more orally has also been reported, with a typical dose estimate of about 50 mg. According to Shulgin, testing of DiPT started at a dose of 0.5 mg and gradually titrated up in 9 human volunteers, with threshold effects occurring at a dose of 16 mg orally. There was also a report of 250 mg orally in TiHKAL, with apparently very strong effects. The onset of DiPT is 20 to 30 minutes or up to 1 hour, peak effects occur after 1.5 to 2 hours, and full effects last for 1 to 2 hours. In addition to oral administration, TiHKAL included a report of 8 mg DiPT smoked, with an onset of 4 to 8 minutes and a plus-two rating on the Shulgin Rating Scale.

In major contrast to most other known serotonergic psychedelics, which are primarily visual in their effects, the effects of DiPT are unusual in that they are primarily or exclusively auditory. It is said to produce remarkable and extraordinary changes to sound perception, for instance of voices and music. DiPT reduces the perceived pitch (frequency) of sounds, causing an unusual tonal shift of all frequencies to a lower pitch. It also causes distortion of pitch as well as of the timbre (tone quality) of sounds. As an example of its effects on pitch, DiPT makes peoples' voices sound much lower or deeper, like women's voices being heard in bass tones or peoples' voices sound as if they have a bad cold. Voices are said to sound very similar to a single side-band radio signal being mistuned to the low side of the center frequency. Despite these changes however, there were no effects on clarity of speech, and speech comprehension and interpretation were described as normal.

DiPT makes music sound out of key and completely disharmonious, for instance piano playing sounding like a "bar-room disaster". However, single tones were said to sound normal aside from pitch changes. DiPT does not cause a simple, linear, or proportional decrease in pitch, but decreases pitch by a fixed value. As a result, proportionality is lost, in turn resulting in complete harmonic distortion, jarring distortions of harmonic intervals, and music feeling qualitatively "wrong". An analogy given for this was someone having their thumb on an LP record and making everything come out at a 50 to 75% speed. In terms of other sounds, telephone ringing sounds "partly underwater" with DiPT. The drug causes abrupt sounds to have "golden spikes" attached to them as "after-sounds". DiPT was reported to cause all familiar sounds to become foreign, even the mere chewing of food. Sounds are said to be perceived as amplified or more intense and there is said to be a decrease in high-frequency acuity. The auditory and harmonic distortion with DiPT is described as intense or extreme, even at relatively low doses like 40 mg orally. There is said to be variability between individuals in terms of the auditory effects of DiPT.

Shulgin felt that DiPT could potentially be a useful tool in scientific research on the auditory system. He speculated that it might be able to help locate the pitch center of the brain, for instance if used in positron emission tomography (PET) imaging. A small study involving DiPT administered to two people with perfect pitch was conducted and findings shared with Shulgin. It assessed whether there was some relationship between a note's pitch and the perceived pitch of the note. No meaningful relationship was found, except reinforcement of the notion that the pitch decrease with DiPT is not linear and that there is true distortion instead of a simple pitch drop. Interestingly, the plot of the error for each note against elapsed time provided an almost-quantitative measurement of DiPT's intensity and time-course of effects. In the same study, pre-treatment with low doses of MDMA resulted in exaggeration of auditory distortion with DiPT, including an enhanced sound intensity that verged on being painful. Aside from research on the auditory system, there has also been interest in DiPT in the study of music and language processing.

In terms of its psychedelic-type effects, DiPT is said to produce only auditory changes. One report observed auditory changes but no effects whatsoever in a quiet environment. The subject remarked that if they were deaf, they would have assumed that DiPT was an inactive compound. The drug is specifically said to produce no visual changes at all or that visual effects with it are non-existent. Accordingly, there was no visual distortion with DiPT at any time and there was no closed-eye imagery. The drug is said to lack the intense sensory disturbances or hallucinogenic effects characteristic of other psychedelics like dimethyltryptamine (DMT) and psilocybin. Relatedly, DiPT produces no changes in vision, taste, or smell. Additionally, it is said to produce little to no euphoria. Moreover, its experience was described as passive and neutral rather than as pleasant or unpleasant, or that it had a somewhat neutral–negative response. Because of its lack of classical psychedelic-like effects, some authors have gone so far as to conclude that DiPT "distorts auditory perception and does not produce psychedelic effects". Aside from hallucinogenic-related effects, DiPT is said to produce lethargy and a desire to lie down and remain that way, which are particularly prominent during the peak. It is also reported to cause distance between oneself and one's surroundings and/or feelings, with these effects neither being disturbing nor stimulating. Owing to its selective auditory effects, the outcomes of DiPT experiences may be less dependent on set and setting than those of other psychedelics.

The drug is said to be relatively free of autonomic side effects and toxicity indications. There are no changes in vital signs or motor coordination, although it was reported to cause handwriting impairment. It causes slight ear pressure as if the eustachian tubes are clogged. DiPT is also anecdotally claimed to produce tinnitus as a side effect. In addition, it causes mild diarrhea, mild nausea, muscular hyperreflexia, and slight pupil dilation. There were no changes in appetite and no sleep disruption.

Although DiPT produces selective auditory effects at typical doses, it appears to produce effects more similar to those of classical serotonergic psychedelics like LSD at higher doses. For example, in one report in TiHKAL that employed DiPT at a very high dose of 250 mg orally, the person described being spoken to and reassured by a "spirit", a feeling of foreboding, that "the light was there" but that DiPT was the "body of Satan", that they felt like they had been sent to an "anti-universe" where everything looked the same as normal but was a cold and empty imitation, and that they felt like a "fallen angel". In addition to these effects, the person reported very strong auditory effects, such as mens' voices sounding like frogs and children sounding like they were speaking through synthesizers to imitate outer-space people in science-fiction movies. While DiPT may be able to produce more classically psychedelic effects at high doses, the precise effective dose range for these effects is not well-defined.

Other tryptamines reported to cause DiPT-esque sound distortion have included 2-methyl-DMT, 2-methyl-DET, and 5-MeO-DiPT. Conversely, auditory changes or distortions with other psychedelics, including DMT, diethyltryptamine (DET), and ethylisopropyltryptamine (EiPT), among many others, are described as mild, rare, or absent. Similarly, auditory changes were not mentioned with methylisopropyltryptamine (MiPT) or 5-MeO-MiPT, except that these drugs produced enhanced auditory acuity and sound discrimination. Although both DiPT and 5-MeO-DiPT can produce notable changes in auditory perception, DiPT's effects in general are said to differ from those of 5-MeO-DiPT's in most respects. Moreover, 5-MeO-DiPT was reported to cause "some" musical sound distortion, specifically in terms of musical character and interpretation, but there were no apparent changes to harmonic structure in contrast to DiPT. Shulgin speculated that 2-methyl-DiPT could be an interesting compound in terms of attempting to develop another psychedelic specifically affecting the auditory system, but he did not synthesize or test it.

== Pharmacology ==
=== Pharmacodynamics ===
DiPT activities
Target	Affinity (K_{i}, nM)
5-HT_{1A}	121–2,270 (K_{i}); 4,570–>10,000 (EC_{50}); 58% (E_{max})
5-HT_{1B}	>10,000
5-HT_{1D}	3,742
5-HT_{1E}	>10,000
5-HT_{1F}	ND
5-HT_{2A}	1,200–>10,000 (K_{i}); 34–>10,000 (EC_{50}); 81–117% (E_{max})
5-HT_{2B}	399 (K_{i}); 1,000–2,380 (EC_{50}); 103–107% (E_{max})
5-HT_{2C}	290–>10,000 (K_{i}); 167–1,999 (EC_{50}); 81–143% (E_{max})
5-HT_{3}	>10,000
5-HT_{4}	ND
5-HT_{5A}	>10,000
5-HT_{6}	>10,000
5-HT_{7}	3,423
α_{1A}, α_{1B}	>10,000
α_{1D}	ND
α_{2A}	3,600–>10,000
α_{2B}	2,870
α_{2C}	2,523
β_{1}, β_{2}	>10,000
β_{3}	ND
D_{1}, D_{2}	>25,000
D_{3}	3,321–>25,000
D_{4}, D_{5}	>10,000
H_{1}	920–3,583
H_{2}	>10,000
H_{3}	ND
H_{4}	>10,000
M_{1}–M_{5}	>10,000
I_{1}	356
σ_{1}	1,798
σ_{2}	2,702
TAAR1	>15,000 (K_{i}) (mouse) >15,000 (K_{i}) (rat); ND (EC_{50}) (mouse); ND (EC_{50}) (rat); ND (EC_{50}) (human); ND (E_{max}) (mouse); ND (E_{max}) (rat)
SERT	180–1,258 (K_{i}); 215–900 (IC_{50}); IA (EC_{50})
NET	8,900–>10,000 (K_{i}); 9,900–>10,000 (IC_{50}); IA (EC_{50})
DAT	4,100–>10,000 (K_{i}); 4,788–35,000 (IC_{50}); IA (EC_{50})
Notes: The smaller the value, the more avidly the drug binds to the site. All proteins are human unless otherwise specified. Refs:

DiPT binds to serotonin receptors including the serotonin 5-HT_{1A}, 5-HT_{2A}, 5-HT_{2B}, 5-HT_{2C} receptors among others. It is known to act as a full agonist of the serotonin 5-HT_{2A}, 5-HT_{2B}, and 5-HT_{2C} receptors. The drug has weak activity at the serotonin 5-HT_{1A} receptor. It is also a weak serotonin reuptake inhibitor. In contrast to many related drugs, DiPT does not interact with the rodent or human trace amine-associated receptor 1 (TAAR1).

DiPT fully substitutes for dimethyltryptamine (DMT) and DOM and partially substitutes for LSD in rodent drug discrimination tests. Conversely, it does not substitute for cocaine, methamphetamine, or MDMA. When DiPT is used as the training drug, LSD, DOM, and MDMA fully substitute for DiPT while DMT only partially substitutes for DiPT and methamphetamine fails to substitute. Its stimulus properties in drug discrimination tests are partially blocked by the serotonin 5-HT_{2A} receptor antagonist volinanserin and by the serotonin 5-HT_{2C} receptor antagonist SB-242084. This is in contrast to the case of the related psychedelic DMT, wherein volinanserin fully blocks its stimulus properties and SB-242084 has minimal influence. Nonetheless, it was concluded that the serotonin 5-HT_{2A} receptor primarily mediates the interoceptive effects of DiPT in rodents. Besides serotonin receptors, the metabotropic glutamate mGlu_{2} and mGlu_{3} receptor agonist LY-379268 had minimal effects on the stimulus properties of DiPT, whereas the mGlu_{2} and mGlu_{3} receptor antagonist LY-341495 potentiated DiPT discrimination.

Similarly to DMT and other psychedelics, DiPT produces the head-twitch response, a behavioral proxy of psychedelic-like effects, in rodents, and this effect is blocked by volinanserin. In addition, DiPT produces hypolocomotion. The drug also produces convulsions at high doses in rodents.

The unique auditory effects of DiPT in humans have not yet been properly evaluated or demonstrated in animals.

Unusually among most psychedelics, DiPT did not show evidence of behavioral tolerance in rodents.

== Chemistry ==
DiPT, also known as N,N-diisopropyltryptamine, is a derivative of tryptamine formed by substituting isopropyl groups for the two hydrogen atoms attached to the non-aromatic nitrogen atom in the tryptamine molecule.

=== Synthesis ===
The chemical synthesis of DiPT has been described.

=== Analogues ===
Analogues of DiPT include dimethyltryptamine (DMT), diethyltryptamine (DET), dipropyltryptamine (DPT), diallyltryptamine (DALT), 5-MeO-DiPT, 4-HO-DiPT (iprocin), 5-HO-DiPT, 4-AcO-DiPT (ipracetin), 2-methyl-DiPT, 4,5-MDO-DiPT, 5,6-MDO-DiPT, methylisopropyltryptamine (MiPT), ethylisopropyltryptamine (EiPT), and propylisopropyltryptamine (PiPT), among others.

== History ==
DiPT was first described in the scientific literature by R. B. Barlow and colleagues by 1959. Alexander Shulgin disclosed the basic properties of DiPT in humans in 1976 based on unpublished findings of his cited to 1974. Subsequently, Shulgin described DiPT, along with 5-MeO-DiPT, in much greater detail in a 1980 journal article. He also described it in further detail in other articles published in the 1980s, as well as in his 1997 book TiHKAL (Tryptamines I Have Known and Loved).

DiPT was encountered as a novel designer drug in Europe in 2005. However, it appears to be relatively little used recreationally compared to other psychedelic drugs. This may be related to its unusual effects, including lacking the typical recreational effects associated with psychedelic drugs. Hamilton Morris and Jason Wallach have intensively studied DiPT for over a decade at the University of the Sciences's Philadelphia College of Pharmacy. This has included synthesis of numerous DiPT derivatives. A literature review on DiPT and its unique auditory effects, termed diptogenia, was published in 2026.

== Society and culture ==
=== Legal status ===
==== Canada ====
DiPT is not a controlled substance in Canada as of 2025.

==== United Kingdom ====
As is the case with many psychedelic tryptamines and phenethylamines, it is Class A in the UK, making it illegal to possess or use.

==== United States ====
DiPT is not scheduled at the federal level in the United States, but it could be considered an analog of 5-MeO-DiPT, in which case purchase, sale, or possession for human consumption or illicit use that is not for scientific or industrial purposes could be prosecuted under the Federal Analog Act. Some of the people arrested in Operation Web Tryp were selling DiPT, however the drug is not explicitly forbidden or outlawed.

However the US Drug Enforcement Agency (DEA) withdrew a proposal to ban five psychedelic substances including 4-Hydroxy-N,N-diisopropyltryptamine (4-OH-DiPT), N-Isopropyl-5-Methoxy-N-Methyltryptamine (5-MeO-MiPT) and N,N-Diisopropyltryptamine (DiPT). DEA withdrew the proposed listing as schedule 1 banned substance after a public hearing in 2022.

===== Florida =====
"DiPT (N,N-Diisopropyltryptamine)" is a Schedule I controlled substance in the state of Florida making it illegal to buy, sell, or possess in Florida.

===== Arizona =====
"DiPT (N,N-Diisopropyltryptamine)" is designated as a "Dangerous drug" in the state of Arizona making it illegal to buy, sell, Manufacture, or possess in Arizona.

==== Sweden ====
Sweden's public health agency suggested classifying DiPT as a hazardous substance, on May 15, 2019.

== See also ==
- Substituted tryptamine
