= 5-MeO-DALT =

Chemical compound

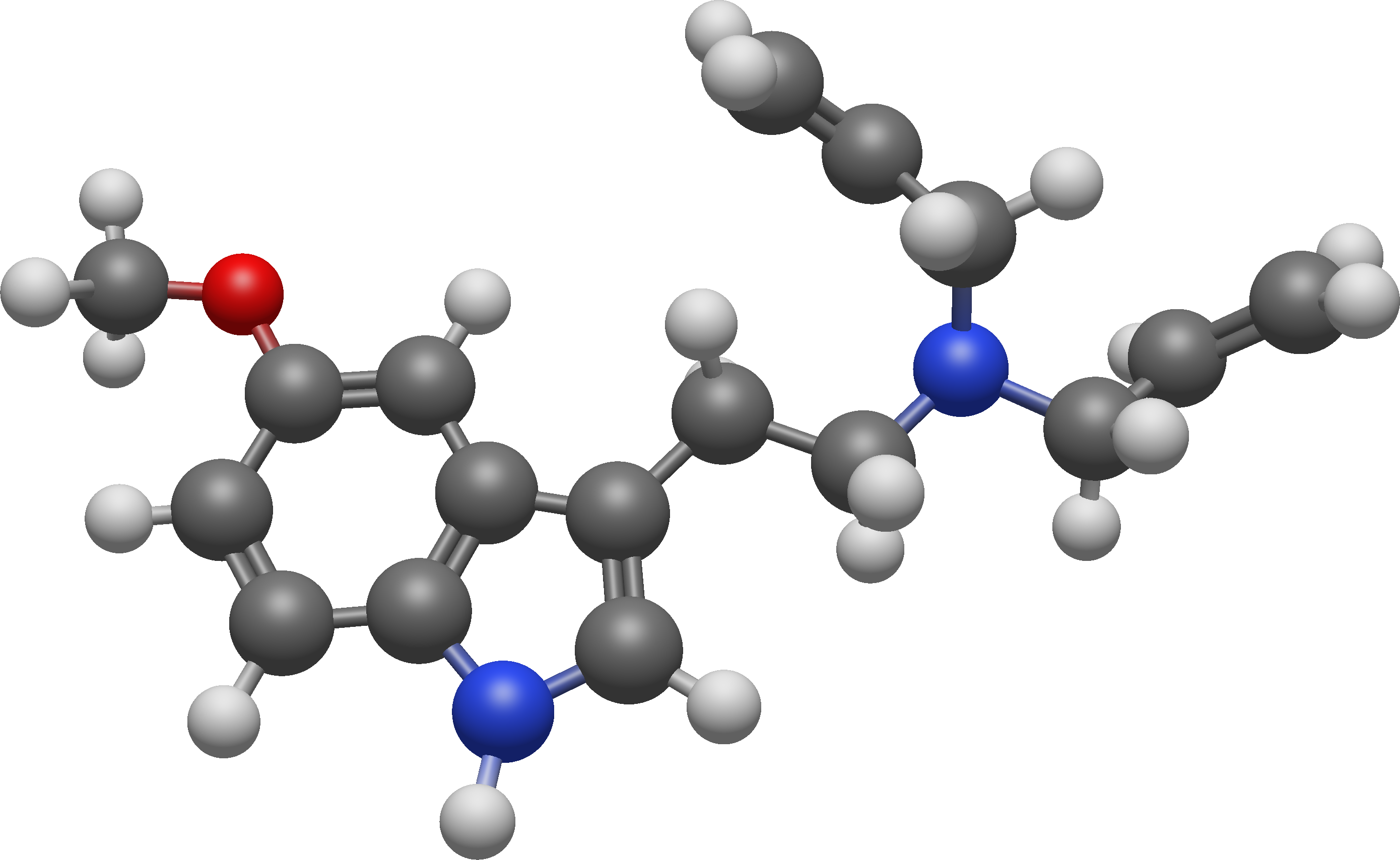

Clinical data
- Trade names: Foxtrot
- Other names: N,N-Diallyl-5-methoxytryptamine; 5-Methoxy-N,N-diallyltryptamine; 5-Methoxy-DALT; Foxtrot
- Routes of administration: Oral
- Drug class: Serotonin receptor agonist; Serotonergic psychedelic; Hallucinogen

Legal status
- Legal status: BR: Class F2 (Prohibited psychotropics); DE: NpSG (Industrial and scientific use only); UK: Class A; UN: Unscheduled.; In general unscheduled and not approved for human consumption, Illegal in China, Japan, Singapore, Sweden, Florida and Louisiana

Pharmacokinetic data
- Onset of action: <10–15 minutes
- Duration of action: 1–4 hours

Identifiers
- IUPAC name: N-[2-(5-methoxy-1H-indol-3-yl)ethyl]-N-(prop-2-en-1-yl)prop-2-en-1-amine
- CAS Number: 928822-98-4
- PubChem CID: 50878551
- ChemSpider: 21106245
- UNII: V25VK0QTAA
- KEGG: C22723
- ChEMBL: ChEMBL2391541
- CompTox Dashboard (EPA): DTXSID30239169

Chemical and physical data
- Formula: C_{17}H_{22}N_{2}O
- Molar mass: 270.376 g·mol^{−1}
- 3D model (JSmol): Interactive image
- SMILES: C=CCN(CCC1=CNC2=C1C=C(OC)C=C2)CC=C
- InChI: InChI=1S/C17H22N2O/c1-4-9-19(10-5-2)11-8-14-13-18-17-7-6-15(20-3)12-16(14)17/h4-7,12-13,18H,1-2,8-11H2,3H3; Key:HGRHWEAUHXYNNP-UHFFFAOYSA-N

5-MeO-DALT, also known as N,N-diallyl-5-methoxytryptamine or as foxtrot, is a psychedelic drug of the tryptamine and 5-methoxytryptamine families. It is taken orally.

5-MeO-DALT was first synthesized and described by Alexander Shulgin, who disclosed the compound in 2004. It has been encountered as a novel designer and recreational drug.

== Use and effects ==
According to Alexander Shulgin in a follow-up entry to his book TiHKAL (Tryptamines I Have Known and Loved), the dose of 5-MeO-DALT is 12 to 20 mg orally and its duration is 2 to 4 hours. A wider dose range of 12 to 25 mg has also been reported. It is said to onset and peak remarkably quickly via the oral route, with an onset of less than 10 to 15 minutes and a time to peak of 30 minutes. The effects of 5-MeO-DALT were reported to include positive emotional changes, lightheadedness, increased appreciation of music and sex, and closed-eye visuals. There was said to be a lack of open-eye visuals and it was said to be relatively light in psychedelic character. Later, the Alexander Shulgin Research Institute (ASRI) described 5-MeO-DALT's duration as being only approximately 1.0 to 1.5 hours and that it produced mild inebriation at doses of up to 50 to 60 mg orally. In addition, they described its effects as being transient and pleasant but not very impactful.

== Overdose ==
There is little published literature on the toxicity of 5-MeO-DALT. Case reports of overdose have been published, with effects including loss of consciousness, visual hallucinations, acute delirium, and rhabdomyolysis, among others. A death related to behavioral intoxication has been reported.

== Pharmacology ==
=== Pharmacodynamics ===
5-MeO-DALT activities
Target	Affinity (K_{i}, nM)
5-HT_{1A}	3.26–48 (K_{i}); 2.9–3.4 (EC_{50}); 99–102% (E_{max})
5-HT_{1B}	551–735
5-HT_{1D}	53–107
5-HT_{1E}	322–1,660
5-HT_{1F}	ND
5-HT_{2A}	48–309 (K_{i}); 8.4–139.4 (EC_{50}); 91–114% (E_{max})
5-HT_{2B}	45–110 (K_{i}); 18–33 (EC_{50}); 86–90% (E_{max})
5-HT_{2C}	456–2,399 (K_{i}); 75–299^{a} (EC_{50}); 88–99%^{a} (E_{max})
5-HT_{3}	>10,000
5-HT_{4}	ND
5-HT_{5A}	3,312–>10,000
5-HT_{6}	87–153
5-HT_{7}	60–90
α_{1A}–α_{1D}	>10,000
α_{2A}	215–468
α_{2B}	726–956
α_{2C}	641–1,467
β_{1}–β_{3}	>10,000
D_{1}–D_{2}	>10,000
D_{3}	699–708
D_{4}	6,310
D_{5}	>10,000
H_{1}	505–1,514
H_{2}	4,250–>10,000
H_{3}	2,820 (human); 1,712 (guinea pig)
H_{4}	>10,000
M_{1}–M_{5}	>10,000
nACh	>10,000
I_{1}	ND
σ_{1}	333–562 (human); 301–398 (rodent)
σ_{2}	340–776 (human); 253 (rat)
TAAR1	ND
MOR, DOR	>10,000
KOR	899–>10,000
SERT	499–33,884 (K_{i}) >100,000 (IC_{50}) (rat); 930–22,313 (IC_{50}) (human) >100,000 (EC_{50}) (rat)
NET	>10,000 (K_{i}) >100,000 (IC_{50}) (rat) >100,000 (EC_{50}) (rat)
DAT	3,378 (K_{i}) >100,000 (IC_{50}) (rat) >100,000 (EC_{50}) (rat)
Notes: The smaller the value, the more avidly the drug binds to the site. All proteins are human unless otherwise specified. Footnotes: ^{a} = Stimulation of IP_{1} formation. Refs:

The interactions of 5-MeO-DALT with various targets have been reported. It binds to a variety of serotonin receptors, as well as a number of other targets. The drug is a potent full agonist of the serotonin 5-HT_{1A} and 5-HT_{2A} receptors. It is also an agonist of the serotonin 5-HT_{2B} and 5-HT_{2C} receptors.

Uniquely the substance displayed weak agonist-like activity at the μ-opioid (MOR) and δ-opioid receptors (DOR) along with more significant activity at the κ-opioid receptor (KOR) (~76% of salvinorin A at 1 μM concentration) with G protein bias over β-arrestin activation.

Similarly to other psychedelics, 5-MeO-DALT produces the head-twitch response, a behavioral proxy of psychedelic-like effects, in rodents. The drug fully substitutes for the serotonergic psychedelic DOM in rodent drug discrimination tests. Conversely, 5-MeO-DALT does not substitute for the entactogen MDMA in such tests. 5-MeO-DALT produces dose-dependent hyperlocomotion in rodents, followed by hypolocomotion at the highest assessed dose. This is in contrast to many other psychedelic tryptamines, which tend to produce only hypolocomotion. 5-MeO-DMT and 5-MeO-AMT are locomotor depressants, whereas 5-MeO-DET and 5-MeO-MiPT are mixed locomotor stimulants/depressants similarly to 5-MeO-DALT. It also produces hypothermia.

The head-twitch response induced by 5-MeO-DALT in rodents was found to be positively related to its serotonin 5-HT_{2A} receptor affinity and negatively related to its serotonin 5-HT_{1A} receptor affinity. In relation to this, multiple targets appear to contribute to the effects of 5-MeO-DALT.

=== Pharmacokinetics ===
The metabolism and cytochrome P450 inhibition of 5-MeO-DALT has been described in scientific literature.

== Chemistry ==
The full name of the chemical is N-allyl-N-[2-(5-methoxy-1H-indol-3-yl)ethyl] prop-2-en-1- amine. It is related to the compounds 5-MeO-DPT, DALT, 4-HO-DALT, and 4-AcO-DALT.

=== Synthesis ===
The chemical synthesis of 5-MeO-DALT has been described.

=== Crystal structure ===
In April 2020, Chadeayne et al. solved the crystal structure of the freebase form of 5-MeO-DALT.

=== Analogues ===
Analogues of 5-MeO-DALT include diallyltryptamine (DALT), 4-HO-DALT (daltocin), 4-AcO-DALT (dalcetin), NB-5-MeO-DALT, 5-MeO-DMT, 5-MeO-DET, 5-MeO-DPT, 5-MeO-DiPT, 5-MeO-MALT, 5-MeO-MiPT, and 5-MeO-iPALT (ASR-3001), among others.

== History ==
The first material regarding the synthesis and effects of 5-MeO-DALT was sent from Alexander Shulgin to a research associate named Murple in May 2004, after which it was circulated online. In June 2004 5-MeO-DALT became available from internet research chemical vendors after being synthesized by commercial laboratories in China. In August 2004 the synthesis and effects of 5-MeO-DALT were published by Erowid. Shulgin has stated that 5-MeO-DALT had not previously existed in the scientific literature. 5-MeO-DALT was not included in the original published version of TiHKAL, but an entry for the compound was subsequently written and released in 2004. The drug was encountered as a novel designer drug by at least 2006.

== Society and culture ==
=== Legal status ===
==== Canada ====
5-MeO-DALT is not a controlled substance in Canada as of 2025.

==== China ====
As of October 2015 5-MeO-DALT is a controlled substance in China.

==== Japan ====
5-MeO-DALT became a controlled substance in Japan from April 2007, by amendment to the Pharmaceutical Affairs Law.

==== Singapore ====
5-MeO-DALT is listed in the Fifth Schedule of the Misuse of Drugs Act (MDA) and therefore illegal in Singapore as of May 2015.

==== Sweden ====
Sveriges riksdag added 5-MeO-DALT to schedule I ("substances, plant materials and fungi which normally do not have medical use") as narcotics in Sweden as of May 1, 2012, published by Medical Products Agency in their regulation LVFS 2012:6 listed as 5-MeO-DALT N-allyl-N-[2-(5-metoxi-1H-indol-3-yl)etyl]-prop-2-en-1-amin.

==== United Kingdom ====
5-MeO-DALT became a Class A drug in the UK on January 7, 2015 after an update to the tryptamine blanket ban.

==== United States ====
5-MeO-DALT is not scheduled at the federal level in the United States, but it is likely that it could be considered an analog of 5-Meo-DiPT, which is a controlled substance in USA, or an analog of another tryptamine, in which case purchase, sale, or possession could be prosecuted under the Federal Analog Act.

===== Florida =====
5-MeO-DALT is a Schedule I controlled substance in the state of Florida making it illegal to buy, sell, or possess in Florida.

===== Louisiana =====
5-MeO-DALT is a Schedule I controlled substance in the state of Louisiana making it illegal to buy, sell, or possess in Louisiana.

== Research ==
=== Cluster headaches ===
Anecdotal reports and a small-scale trial indicate the potential of 5-MeO-DALT for the treatment of cluster headache, one of the most excruciating conditions known to medicine. These observations are consistent with evidence of efficacy of other chemically-related indoleamines in the treatment of cluster headache. One notable individual who obtained relief from cluster headaches with 5-MeO-DALT is Giancarlo DiTrapano.

== See also ==
- Substituted tryptamine
