= 5-HO-DiPT =

Chemical compound

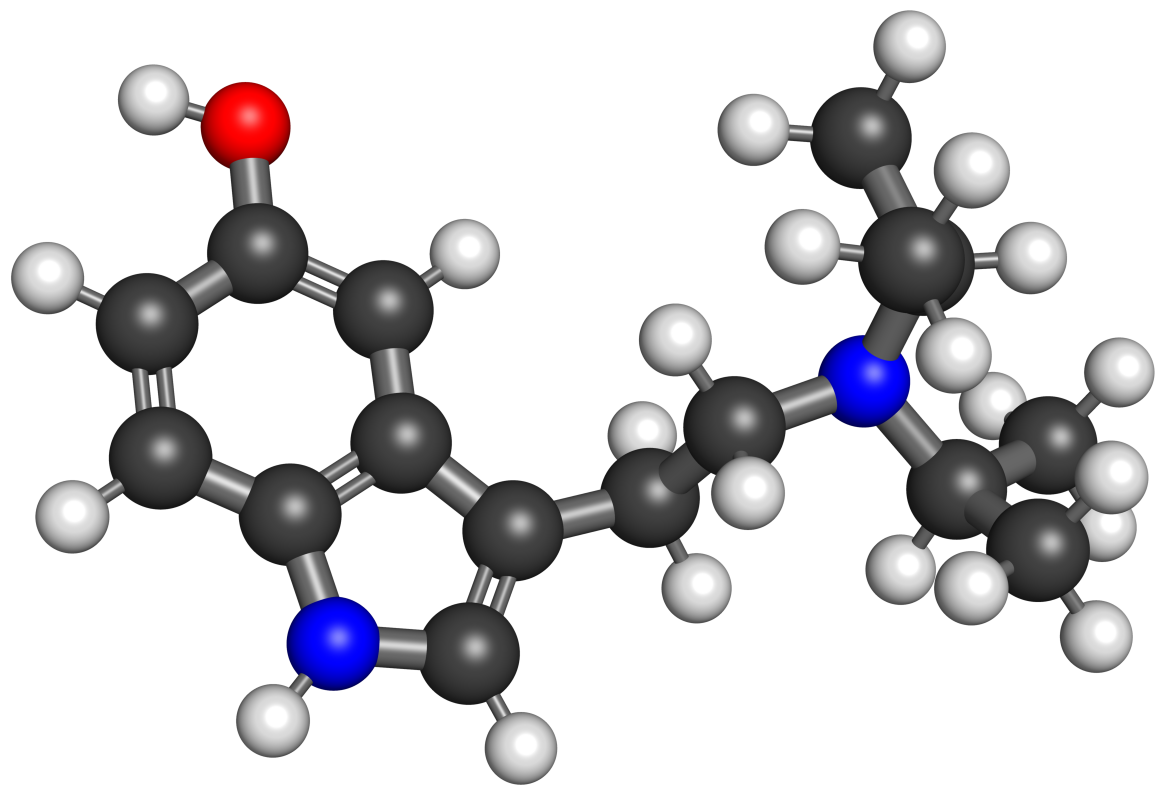

Clinical data
- Other names: 5-OH-DiPT; 5-Hydroxy-N,N-diisopropyltryptamine

Identifiers
- IUPAC name: 3-(2-(diisopropylamino)ethyl)-1H-indol-5-ol
- CAS Number: 36288-76-3
- PubChem CID: 71360804
- ChemSpider: 29358411
- UNII: G7I3OBF3XM
- CompTox Dashboard (EPA): DTXSID80784573

Chemical and physical data
- Formula: C_{16}H_{24}N_{2}O
- Molar mass: 260.381 g·mol^{−1}
- 3D model (JSmol): Interactive image
- SMILES: CC(C)N(CCC1=CNC2=C1C=C(C=C2)O)C(C)C
- InChI: InChI=1S/C16H24N2O/c1-11(2)18(12(3)4)8-7-13-10-17-16-6-5-14(19)9-15(13)16/h5-6,9-12,17,19H,7-8H2,1-4H3; Key:HWOLNTJLIUHEOG-UHFFFAOYSA-N

5-HO-DiPT, also known as 5-hydroxy-N,N-di-iso-propyltryptamine, is a tryptamine derivative which acts as a serotonin receptor agonist. It is primarily known as a metabolite of the better known psychoactive drug 5-MeO-DiPT, but 5-HO-DiPT has also rarely been encountered as a designer drug in its own right. Tests in vitro show 5-HO-DiPT to have high serotonin 5-HT_{2A} receptor affinity and good selectivity over the serotonin 5-HT_{1A} receptor, while being more lipophilic than the related drug bufotenine (5-HO-DMT), which produces primarily peripheral effects.

== Chemistry ==
=== Analogues ===
Analogues of 5-HO-DiPT include diisopropyltryptamine (DiPT), 4-HO-DiPT (iprocin), 4-AcO-DiPT (ipracetin), 5-MeO-DiPT, bufotenin (5-HO-DMT), 5-AcO-DMT, 5-HO-MET, 5-HO-DET, 5-HO-DPT, and α-methylserotonin (5-HO-AMT), among others.

== See also ==
- Substituted tryptamine
