= 4-AcO-DPT =

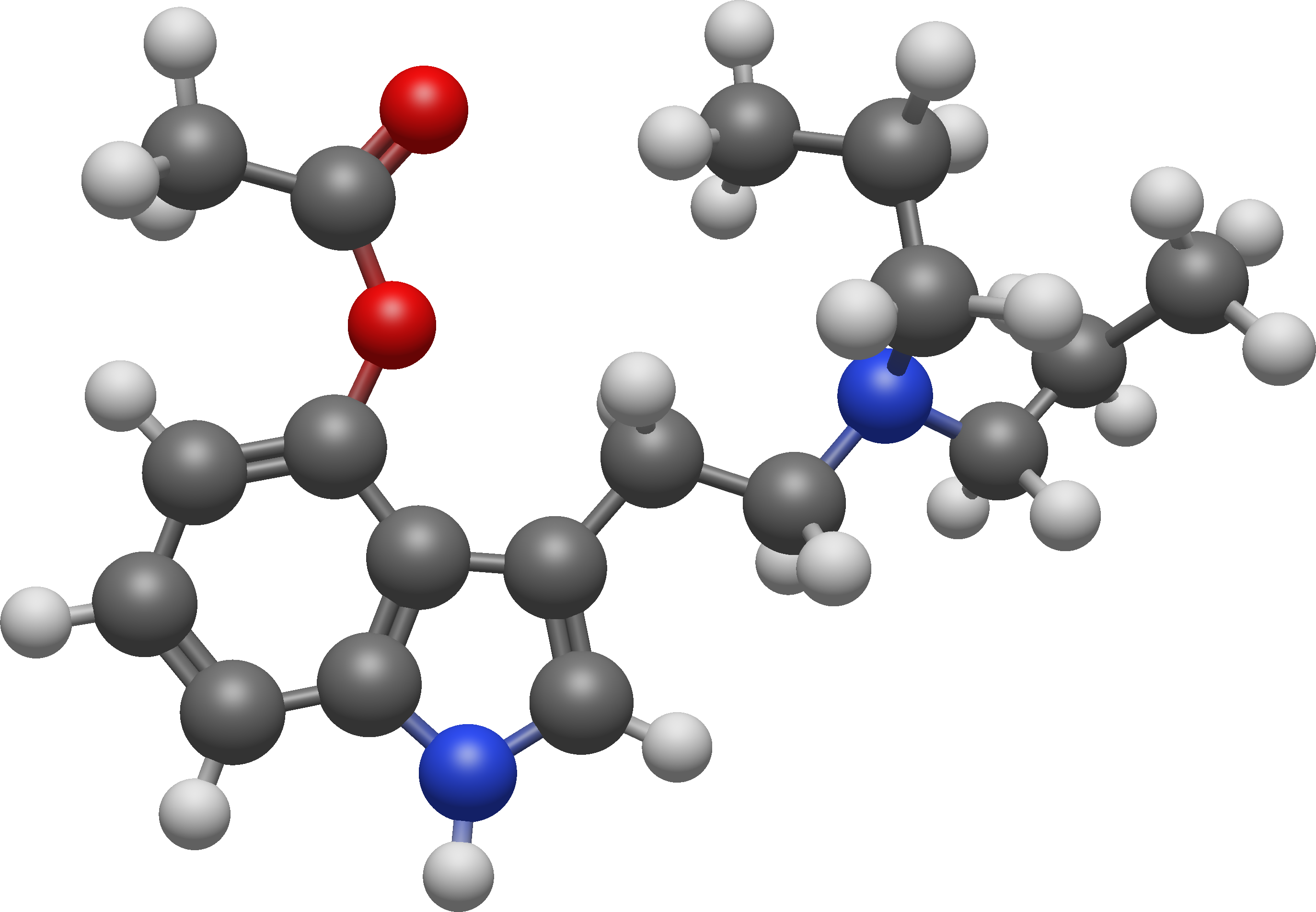

Clinical data
- Other names: Depracetin
- Routes of administration: Oral
- Drug class: Serotonergic psychedelic; Hallucinogen
- ATC code: None

Identifiers
- IUPAC name: 3-[2-(diethylamino)ethyl]-1H-indol-4-yl acetate
- CAS Number: 1445751-75-6
- PubChem CID: 73553809
- ChemSpider: 30647009
- UNII: 1L0R752595
- CompTox Dashboard (EPA): DTXSID501336712

Chemical and physical data
- Formula: C_{18}H_{26}N_{2}O_{2}
- Molar mass: 302.418 g·mol^{−1}
- 3D model (JSmol): Interactive image
- SMILES: CCCN(CCC)CCC1=CNC2=C1C(=CC=C2)OC(=O)C
- InChI: InChI=1S/C18H26N2O2/c1-4-10-20(11-5-2)12-9-15-13-19-16-7-6-8-17(18(15)16)22-14(3)21/h6-8,13,19H,4-5,9-12H2,1-3H3; Key:KRUGABVNKKKCJN-UHFFFAOYSA-N

4-AcO-DPT, also known as 4-acetoxy-N,N-dipropyltryptamine or as depracetin, is a psychedelic drug of the tryptamine family related to 4-AcO-DMT. It has been sold as a designer drug. It is an ester of 4-HO-DPT, a psychedelic tryptamine that was first synthesized by Alexander Shulgin. Anecdotal reports indicate that 4-AcO-DPT exerts psychoactive effects in humans, however the pharmacology of 4-AcO-DPT has not been examined. It has been identified in illicit products in Japan.

== Chemistry ==
=== Analogues ===
Analogues of 4-AcO-DPT include dipropyltryptamine (DPT), 4-HO-DPT (deprocin), 4-AcO-DMT (psilacetin), 4-AcO-DET (ethacetin), 4-AcO-DiPT (ipracetin), 4-AcO-MET (metacetin), 4-AcO-MPT, and 4-AcO-MiPT (mipracetin), among others.

== Society and culture ==
=== Legal status ===
==== Canada ====
4-AcO-DPT is not a controlled substance in Canada as of 2025.

== See also ==
- Substituted tryptamine
