= 4-HO-DPT =

Chemical compound

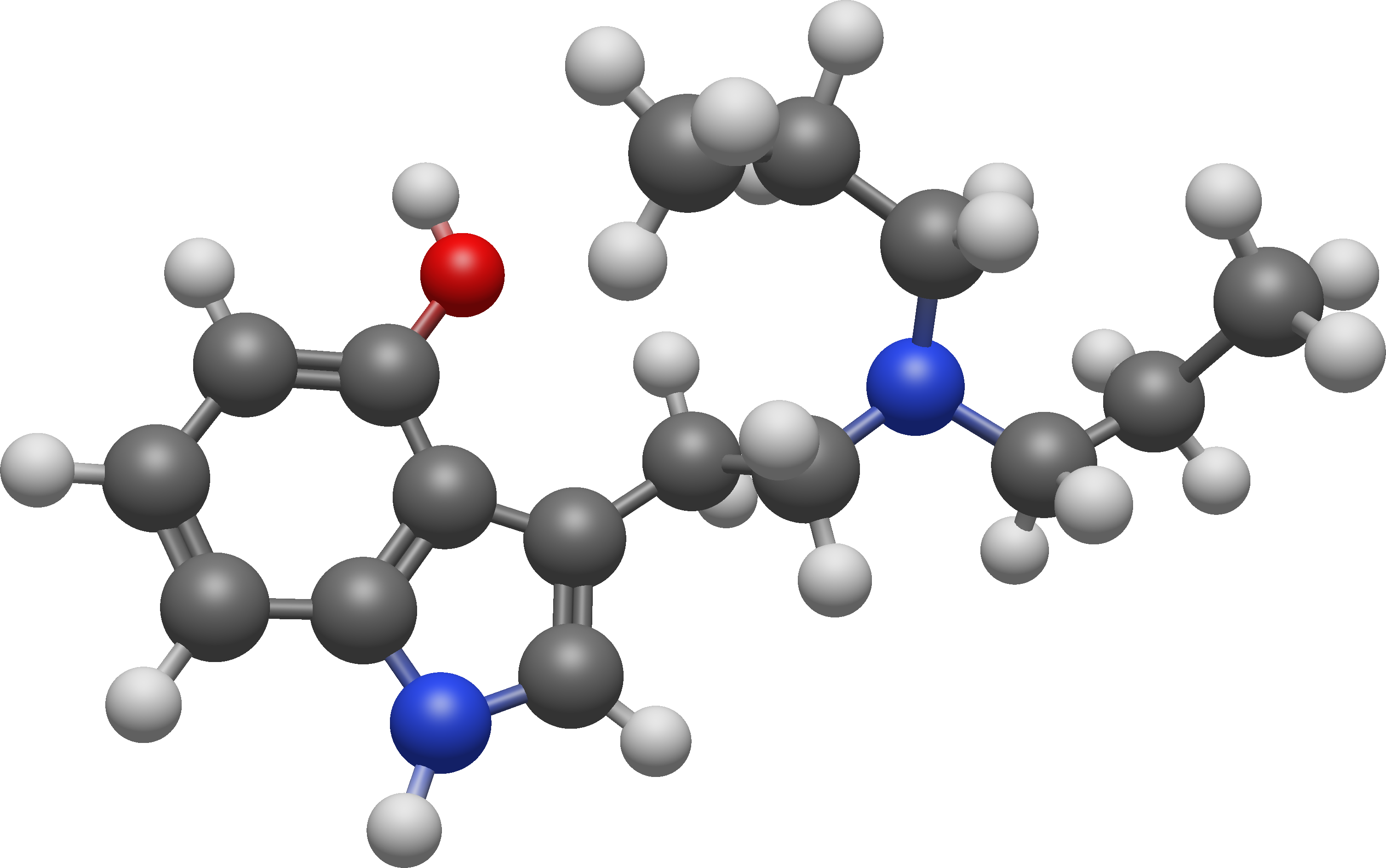

Clinical data
- Other names: 4-OH-DPT; 4-Hydroxy-N,N-dipropyltryptamine; Deprocin
- Routes of administration: Oral
- Drug class: Non-selective serotonin receptor agonist; Serotonin 5-HT_{2A} receptor agonist; Serotonergic psychedelic; Hallucinogen
- ATC code: None

Legal status
- Legal status: DE: NpSG (Industrial and scientific use only)

Pharmacokinetic data
- Onset of action: 15–45 minutes
- Duration of action: 5–8 hours

Identifiers
- IUPAC name: 3-[2-(dipropylamino)ethyl]-1H-indol-4-ol
- CAS Number: 63065-88-3
- PubChem CID: 21854223
- ChemSpider: 10579817
- UNII: KS597YAU98
- CompTox Dashboard (EPA): DTXSID90618835

Chemical and physical data
- Formula: C_{16}H_{24}N_{2}O
- Molar mass: 260.381 g·mol^{−1}
- 3D model (JSmol): Interactive image
- SMILES: CCCN(CCC)CCc2c[nH]c1cccc(O)c12
- InChI: InChI=1S/C16H24N2O/c1-3-9-18(10-4-2)11-8-13-12-17-14-6-5-7-15(19)16(13)14/h5-7,12,17,19H,3-4,8-11H2,1-2H3; Key:MZLRMPTVOVJXLW-UHFFFAOYSA-N

4-HO-DPT, also known as 4-hydroxy-N,N-dipropyltryptamine or as deprocin, is a psychedelic drug of the tryptamine and 4-hydroxytryptamine families related to psilocin (4-HO-DMT). It is taken orally.

The drug acts as a non-selective serotonin receptor agonist, including of the serotonin 5-HT_{2A} receptor. It produces psychedelic-like effects in animals. The drug is closely structurally related to other psychedelic tryptamines such as dipropyltryptamine (DPT), 5-MeO-DPT, and psilocin (4-HO-DMT), among others.

4-HO-DPT was first described in the scientific literature by David Repke and colleagues in 1977. It was encountered as a novel designer drug in 2012. A presumed prodrug, 4-AcO-DPT, is also known, and has likewise been encountered as a designer drug.

== Use and effects ==
According to Alexander Shulgin in his book TiHKAL (Tryptamines I Have Known and Loved) and other publications, the dose and duration of 4-HO-DPT are unknown. At a dose of 20 mg orally, there were possibly threshold effects and nothing more. Per Shulgin, there were not enough observations to know what dose would result in activity or what the effects would be. However, the occurrence of threshold effects at a dose of 20 mg was suggestive that "something is nearby".

Subsequently, 4-HO-DPT and its presumed prodrug 4-AcO-DPT have been encountered as novel designer drugs, substantiating the notion that more significant effects do indeed occur with 4-HO-DPT at sufficiently high doses. Based on user reports, 4-HO-DPT has an onset of 15 to 45 minutes, a duration of 5 to 8 hours, and produces hallucinogenic effects including psychedelic visuals among others.

== Pharmacology ==
=== Pharmacodynamics ===
4-HO-DPT activities
| Target | Affinity (K_{i}, nM) |
|---|---|
| 5-HT_{2A} | 1.6 (EC_{50}); 103% (E_{max}) |
| 5-HT_{2B} | 2.2 (EC_{50}); 94% (E_{max}) |
| 5-HT_{2C} | 212 (EC_{50}); 83% (E_{max}) |
Notes: The smaller the value, the more avidly the drug interacts with the site. Sources:

4-HO-DPT acts as a high-efficacy partial agonist to full agonist of the serotonin 5-HT_{2A}, 5-HT_{2B}, and 5-HT_{2C} receptors. It has more than two orders of magnitude greater potency as an agonist of the serotonin 5-HT_{2A} and 5-HT_{2B} receptors than as an agonist of the serotonin 5-HT_{2C} receptor. Hence, it shows considerable selectivity for the serotonin 5-HT_{2A} receptor over the serotonin 5-HT_{2C} receptor.

Compared to psilocin (4-HO-DMT), 4-HO-DPT has about the same potency and efficacy as a serotonin 5-HT_{2A} receptor agonist, has about the same potency but is much more efficacious as a serotonin 5-HT_{2B} receptor agonist (E_{max} = 39% vs. 94%, respectively), and has about the same efficacy but approximately 10-fold lower potency as a serotonin 5-HT_{2C} receptor agonist.

4-HO-DPT produces the head-twitch response, a behavioral proxy of psychedelic effects, in rodents. Its potency for inducing the head-twitch response in mice is about 4- or 5-fold lower than that of psilocin.

=== Pharmacokinetics ===
The metabolism of 4-HO-DPT has not been studied.

== Chemistry ==
4-HO-DPT, also known as 4-hydroxy-N,N-dipropyltryptamine, is a substituted tryptamine and 4-hydroxytryptamine derivative related to psilocin (4-HO-DMT).

=== Synthesis ===
The chemical synthesis of 4-HO-DPT has been described. It is said to be difficult to make.

=== Crystal structure ===
In 2019, Chadeayne and colleagues solved the crystal structure of the fumarate salt of 4-HO-DPT. The authors describe the structure as follows: "The asymmetric unit contains one 4-HO-DPT cation, protonated at the dipropylamine N atom. There are also two independent water molecules, and half of a fumarate ion present."

=== Analogues ===
Analogues of 4-HO-DPT include dipropyltryptamine (DPT), 5-MeO-DPT, psilocin (4-HO-DMT), 4-HO-DET, 4-HO-DiPT, 4-HO-MPT, 4-HO-EPT, 4-HO-PiPT, and 5-HO-DPT, among others. 4-AcO-DPT is a presumed prodrug of 4-HO-DPT.

== History ==
4-HO-DPT was first described in the scientific literature by David Repke and colleagues in 1977. Subsequently, it was described in further detail by Alexander Shulgin in his 1997 book TiHKAL (Tryptamines I Have Known and Loved). The drug was encountered as a novel designer drug in Europe in 2012.

== Society and culture ==
=== Legal status ===
==== Canada ====
4-HO-DPT is not a controlled substance in Canada as of 2025.

==== Germany ====
4-HO-DPT is controlled in Germany under the Neue-psychoaktive-Stoffe-Gesetz (NpSG; New Psychoactive Substances Act) as of July 2019.

==== Sweden ====
4-HO-DPT is classified as a "dangerous substance" Sweden, which means that it cannot be legally bought or sold without a special permit, though it is still not yet an illegal drug.

==== Switzerland ====
4-HO-DPT is a controlled substance in Switzerland as of 2020.

==== United Kingdom ====
4-HO-DPT is a Class A drug in the United Kingdom, as a result of the tryptamine catch-all clause.

==== United States ====
4-HO-DPT is not an explicitly controlled substance in the United States. However, the drug is a close analogue of psilocin (4-HO-DMT), which is a Schedule I controlled substance in this country, and hence sale for intended human consumption could be illegal under the Federal Analogue Act.

== See also ==
- Substituted tryptamine
