= Dipropyltryptamine =

Chemical compound

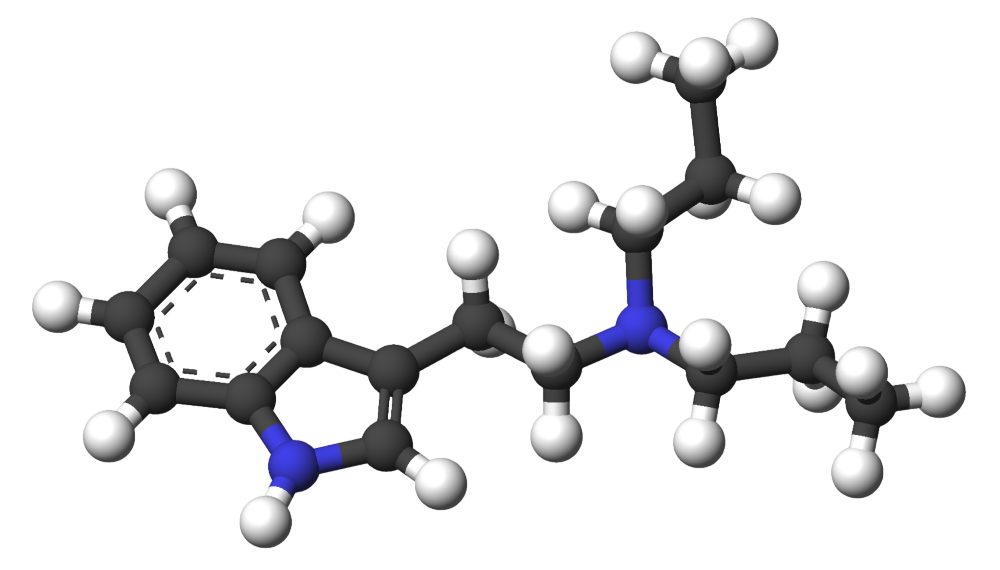

Clinical data
- Other names: DPT; Dipropyl-T; N,N-Dipropyltryptamine; 3-(2-(Dipropylamino)ethyl)indole; "The Light"
- Routes of administration: Oral, smoking, insufflation, rectal, intramuscular injection, intravenous injection
- Drug class: Serotonin receptor agonist; Serotonin 5-HT_{2A} receptor agonist; Serotonergic psychedelic; Hallucinogen
- ATC code: None

Legal status
- Legal status: DE: NpSG (Industrial and scientific use only); UK: Class A; US: Unscheduled

Pharmacokinetic data
- Onset of action: Oral: Fast; IN: 10–30 minutes Smoking: ≤2–5 min IM: 2–15 minutes
- Duration of action: Oral: 2–4 hours (but up to 12 hours at high doses); IN: 2–4 hours Smoking: 20 min–2 hours IM: ~3 hours

Identifiers
- IUPAC name: N-[2-(1H-indol-3-yl)]ethyl-N-propylpropan-1-amine
- CAS Number: 61-52-9
- PubChem CID: 6091
- ChemSpider: 5866
- UNII: S7272VWU50
- ChEMBL: ChEMBL1779153
- CompTox Dashboard (EPA): DTXSID30209847

Chemical and physical data
- Formula: C_{16}H_{24}N_{2}
- Molar mass: 244.382 g·mol^{−1}
- 3D model (JSmol): Interactive image
- Melting point: 174.5 to 178 °C (346.1 to 352.4 °F)
- SMILES: CCCN(CCC)CCC1=CNC2=C1C=CC=C2
- InChI: InChI=1S/C16H24N2/c1-3-10-18(11-4-2)12-9-14-13-17-16-8-6-5-7-15(14)16/h5-8,13,17H,3-4,9-12H2,1-2H3; Key:BOOQTIHIKDDPRW-UHFFFAOYSA-N

Dipropyltryptamine (DPT), also known as N,N-dipropyltryptamine or as "The Light", is a psychedelic drug of the tryptamine family related to dimethyltryptamine (DMT) and diethyltryptamine (DET). It is taken orally or by other routes such as smoking, insufflation, or injection. It has a relatively short duration of 2 to 4 hours orally or insufflated and 20 minutes to 2 hours smoked.

The drug acts as a serotonin receptor modulator, including as a serotonin 5-HT_{2A} receptor agonist. It is a close structural homologue of DMT and DET and is a skeletal isomer of diisopropyltryptamine (DiPT). Derivatives of DPT include 4-HO-DPT and 5-MeO-DPT, among others.

DPT was first described in the literature by 1954. Its hallucinogenic effects were first described by 1962. The drug was encountered as a novel designer drug by 1968 and was reported as a possible treatment for alcoholism in 1973. DPT has never been made an explicitly controlled substance in the United States. It is the sacrament of the Temple of the True Inner Light, a New York City-based psychedelic church, which considers DPT and other psychedelics to be God.

== Use and effects ==
In his book TiHKAL (Tryptamines I Have Known and Loved), Alexander Shulgin lists DPT's dose range as 100 to 250 mg orally and its duration as 2 to 4 hours. A 500 mg oral dose was also reported, which was described as "exhausting" and as lasting 12 hours. The onset and time to peak effects for oral administration were not given in TiHKAL, but it is said to have a fast onset. The drug was once thought to be orally inactive, necessitating non-oral administration, but this proved not to be the case. Some have suggested against use of DPT orally due to this route being unpredictable, less desirable in effect, and a waste of material. DPT in general is described as having a relatively abrupt cessation of effects, unlike the gradual termination of LSD.

In addition to oral administration, DPT has been assessed by smoking at a dose of 20 to 100 mg; by intramuscular injection at low doses of 15 to 30 mg, moderate doses of 30 to 70 mg, and "peak experience" doses of 75 to 125 mg; and by intravenous injection at 12 to 36 mg. Smoked DPT is said to have a near-immediate onset of within 2 to 5 minutes and a shorter duration ranging from 20 minutes to 2 hours. In contrast to dimethyltryptamine (DMT), it is possible to "build" on the effects of DPT with repeated spaced-out inhalations. The onset by intramuscular injection is 2 to 3 minutes, within 5 minutes, or 10 to 15 minutes per different sources and its duration is approximately 2 to 3 hours. However, it has been reported that the duration of DPT by this route ranges from 1.5 or 2 hours at smaller doses (15–30 mg) to 6 hours at higher doses (75–165 mg). Another route is insufflation, with a dose of 25 to 200 mg in different reports, which has an onset of 10 to 30 minutes, a time to peak of 1 hour, and a duration of 2 to 4 hours, but is said to be very painful and to have a strong chemical taste. There appears to be high variability in the effective dose between individuals with insufflation. DPT can also be used rectally, with a dose range of 50 to 75 mg.

The effects of DPT have been reported to include visuals, being intensely visual at high doses, changes in time perception, feeling like one is in a different place like on a mountain in clouds or in a big castle, enhanced recall of memories and experiences, enhanced emotional expressiveness and self-exploration, entity encounters, and religious feelings. Other effects included trouble talking, feeling uncomfortable, nervousness, feeling light, and body rush. Given at sufficient doses, it is described as every bit as powerful as a psychedelic as DMT or 5-MeO-DMT. According to one account however, DPT and DMT, despite their chemical similarity, "reveal completely different worlds".

Other reports have stated effects of DPT including visual and auditory hallucinations, increased color intensity, flashes of light and sparkles, apparitions of faces, increased music appreciation, ego dissolution, stimulation, euphoria, relaxation, paranoia, psychosis, anxiety, nausea, dizziness, muscle tremors, and increased heart rate, among others. Its duration is much shorter than those of certain other psychedelics like LSD, which can be advantageous in a clinical setting. However, it is also said to have a rapid onset that can be psychologically overwhelming. DPT has been found to readily produce "peak" or mystical experiences in clinical studies. The effects of DPT have been additionally described in The Entheogen Review, including in-depth or long-form experience reports.

== Side effects ==
Although tryptamines such as psilocybin and dimethyltryptamine (DMT) have relatively well‑characterized safety, synthetic analogues like DPT lack thorough toxicological evaluation and are mainly associated with anecdotal reports of intoxication and a few cases of fatal outcomes when used recreationally. The pharmacological similarity of DPT to DMT suggests a generally low intrinsic toxicity at controlled doses but a pronounced risk of acute adverse reactions, including agitation, tachycardia, hyperthermia, and serotonergic crisis, particularly in combination with monoamine oxidase inhibitors (MAOIs) or other serotonergic agents.

A meta-analysis of tryptamine psychedelics have further demonstrated cognitive effects through serotonin 5-HT_{2A} receptor modulation but have not identified persistent neurotoxicity. The main safety concerns are acute psychophysiological and behavioral disturbances rather than long‑term organ toxicity. Overall, DPT is a potent, short‑acting serotonergic hallucinogen with limited safety data and a toxicity profile comparable to related tryptamines such as DMT and 5-MeO-DMT.

=== Tolerance ===
DPT has been reported to produce rapid tolerance similarly to other psychedelic drugs. In one report, a second administration 2 hours after the first dose produced minimal effects.

== Overdose ==
A couple cases of death due to DPT have been reported. There is also a non-fatal case of head injury, seizures, and rhabdomyolysis due to DPT use. There is a case of tachycardia and rhabdomyolysis due to DPT as well.

== Interactions ==
DPT has been said to not be affected by monoamine oxidase inhibitors (MAOIs), in contrast to dimethyltryptamine (DMT).

== Pharmacology ==
=== Pharmacodynamics ===
DPT activities
Target	Affinity (K_{i}, nM)	Species
5-HT_{1A}	31.8–1,641 (K_{i}); 274–>10,000 (EC_{50}); 99% (E_{max})	Human; Human; Human
5-HT_{1B}	854–8,081 (K_{i}); 1,210 (EC_{50})	Human; Human
5-HT_{1D}	619	Human
5-HT_{1E}	2,338	Human
5-HT_{2A}	3.0–2,579 (K_{i}); 26.1–943^{a} (EC_{50}); 85^{a}–97% (E_{max})	Human; Human; Human
5-HT_{2B}	42	Human
5-HT_{2C}	281–3,500 (K_{i}); 444^{a} (EC_{50}); 93%^{a} (E_{max})	Human; Human; Human
5-HT_{3}	>10,000	Human
5-HT_{4}	ND	ND
5-HT_{5A}	4,373	Human
5-HT_{6}	4,543	Human
5-HT_{7}	284	Human
D_{1}	>10,000	Human
D_{2}	9,249	Human
D_{3}	1,361	Human
D_{4}	2,014	Human
D_{5}	>10,000	Human
α_{1A}	881	Human
α_{1B}	443	Human
α_{1D}	ND	ND
α_{2A}	458	Human
α_{2B}	339	Human
α_{2C}	514	Human
β_{1}–β_{2}	>10,000	Human
H_{1}	125	Human
H_{2}–H_{4}	>10,000	Human
M_{1}–M_{5}	>10,000	Human
I_{1}	340	Human
σ_{1}	397	Human
σ_{2}	2,917	Human
SERT	157–480 (K_{i}); 157–23,000 (IC_{50}); 100,000 (EC_{50})	Human; Human; Rat
NET	>10,000 (K_{i}); 2,900–3,202 (IC_{50}); 100,000 (EC_{50})	Human; Human; Rat
DAT	1,500 (K_{i}); 2,218–9,100 (IC_{50}); 100,000 (EC_{50})	Human; Human; Rat
Notes: The smaller the value, the more avidly the drug binds to the site. Footnotes: ^{a} = Stimulation of IP_{1} formation. Refs:

DPT is a serotonin receptor agonist in the rat uterus and stomach strip, with several-fold greater potency than dimethyltryptamine (DMT). It produces the head-twitch response, a behavioral proxy of psychedelic-like effects, in rodents. Studies on rodents have found that the effectiveness with which a selective 5-HT_{2A} receptor antagonist blocks the behavioral actions of DPT strongly suggests that the 5-HT_{2A} receptor is an important site of action for the drug, but the modulatory actions of a serotonin 5-HT_{1A} receptor antagonist also imply a serotonin 5-HT_{1A} receptor-mediated component to the actions of DPT. Unusually among most psychedelics, DPT did not show evidence of behavioral tolerance in rodents.

=== Pharmacokinetics ===
The metabolism of DPT has been described.

== Chemistry ==
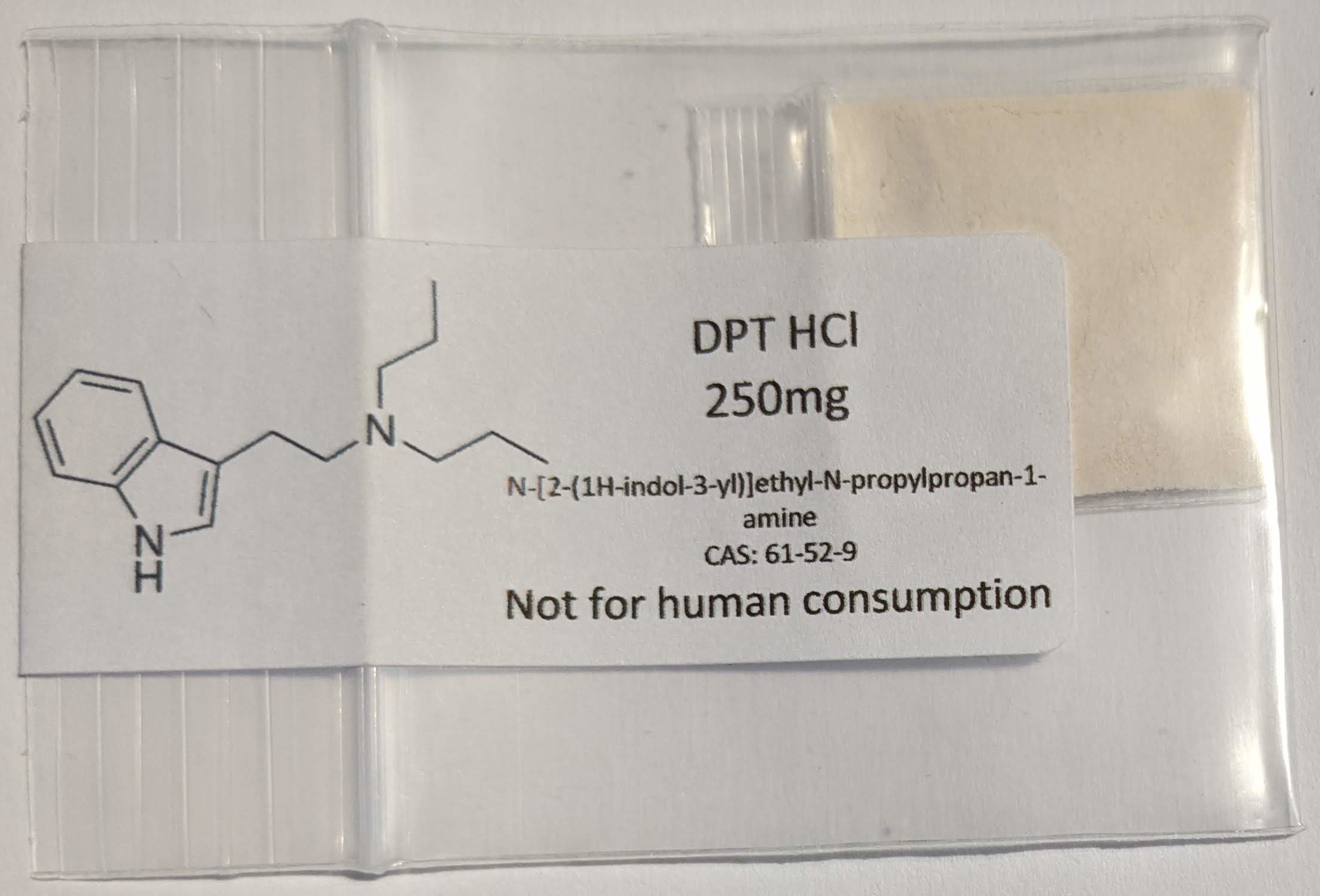
DPT hydrochloride powder.

DPT, also known as N,N-dipropyltryptamine, is a substituted tryptamine related to dimethyltryptamine (DMT). It is found either as a crystalline hydrochloride salt or as an oily or crystalline base. The drug is synthetic and has not been found to occur endogenously.

=== Synthesis ===
The chemical synthesis of DPT has been described. It can be synthesized from tryptamine or from indole. The drug's synthesis is described as being fairly simple.

=== Detection ===
DPT changes Ehrlich's reagent violet and causes the marquis reagent to turn yellow.

=== Analogues ===
Analogues of DPT include dimethyltryptamine (DMT), diethyltryptamine (DET), diisopropyltryptamine (DiPT), diallyltryptamine (DALT), methylethyltryptamine (MET), methylpropyltryptamine (MPT), ethylpropyltryptamine (EPT), propylisopropyltryptamine (PiPT), propylallyltryptamine (PALT), 4-HO-DPT, 5-HO-DPT, and 5-MeO-DPT, among others.

Cyclized tryptamine and partial ergoline derivatives of DPT include RU-28251 (4,α-methylene-DPT), Bay R 1531 (LY-197206; 4,α-methylene-5-MeO-DPT), LY-293284 (4,α-methylene-5-acetyl-DPT), LY-178210 (LY-228729; 4,α-methylene-5-carboxamido-DPT), and LY-301317 ((R)-4,α-methylene-5-(1,3-oxazol-5-yl)-DPT).

A positional isomer of DPT with the side chain instead located at the 4 position is DPAI (2-desoxo-2-ene-ropinirole).

== History ==
DPT was first described in the scientific literature by Speeter and Anthony in 1954. Its hallucinogenic effects were first discovered and described by Stephen Szára and colleagues by 1962 and preliminary findings for treatment of alcoholism were described in 1966. Use of DPT as a designer drug has been documented by law enforcement officials since as early as 1968. It was further described as a treatment for alcoholism by Stanislav Grof and William A. Richards and colleagues at the Spring Grove State Hospital in 1973. The drug was also studied for treatment of anxiety associated with terminal cancer in the late 1970s. However, it was not further studied for such purposes after 1980.

== Society and culture ==
=== Recreational use ===
DPT has been used recreationally, but has remained relatively obscure.

=== Religious use ===
DPT is used as a religious sacrament by the Temple of the True Inner Light, a psychedelic church based in New York City that was founded in 1980 and has operated for decades. The temple believes that DPT and other psychedelic drugs are the physical form of God.

=== Notable individuals ===
- Stephen Szára and colleagues discovered the hallucinogenic effects of DPT and first described them by 1962.
- Alan Birnbaum and the other members of the Temple of the True Inner Light have used DPT as their sacrament since 1980.
- Daniel Rakowitz smoked DPT at the Temple of the True Inner Light a few times in 1989 before being told to stay away.
- Peter Gorman tried DPT at the Temple of the True Inner Light and described his experience in High Times in 1990.
- Alexander Shulgin reviewed DPT and published experiences with the drug in his 1997 book TiHKAL (Tryptamines I Have Known and Loved).
- Daniel Pinchbeck wrote about his experiences with DPT in his 2003 book Breaking Open the Head.
- Hamilton Morris described his experiences with DPT in 2008.

=== Legal status ===
==== Canada ====
DPT is not a controlled substance in Canada as of 2025.

==== Sweden ====
DPT is illegal in Sweden as of 26 January 2016.

==== United Kingdom ====
DPT is a Class A drug in the United Kingdom, making it illegal to possess or distribute.

==== United States ====
DPT is not scheduled at the federal level in the United States. However, it could be considered an analogue of Schedule I psychedelic tryptamines like DMT and DET, in which case purchase, sale, or possession could be prosecuted under the Federal Analogue Act.

===== Florida =====
"DPT (N,N-Dipropyltryptamine)" is a Schedule I controlled substance in the state of Florida making it illegal to buy, sell, or possess in Florida.

===== Maine =====
DPT is a Schedule I controlled substance in the state of Maine making it illegal to buy, sell, or possess in Maine.

== Research ==
=== Psychiatric disorders ===
DPT has been studied in psychedelic therapy for treatment of psychiatric disorders such as alcoholism and end-of-life distress.

=== Fragile X syndrome ===
DPT has been found to completely prevent audiogenic seizures in mouse models of fragile X syndrome (FXS) at a 10 mg/kg dose, with its mechanism of action appearing to be independent of serotonin and sigma σ_{1} receptor activation. While DPT is an agonist at several serotonin receptors in vitro, its anticonvulsant effects were not blocked by selective serotonin 5-HT_{2A}, 5-HT_{1A}, or 5-HT_{1B} receptor antagonists nor by a selective sigma σ_{1} receptor antagonist in vivo. The drug's beneficial effects may be mediated by non-serotonergic pathways, possibly involving direct auditory processing modulation. At higher doses, DPT switched from anticonvulsant to proconvulsant action, indicating complex interactions.

== See also ==
- Substituted tryptamine
