= 4-Hydroxytryptamine =

Serotonin receptor agonist

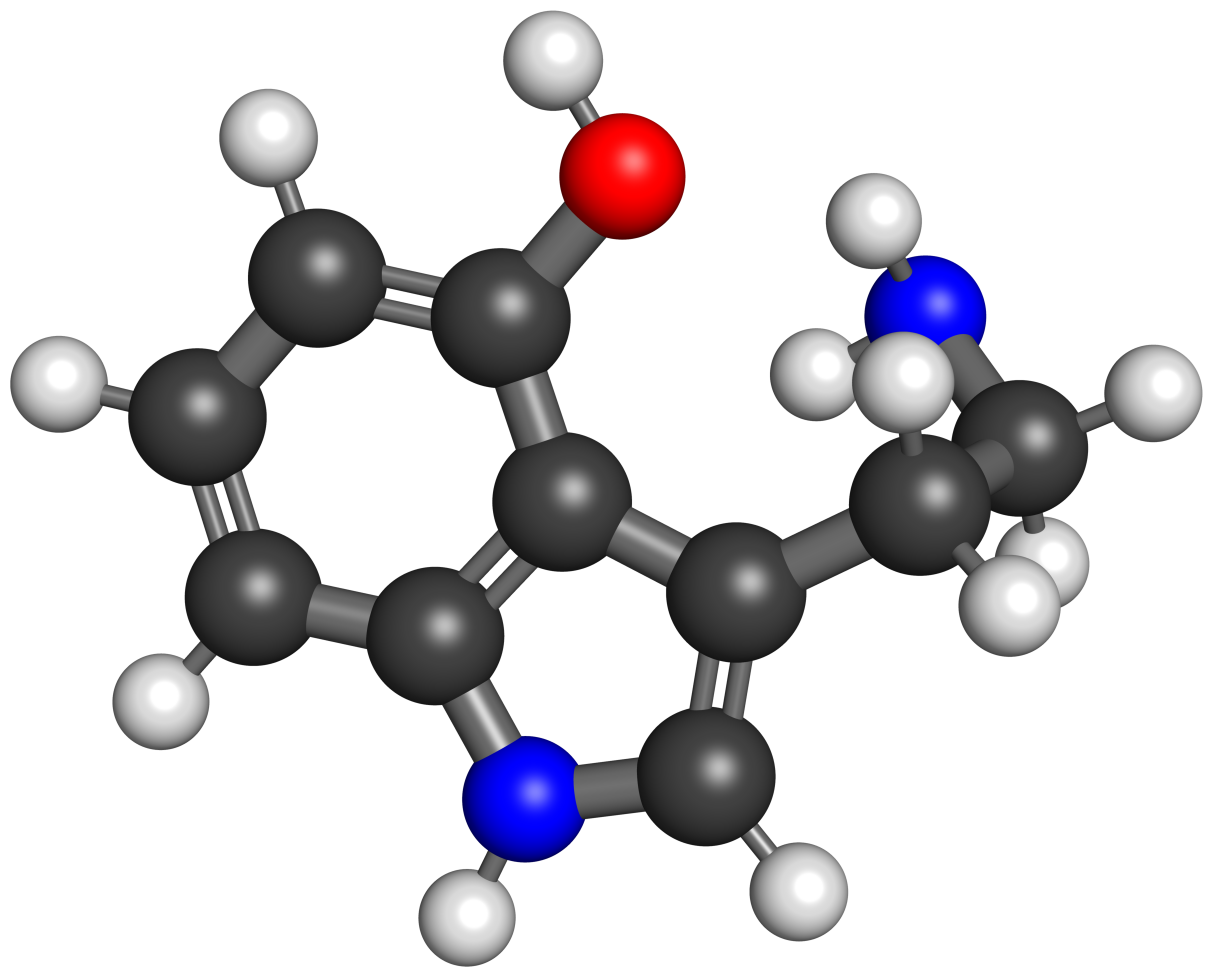

Clinical data
- Other names: 4-HT; 4-HTA; N,N-Didesmethylpsilocin; Dinorpsilocin
- Drug class: Serotonin receptor agonist; Non-hallucinogenic serotonin 5-HT_{2A} receptor agonist

Identifiers
- IUPAC name: 3-(2-aminoethyl)-1H-indol-4-ol
- CAS Number: 570-14-9
- PubChem CID: 11297
- ChemSpider: 10823
- UNII: DP0D1701D1
- KEGG: C21762
- ChEBI: CHEBI:139217
- ChEMBL: ChEMBL18855
- CompTox Dashboard (EPA): DTXSID30205607

Chemical and physical data
- Formula: C_{10}H_{12}N_{2}O
- Molar mass: 176.219 g·mol^{−1}
- 3D model (JSmol): Interactive image
- SMILES: C1=CC2=C(C(=C1)O)C(=CN2)CCN
- InChI: InChI=1S/C10H12N2O/c11-5-4-7-6-12-8-2-1-3-9(13)10(7)8/h1-3,6,12-13H,4-5,11H2; Key:FKIRTWDHOWAQGX-UHFFFAOYSA-N

4-Hydroxytryptamine (4-HT, 4-HTA), also known as N,N-didesmethylpsilocin, is a naturally occurring tryptamine alkaloid. It is closely related chemically to the neurotransmitter serotonin, the psychedelic psilocin, and is the active form of the tryptamine alkaloid norbaeocystin.

The compound is a serotonin receptor agonist, including of the serotonin 5-HT_{2A} receptor, but in contrast to certain closely related compounds like psilocin, appears to be non-hallucinogenic.

4-HT may occur naturally in Psilocybe baeocystis and Psilocybe cyanescens. It may serve as an alternative precursor in the biosynthesis of psilocybin (4-PO-DMT) in psilocybin mushrooms.

== Pharmacology ==
4-HT is a potent agonist of the serotonin 5-HT_{2A} receptor similarly to psilocin (EC_{50} = 38 nM and 21 nM, respectively). It also shows affinity for the serotonin 5-HT_{2C} receptor (K_{i} = 40 nM), the serotonin 5-HT_{1A} receptor (K_{i} = 95 nM), and the serotonin 5-HT_{1B} receptor (K_{i} = 1,050 nM). The drug produces serotonergic peripheral effects in animals, shows similar metabolism and metabolic stability to psilocin, and appears to cross the blood–brain barrier and hence is centrally penetrant.

Surprisingly however, the compound, similarly to baeocystin, norbaeocystin, and norpsilocin, does not produce the head-twitch response, a behavioral proxy of psychedelic effects, in animals, and hence is putatively non-hallucinogenic. In older literature, the psychoactive effects of 4-hydroxylated tryptamines have been said to increase in the series of 4-hydroxytryptamine, 4-hydroxy-N-methyltryptamine (norpsilocin], and 4-hydroxy-N,N-dimethyltryptamine (psilocin).

The reason for the lack of hallucinogenic effects with 4-HT and related compounds is unknown, but may be due to biased agonism of the serotonin 5-HT_{2A} receptor; or, more specifically, biased agonism for the β-arrestin2 signaling pathway.

Norbaeocystin is thought to be a prodrug of 4-HT, analogously to how psilocybin is a prodrug of psilocin and how baeocystin is thought to be a prodrug of norpsilocin.

== Chemistry ==
4-HT, also known as 4-hydroxytryptamine, is a substituted tryptamine derivative. It is a positional isomer of the neurotransmitter serotonin (5-hydroxytryptamine; 5-HT), an analogue of the serotonergic psychedelic psilocin (4-HO-DMT), and the dephosphorylated form of the tryptamine alkaloid norbaeocystin (4-phosphoryloxytryptamine; 4-PO-T).

=== Properties ===
The predicted log P of 4-HT is 0.65 to 1.1.

=== Derivatives ===
A large number of 4-hydroxytryptamine derivatives are known, including.

- 4-Hydroxytryptamines
  - 4-HO-AET
  - 4-HO-AMT
  - 4-HO-DALT (daltocin)
  - 4-HO-DBT
  - 4-HO-DiBT
  - 4-HO-DsBT
  - 4-HO-DtBT
  - 4-HO-DET (ethocin)
  - 4-HO-DiPT (iprocin)
  - 4-HO-DPT (deprocin)
  - 4-HO-EiBT (eibucin)
  - 4-HO-EiPT (eiprocin)
  - 4-HO-EPT (eprocin)
  - 4-HO-MALT (maltocin)
  - 4-HO-MBT
  - 4-HO-McPeT
  - 4-HO-McPT
  - 4-HO-MET (metocin)
  - 4-HO-MiBT
  - 4-HO-MiPT (miprocin)
  - 4-HO-MPMI (lucigenol)
  - 4-HO-MPT (meprocin)
  - 4-HO-MsBT
  - 4-HO-MtBT
  - 4-HO-NALT
  - 4-HO-NBnT
  - 4-HO-NET
  - 4-HO-NiPT
  - 4-HO-NMT
  - 4-HO-NPT
  - 4-HO-PiPT (piprocin)
  - 4-HO-pyr-T
  - 4-HO-TMT
  - Deupsilocin (HLP003; CYB003)
  - Norpsilocin (4-HO-NMT)
  - Psilocin (4-HO-DMT)
- 4-Methoxytryptamines
  - 4-Methoxytryptamine (4-MeO-T)
  - 4-MeO-DET
  - 4-MeO-DiPT
  - 4-MeO-DMT
  - 4-MeO-MiPT
- 4-Acetoxytryptamines
  - 4-AcO-DALT (dalcetin)
  - 4-AcO-DET (ethacetin)
  - 4-AcO-DiPT (ipracetin)
  - 4-AcO-DMT (psilacetin)
  - 4-AcO-DPT (depracetin)
  - 4-AcO-EiPT (ethipracetin)
  - 4-AcO-MALT
  - 4-AcO-McPT
  - 4-AcO-MET (metacetin)
  - 4-AcO-MiPT (mipracetin)
  - 4-AcO-MPT
  - 4-AcO-NMT
  - 4-AcO-TMT
- 4-Propionyloxytryptamines
  - 4-PrO-DiPT
  - 4-PrO-DMT
  - 4-PrO-MET
- 4-Glutaryloxytryptamines
  - 4-GO-DMT (RE109)
  - Luvesilocin (4-GO-DiPT; RE104)
- 4-Phosphoryloxytryptamines
  - Aeruginascin (4-PO-TMT)
  - Baeocystin (4-PO-NMT)
  - Ethocybin (4-PO-DET)
  - Norbaeocystin (4-PO-T)
  - Psilocybin (4-PO-DMT)
- Others
  - 1-Methylpsilocin (CMY-16)
  - 4-HO-5-MeO-T
  - 5-Methoxypsilocybin
  - CT-4201
  - EB-002 (EB-373)
  - MSP-1014
  - O-4310
  - Psilomethoxin

Many or all of these compounds are serotonin receptor agonists and/or serotonergic psychedelics.

== History ==
4-HT was first described in the scientific literature by 1959. Its pharmacology was first thoroughly characterized in 2024.

== See also ==
- Substituted tryptamine
- 6-Hydroxytryptamine
- 7-Hydroxytryptamine
