= Luvesilocin =

Chemical compound

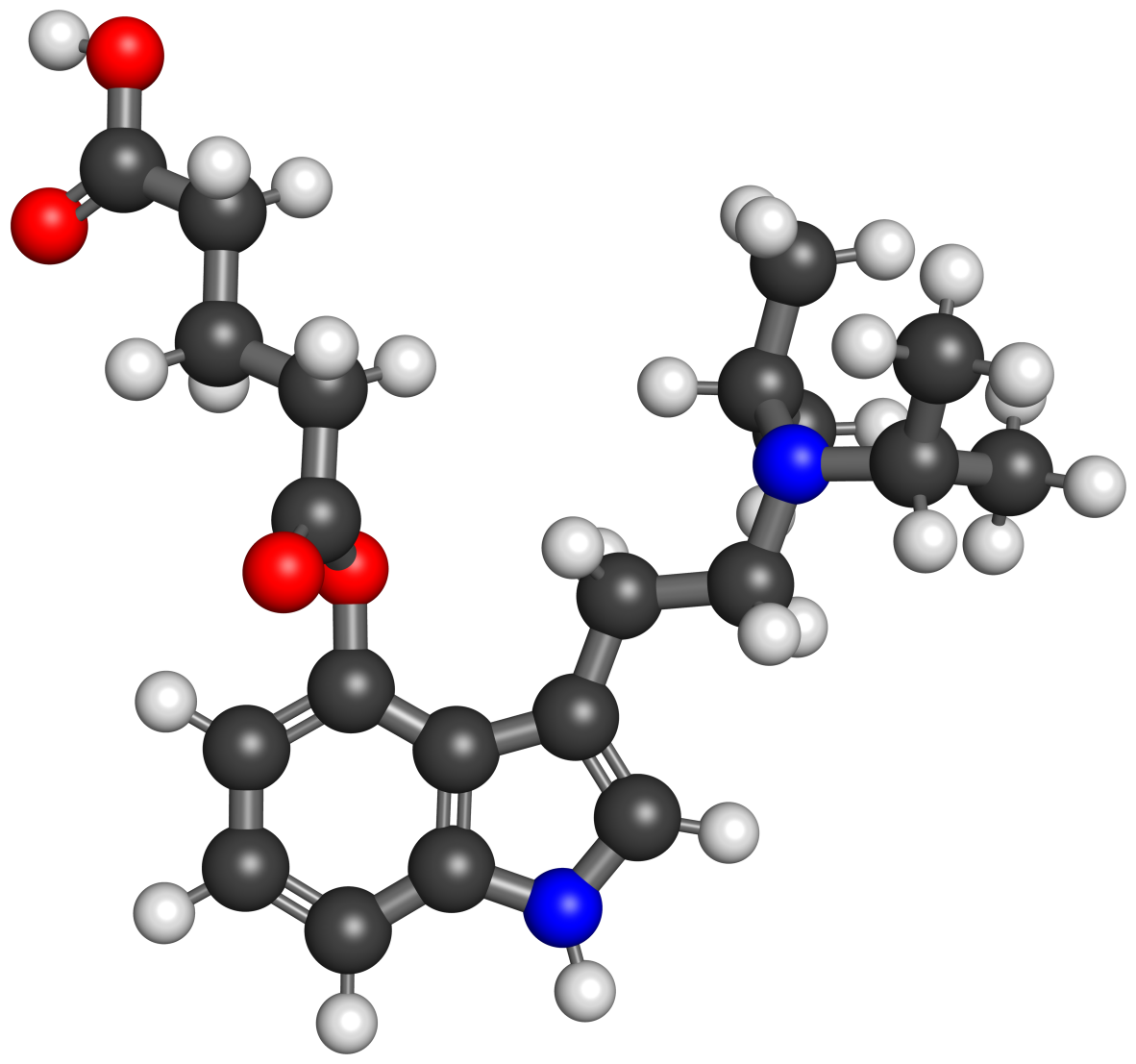

Clinical data
- Other names: RE-104; RE104; FT-104; FT104; 4-Glutaryloxy-N,N-diisopropyltryptamine; 4-Hydroxy-N,N-diisopropyltryptamine O-glutarate; O-Glutaryl-4-hydroxy-N,N-diisopropyltryptamine; 4-HO-DiPT glutarate; O-Glutaryl-4-HO-DiPT; 4-GO-DiPT
- Routes of administration: Oral, subcutaneous injection
- Drug class: Non-selective serotonin receptor agonist; Serotonin 5-HT_{2A} receptor agonist; Serotonergic psychedelic; Hallucinogen
- ATC code: None

Legal status
- Legal status: Investigational

Pharmacokinetic data
- Metabolites: • 4-HO-DiPT
- Onset of action: ≤1 hour (s.c.)
- Elimination half-life: • Luvesilocin: 0.43–0.64 hours (s.c.) • 4-HO-DiPT: 2.7–4.1 hours (s.c.)
- Duration of action: 3.6 hours (range ~3–4 hours) (s.c.)

Identifiers
- IUPAC name: 1-[3-[2-[Bis(1-methylethyl)amino]ethyl]-1H-indol-4-yl] pentanedioate
- CAS Number: 2756001-39-3
- PubChem CID: 162510634
- ChemSpider: 129909577
- UNII: 64JU3Z4Q2
- ChEMBL: ChEMBL5425653

Chemical and physical data
- Formula: C_{21}H_{30}N_{2}O_{4}
- Molar mass: 374.481 g·mol^{−1}
- 3D model (JSmol): Interactive image
- SMILES: CC(C)N(CCC1=CNC2=C1C(=CC=C2)OC(=O)CCCC(=O)O)C(C)C
- InChI: InChI=1S/C21H30N2O4/c1-14(2)23(15(3)4)12-11-16-13-22-17-7-5-8-18(21(16)17)27-20(26)10-6-9-19(24)25/h5,7-8,13-15,22H,6,9-12H2,1-4H3,(H,24,25); Key:LSDOIAGGRBGDJJ-UHFFFAOYSA-N

Luvesilocin, also known as RE104 and FT-104, as well as 4-glutaryloxy-N,N-diisopropyltryptamine (4-HO-DiPT O-glutarate or 4-GO-DiPT), is a psychedelic drug of the tryptamine and 4-hydroxytryptamine families which is under development for the treatment of psychiatric disorders. It is taken orally or by subcutaneous injection.

The drug is a prodrug ester of 4-HO-DiPT, which acts as a non-selective serotonin receptor agonist including of the serotonin 5-HT_{2A} receptor.

Luvesilocin was first described in the literature in 2021. It is under development for the treatment of postpartum depression and treatment-resistant depression. As of September 2025, the drug has reached phase 2 clinical trials. A phase 3 trial is planned for 2026.

== Use and effects ==
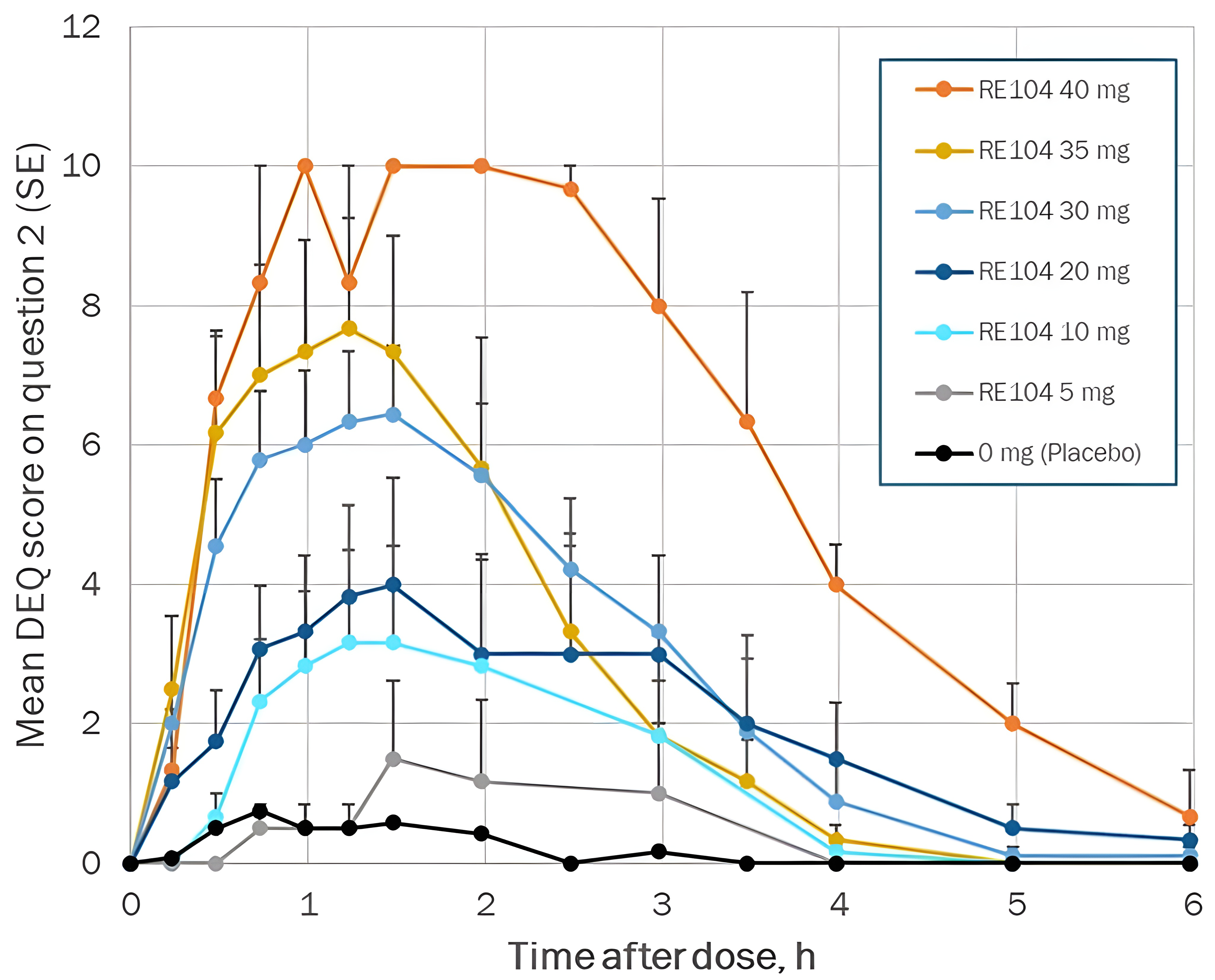
Luvesilocin (RE104; 4-GO-DiPT) Drug Effects Questionnaire (DEQ) "feel high" ratings at doses of 5 to 40 mg via subcutaneous injection over 6 hours.

The effects of luvesilocin have been clinically studied. It was evaluated at doses of 5 to 40 mg (equivalent to ~4–32 mg 4-HO-DiPT) by subcutaneous injection in this study. The drug was specifically assessed in terms of modified Drug Effects Questionnaire (DEQ) ratings, Mystical Experience Questionnaire (MEQ) ratings, and adverse effects. The mean duration of the psychedelic experience after administration of luvesilocin at a dose of 30 mg was found to be 3.6 hours.

== Pharmacology ==
=== Pharmacodynamics ===
Luvesilocin is a prodrug that is metabolized into 4-HO-DiPT. This metabolite is an analogue of the neurotransmitter serotonin and acts as a non-selective serotonin receptor agonist, including of the serotonin 5-HT_{2A} receptor. Activation of the serotonin 5-HT_{2A} receptor is thought to be specifically responsible for the hallucinogenic effects of serotonergic psychedelics.

4-HO-DiPT produces the head-twitch response, a behavioral proxy of psychedelic effects, in rodents. In drug discrimination tests, 4-HO-DiPT fully substituted for the psychedelic drug DOM, with 5-fold lower potency than DOM and 2-fold lower potency than psilocin (4-HO-DMT).

The drug activates basolateral amygdala (BLA) interneurons via the serotonin 5-HT_{2A} receptor to enhance GABAergic inhibition of principal neurons in the BLA, which may mediate an anxiolytic effect of suppression of learned fear (fear extinction) in rodents.

=== Pharmacokinetics ===
Given by subcutaneous injection, the elimination half-life of luvesilocin is 0.43 to 0.64 hours and of 4-HO-DiPT is 2.7 to 4.1 hours. The mean duration with this route at the employed dose was 3.6 hours.

== Chemistry ==
=== Properties ===
The predicted log P of luvesilocin is 1.2 and of 4-HO-DiPT is 3.6.

=== Synthesis ===
The chemical synthesis of luvesilocin has been described.

=== Analogues ===
Analogues of luvesilocin include 4-HO-DiPT (iprocin), 4-AcO-DiPT (ipracetin), 4-PrO-DiPT, 4-AcO-DMT (psilacetin), 4-PrO-DMT, and 4-GO-DMT (RE-109), among others.

== History ==
Luvesilocin was first described in the literature in 2021.

== Society and culture ==
=== Names ===
Luvesilocin is the generic name of the drug and its INN. It is also known by its developmental code names RE104 or RE-104 and FT104 or FT-104.

=== Legal status ===
==== Canada ====
Luvesilocin is not a controlled substance in Canada as of 2025.

==== United States ====
Luvesilocin is not an explicitly controlled substance in the United States. However, it could be considered a controlled substance under the Federal Analogue Act if intended for human consumption.

== Research ==
Luvesilocin is under development for the treatment of postpartum depression (PPD), treatment-resistant depression, and other psychiatric disorders. As of September 2025, it has reached phase 2 clinical trials for these indications. A phase 3 trial is planned for 2026. The drug is being developed by Reunion Neuroscience (formerly known as Field Trip Health).

== See also ==
- Substituted tryptamine
- List of investigational hallucinogens and entactogens
- Bretisilocin (5-fluoro-MET; GM-2505)
- CT-4201, EB-002, and MSP-1014
