= 4-AcO-DMT =

Psychedelic drug

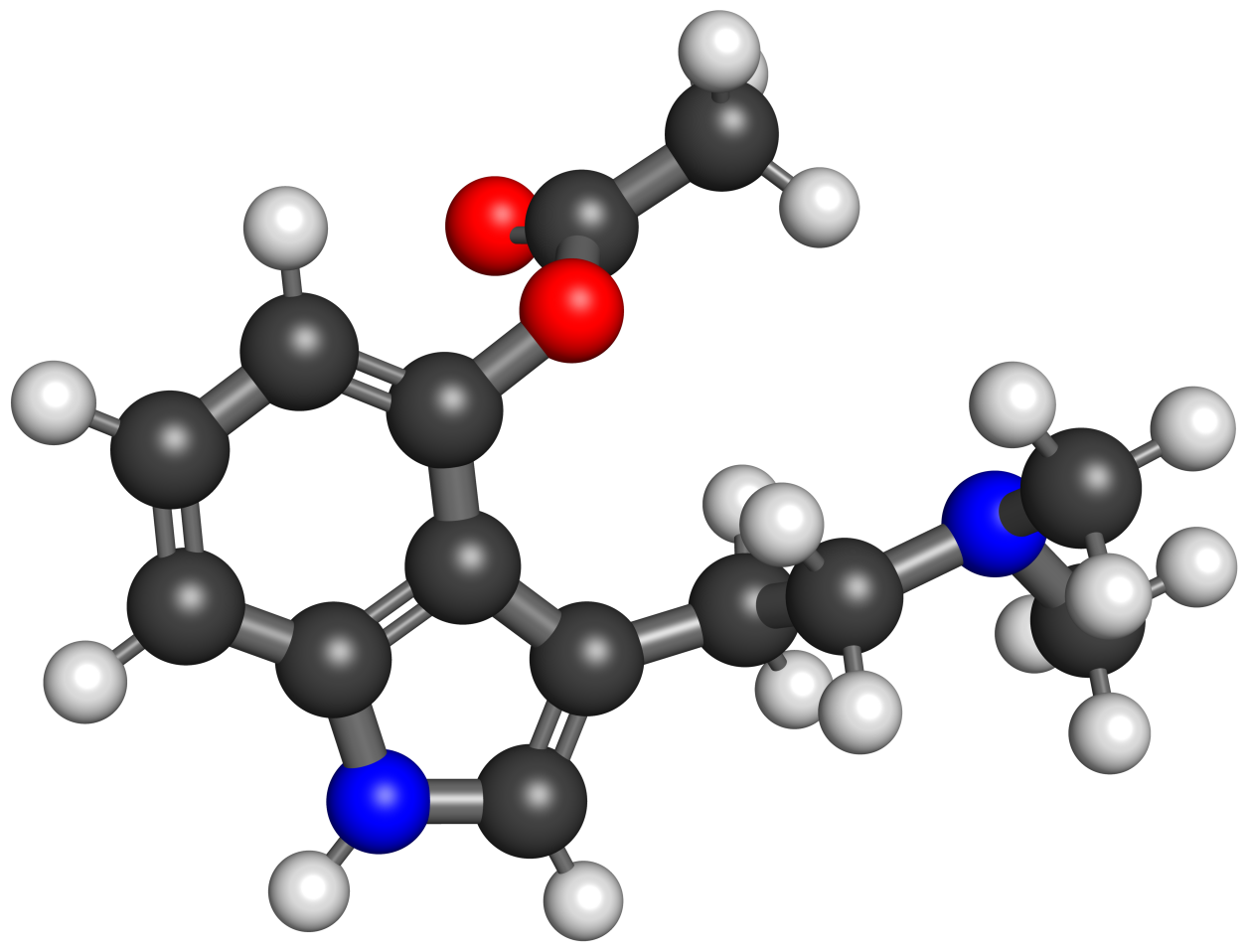

Clinical data
- Other names: 4-Acetoxy-N,N-dimethyltryptamine; 4-Acetoxy-DMT; 4-AcO-DMT; O-Acetylpsilocin; Acetylpsilocin; Psilocin O-acetate; PSOA; Psilacetin; Psiloacetin; Synthetic shrooms
- Routes of administration: Oral
- Drug class: Non-selective serotonin receptor agonist; Serotonin 5-HT_{2A} receptor agonist; Serotonergic psychedelic; Hallucinogen
- ATC code: None

Legal status
- Legal status: AU: S9 (Prohibited substance); BR: Class F2 (Prohibited psychotropics); CA: Unscheduled; DE: NpSG (Industrial and scientific use only); UK: Class A; US: Federally unscheduled; illegal under the Federal Analogue Act

Pharmacokinetic data
- Metabolism: Deacetylation, others
- Metabolites: • Psilocin • Psilocin metabolites
- Onset of action: 15–40 minutes
- Duration of action: 3–8 hours

Identifiers
- IUPAC name: 3-[2-(dimethylamino)ethyl]-1H-indol-4-yl acetate
- CAS Number: 92292-84-7
- PubChem CID: 15429212
- ChemSpider: 21106357
- UNII: 8BLF220HX1
- CompTox Dashboard (EPA): DTXSID30238955

Chemical and physical data
- Formula: C_{14}H_{18}N_{2}O_{2}
- Molar mass: 246.310 g·mol^{−1}
- 3D model (JSmol): Interactive image
- Melting point: 172 to 173 °C (342 to 343 °F)
- SMILES: CC(=O)Oc2cccc1[nH]cc(CCN(C)C)c12
- InChI: InChI=1S/C14H18N2O2/c1-10(17)18-13-6-4-5-12-14(13)11(9-15-12)7-8-16(2)3/h4-6,9,15H,7-8H2,1-3H3; Key:RTLRUOSYLFOFHV-UHFFFAOYSA-N

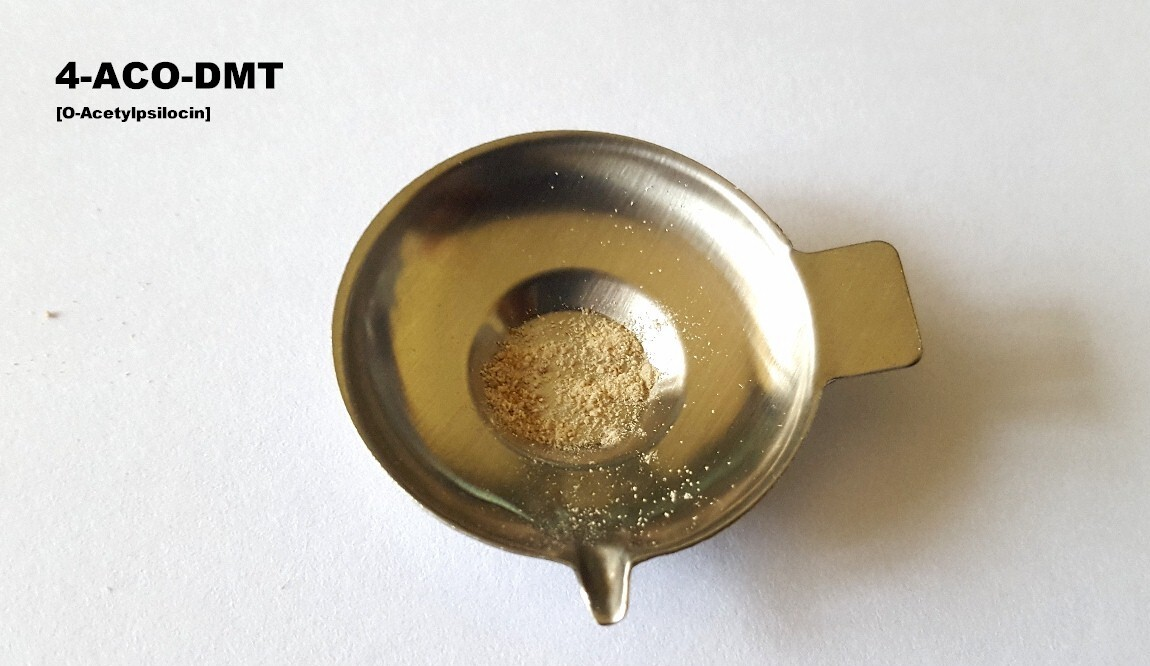
4-AcO-DMT

4-Acetoxy-N,N-dimethyltryptamine (4-AcO-DMT or 4-acetoxy-DMT), also known as O-acetylpsilocin or psilacetin, is a psychedelic drug of the tryptamine family related to psilocybin and psilocin. It is a synthetic derivative of psilocin (4-HO-DMT) in which the hydroxyl group has been acetylated, and is the analogue of psilocybin (4-PO-DMT) in which the phosphate ester has been replaced with an acetate ester. The drug is a prodrug of psilocin and is used orally similarly to psilocybin.

As a prodrug of psilocin, 4-AcO-DMT acts as a non-selective serotonin receptor agonist, including of the serotonin 5-HT_{2A} receptor. The hallucinogenic effects of psilocin are thought to be mediated by activation of this receptor, although other receptors also contribute to its effects. 4-AcO-DMT's effects are reported to be similar to those of psilocybin and psilocybin mushrooms. However, it has been said to have reduced side effects such as nausea and body load that can be caused by ingestion of whole psilocybin mushrooms. It is also said to have a faster onset and shorter duration than psilocybin. The drug is not expected to differ from psilocybin or psilocin in terms of safety. 4-AcO-DMT is modestly less potent by weight than psilocybin in animals when they are given at equimolar doses.

4-AcO-DMT was first described in a patent by Albert Hofmann in 1963 and its chemical synthesis was improved by David E. Nichols and colleagues in 1999. It was suggested by Nichols as a more economical and accessible alternative to psilocybin for use in scientific research, as the synthesis of psilocybin is more challenging and as psilocybin is a controlled substance. 4-AcO-DMT was first detected as a designer drug in Europe in 2009. It became increasingly prevalent as a recreational drug in the 2010s and has been the most commonly used novel tryptamine. In the 2020s, 4-AcO-DMT became widely encountered in the form of mushroom edibles in the United States as an alternative to psilocybin. Relatedly, it has sometimes been referred to as "synthetic shrooms".

So-called "mushroom edibles" sold at places such as gas stations and headshops may contain 4-AcO-DMT, Amanita muscaria mushroom extract, or unrelated drugs such as bath salts, and have been linked to severe and potentially deadly adverse effects.

4-AcO-DMT is not scheduled under United States law or any international drug schedules, including the United Nations 1971 Convention on Psychotropic Substances, making it a potentially more accessible alternative to psilocybin for research. It can be imported and possessed for research in the United States if labeled "for research purposes only not approved by the FDA for human consumption,", however marketing or distributing it to humans as psilocybin, a schedule 1 narcotic carries the same penalties of intent.

== Use and effects ==
In his book TiHKAL (Tryptamines I Have Known and Loved), Alexander Shulgin lists the same dose range of 10 to 20 mg orally and duration of 3 to 6 hours for psilocin, psilocybin, and 4-AcO-DMT. Another publication gave a 4-AcO-DMT dose range of 10 to 15 mg orally, with a typical dose of 12.5 mg orally, and a duration of about 5 to 8 hours. A further source gave a dose range for the drug of 5 to 30 mg orally, an onset of 15 to 40 minutes, and a duration of 4 to 7 hours. 4-AcO-DMT is a prodrug of psilocin similarly to psilocybin and its effects are reported to be similar or identical to those of psilocybin and psilocybin-containing mushrooms. However, it is said to produce less nausea and body load than psilocybin-containing mushrooms. The drug is also often described as having a faster onset and shorter duration than psilocybin. 4-AcO-DMT exposure results in modestly lower peripheral plasma concentrations of psilocin by weight than psilocybin in animals when they are given at equimolar doses.

Specific effects of 4-AcO-DMT have been reported to include psychedelic visuals, closed-eye imagery, synesthesia, insights, disembodiment, euphoria, feelings of bliss and unity, oceanic boundlessness, ego dissolution, sedation, cognitive impairment, and spiritual experiences, among others. Adverse effects have been reported to include psychological side effects such as anxiety, paranoia, and low mood as well as gastrointestinal side effects such as nausea and vomiting.

== Side effects ==
4-AcO-DMT, as a prodrug of psilocin, is not expected to differ from psilocybin or psilocin in terms of safety.

== Pharmacology ==
=== Pharmacodynamics ===
Psilocin at molecular targets
Target	Affinity (K_{i}, nM)
5-HT_{1A}	49–567 (K_{i}); 130–>3,160 (EC_{50}); 0.7%–96% (E_{max})
5-HT_{1B}	31–305
5-HT_{1D}	19–36
5-HT_{1E}	44–52
5-HT_{1F}	ND
5-HT_{2A}	6.0–340 (K_{i}); 2.4–3,836 (EC_{50}); 16–98% (E_{max})
5-HT_{2B}	4.6–410 (K_{i}); 2.4–>20,000 (EC_{50}); 1.4–84% (E_{max})
5-HT_{2C}	10–141 (K_{i}); 9.1–30 (EC_{50}); 86–95% (E_{max})
5-HT_{3}	>10,000
5-HT_{4}	ND
5-HT_{5A}	70–84
5-HT_{6}	57–72
5-HT_{7}	3.5–72
α_{1A}–α_{1B}	>10,000
α_{2A}	1,379–2,044
α_{2B}	1,271–1,894
α_{2C}	4,404
β_{1}–β_{2}	>10,000
D_{1}	20–>14,000
D_{2}	3,700–>10,000
D_{3}	101–8,900
D_{4}	>10,000
D_{5}	>10,000
H_{1}	1,600–>10,000
H_{2}–H_{4}	>10,000
M_{1}–M_{5}	>10,000
σ_{1}	>10,000
σ_{2}	>10,000
I_{2}	792
TAAR1	1,400 (K_{i}) (rat); 17,000 (K_{i}) (mouse); 920–2,700 (EC_{50}) (rodent) >30,000 (EC_{50}) (human)
SERT	3,650–>10,000 (K_{i}); 662–3,900 (IC_{50}); 561 (EC_{50}); 54% (E_{max})
NET	13,000 (K_{i}); 14,000 (IC_{50}) >10,000 (EC_{50})
DAT	6,000–>30,000 (K_{i}) >100,000 (IC_{50}) >10,000 (EC_{50})
Notes: The smaller the value, the more avidly psilocin interacts with the site. Sources:

4-AcO-DMT is a prodrug of psilocin (4-HO-DMT). As a prodrug of psilocin, 4-AcO-DMT acts as a non-selective agonist of serotonin receptors, including of the serotonin 5-HT_{2A} receptor. The psychedelic effects of 4-AcO-DMT are mediated specifically by activation of the serotonin 5-HT_{2A} receptor.

Similarly to psilocybin, psilocin, and other serotonergic psychedelics, 4-AcO-DMT produces the head-twitch response, a behavioral proxy of psychedelic effects, in rodents. In addition, like psilocybin and other psychedelics, 4-AcO-DMT fully substitutes for the psychedelic DOM in rodent drug discrimination tests. 4-AcO-DMT produces effects such as hypolocomotion and hypothermia in rodents as with psilocin as well.

=== Pharmacokinetics ===
There are no clinical studies of the pharmacokinetics of 4-AcO-DMT as of 2024. However, the pharmacokinetics of 4-AcO-DMT have been studied in rodents. The drug was confirmed to act as a prodrug of psilocin similarly to psilocybin (4-PO-DMT). However, given by intraperitoneal injection at equimolar doses, 4-AcO-DMT showed only 70% of the relative bioavailability or total exposure of psilocybin. Hence, 4-AcO-DMT results in modestly lower psilocin levels than psilocybin even when the drugs are given at equivalent doses with adjustment for differences in molecular weight. Along similar lines, the psilocin concentrations with 4-AcO-DMT 15 minutes after administration were 75 to 90% of those of an equimolar dose of psilocybin. The elimination half-life of psilocin was approximately 30 minutes and did not differ between 4-AcO-DMT and psilocybin. Psilocin ester prodrugs like 4-AcO-DMT are cleaved into psilocin by esterase enzymes.

A 2025 in-vitro study examined the stability and metabolism of several psilocin ester prodrugs, including 4-AcO-DMT. The results showed that 4-AcO-DMT was rapidly broken down into psilocin by esterase enzymes, with over 99.9% of the prodrug converted within 5 minutes under conditions mimicking the human body (i.e., in human plasma). These findings support the idea that 4-AcO-DMT is quickly and efficiently converted into psilocin before it enters the bloodstream, and that the prodrug itself likely contributes little to the overall pharmacological effect.

== Chemistry ==
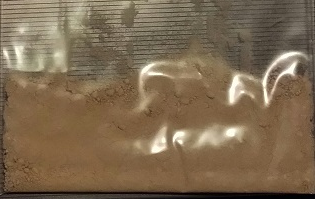
4-AcO-DMT shown in powder form.

=== Synthesis ===
4-AcO-DMT can be obtained by acetylation of psilocin under alkaline or strongly acidic conditions. It is, therefore, a synthetic compound. 4-AcO-DMT is more resistant than psilocin to oxidation under basic conditions due to its acetoxy group. It is not as difficult as psilocybin to synthesize.

=== Stability ===
Given enough time in unfavorable conditions, 4-AcO-DMT can sometimes turn into a degraded form which is brown in color and can even progress into a brown/black tar-like substance. Researchers hypothesize this is a polymerization reaction and is said to have no effect on the potency of the substance. Preliminary GCMS analysis of the closely related homologue 4-AcO-DET suggests that this degraded form of 4-AcO-DMT consists mainly of the hydroxy form of the parent molecule.

=== Analogues ===
4-AcO-DMT is closely related to psilocin (4-HO-DMT) and psilocybin (4-PO-DMT). It is a lower homologue of 4-AcO-MET, 4-AcO-DET, 4-AcO-MiPT, and 4-AcO-DiPT. Other analogues of 4-AcO-DMT include 4-AcO-DPT, 4-MeO-DMT, and 4-PrO-DMT (O-propionylpsilocin). Other related prodrugs of psilocin besides 4-AcO-DMT, 4-PrO-DMT, and psilocybin include CT-4201, EB-002, RE-109 (4-GO-DMT), and MSP-1014.

== History ==
4-AcO-DMT and several other esters of psilocin were patented on January 16, 1963, by Sandoz via Albert Hofmann and Franz Troxler. The drug's chemical synthesis was improved by David E. Nichols and colleagues in 1999 and it was suggested as a more economical and accessible alternative to psilocybin for use in scientific research. 4-AcO-DMT was first detected as a designer drug in Europe in 2009. It became increasingly prevalent as a recreational drug in the 2010s and has been the most commonly used novel tryptamine. In the 2020s, 4-AcO-DMT became widely encountered in the form of mushroom edibles in the United States as an alternative to psilocybin and psilocybin-containing mushrooms.

== Society and culture ==
=== Legal status ===
==== International ====
4-AcO-DMT is not scheduled under any international drug schedules, including the United Nations 1971 Convention on Psychotropic Substances, making it a potentially more accessible alternative to psilocybin for research.

==== Australia ====
4-AcO-DMT can be considered an analog of psilocin making it a Schedule 9 prohibited substance in Australia under the Poisons Standard (October 2015). A Schedule 9 substance is a substance which may be abused or misused, the manufacture, possession, sale or use of which should be prohibited by law except when required for medical or scientific research, or for analytical, teaching or training purposes with approval of Commonwealth and/or State or Territory Health Authorities.

==== Canada ====
4-AcO-DMT is not a controlled substance in Canada as of 2025.

==== Czech Republic ====
4-AcO-DMT is prohibited in Czech Republic except strictly limited research and therapeutical purposes.

==== Germany ====
4-AcO-DMT is banned in Germany.

==== Israel ====
4-AcO-DMT is illegal in Israel as it is an ester of a prohibited substance.

==== Italy ====
4-AcO-DMT is illegal in Italy as it is an ester of a prohibited substance.

==== Sweden ====
The Riksdag added 4-AcO-DMT to Narcotic Drugs Punishments Act under swedish schedule I ("substances, plant materials and fungi which normally do not have medical use" ) as of January 25, 2017, published by Medical Products Agency (MPA) in regulation HSLF-FS 2017:1 listed as "4-acetoxi-N,N-dimetyltryptamin".

==== United Kingdom ====
4-AcO-DMT, being an ester of psilocin, is a Class A drug in the United Kingdom under the Misuse of Drugs Act 1971.

==== United States ====
4-AcO-DMT is not an explicitly controlled substance in the United States. However, it may be considered an analogue of psilocin and psilocybin under the Federal Analogue Act, but only if intended or used for human consumption. Conversely, if not intended for human consumption, for instance if used only for research purposes, it may be considered legal.

While not controlled at the federal level, 4-AcO-DMT is listed as a controlled substance at the state level in multiple states in the United States, including in Alabama which has made it a schedule I at the state level on March 18, 2014, along with several other tryptamine analogues.

== See also ==
- Substituted tryptamine
- Psychedelic mushroom store
- List of investigational hallucinogens and entactogens
