= 4-AcO-DiPT =

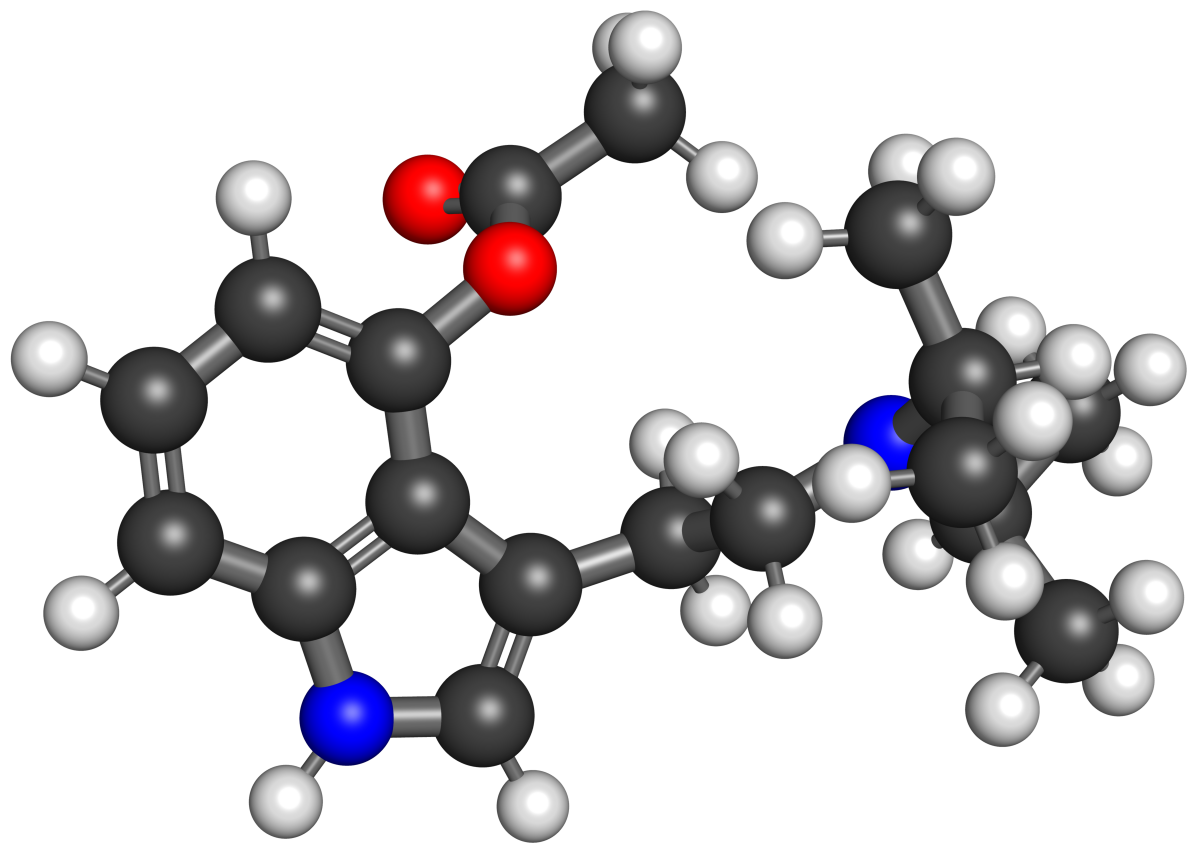

Clinical data
- Other names: 4-Acetoxy-DiPT; 4-Acetoxy-N,N-diisopropyltryptamine
- Routes of administration: Oral
- Drug class: Non-selective serotonin receptor agonist; Serotonin 5-HT_{2A} receptor agonist; Serotonergic psychedelic; Hallucinogen
- ATC code: None

Pharmacokinetic data
- Metabolites: 4-HO-DiPT
- Onset of action: 30–45 minutes
- Duration of action: 3.5 hours

Identifiers
- IUPAC name: 3-{2-[di(propan-2-yl)amino]ethyl}-1H-indol-4-yl acetate
- CAS Number: 936015-60-0
- PubChem CID: 24801868
- ChemSpider: 21106240
- UNII: XV36ISE3YQ
- CompTox Dashboard (EPA): DTXSID30239482

Chemical and physical data
- Formula: C_{18}H_{26}N_{2}O_{2}
- Molar mass: 302.418 g·mol^{−1}
- 3D model (JSmol): Interactive image
- SMILES: CC(C)N(CCc1c[nH]c2c1c(ccc2)OC(=O)C)C(C)C
- InChI: InChI=1S/C18H26N2O2/c1-12(2)20(13(3)4)10-9-15-11-19-16-7-6-8-17(18(15)16)22-14(5)21/h6-8,11-13,19H,9-10H2,1-5H3; Key:ZPAOVGZYDSXCPK-UHFFFAOYSA-N

4-AcO-DiPT, also known as 4-acetoxy-N,N-diisopropyltryptamine or as ipracetin, is a psychedelic drug of the tryptamine and 4-hydroxytryptamine families related to 4-AcO-DMT (psilacetin). It is taken orally.

The drug is thought to likely be a prodrug of 4-HO-DiPT, which acts as a non-selective serotonin receptor agonist including of the serotonin 5-HT_{2A} receptor. It produces psychedelic-like effects in animals.

4-AcO-DiPT was first described in the literature by 1999. It was encountered as a novel designer drug in 2005.

== Use and effects ==
According to Alexander Shulgin in a 2003 literature review, the dose range of 4-AcO-DiPT is 6 to 10 mg orally. For comparison, the dose range of 4-HO-DiPT is listed as 15 to 20 mg in the same review. Other reports of the properties and effects of 4-AcO-DiPT in humans have also been reported in The Entheogen Review. The effects of 4-AcO-DiPT are said to be essentially identical to those of 4-HO-DiPT. A wider dose range of 15 to 40 mg orally has also been reported. Its onset is said to be 30 to 45 minutes, peak effects occur after 1.5 hours, and its duration is said to be approximately 3.5 hours.

== Pharmacology ==
=== Pharmacodynamics ===
4-AcO-DiPT is thought to be likely to function as prodrug of 4-HO-DiPT, although pharmacokinetic studies are still needed to confirm this. It acts as a serotonin 5-HT_{2} receptor agonist, albeit with greatly reduced potency relative to 4-HO-DiPT. The drug produces the head-twitch response, a behavioral proxy of psychedelic effects, in rodents.

== Chemistry ==
4-AcO-DiPT is a tryptamine and is structurally similar to 4-HO-DiPT, psilocin (4-HO-DMT), and 4-AcO-DMT (psilacetin).

=== Analogues ===
Analogues of 4-AcO-DiPT include diisopropyltryptamine (DiPT), 4-HO-DiPT (iprocin), 4-PrO-DiPT, luvesilocin (4-GO-DiPT), 4-AcO-DMT (psilacetin), 4-AcO-DET (ethacetin), 4-AcO-DPT (depracetin), and 4-AcO-DALT (dalcetin), among others.

== History ==
4-AcO-DiPT was first described in the literature by 1999. Subsequently, it was described by Alexander Shulgin in 2003. The drug was encountered as a novel designer drug in 2005.

== Society and culture ==
=== Legal status ===
==== Denmark ====
4-AcO-DiPT is added to the list of Schedule B controlled substances.

==== Japan ====
4-AcO-DiPT is a controlled substance in Japan.

==== Sweden ====
Sveriges riksdags health ministry Statens folkhälsoinstitut classified 4-AcO-DiPT as "health hazard" under the act Lagen om förbud mot vissa hälsofarliga varor (translated Act on the Prohibition of Certain Goods Dangerous to Health) as of Mar 1, 2005, in their regulation SFS 2005:26 listed as 4-acetoxi-N,N-diisopropyltryptamin (4-AcO-DIPT), making it illegal to sell or possess.

==== United States ====
4-AcO-DiPT is an unscheduled substance in the United States. Due to similarities to other scheduled tryptamines, such as diethyltryptamine and psilocin, possession may be prosecuted under the Federal Analog Act in the United States.

== See also ==
- Substituted tryptamine
