= 4-HO-DiPT =

Chemical compound

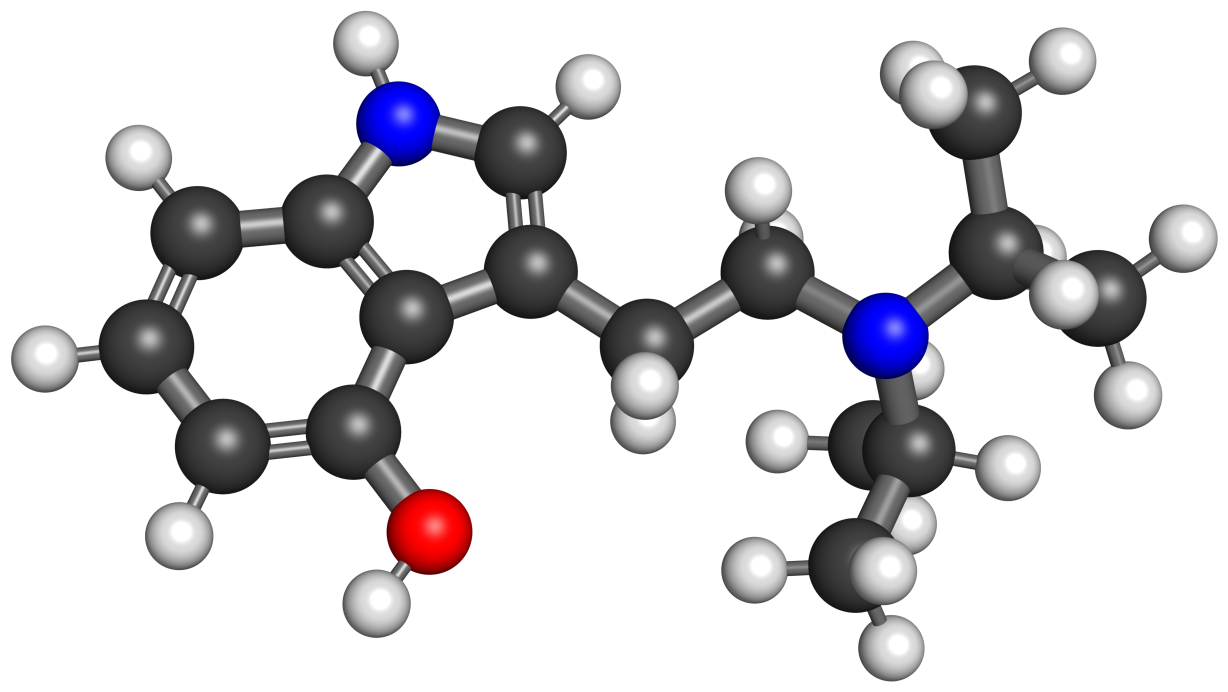

Clinical data
- Other names: 4-OH-DiPT; 4-Hydroxy-N,N-diisopropyltryptamine; Iprocin
- Routes of administration: Oral
- Drug class: Non-selective serotonin receptor agonist; Serotonin 5-HT_{2A} receptor agonist; Serotonergic psychedelic; Hallucinogen
- ATC code: None

Legal status
- Legal status: DE: NpSG (Industrial and scientific use only); UK: Class A; US: Unscheduled

Pharmacokinetic data
- Onset of action: 15–20 minutes Luvesilocin: ≤1 hour
- Elimination half-life: Luvesilocin (s.c.): 2.7–4.1 h (as 4-HO-DiPT)
- Duration of action: 2–3 hours Luvesilocin (s.c.): 3.6 hours (range ~3–4 hours)

Identifiers
- IUPAC name: 3-[2-(diisopropylamino)ethyl]-1H-indol-4-ol
- CAS Number: 132328-45-1; HCl: 63065-90-7
- PubChem CID: 21854225
- ChemSpider: 10579819
- UNII: YG9OUS518B; HCl: KE76PMQ2P3
- CompTox Dashboard (EPA): DTXSID50618836
- ECHA InfoCard: 100.214.853

Chemical and physical data
- Formula: C_{16}H_{24}N_{2}O
- Molar mass: 260.381 g·mol^{−1}
- 3D model (JSmol): Interactive image
- SMILES: CC(C)N(CCc1c[nH]c2cccc(O)c12)C(C)C
- InChI: InChI=1S/C16H24N2O/c1-11(2)18(12(3)4)9-8-13-10-17-14-6-5-7-15(19)16(13)14/h5-7,10-12,17,19H,8-9H2,1-4H3; Key:KBRYKXCBGISXQV-UHFFFAOYSA-N

4-HO-DiPT, also known as 4-hydroxy-N,N-diisopropyltryptamine or as iprocin, is a psychedelic drug of the tryptamine and 4-hydroxytryptamine families related to psilocin (4-HO-DMT). It is taken orally. The drug has an unusually fast onset, short duration, and narrow dose range. Among orally administered psychedelics, it is one of the shortest-acting compounds known.

It acts as a non-selective serotonin receptor agonist, including of the serotonin 5-HT_{2A} receptor. Unlike many other psychedelic tryptamines, the drug appears to have far lower potency as an agonist of the serotonin 5-HT_{2C} receptor relative to the serotonin 5-HT_{2A} receptor. It is a derivative of DiPT, a higher homologue of psilocin (4-HO-DMT) and 4-HO-DET, and a skeletal isomer of 4-HO-DPT.

4-HO-DiPT was first described in the scientific literature by 1977. It was later described in greater detail by Alexander Shulgin in his 1997 book TiHKAL (Tryptamines I Have Known and Loved). The drug was encountered as a novel designer drug by 2005. In the 2020s, a prodrug of 4-HO-DiPT known as luvesilocin (RE-104, FT-104; 4-GO-DiPT) was developed and is in clinical trials for the treatment of psychiatric disorders such as postpartum depression.

== Use and effects ==
In his book TiHKAL (Tryptamines I Have Known and Loved) and other publications, Alexander Shulgin reported that 4-HO-DiPT had a dose range of 15 to 20 mg orally and a duration of 2 to 3 hours. However, a wider dose range of 3 to 30 mg or more orally has also been reported. Shulgin has stated that 4-HO-DiPT has an especially steep dose–response curve and narrow dose range, with doses below 10 mg producing few to no effects and doses of more than 20 mg having not been tested due to the intensity of its effects. He personally found that a 20 mg dose produced an intense plus-three experience on the Shulgin Rating Scale that "flirted with" the magical plus-four transcendental peak experience. The drug's onset of action is 15 to 20 minutes and peak effects occur after 20 to 30 minutes. Shulgin has stated that he "truly doubt[s] that there is another psychedelic drug, anywhere, that can match [4-HO-DiPT] for speed, for intensity, for brevity, and [sensitivity] to dose, at least one that is active orally." However, ASR-3001 (5-MeO-iPALT), a more recent psychedelic, may be slightly faster than 4-HO-DiPT.

The effects of 4-HO-DiPT have been reported to include introspective changes, insights and realizations, mild object distortion, slight color effects, rainbow halos around objects, very little in the way of closed-eye visuals, little in terms of psychedelic visuals or sensory changes in general, mild stimulation, mild elation, light tension, orgasmic enhancement, and powerful religious-esque experiences. Other effects included sensations of muscle loosening, leg tremors, chill-like sensations, and vague body malaise. Shulgin has stated that he doubts that 4-HO-DiPT could be distinguished from psilocin (4-HO-DMT) in any blinded clinical study. Due to its rapid onset and short duration among other qualities, 4-HO-DiPT has been described as a "good 'novice' introduction to hallucinogens".

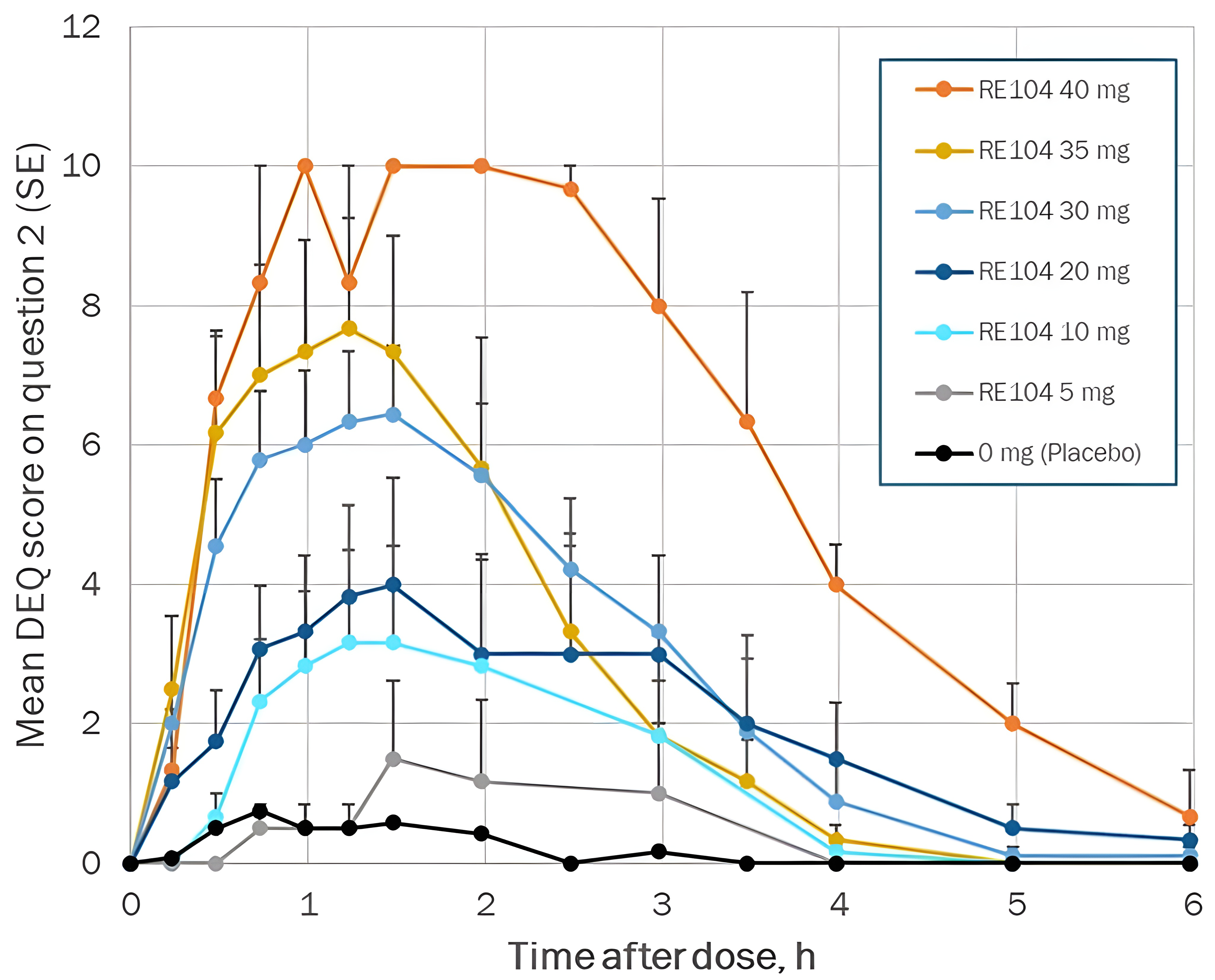
Luvesilocin (RE104; 4-GO-DiPT) Drug Effects Questionnaire (DEQ) "feel high" ratings at doses of 5 to 40 mg (equivalent to ~4–32 mg 4-HO-DiPT) via subcutaneous injection over 6 hours.

The effects of 4-HO-DiPT have been clinically studied in the form of its prodrug luvesilocin (RE-104; FT-104; 4-GO-DiPT). Luvesilocin was evaluated at doses of 5 to 40 mg (equivalent to ~4–32 mg 4-HO-DiPT) by subcutaneous injection in this study. It was specifically assessed in terms of modified Drug Effects Questionnaire (DEQ) ratings, Mystical Experience Questionnaire (MEQ) ratings, and adverse effects.

== Pharmacology ==
=== Pharmacodynamics ===
4-HO-DiPT activities
Target	Affinity (K_{i}, nM)
5-HT_{1A}	5,700–>10,000 (K_{i}); 1,147–3,900 (EC_{50}); 36–70% (E_{max})
5-HT_{1B}	>10,000 (K_{i}); 597–>10,000 (EC_{50}); 95% (E_{max})
5-HT_{1D}	1,860 (K_{i}); 496–8,827 (EC_{50}); 64–124% (E_{max})
5-HT_{1E}	>10,000 (K_{i}); 852–>10,000 (EC_{50}); 79% (E_{max})
5-HT_{1F}	ND (K_{i}); 557 (EC_{50}) <20–59% (E_{max})
5-HT_{2A}	120–922 (K_{i}); 6.8–334^{a} (EC_{50}); 74–106% (E_{max})
5-HT_{2B}	85 (K_{i}); 5.1–460 (EC_{50}); 55–110% (E_{max})
5-HT_{2C}	2.8–>10,000 (K_{i}); 180–6,442 (EC_{50}); 72–104%^{a} (E_{max})
5-HT_{3}	ND
5-HT_{4}	ND (K_{i}) >10,000 (EC_{50}); IA (E_{max})
5-HT_{5A}	>10,000 (K_{i}); 243–5,074 (EC_{50}); 56–66% (E_{max})
5-HT_{6}	>10,000 (K_{i}); 697–2,415 (EC_{50}); 55–56% (E_{max})
5-HT_{7}	>10,000 (K_{i}); ND (EC_{50}) <20% (E_{max})
α_{1A}	>12,000
α_{1B}, α_{1D}	ND
α_{2A}	15,000
α_{2B}, α_{2C}	>10,000
β_{1}–β_{3}	ND
D_{1}–D_{3}	>25,000
D_{4}, D_{5}	>10,000
H_{1}	9,800–>10,000
H_{2}	>10,000
H_{3}, H_{4}	ND
M_{1}–M_{3}	ND
M_{4}	1,725
M_{5}	ND
I_{1}	ND
σ_{1}	816–1,063
σ_{2}	2,215
KOR	>10,000
NR2B	>10,000
TAAR1	>15,000 (K_{i}) (mouse) >15,000 (K_{i}) (rat); ND (EC_{50}) (human)
SERT	419–1,800 (K_{i}); 163–2,400 (IC_{50}); IA (EC_{50})
NET	11,000 (K_{i}); 46,000 (IC_{50}); IA (EC_{50})
DAT	>26,000 (K_{i}) >100,000 (IC_{50}); IA (EC_{50})
Notes: The smaller the value, the more avidly the drug binds to the site. All proteins are human unless otherwise specified. Footnotes: ^{a} = Stimulation of IP_{1} formation. Refs:

4-HO-DiPT acts as an agonist of serotonin receptors, including the serotonin 5-HT_{2A} and 5-HT_{2B} receptors. It may also act as a serotonin reuptake inhibitor, although its potency is variable across studies. The drug appears to activate the serotonin 5-HT_{2C} receptor with low potency and much lower than for the serotonin 5-HT_{2A} receptor. However, in another study, it was only about 2.5-fold more potent as an agonist of the serotonin 5-HT_{2A} receptor relative to the serotonin 5-HT_{2C} receptor. The drug activates other serotonin receptors with lower potency as well. Unlike many other tryptamines, 4-HO-DiPT is not a ligand of the rodent trace amine-associated receptor 1 (TAAR1).

The drug has been found to produce the head-twitch response, a behavioral proxy of psychedelic effects, in rodents. In addition, it has fully efficacious anti-inflammatory effects in preclinical research. 4-HO-DiPT has also been found to produce enhance fear extinction and produce anxiolytic-like effects in rodents.

=== Pharmacokinetics ===
The pharmacokinetics of 4-HO-DiPT have been studied. The elimination half-life of 4-HO-DiPT in humans when given in the form of its prodrug luvesilocin (4-GO-DiPT) by subcutaneous injection has been found to range from 2.7 to 4.1 hours. The average experience duration was 3.6 hours at a dose of 30 mg in the study.

== Chemistry ==
4-HO-DiPT, also known as 4-hydroxy-N,N-diisopropyltryptamine, is a substituted tryptamine. It is a synthetic analogue of the neurotransmitter serotonin (5-hydroxytryptamine; 5-HT) and of the naturally occurring serotonergic psychedelics psilocin (4-HO-DMT) and psilocybin (4-PO-DMT).

=== Synthesis ===
The chemical synthesis of 4-HO-DiPT has been described.

=== Analogues ===
4-HO-DiPT is closely related to analogues including diisopropyltryptamine (DiPT), 5-MeO-DiPT, psilocin (4-HO-DMT), 4-HO-DET (ethocin), 4-HO-MET (metocin), 4-HO-MiPT (miprocin), 4-HO-DPT (deprocin), 4-HO-MPT (meprocin), 4-HO-DALT (dalocin), 4-HO-MALT (malocin), and 5-HO-DiPT, among others. 4-AcO-DiPT (ipracetin), 4-PrO-DiPT, and luvesilocin (4-GO-DiPT) are ester prodrugs of 4-HO-DiPT.

== History ==
4-HO-DiPT was first described in the scientific literature by David Repke and colleagues in 1977. Subsequently, its effects in humans were described by Alexander Shulgin in his 1997 book TiHKAL (Tryptamines I Have Known and Loved). The drug was encountered as a novel designer drug in Europe by 2005. Luvesilocin (4-GO-DiPT), a prodrug of 4-HO-DiPT, was first described in 2021.

== Society and culture ==
=== Legal status ===
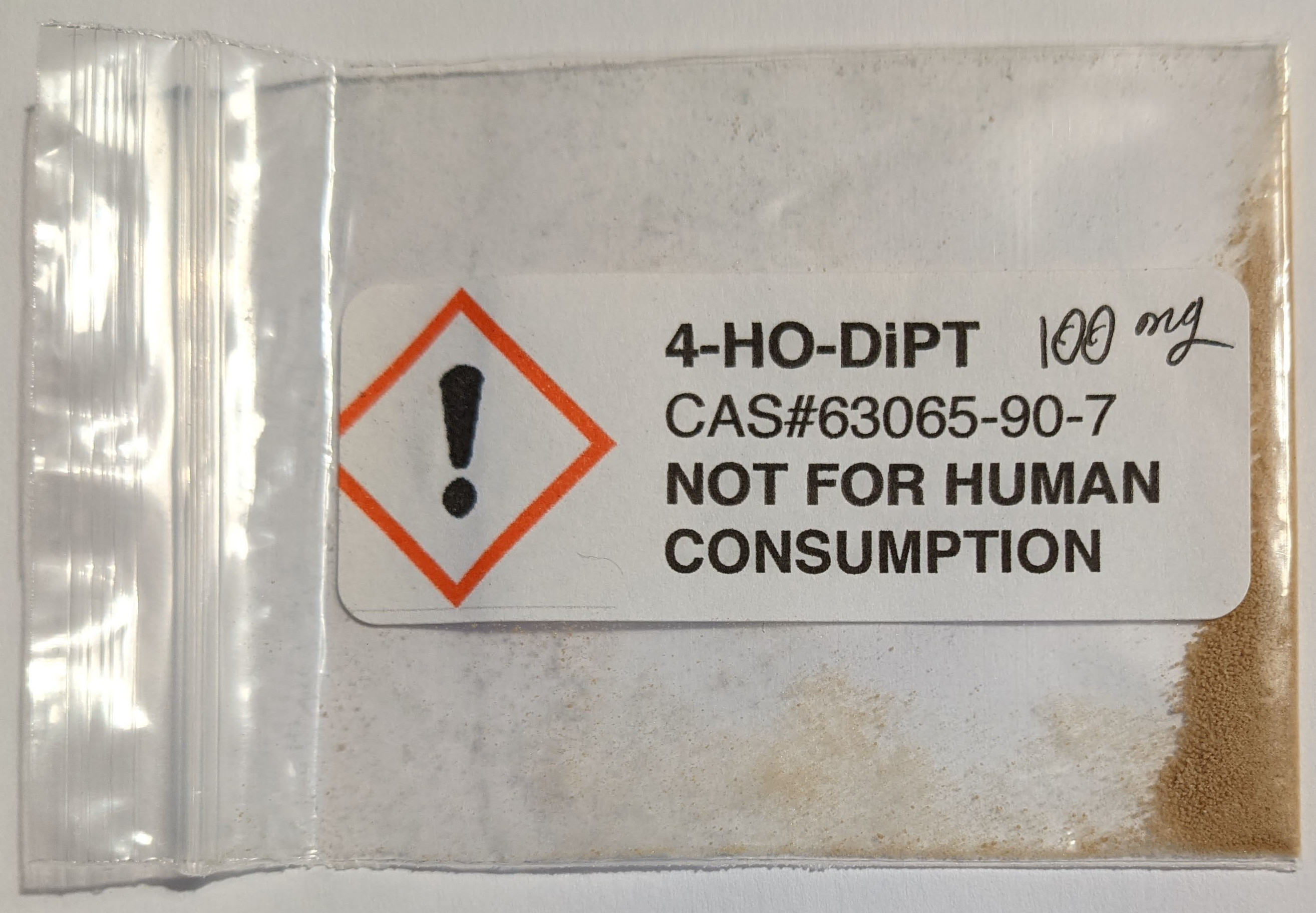
4-HO-DiPT powder.

==== Canada ====
4-HO-DiPT is not a controlled substance in Canada as of 2025.

==== Finland ====
Scheduled in government decree on psychoactive substances banned from the consumer market.

==== Germany ====
Scheduled in New Psychoactive Substances Act (NpSG). Use of covered substances is permitted only for industrial and scientific purposes.

==== Sweden ====
Sveriges riksdags health ministry Statens folkhälsoinstitut classified 4-HO-DiPT as "health hazard" under the act Lagen om förbud mot vissa hälsofarliga varor (translated Act on the Prohibition of Certain Goods Dangerous to Health) as of Mar 1, 2005, in their regulation SFS 2005:26 listed as 4-hydroxi-N,N-diisopropyltryptamin (4-HO-DIPT), making it illegal to sell or possess.

==== United States ====
4-HO-DiPT is not scheduled at the federal level in the United States, but it is possible that it could be considered an analogue of psilocin (4-HO-DMT) or 5-MeO-DiPT, in which case purchase, sale, or possession could be prosecuted under the Federal Analog Act. The United States Drug Enforcement Administration (DEA) proposed scheduling 4-HO-DiPT in January 2022, but due to an effective public response, it withdrew its proposal in July 2022.

===== Florida =====
"4-Hydroxy-N,N-diisopropyltryptamine" is a Schedule I controlled substance in the state of Florida making it illegal to buy, sell, or possess in Florida.

== Research ==
=== Luvesilocin ===
Luvesilocin (RE-104, FT-104; 4-GO-DiPT), a prodrug of 4-HO-DiPT.

Luvesilocin (developmental code names RE-104, FT-104; O-glutaryl-4-HO-DiPT or 4-GO-DiPT), a prodrug of 4-HO-DiPT, has entered phase 2 clinical trials for treatment of psychiatric conditions such as postpartum depression and treatment-resistant depression.

== See also ==
- Substituted tryptamine
- List of investigational hallucinogens and entactogens
- ASR-3001 (5-MeO-iPALT)
