= 4-PrO-DiPT =

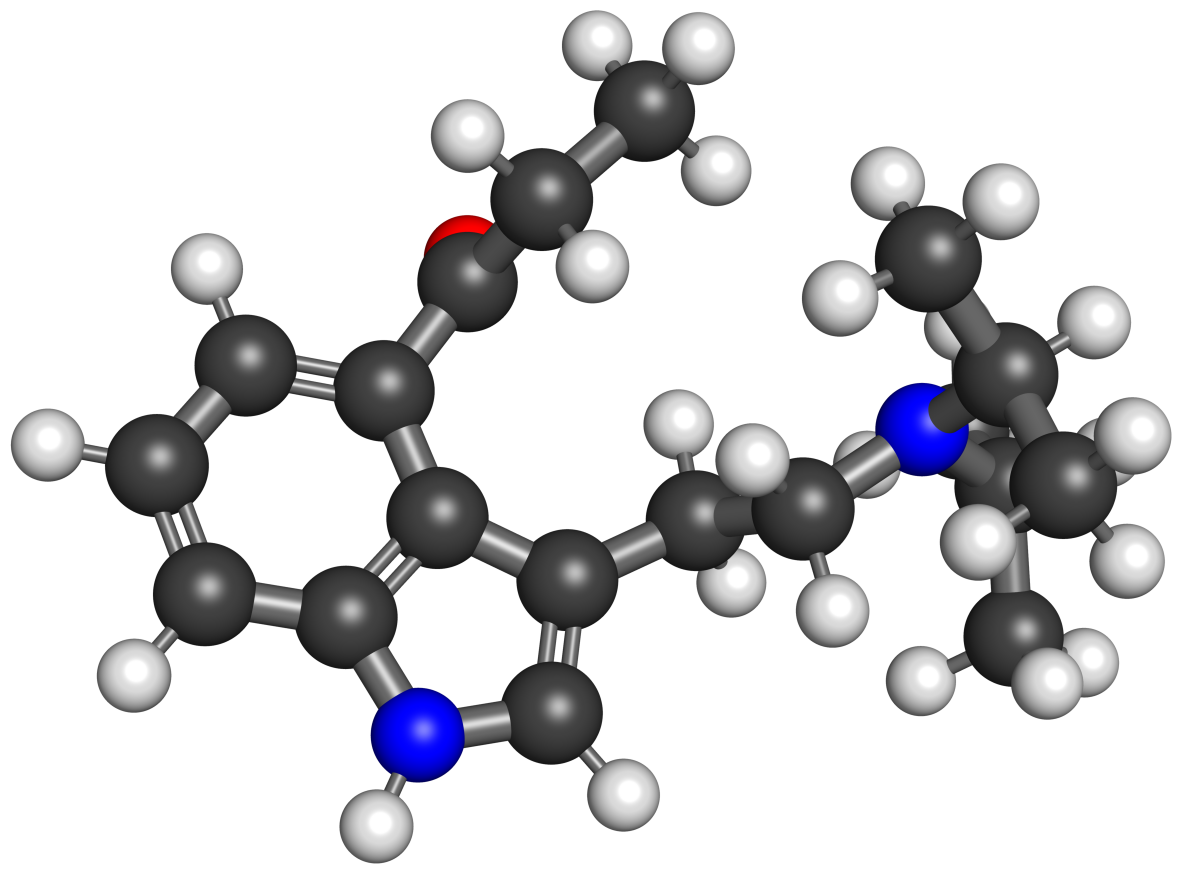

Clinical data
- Other names: 4-Propanoyl-N,N-diisopropyltryptamine; O-Propionyl-4-HO-DiPT
- Routes of administration: Oral
- Drug class: Serotonergic psychedelic; Hallucinogen
- ATC code: None

Identifiers
- IUPAC name: [3-[2-[di(propan-2-yl)amino]ethyl]-1H-indol-4-yl] propanoate
- CAS Number: 1373882-13-3
- PubChem CID: 164541104

Chemical and physical data
- Formula: C_{19}H_{28}N_{2}O_{2}
- Molar mass: 316.445 g·mol^{−1}
- 3D model (JSmol): Interactive image
- SMILES: CCC(=O)OC1=CC=CC2=C1C(=CN2)CCN(C(C)C)C(C)C
- InChI: InChI=1S/C19H28N2O2/c1-6-18(22)23-17-9-7-8-16-19(17)15(12-20-16)10-11-21(13(2)3)14(4)5/h7-9,12-14,20H,6,10-11H2,1-5H3; Key:ZLPHTTIBHPAOOZ-UHFFFAOYSA-N

4-PrO-DiPT, also known as 4-propanoyl-N,N-diisopropyltryptamine or as O-propionyl-4-HO-DiPT, is a psychedelic drug of the tryptamine and 4-hydroxytryptamine families related to 4-PrO-DMT. It is the O-propionate ester of 4-HO-DiPT and has been encountered as a novel designer drug. The drug was first described in the scientific literature by at least 2021.

== Chemistry ==
=== Analogues ===
Analogues of 4-PrO-DiPT include 4-HO-DiPT (iprocin), 4-AcO-DiPT (ipracetin), luvesilocin (4-GO-DiPT), 4-PrO-DMT, 4-PrO-MET, and 4-GO-DMT, among others.

== Society and culture ==
=== Legal status ===
==== Canada ====
4-PrO-DiPT is not a controlled substance in Canada as of 2025.

== See also ==
- Substituted tryptamine
