= CT-4201 =

Clinical data
- Other names: CT4201
- Drug class: Non-selective serotonin receptor agonist; Serotonin 5-HT_{2A} receptor agonist; Serotonergic psychedelic; Hallucinogen
- ATC code: None

CT-4201 is a serotonergic psychedelic which is under development for the treatment of major depressive disorder. It is a prodrug of the tryptamine psychedelic psilocin that is said to have improved pharmacokinetic properties compared to psilocybin, the primary active constituent of psilocybin-containing mushrooms. CT-4201 is being developed by CaaMTech. As of November 2024, it is in the preclinical research stage of development.

== See also ==
- Substituted tryptamine
- List of investigational hallucinogens and entactogens
- EB-002, MSP-1014, RE-109 (4-GO-DMT)
- Luvesilocin (4-GO-DiPT)
