= 4-PrO-DMT =

Chemical compound

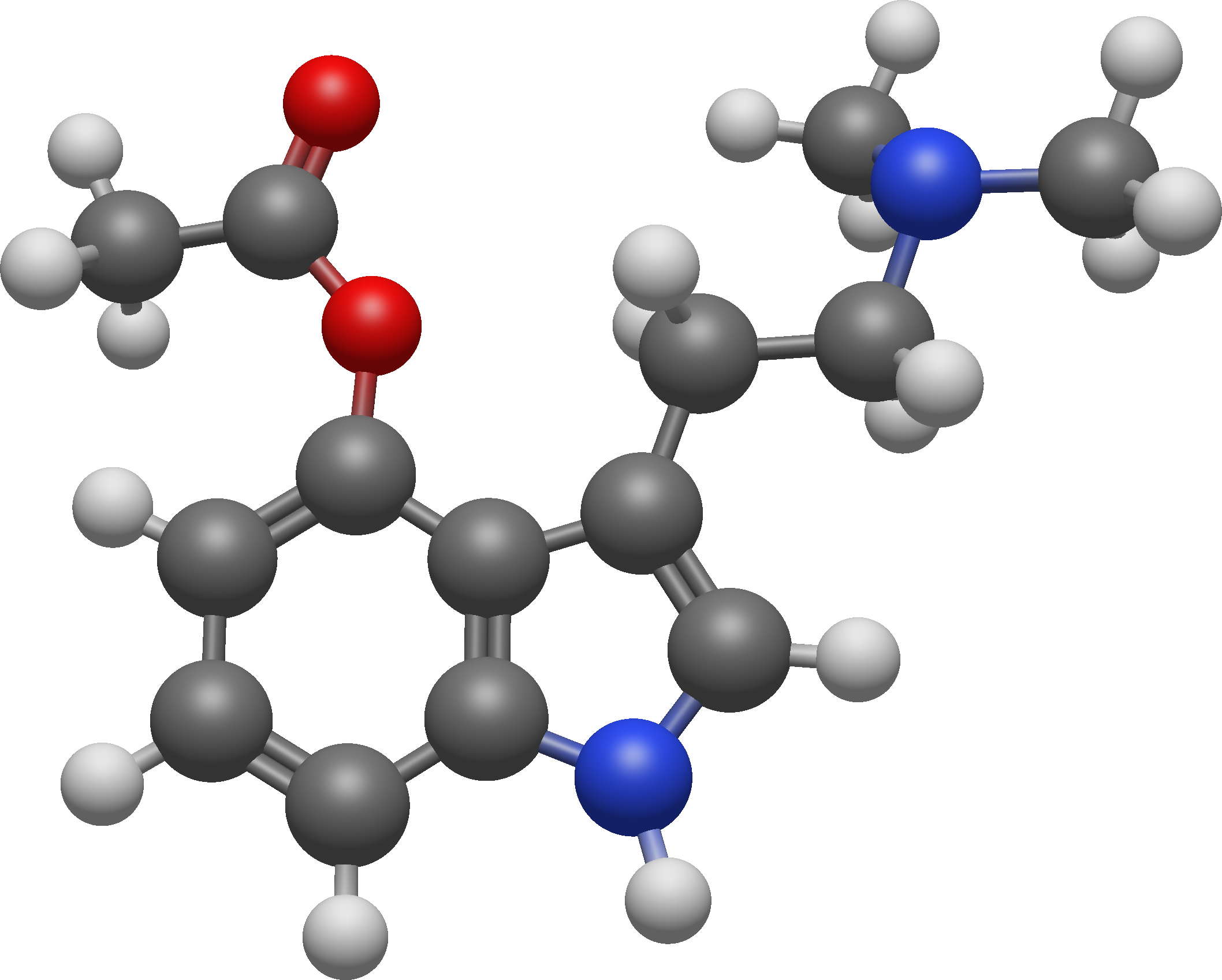

Clinical data
- Other names: 4-Propionyloxy-N,N-dimethyltryptamine; 4-Propionyloxy-DMT; 4-Propanoyloxy-DMT; O-Propionylpsilocin
- Routes of administration: Oral
- Drug class: Non-selective serotonin receptor agonist; Serotonin 5-HT_{2A} receptor agonist; Serotonergic psychedelic; Hallucinogen

Identifiers
- IUPAC name: [3-[2-(dimethylamino)ethyl]-1H-indol-4-yl] propanoate
- CAS Number: 1373882-11-1
- PubChem CID: 155907598
- ChemSpider: 84400449
- UNII: B9BF25HPH4
- CompTox Dashboard (EPA): DTXSID501336912

Chemical and physical data
- Formula: C_{15}H_{20}N_{2}O_{2}
- Molar mass: 260.337 g·mol^{−1}
- 3D model (JSmol): Interactive image
- SMILES: CCC(=O)OC1=CC=CC2=C1C(=CN2)CCN(C)C
- InChI: InChI=1S/C15H20N2O2/c1-4-14(18)19-13-7-5-6-12-15(13)11(10-16-12)8-9-17(2)3/h5-7,10,16H,4,8-9H2,1-3H3; Key:KUOGXPDQORRHED-UHFFFAOYSA-N

4-PrO-DMT, also known as 4-propionyloxy-N,N-dimethyltryptamine or as O-propionylpsilocin, is a synthetic psychedelic drug of the tryptamine family with psychedelic that is believed to act as a prodrug of psilocin (4-HO-DMT). It has been sold online as a designer drug since May 2019. It was first identified as a new psychoactive substance in Sweden, in July 2019. A number of related derivatives have been synthesized as prodrugs of psilocin for medical applications.

== Use and effects ==
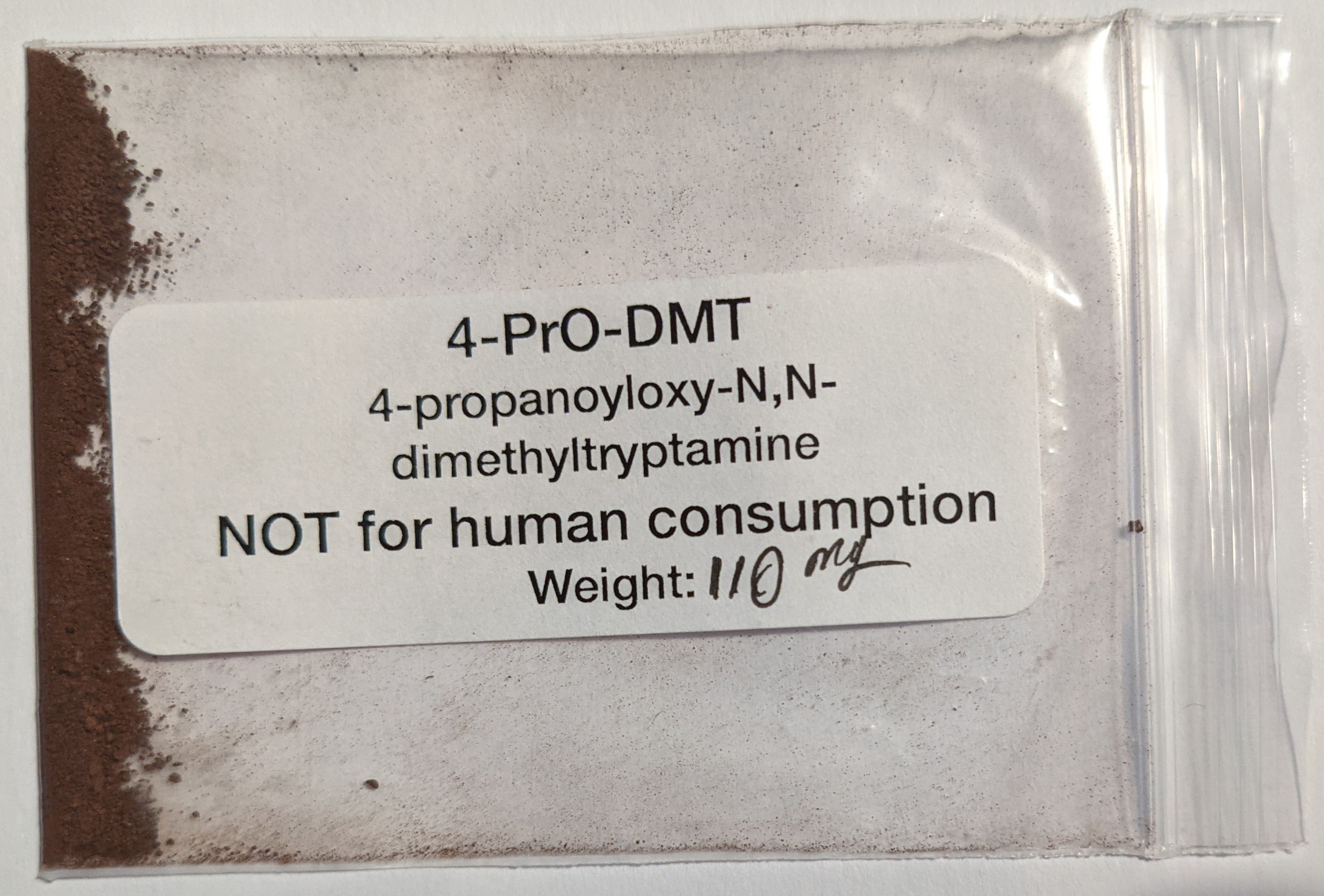
4-PrO-DMT crystals.

4-PrO-DMT is reported to be orally active and while effects have been studied in mice, its effects and longevity on humans have not been formally studied. The effects of 4-PrO-DMT are similar to those of psilocin (4-HO-DMT), as it acts as a prodrug of this compound. This is analogous to the case of 4-AcO-DMT and psilocybin (4-PO-DMT).

== Toxicity ==
Very little data about the toxicity or pharmacology of 4-PrO-DMT is known. Its chemical structure and pharmacological activity are similar to psilacetin, a compound which isn't associated with compulsive use or physical dependence. However, due to lack of research and data, it cannot be definitively concluded that its pharmacological actions in the human body do not differ from those of psilacetin. To date, there have been no reported deaths from 4-PrO-DMT.

== Pharmacology ==
=== Pharmacodynamics ===
Psilocin at molecular targets
Target	Affinity (K_{i}, nM)
5-HT_{1A}	49–567 (K_{i}); 130–>3,160 (EC_{50}); 0.7%–96% (E_{max})
5-HT_{1B}	31–305
5-HT_{1D}	19–36
5-HT_{1E}	44–52
5-HT_{1F}	ND
5-HT_{2A}	6.0–340 (K_{i}); 2.4–3,836 (EC_{50}); 16–98% (E_{max})
5-HT_{2B}	4.6–410 (K_{i}); 2.4–>20,000 (EC_{50}); 1.4–84% (E_{max})
5-HT_{2C}	10–141 (K_{i}); 9.1–30 (EC_{50}); 86–95% (E_{max})
5-HT_{3}	>10,000
5-HT_{4}	ND
5-HT_{5A}	70–84
5-HT_{6}	57–72
5-HT_{7}	3.5–72
α_{1A}–α_{1B}	>10,000
α_{2A}	1,379–2,044
α_{2B}	1,271–1,894
α_{2C}	4,404
β_{1}–β_{2}	>10,000
D_{1}	20–>14,000
D_{2}	3,700–>10,000
D_{3}	101–8,900
D_{4}	>10,000
D_{5}	>10,000
H_{1}	1,600–>10,000
H_{2}–H_{4}	>10,000
M_{1}–M_{5}	>10,000
σ_{1}	>10,000
σ_{2}	>10,000
I_{2}	792
TAAR1	1,400 (K_{i}) (rat); 17,000 (K_{i}) (mouse); 920–2,700 (EC_{50}) (rodent) >30,000 (EC_{50}) (human)
SERT	3,650–>10,000 (K_{i}); 662–3,900 (IC_{50}); 561 (EC_{50}); 54% (E_{max})
NET	13,000 (K_{i}); 14,000 (IC_{50}) >10,000 (EC_{50})
DAT	6,000–>30,000 (K_{i}) >100,000 (IC_{50}) >10,000 (EC_{50})
Notes: The smaller the value, the more avidly psilocin interacts with the site. Sources:

4-PrO-DMT is theorized to be a serotonergic psychedelic, and is partial agonist of the 5-HT_{1D}, 5-HT_{1B} and 5-HT_{1A} serotonin receptors. It produces the head-twitch response in mice.

== Chemistry ==
=== Analogues ===
Analogues of 4-PrO-DMT include 4-HO-DMT (psilocin), 4-AcO-DMT (psilacetin), 4-PrO-DiPT, 4-GO-DMT, luvesilocin (4-GO-DiPT), and psilocybin (4-PO-DMT), among others.

== History ==
4-PrO-DMT was encountered as a novel designer drug online and in Sweden by 2019.

== Society and culture ==
=== Legal status ===
==== Canada ====
4-PrO-DMT is not a controlled substance in Canada as of 2025.

==== Sweden ====
4-PrO-DMT is a controlled substance in Sweden.

==== United States ====
4-PrO-DMT is not an explicitly controlled substance in the United States. However, it could be considered a controlled substance under the Federal Analogue Act if intended for human consumption.

== See also ==
- Substituted tryptamine
