= EB-002 =

Clinical data
- Other names: EB002; EB-373; EB373; Synthetic psilocin prodrug
- Routes of administration: Oral
- Drug class: Non-selective serotonin receptor agonist; Serotonin 5-HT_{2A} receptor agonist; Serotonergic psychedelic; Hallucinogen

EB-002, also formerly known as EB-373, is a synthetic prodrug of the non-selective serotonin receptor agonist and serotonergic psychedelic psilocin which is under development for the treatment of neuropsychiatric disorders like depression and anxiety disorders. It is taken orally. The drug is under development by Enveric Biosciences. As of November 2024, it is in the preclinical research stage of development. In November 2024, Enveric Biosciences out-licensed EB-002 to MycoMedica Life Sciences in a deal that was estimated to be worth as much as $62 million. Its exact chemical structure does not yet appear to have been disclosed.

== See also ==
- Substituted tryptamine
- List of investigational hallucinogens and entactogens
- CT-4201, MSP-1014, and RE-109 (4-GO-DMT)
- Luvesilocin (4-GO-DiPT)
