= RE-109 =

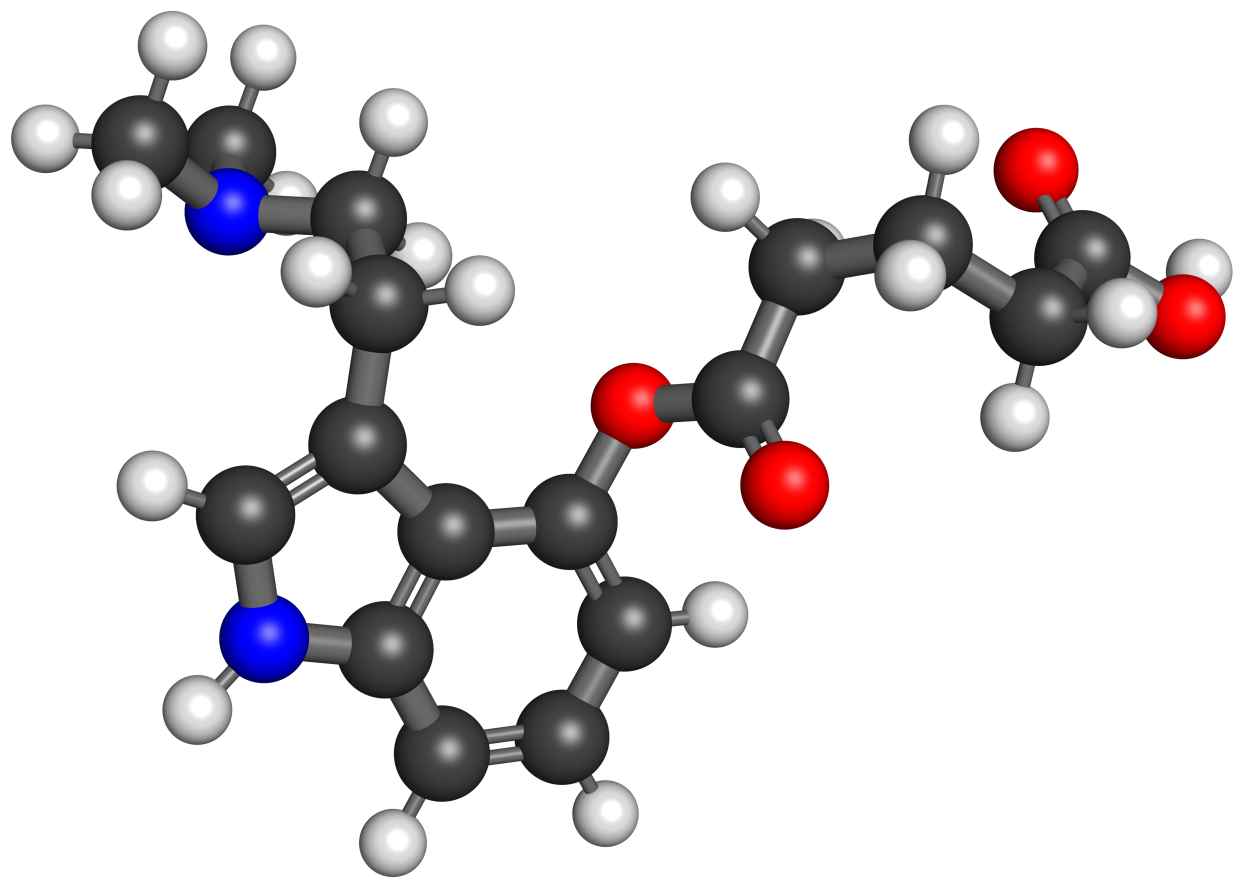

Clinical data
- Other names: Psilocin glutarate; Psilocin O-glutarate; RE109; RE-109; 4-Glutaryloxy-N,N-dimethyltryptamine; 4-HO-DMT O-glutarate; 4-GO-DMT; DMT-4-glutarate
- Drug class: Non-selective serotonin receptor agonist; Serotonin 5-HT_{2A} receptor agonist; Serotonergic psychedelic; Hallucinogen

Identifiers
- IUPAC name: 5-[[3-[2-(dimethylamino)ethyl]-1H-indol-4-yl]oxy]-5-oxopentanoic acid
- PubChem CID: 162510633

Chemical and physical data
- Formula: C_{17}H_{22}N_{2}O_{4}
- Molar mass: 318.373 g·mol^{−1}
- 3D model (JSmol): Interactive image
- SMILES: CN(C)CCC1=CNC2=C1C(=CC=C2)OC(=O)CCCC(=O)O
- InChI: InChI=1S/C17H22N2O4/c1-19(2)10-9-12-11-18-13-5-3-6-14(17(12)13)23-16(22)8-4-7-15(20)21/h3,5-6,11,18H,4,7-10H2,1-2H3,(H,20,21); Key:GIDBNBKWKCJUNZ-UHFFFAOYSA-N

O-Glutarylpsilocin (developmental code name RE109), also known as 4-glutaryloxy-N,N-dimethyltryptamine (4-HO-DMT O-glutarate or 4-GO-DMT) is a serotonergic psychedelic of the tryptamine family. It acts as a prodrug of psilocin (4-HO-DMT) similarly to other psilocin prodrugs like 4-AcO-DMT, 4-PrO-DMT, and psilocybin (4-PO-DMT). The drug is cleaved into psilocin by non-specific esterases. O-Glutarylpsilocin was first described in the scientific literature in 2024. It has been patented by Reunion Neuroscience. A related drug, luvesilocin (RE-104, FT-104; 4-GO-DiPT), a prodrug of 4-HO-DiPT, is being developed for potential medical use.

== See also ==
- Substituted tryptamine
- List of investigational hallucinogens and entactogens
- CT-4201
- EB-002
- MSP-1014
