= Drug Effects Questionnaire =

Assessing the effects of drugs

The Drug Effects Questionnaire (DEQ), also known as the Drug Effect Questionnaire, is a psychometric questionnaire which is used to assess the subjective effects of psychoactive drugs. It is a visual analogue scale (VAS). The questionnaire is used to quickly measure whether a subject feels the drug, "feels high", likes or dislikes the effects, and whether they want more of the drug. The format of the DEQ is often modified and varies widely across studies, such that it cannot easily be regarded as a standardized instrument. The DEQ has notably been used to assess the subjective effects of serotonergic psychedelics in clinical trials. It was first described in the literature by 1961.

== See also ==
- List of hallucinogen scales
