= MSP-1014 =

Psychedelic drug

Clinical data
- Other names: MSP1014; MSP-1014.OX
- Routes of administration: Oral
- Drug class: Serotonin receptor agonist; Serotonin 5-HT_{2A} receptor agonist; Serotonergic psychedelic; Hallucinogen

MSP-1014 is a serotonergic psychedelic which is under development for the treatment of major depressive disorder, other depressive disorders, and anxiety disorders.

It is a prodrug of psilocin similarly to psilocybin, and hence acts as a non-selective serotonin receptor agonist, including of the serotonin 5-HT_{2A} receptor. The animal pharmacodynamics and pharmacokinetics of MSP-1014 have been studied, demonstrating a shorter plasma half-life compared to psilocybin.

The drug is under development by Mindset Pharma and Otsuka America Pharmaceutical. As of January 2024, it is in phase 2 clinical trials for major depressive disorder and is in the preclinical stage of development for anxiety disorders and other depressive disorders. The chemical structure of MSP-1014 does not yet seem to have been disclosed. However, Mindset Pharma patented psilocin derivatives and prodrugs in 2022.

== See also ==
- Substituted tryptamine
- List of investigational hallucinogens and entactogens
- CT-4201, EB-002, and RE-109 (4-GO-DMT)
- Luvesilocin (4-GO-DiPT)
- MSP-2020
