= Psilocin =

Psychedelic drug

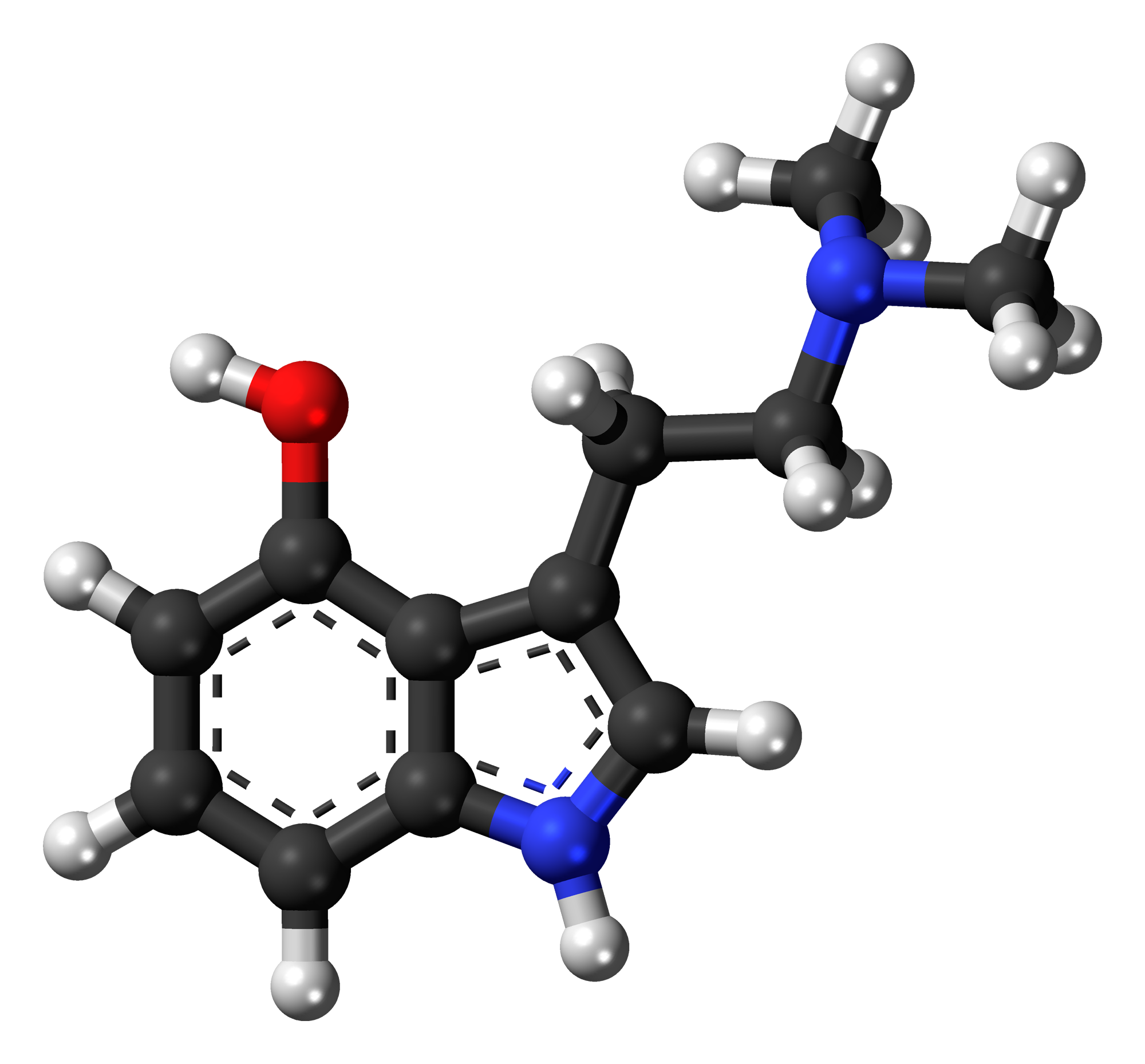

Clinical data
- Other names: Psilocine; Psilocyn; Psilotsin; 4-Hydroxy-N,N-dimethyltryptamine; 4-Hydroxy-DMT; 4-Hydroxy-N,N-DMT; 4-HO-DMT; 4-OH-DMT; PSOH; PAL-153; PAL153; CX-59; CX59
- Routes of administration: Oral, intravenous
- Drug class: Serotonergic psychedelic; Hallucinogen; Serotonin receptor agonist; Serotonin 5-HT_{2A} receptor agonist
- ATC code: None

Legal status
- Legal status: AU: S9 (Prohibited substance); BR: Class F2 (Prohibited psychotropics); CA: Schedule III; DE: Anlage I (Authorized scientific use only); NZ: Class A; UK: Class A; US: Schedule I; UN: Psychotropic Schedule I

Pharmacokinetic data
- Bioavailability: Oral psilocybin: 52.7 ± 20.4% (as psilocin)
- Metabolism: Liver, other tissues: • Demethylation and deamination (MAO) • Oxidation (ALDH) • Glucuronidation (UGTs)
- Metabolites: • Psilocin-O-glucuronide • 4-Hydroxy-indole-3-acetaldehyde • 4-Hydroxyindole-3-acetic acid (4-HIAA) • 4-Hydroxytryptophol
- Onset of action: 15–40 minutes
- Elimination half-life: Oral psilocybin: 2.3–3 hours (as psilocin); IV psilocybin: 1.2 hours (as psilocin)
- Duration of action: 3–6 hours
- Excretion: Urine (mainly as psilocin-O-glucuronide, 2–4% unchanged)

Identifiers
- IUPAC name: 3-[2-(dimethylamino)ethyl]-1H-indol-4-ol
- CAS Number: 520-53-6
- PubChem CID: 4980
- IUPHAR/BPS: 11291
- ChemSpider: 4807
- UNII: CMS88KUW0G
- KEGG: C08312
- ChEBI: CHEBI:8613
- ChEMBL: ChEMBL65547
- CompTox Dashboard (EPA): DTXSID5048899
- ECHA InfoCard: 100.007.543

Chemical and physical data
- Formula: C_{12}H_{16}N_{2}O
- Molar mass: 204.273 g·mol^{−1}
- 3D model (JSmol): Interactive image
- Melting point: 173 to 176 °C (343 to 349 °F)
- SMILES: CN(C)CCc1c[nH]c2cccc(O)c12
- InChI: InChI=1S/C12H16N2O/c1-14(2)7-6-9-8-13-10-4-3-5-11(15)12(9)10/h3-5,8,13,15H,6-7H2,1-2H3; Key:SPCIYGNTAMCTRO-UHFFFAOYSA-N

Psilocin, also known as 4-hydroxy-N,N-dimethyltryptamine (4-HO-DMT), is a psychedelic drug and fungal alkaloid of the tryptamine and 4-hydroxytryptamine families. Along with its phosphate ester psilocybin, it is found in most species of psilocybin-containing mushrooms, such as Psilocybe cubensis and Psilocybe mexicana, and is the compound responsible for their hallucinogenic effects, although concentrations of psilocin are variably lower than those of psilocybin. The drug is taken orally and its effects include perceptual changes and visual effects, emotional changes, ego dissolution, time dilation, and mystical experiences, among others. Synthetic acyl esters such as 4-AcO-DMT (psilacetin; O-acetylpsilocin) and 4-PrO-DMT (O-propionylpsilocin), are prodrugs of psilocin and have similar properties and effects. More recently, MSP-1014 has emerged as a novel prodrug of psilocin under development for the treatment of major depressive disorder.

Psilocin acts as a non-selective serotonin receptor agonist, including of the serotonin 5-HT_{2A} receptor among others. The drug produces its hallucinogenic effects specifically via activation of the serotonin 5-HT_{2A} receptor. However, other serotonin receptors, such as the serotonin 5-HT_{1A} and 5-HT_{2C} receptors, may also contribute to its effects. Notable analogues of psilocin include dimethyltryptamine (DMT), its positional isomer bufotenin (5-HO-DMT), its higher homologue 4-HO-MET (metocin), and others.

Psilocin and psilocybin were discovered via isolation from psilocybin-containing mushrooms by Albert Hofmann in 1958. This followed the Western re-discovery of psilocybin-containing mushrooms by Robert Gordon Wasson and Valentina Pavlovna Wasson in Mexico in 1955. Psilocin, in the form of psilocybin, psilocybin-containing mushrooms, and other prodrugs such as 4-AcO-DMT, is a widely used entheogen as well as recreational psychedelic drug. Psilocybin and psilocin became controlled substances in the United States and internationally under the United Nations in 1971. Since then, psilocin, as the active form of psilocybin, has become of interest for potential use in medicine to treat psychiatric disorders such as depression. Psilocybin was approved for such purposes in Australia in 2023 and is in late-stage clinical trials in the United States and other countries.

== Use and effects ==
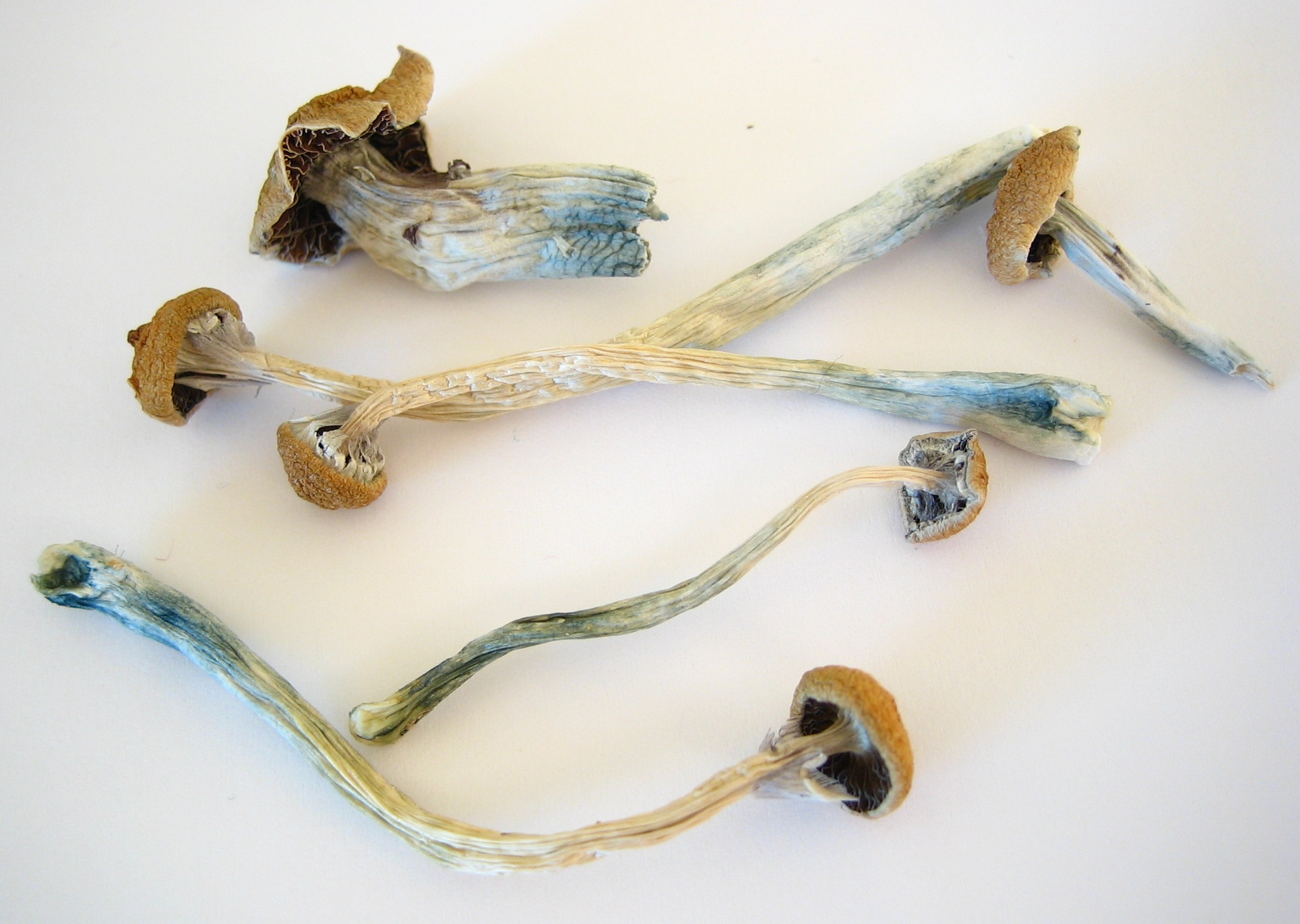
Dried psilocybin mushrooms. (Notice the characteristic blue bruising by the stems of the mushrooms.)

Psilocin is used recreationally, spiritually or shamanically, and medically. It is most commonly used in the form of its prodrugs such as psilocybin and 4-AcO-DMT (psilacetin). However, psilocin may also be used itself, either in the form of psilocybin-containing mushrooms (which variably contain psilocin up to similar amounts as psilocybin) or in synthetic form.

Psilocin is usually used orally, but may also be taken intravenously. In terms of dose, it is slightly more potent than psilocybin, about 1.4-fold so (i.e., 1.4 mg psilocybin equals about 1.0 mg psilocin). This is related to psilocin's lack of ester prodrug moiety, which results in its molecular weight being about 40% lower than that of psilocybin (204 g/mol and 284 g/mol, respectively). The human dose of psilocin has been given as 10 to 20 mg orally.

In his book TiHKAL (Tryptamines I Have Known and Loved), Alexander Shulgin described the properties and effects of psilocin, either as psilocin itself, as a prodrug like psilocybin or 4-AcO-DMT, or as Psilocybe cubensis mushrooms. The dose, regardless of form, was listed as 10 to 20 mg orally and the duration as 3 to 6 hours. The onset, in the case of psilocin specifically, was 15 to 40 minutes. The perceptual and related effects included brightened colors, increased visual contrast, closed-eye visuals such as patterns, textures, and colors, open-eye visuals such as colors, distortions, and movement, pareidolia, increased appreciation of scenery, perceiving beauty, and enhanced imagination. Other effects variably included feeling intoxicated, high, and/or stimulated, feelings of peacefulness and serenity, emotional amplification, mood swings, feelings of neuroticism and introversion, feelings of despair, apathy, and unpleasantness, anxiety, confusion, distractibility, impairment, and feeling heavy and tired. Side effects included chills, nausea, vomiting, and motion sickness, but no hangover.

In other reports, the effects observed after ingestion of psilocin can include but are not limited to tachycardia, dilated pupils, restlessness or arousal, euphoria, open and closed eye visuals (common at medium to high doses), synesthesia (e.g. hearing colors and seeing sounds), increased body temperature, headache, sweating and chills, and nausea.

== Side effects ==
There has been no direct lethality associated with psilocin. There has been no reported withdrawal syndrome when chronic use of this drug is ceased. There is cross tolerance among psilocin, mescaline, lysergic acid diethylamide (LSD), and other psychedelics due to downregulation of these receptors.

== Pharmacology ==
=== Pharmacodynamics ===
Psilocin at molecular targets
Target	Affinity (K_{i}, nM)
5-HT_{1A}	49–567 (K_{i}); 130–>3,160 (EC_{50}); 0.7%–96% (E_{max})
5-HT_{1B}	31–305
5-HT_{1D}	19–36
5-HT_{1E}	44–52
5-HT_{1F}	ND
5-HT_{2A}	6.0–340 (K_{i}); 2.4–3,836 (EC_{50}); 16–98% (E_{max})
5-HT_{2B}	4.6–410 (K_{i}); 2.4–>20,000 (EC_{50}); 1.4–84% (E_{max})
5-HT_{2C}	10–141 (K_{i}); 9.1–30 (EC_{50}); 86–95% (E_{max})
5-HT_{3}	>10,000
5-HT_{4}	ND
5-HT_{5A}	70–84
5-HT_{6}	57–72
5-HT_{7}	3.5–72
α_{1A}–α_{1B}	>10,000
α_{2A}	1,379–2,044
α_{2B}	1,271–1,894
α_{2C}	4,404
β_{1}–β_{2}	>10,000
D_{1}	20–>14,000
D_{2}	3,700–>10,000
D_{3}	101–8,900
D_{4}	>10,000
D_{5}	>10,000
H_{1}	1,600–>10,000
H_{2}–H_{4}	>10,000
M_{1}–M_{5}	>10,000
σ_{1}	>10,000
σ_{2}	>10,000
I_{2}	792
TAAR1	1,400 (K_{i}) (rat); 17,000 (K_{i}) (mouse); 920–2,700 (EC_{50}) (rodent) >30,000 (EC_{50}) (human)
SERT	3,650–>10,000 (K_{i}); 662–3,900 (IC_{50}); 561 (EC_{50}); 54% (E_{max})
NET	13,000 (K_{i}); 14,000 (IC_{50}) >10,000 (EC_{50})
DAT	6,000–>30,000 (K_{i}) >100,000 (IC_{50}) >10,000 (EC_{50})
Notes: The smaller the value, the more avidly psilocin interacts with the site. Sources:

Psilocin is the pharmacologically active agent in the body after ingestion of psilocybin or some species of psychedelic mushrooms. Psilocybin is rapidly dephosphorylated in the body to psilocin which acts as a serotonin 5-HT_{2A}, 5-HT_{2C} and 5-HT_{1A} receptor agonist or partial agonist. Psilocin exhibits functional selectivity in that it activates phospholipase A2 instead of activating phospholipase C as the endogenous ligand serotonin does. Psilocin is structurally similar to serotonin (5-hydroxytryptamine), differing only by the hydroxyl group being on the 4-position rather than the 5 and the dimethyl groups on the nitrogen. Its effects are thought to come from its agonist activity at 5-HT_{2A} receptors in the prefrontal cortex. Psilocin's psychedelic effects are directly correlated with the drug's occupancy at these receptor sites. The drug shows pronounced biased agonism at the serotonin 5-HT_{2C} receptor. Psilocin has no significant effect on dopamine receptors and only affects the noradrenergic system at very high doses.

Psilocin has been reported to act as a highly potent positive allosteric modulator of the tropomyosin receptor kinase B (TrkB), one of the receptors of brain-derived neurotrophic factor (BDNF). However, subsequent studies failed to reproduce these findings and instead found no interaction of psilocin with TrkB.

The cryo-EM structures of the serotonin 5-HT_{2A} receptor with psilocin, as well as with various other psychedelics and serotonin 5-HT_{2A} receptor agonists, have been solved and published by Bryan L. Roth and colleagues.

=== Pharmacokinetics ===
Psilocin's elimination half-life ranges from 1 to 3 hours depending on route of administration of psilocybin.

== Chemistry ==
Psilocin, also known as 4-hydroxy-N,N-dimethyltryptamine (4-HO-DMT), is a tryptamine derivative. It is closely structurally related to the neurotransmitter serotonin (which is 5-hydroxytryptamine, also known as 5-HT or 5-HO-T), as well as to the naturally occurring psychedelics dimethyltryptamine (N,N-dimethyltryptamine; DMT) and bufotenin (5-hydroxy-N,N-DMT; 5-HO-DMT). Psilocybin is psilocin's O-phosphate ester (4-phosphoryloxy-N,N-DMT; 4-PO-DMT).

=== Synthesis ===
The chemical synthesis of psilocin has been described. It can be obtained by dephosphorylation of psilocybin under strongly acidic or under alkaline conditions (hydrolysis). A synthetic route uses the Speeter–Anthony tryptamine synthesis procedure. First, 4-hydroxyindole is Friedel-Crafts-acylated with oxalyl chloride in position 3. The compound is further reacted with dimethylamine, yielding the indole-3-yl-glyoxamide. Finally, this 4-hydroxyindole-3-N,N-dimethylglyoxamide is reduced by lithium aluminum hydride yielding psilocin.

=== Stability ===
Psilocin is relatively unstable in solution due to its phenolic hydroxy (-OH) group. In the presence of oxygen, it readily forms bluish and dark black degradation products. Similar products are also formed in the presence of oxygen and Fe^{3+} ions.

=== Analogues ===
Analogues of psilocin (4-HO-DMT) include dimethyltryptamine (DMT), 4-hydroxytryptamine (4-HT or 4-HO-T), norpsilocin (4-HO-NMT), 4-HO-TMT, 4-HO-MET (metocin), 4-HO-DET (ethocin), 4-HO-MPT (meprocin), 4-HO-DPT (deprocin), 4-HO-MiPT (miprocin), 4-HO-DiPT (diprocin), 4-MeO-DMT, and 5-MeO-DMT, among others.

A number of ester prodrugs of psilocin are known, such as psilocybin (4-PO-DMT), 4-AcO-DMT, and 4-PrO-DMT. Psilocybin is the O-phosphate ester of psilocin, while 4-AcO-DMT is the O-acetyl ester and 4-PrO-DMT is the O-propionyl ester. Another ester is 4-GO-DMT (4-HO-DMT O-glutarate; RE109), which is related to luvesilocin (4-GO-DiPT; RE104). Analogues of psilocin prodrugs include norbaeocystin (4-PO-T), baeocystin (4-PO-NMT), aeruginascin (4-PO-TMT), and ethocybin (4-PO-DET), among others.

Bufotenin (5-HO-DMT), 6-HO-DMT, and 7-HO-DMT are positional isomers of psilocin.

1-Methylpsilocin is a serotonin 5-HT_{2C} receptor-preferring agonist. 4-Fluoro-DMT and 4-methyl-DMT are known. Another analogue of psilocin is 1-isopropyl-6-fluoropsilocin (O-4310).

Sulfur analogues of psilocin are known with a benzothienyl replacement as well as 4-SH-DMT.

A deuterated isotopologue of psilocin is deupsilocin (d_{10}-psilocin; HLP003; CYB003).

== History ==
Psilocin and its phosphorylated cousin, psilocybin, were first isolated and named in 1958 by Swiss chemist Albert Hofmann. He obtained the chemicals from laboratory-grown specimens of the hallucinogenic mushroom Psilocybe mexicana. Hofmann also succeeded in finding synthetic routes to these chemicals.

== Society and culture ==
=== Legal status ===
==== United Nations ====
Psilocin is a Schedule I drug under the Convention on Psychotropic Substances. The United Nations Convention on Psychotropic Substances (adopted in 1971) requires its members to prohibit psilocybin, and parties to the treaty are required to restrict the use of the drug to medical and scientific research under strictly controlled conditions.

==== Australia ====
Psilocin is considered a Schedule 9 prohibited substance in Australia under the Poisons Standard (October 2015). A Schedule 9 substance is a substance which may be abused or misused, the manufacture, possession, sale or use of which should be prohibited by law except when required for medical or scientific research, or for analytical, teaching or training purposes with approval of Commonwealth and/or State or Territory Health Authorities.

==== Canada ====
Psilocin is a Schedule III controlled substance in Canada.

==== Russia ====
Psilocin and psilocybin are banned in Russia, due to their status as narcotic drugs, with a criminal penalty for possession of more than 50 mg.

==== United States ====
Psilocin is a Schedule I controlled substance in the United States since 1971.

== Research ==
Psilocin is being evaluated under the developmental code name PLZ-1015 for the treatment of pervasive developmental disorders like autism in children. Its prodrug psilocybin is also being studied for treatment of depression and a variety of other conditions.

== See also ==
- Substituted tryptamine
