= Serotonin receptor agonist =

Neurotransmission-modulating substance

The neurotransmitter serotonin (illustration) has various receptors.

A serotonin receptor agonist is an agonist of one or more serotonin receptors. They activate serotonin receptors in a manner similar to that of serotonin (5-hydroxytryptamine; 5-HT), a neurotransmitter and hormone and the endogenous ligand of the serotonin receptors.

== Non-selective agonists ==
Serotonergic psychedelics such as tryptamines (e.g., psilocybin, psilocin, DMT, 5-MeO-DMT, bufotenin), lysergamides (e.g., LSD, ergine (LSA)), phenethylamines (e.g., mescaline, 2C-B, 25I-NBOMe), and amphetamines (e.g., MDA, DOM) are non-selective agonists of serotonin receptors. Their hallucinogenic effects are specifically mediated by activation of the 5-HT_{2A} receptor.

Drugs that increase extracellular serotonin levels such as serotonin reuptake inhibitors (e.g., fluoxetine, venlafaxine), serotonin releasing agents (e.g., fenfluramine, MDMA), and monoamine oxidase inhibitors (e.g., phenelzine, moclobemide) are indirect non-selective serotonin receptor agonists. They are used variously as antidepressants, anxiolytics, antiobsessionals, appetite suppressants, and entactogens.

== 5-HT_{1} receptor agonists ==
=== 5-HT_{1A} receptor agonists ===
Azapirones such as buspirone, gepirone, and tandospirone are 5-HT_{1A} receptor partial agonists marketed primarily as anxiolytics, but also as antidepressants. The antidepressants vilazodone and vortioxetine are 5-HT_{1A} receptor partial agonists. Flibanserin, a drug used for female sexual dysfunction, is a 5-HT_{1A} receptor partial agonist. Many atypical antipsychotics, such as aripiprazole, asenapine, clozapine, lurasidone, quetiapine, and ziprasidone, are 5-HT_{1A} receptor partial agonists, and this action is thought to contribute to their beneficial effects on negative symptoms in schizophrenia.

=== 5-HT_{1B} receptor agonists ===
Triptans such as sumatriptan, rizatriptan, and naratriptan are 5-HT_{1B} receptor agonists that are used to abort migraine and cluster headache attacks. The ergoline antimigraine agent ergotamine also acts on this receptor.

Serenics such as batoprazine, eltoprazine, and fluprazine are agonists of the 5-HT_{1B} receptor and other serotonin receptors, and have been found to produce antiaggressive effects in animals, but have not been marketed. Eltoprazine is under development for the treatment of aggression and for other indications.

=== 5-HT_{1D} receptor agonists ===
In addition to being 5-HT_{1B} agonists, triptans (i.e. sumatriptan, almotriptan, zolmitriptan, naratriptan, eletriptan, frovatriptan and rizatriptan) are also agonists at the 5-HT_{1D} receptor, which contributes to their antimigraine effect caused by vasoconstriction of blood vessels in the brain. The same is true for ergotamine.

=== 5-HT_{1E} receptor agonists ===
The triptan eletriptan is an agonist of the 5-HT_{1E} receptor. BRL-54443 is a selective 5-HT_{1E} and 5-HT_{1F} receptor agonist which is used in scientific research.

=== 5-HT_{1F} receptor agonists ===
Triptans such as eletriptan, naratriptan, and sumatriptan are agonists of the 5-HT_{1F} receptor. Lasmiditan is a selective 5-HT_{1F} agonist that is under development by Eli Lilly and Company for the treatment of migraine.

== 5-HT_{2} receptor agonists ==
=== 5-HT_{2A} receptor agonists ===
Serotonergic psychedelics like psilocybin, LSD, and mescaline act as 5-HT_{2A} receptor agonists. Their actions at this receptor are thought to be responsible for their hallucinogenic effects. Most of these drugs also act as agonists of other serotonin receptors. Not all 5-HT_{2A} receptor agonists are psychoactive.

The 25-NB (NBOMe) series is a family of phenethylamine serotonergic psychedelics that, unlike other classes of serotonergic psychedelics, act as highly selective 5-HT_{2A} receptor agonists. The most well-known member of the 25-NB series is 25I-NBOMe. (2S,6S)-DMBMPP is an analogue of the 25-NB compounds and is the most highly selective agonist of the 5-HT_{2A} receptor that has been identified to date. O-4310 (1-isopropyl-6-fluoropsilocin) is a tryptamine derivative that is a highly selective agonist of the 5-HT_{2A} receptor.

Selective 5-HT_{2A} receptor agonists like the 25-NB compounds, specifically those which can behave as full agonists at this receptor, can cause serotonin syndrome-like adverse effects such as hyperthermia, hyperpyrexia, tachycardia, hypertension, clonus, seizures, agitation, aggression, and hallucinations which has ended in death on numerous occasions despite these particular drugs only being available to drug users for about 2–3 years, being widely in use mostly in the period from 2010-2012. Bans were put in place around 2012-2013 by countries where they had risen to popularity. They quickly and often accidentally lead to overdose. In contrast to the aforementioned drugs's potent, selective, and most importantly, full agonism (meaning the drug can fully activate the receptor to 100% of its activation potential, and does so even with minuscule amounts due to high potency, LSD, like the other "safe" psychedelics which are almost impossible to overdose fatally on, is a partial agonist, and this means it has a limit of how much it can activate the receptor, a limit which is basically impossible to exceed even with exponentially larger amounts of the drug. These partial agonists have proven relatively safe after having seen widespread abuse by drug users for many decades. Activation of the 5-HT_{2A} receptor is also implicated in serotonin syndrome caused by indirect serotonin receptor agonists like serotonin reuptake inhibitors, serotonin releasing agents, and monoamine oxidase inhibitors. Antagonists of the 5-HT_{2A} receptor like cyproheptadine and chlorpromazine are able to reverse and mediate recovery from serotonin syndrome.

=== 5-HT_{2B} receptor agonists ===
Agonists of the 5-HT_{2B} receptor are in the development of cardiac fibrosis. Fenfluramine, pergolide, and cabergoline have been withdrawn from some markets for this reason. Many serotonergic psychedelics, such as LSD and psilocin, have been shown to activate this receptor directly. MDMA has been reported to be both a potent direct agonist and have an indirect effect by increasing plasma serotonin levels.

=== 5-HT_{2C} receptor agonists ===
Lorcaserin is an appetite suppressant and anti-obesity drug which acts as a selective 5-HT_{2C} receptor agonist. meta-Chlorophenylpiperazine (mCPP) is a 5-HT_{2C}-preferring serotonin receptor agonist that induces anxiety and depression and can cause panic attacks in susceptible individuals.

== 5-HT_{3} receptor agonists ==
2-Methyl-5-hydroxytryptamine (2-methylserotonin) and quipazine are moderately selective agonists of the 5-HT_{3} receptor that are used in scientific research. Agonists of this receptor are known to induce nausea and vomiting, and are not used medically.

== 5-HT_{4} receptor agonists ==
Cisapride and tegaserod are 5-HT_{4} receptor partial agonists that were used to treat disorders of gastrointestinal motility. Prucalopride is a highly selective 5-HT_{4} receptor agonist that can be used to treat certain disorders of gastrointestinal motility. Other 5-HT_{4} receptor agonists have shown potential to be nootropic and antidepressant drugs, but have not been marketed for such indications.

== 5-HT_{5} receptor agonists ==
5-HT_{5A} receptor agonists

Valerenic acid, a constituent of valerian root, has been found to act as a 5-HT_{5A} receptor agonist, and this action could be involved in the sleep-promoting effects of valerian.

5-HT_{5B} receptor agonists

5-HT5B receptors are non-functional pseudogenes in humans.

== 5-HT_{6} receptor agonists ==
No selective agonists of the 5-HT_{6} receptor have been approved for medical use. Selective 5-HT_{6} receptor agonists like E-6801, E-6837, EMDT, WAY-181,187, and WAY-208,466 show antidepressant, anxiolytic, antiobsessional, and appetite suppressant effects in animals, but also impair cognition and memory.

== 5-HT_{7} receptor agonists ==
AS-19 is a 5-HT_{7} receptor agonist that has been used in scientific research.

== See also ==
- Serotonin receptor antagonist
- Serotonin releasing agent
