= Des-LSD =

Ergoline ring system numbered and labeled.

LSD chemical structure.

Des-LSD, or LSD with a part removed, may refer to:

- Des-A-LSD
- Des-B-LSD (UCD0068)
- Des-C-LSD
  - 4-Desmethylene-LSD (UCD0179)
  - 10,11-Seco-LSD (UCD0121)
- Des-D-LSD
  - NDTDI (9-desmethine-LSD; 8,10-seco-LSD)

It may also refer to LSD with multiple parts removed:

- Dides-B,C-LSD (UCD0120)
- Dides-C,D-LSD
  - N-DEAOP-NMT (desvinyl-LSD; 9,10-dinor-LSD)
- Trides-B,C,D-LSD
  - N-DEAOP-NMPEA (PEA-NM-NDEPA)
- Trides-A,B,C-LSD
  - THPC (UCD0162)

== See also ==
- Partial lysergamide
- Nor-LSD
- Seco-LSD
