= CT-5252 =

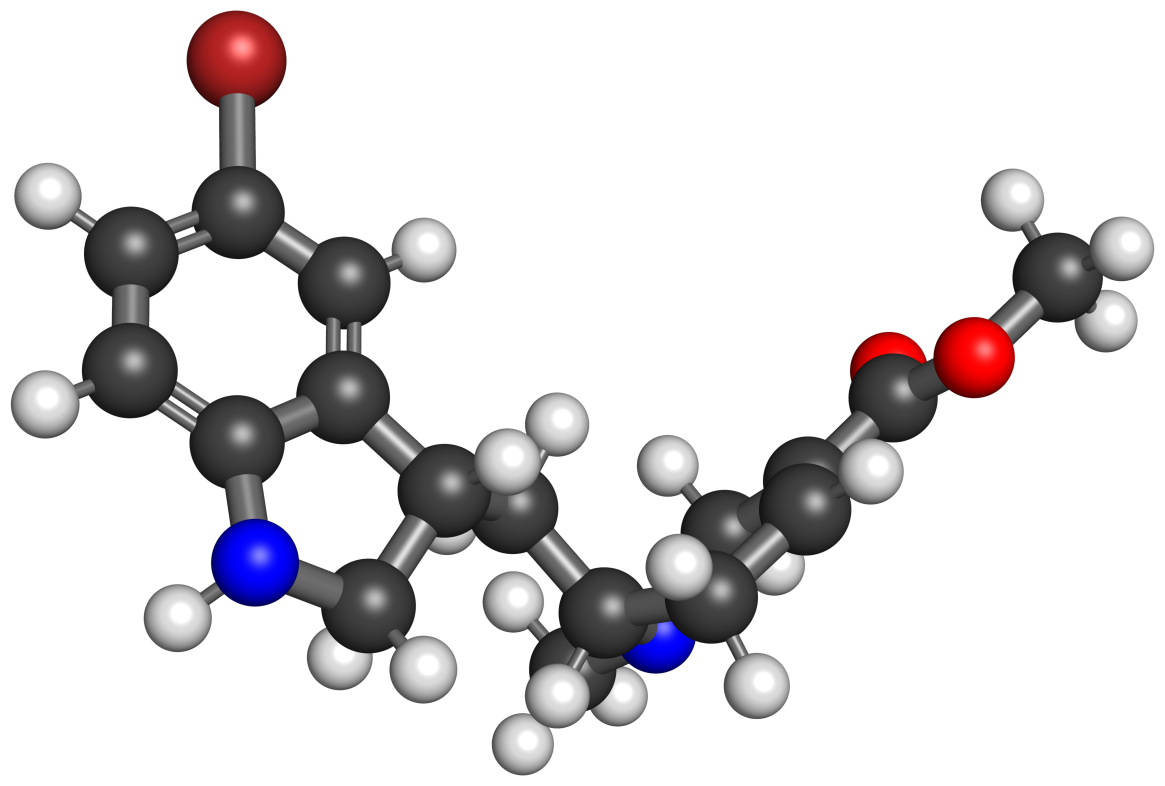

Clinical data
- Other names: CT5252; Methyl-12-bromo-8,9-didehydro-2,3β-dihydro-6-methyl-10,11-secoergoline-8-carboxylate
- Drug class: Simplified/partial LSD analogue
- ATC code: None

Chemical and physical data
- Formula: C_{17}H_{21}BrN_{2}O_{2}
- Molar mass: 365.271 g·mol^{−1}
- 3D model (JSmol): Interactive image
- SMILES: COC(=O)C1=CCC(CC2CNc3ccc(Br)cc23)N(C)C1
- InChI: InChI=1S/C17H21BrN2O2/c1-20-10-11(17(21)22-2)3-5-14(20)7-12-9-19-16-6-4-13(18)8-15(12)16/h3-4,6,8,12,14,19H,5,7,9-10H2,1-2H3; Key:POWSHADSWSCVJU-UHFFFAOYSA-N

CT-5252 is a tryptamine-like less-rigid analogue of lysergic acid diethylamide (LSD). It is a 10,11-secoergoline; that is, an ergoline in which the covalent bond between the 10 and 11 positions of the ergoline ring system has been broken to unconstrain the structure. The drug produces specific LSD-like behavioral changes in guinea pigs but with only about 1/48th the potency of LSD. It also causes seizures at slightly higher doses than those that cause LSD-like effects. CT-5252 was first described in the scientific literature in 1969. The analogue of CT-5252 with an N,N-diethyl-carboxamide moiety on the tetrahydropyridine ring instead of the carboxylate group (i.e., more analogous to LSD) has also been assessed and described.

== See also ==
- Partial lysergamide
- N-DEAOP-NMT
- RU-27849
- RU-28306
- NDTDI
- UCD0179
