= Partial lysergamide =

Class of chemical compounds

The ergoline ring system numbered and labeled.

The chemical structure of LSD, the most well-known lysergamide.

Partial or simplified ergolines and lysergamides, also known as deconstructed LSD analogues, are analogues of ergolines and lysergamides like the psychedelic drug LSD in which one or more atoms or bonds, for instance within the ergoline ring system, have been removed. Additional substitutions may also be added, for instance on the A ring of the ergoline nucleus. It is notable that the ergoline ring system contains embedded tryptamine and phenethylamine moieties within its structure, and so some partial ergolines are simple tryptamines, cyclized tryptamines, simple phenethylamines, and/or cyclized phenethylamines.

In terms of pharmacology, partial lysergamides include serotonin and dopamine receptor agonists. Some, like NDTDI (9-nor-LSD), UCD0120 (dides-B,C-LSD), UCD0179 (4-nor-LSD), and LPH-5 ((S)-2C-TFM-3PIP), are serotonin 5-HT_{2A} receptor agonists and have psychedelic-like and/or psychoplastogenic effects. Some, like 8-OH-DPAT, LY-178210 (LY-228729; 4,α-methylene-5-carboxamido-DPT), Bay R 1531 (LY-197206; 4,α-methylene-5-MeO-DPT), and LY-293284 (4,α-methylene-5-acetyl-DPT), are selective serotonin 5-HT_{1A} receptor agonists. Others, like ropinirole, rotigotine, nolomirole, and RU-28251 (4,α-methylene-DPT), are dopamine D_{2}-like receptor agonists. Though limitedly studied, partial ergolines have generally shown markedly reduced potency in terms of hallucinogen-like effects compared to LSD.

Examples of partial lysergamides that are simple tryptamines include N-DEAOP-NMT (9,10-dinor-LSD) and 5-MeO-N-DEAOP-NMT and examples that are simple phenethylamines include N-DEAOP-NMPEA and 25D-NM-NDEAOP. An example of a cyclized tryptamine-like compound is UCD0179, while examples of cyclized phenethylamines include UCD0120, UCD0120-2C-D, and LPH-5. Some, like 8-OH-DPAT and rotigotine, are 2-aminotetralins. Others, like NDTDI and LY-178210, are tricyclic compounds that contain both tryptamine and phenethylamine components. Tochergamine is a simplified analogue of ergometrine that was studied as an oxytocic agent but was abandoned.

Structures within the ergoline ring system
The tryptamine moiety.

The phenethylamine moiety.

== List of simplified or partial lysergamides ==
Structure	Name	Chemical name	CAS #
	Descarboxylysergic acid (DCLA; 9,10-didehydro-6-methylergoline)	(6aR)-7-methyl-6,6a,8,9-tetrahydro-4H-indolo[4,3-fg]quinoline	51867-17-5
	NDTDI (9-desmethine-LSD; 9-nor-LSD; 8,10-seco-LSD)	N,N-diethyl-3-(methyl(1,3,4,5-tetrahydrobenzo[cd]indol-4-yl)amino)propanamide	?
	RU-28251 (4,α-methylene-DPT)	N,N-dipropyl-1,3,4,5-tetrahydrobenzo[cd]indol-4-amine	?
	Bay R 1531 (LY-197206; 4,α-methylene-5-MeO-DPT)	1,3,4,5-tetrahydro-6-methoxy-N,N-dipropyl-benz[cd]indol-4-amine	98770-54-8
	LY-293284 (4,α-methylene-5-acetyl-DPT)	(4R)-6-acetyl-4-(di-n-propylamino)-1,3,4,5-tetrahydrobenz[c,d]indole	141318-62-9
	LY-178210 (LY-228729; 4,α-methylene-5-carboxamido-DPT)	4-(dipropylamino)-1,3,4,5-tetrahydrobenzo[cd]indole-6-carboxamide	114943-19-0
	LY-301317 ((R)-4,α-methylene-5-(1,3-oxazol-5-yl)-DPT)	(4R)-6-(1,3-oxazol-5-yl)-N,N-dipropyl-1,3,4,5-tetrahydrobenzo[cd]indol-4-amine	?
	RU-28306 (UCD0094; 4,α-methylene-DMT)	N,N-dimethyl-1,3,4,5-tetrahydrobenzo[cd]indol-4-amine	73625-11-3
	6-MeO-RU-28306 (4,α-methylene-5-MeO-DMT)	6-methoxy-N,N-dimethyl-1,3,4,5-tetrahydrobenzo[cd]indol-4-amine	?
	RU-27849 (4,α-methylene-T)	1,3,4,5-tetrahydrobenzo[cd]indol-4-amine	77963-70-3
	FHATHBIN (4,α-methylene-5-HT; 6-HO-RU-27849)	6-hydroxy-1,3,4,5-tetrahydrobenzo[cd]indol-4-amine	?
	6-MeO-RU-27849 (4,α-methylene-5-MT)	6-methoxy-1,3,4,5-tetrahydrobenzo[cd]indol-4-amine	?
	N-DEAOP-NMT (desvinyl-LSD; 9,10-dinor-LSD)	N-(3-diethylamino-3-oxopropyl)-N-methyltryptamine	
	N-DEAOP-NET (desvinyl-ETH-LAD; 9,10-dinor-ETH-LAD)	N-(3-diethylamino-3-oxopropyl)-N-ethyl-5-tryptamine	
	N-DEAOP-5-MeO-NMT	N-(3-diethylamino-3-oxopropyl)-N-methyl-5-methoxytryptamine	
	N-DEAOP-5-MeO-NET	N-(3-diethylamino-3-oxopropyl)-N-ethyl-5-methoxytryptamine	
	10,11-Seco-LSD (UCD0121)	9,10-didehydro-N,N-diethyl-6-methyl-10,11-secoergoline-8β-carboxamide	2640392-96-5
	CT-5252	methyl-12-bromo-8,9-didehydro-2,3β-dihydro-6-methyl-10,11-secoergoline-8-carboxylate	
	10,11-Secoergoline (α,N-tetramethylene-T)	3-(piperidin-2-ylmethyl)-1H-indole	5275-05-8
	FAEFHI	4-(2-aminoethyl)-1H-indol-5-ol	
	4-API	4-(2-aminopropyl)indole	21005-59-4
	DMAI (UCD0076; 4-DMAEI; BD-214)	4-(N,N-dimethylaminoethyl)indole	84401-01-4
	DEAI (4-DEAEI; BD-271)	4-(N,N-diethylaminoethyl)indole	?
	DPAI (4-DPAEI; 2-desoxo-2-ene-ropinirole; BD-179)	4-(N,N-dipropylaminoethyl)indole	76149-15-0
	Ropinirole (SK&F-101468)	4-[2-(dipropylamino)ethyl]-1,3-dihydro-2H-indol-2-one	91374-21-9
	7-Hydroxyropinirole (SK&F-89124)	4-[2-(dipropylamino)ethyl]-7-hydroxy-1,3-dihydroindol-2-one	81654-62-8
	UCD0179 (4-desmethylene-LSD; 4-nor-LSD; 3,5-seco-LSD)	(3R)-N,N-diethyl-5-(1H-indol-4-yl)-1-methyl-3,6-dihydro-2H-pyridine-3-carboxamide	2640392-28-3
	RU-27251 (3,5-secoergoline)	4-piperidin-3-yl-1H-indole	16176-75-3
	WXVL_BT0793LQ2118	6-fluoro-4-(1-methyl-1,2,5,6-tetrahydropyridin-3-yl)-1H-indole	?
	Diaza-2C-DFLY	8-(aminoethyl)-1,5-dihydropyrrolo[2,3-f]indole	
	UCD0120 (dides-B,C-LSD; 1-deaza-2,3,4-trinor-LSD)	N,N-diethyl-1-methyl-5-phenyl-3,6-dihydro-2H-pyridine-3-carboxamide	
	UCD0120-PMA	N,N-diethyl-1-methyl-3-(4-methoxyphenyl)-1,2,5,6-tetrahydropyridine-5-carboxamide	
	UCD0120-M (UCD0120-mescaline)	N,N-diethyl-1-methyl-3-(3,4,5-trimethoxyphenyl)-1,2,5,6-tetrahydropyridine-5-carboxamide	
	UCD0120-NAP	N,N-diethyl-1-methyl-3-(1-naphthyl)-1,2,5,6-tetrahydropyridine-5-carboxamide	
	UCD0120-2C-D	1-methyl-3-(1-oxo-1-diethylaminomethyl)-5-(2,5-dimethoxy-4-methylphenyl)-3,6-dihydro-2H-pyridine	
	"Compound XXIII"	?	?
	2C-B-3PIP	3-(4-bromo-2,5-dimethoxyphenyl)piperidine	?
	LPH-5 ((S)-2C-TFM-3PIP)	(S)-3-(2,5-Dimethoxy-4-(trifluoromethyl)phenyl)piperidine	2641630-97-7
	UCD0068 (des-B-LSD)	N,N-diethyl-4-methyl-2,3,4,4a,5,6-hexahydrobenzo(f)quinoline-2-carboxamide	
	"Compound 25 (R = Me)"	?	?
	Debenzergoline (propyldebenzergoline)	trans-(±)-2,3,4,4a,5,7,9,9a-octahydro-1-propyl-1H-pyrrolo[3,4-g]quinoline	?
	UCD0829	N,N-dimethyl-4,5,6,7-tetrahydro-2H-isoindol-5-amine	?
	N-DEAOP-PEA (PEA-NDEPA)	N-diethylaminocarbonylethylphenethylamine	?
	N-DEAOP-NMPEA (PEA-NM-NDEPA; 1-deaza-2,3,4,9-tetranor-LSD)	N-diethylaminocarbonylethyl-N-methylphenethylamine	
	3,4-DMPEA-NDEPA	N-diethylaminocarbonylethyl-3,4-dimethoxyphenethylamine	?
	M-NDEPA (mescaline-NDEPA)	N-diethylaminocarbonylethyl-3,4,5-trimethoxyamphetamine	?
	DOM-NDEPA	N-diethylaminocarbonylethyl-2,5-dimethoxy-4-methylamphetamine	?
	DOB-NDEPA	N-diethylaminocarbonylethyl-2,5-dimethoxy-4-bromoamphetamine	260810-30-8
	DOI-NDEPA	N-diethylaminocarbonylethyl-2,5-dimethoxy-4-iodoamphetamine	260810-31-9
	DOTFM-NDEPA	N-diethylaminocarbonylethyl-2,5-dimethoxy-4-trifluoromethylamphetamine	260810-29-5
	TMA-2-NDEPA	N-diethylaminocarbonylethyl-2,4,5-trimethoxyphenethylamine	
	25D-NM-NDEAOP (25D-NM-NDEPA)	N-methyl-N-(3-diethylamino-3-oxopropyl)-2,5-dimethoxy-4-methylphenethylamine	
	2-Aminotetralin (2-AT)	1,2,3,4-tetrahydronaphthalen-2-amine	2954-50-9
	UCD0830	N,N-dimethyl-2-aminotetralin	6945-44-4
	CHF-1024	5,6-dihydroxy-N-methyl-2-aminotetralin	39478-89-2
	Nolomirole (CHF-1035)	5,6-diisobutyryloxy-N-methyl-2-aminotetralin	90060-42-7
	5-OH-DPAT	5-hydroxy-N,N-dipropyl-2-aminotetralin	68593-96-4
	7-OH-DPAT	7-hydroxy-N,N-dipropyl-2-aminotetralin	74938-11-7
	8-OH-DPAT	8-hydroxy-N,N-dipropyl-2-aminotetralin	78950-78-4
	UH-301	(S)-5-fluoro-8-hydroxy-N,N-dipropyl-2-aminotetralin	127126-22-1
	UH-232	(1S,2R)-5-methoxy-1-methyl-N,N-propyl-2-aminotetralin	95999-12-5
	U-92016A	(8R)-8-(dipropylamino)-6,7,8,9-tetrahydro-3H-benzo[e]indole-2-carbonitrile	136924-88-4
	Rotigotine	6-[propyl(2-thiophen-2-ylethyl)amino]-5,6,7,8-tetrahydronaphthalen-1-ol	99755-59-6
	THPC (UCD0162)	N,N-diethyl-1-methyl-3,6-dihydro-2H-pyridine-5-carboxamide	26070-52-0
	Nikethamide	N,N-diethyl-3-pyridinecarboxamide	59-26-7

=== Structural comparisons ===
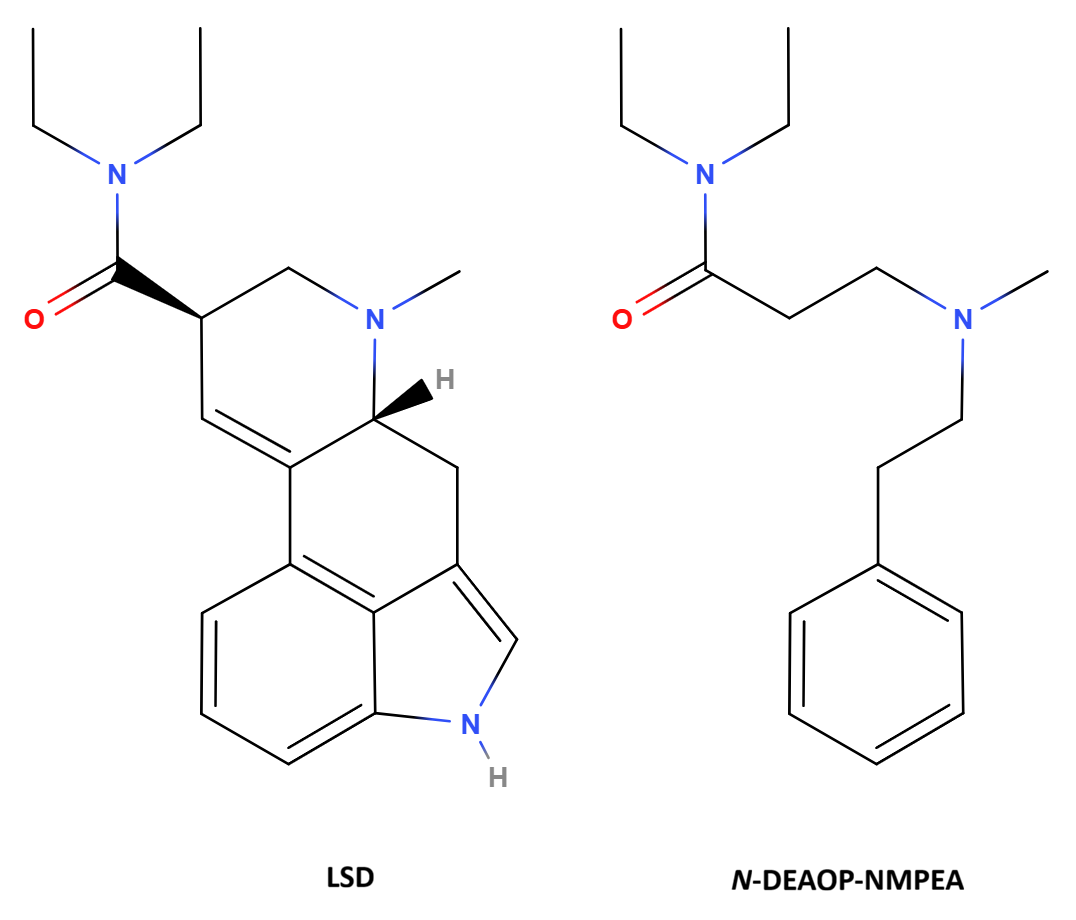
LSD (left) and N-DEAOP-NMPEA (right) structures.

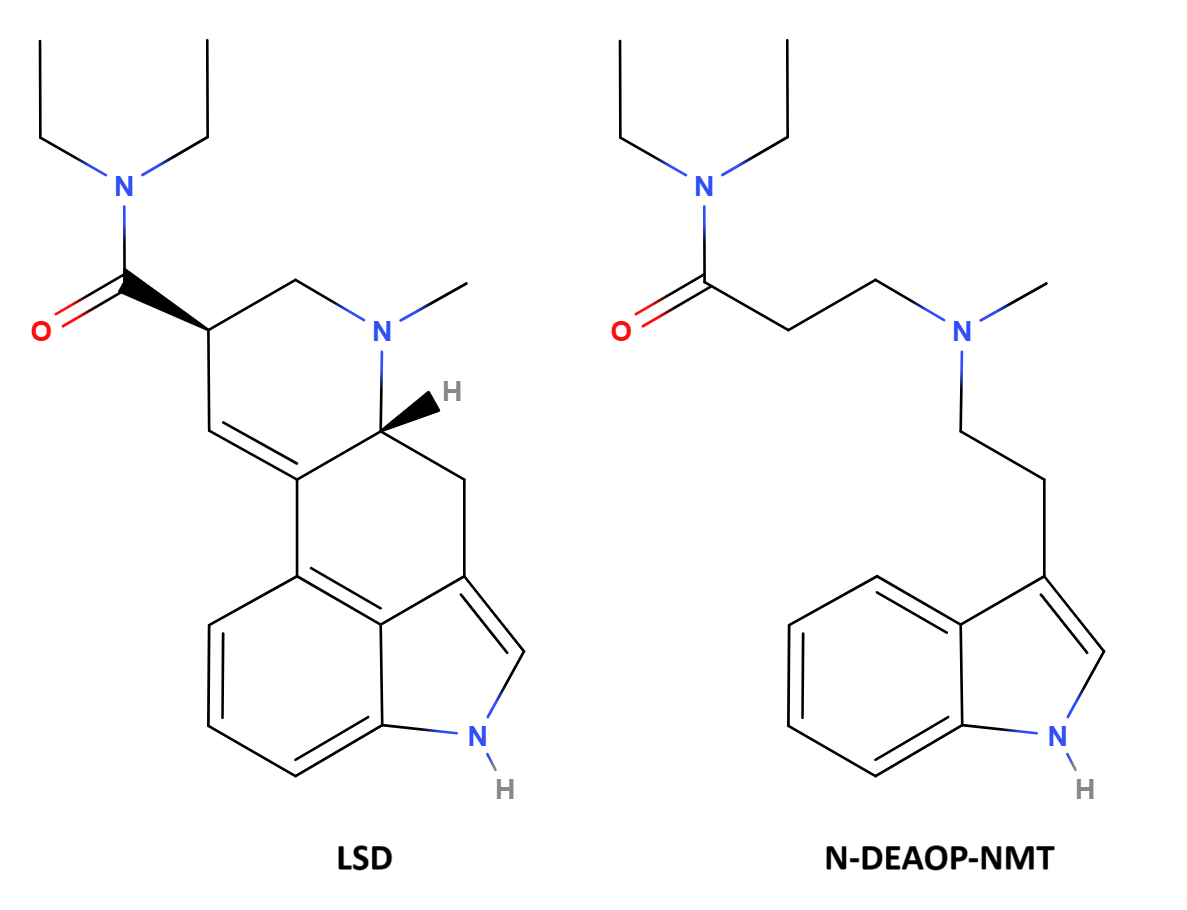
LSD (left) and N-DEAOP-NMT (right) structures.

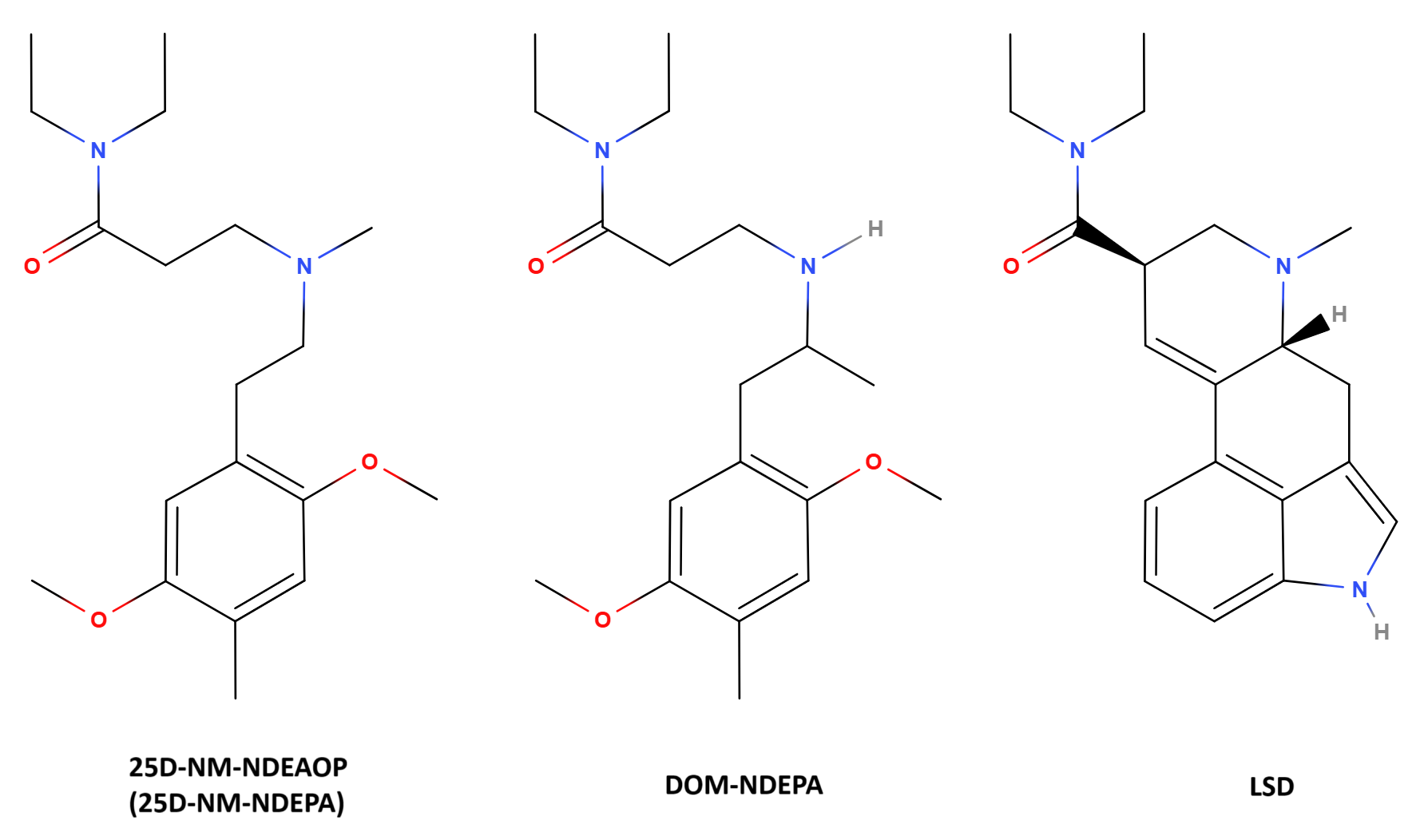
25D-NM-NDEAOP (left), DOM-NDEPA (middle), and LSD (right) structures.

UCD0120 (left) and LSD (right) structures.

LSD (left) and UCD0179 (right) structures.

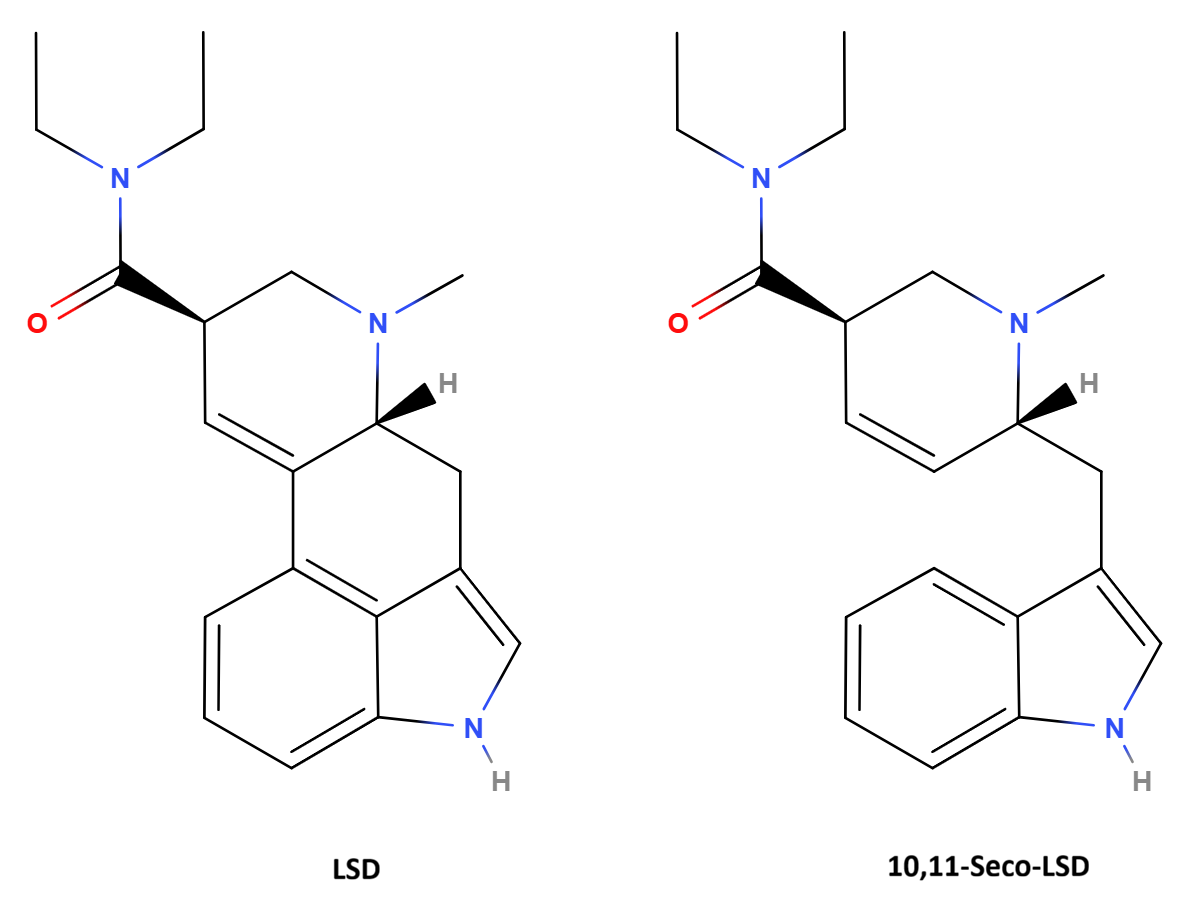
LSD (left) and 10,11-seco-LSD (right) structures.

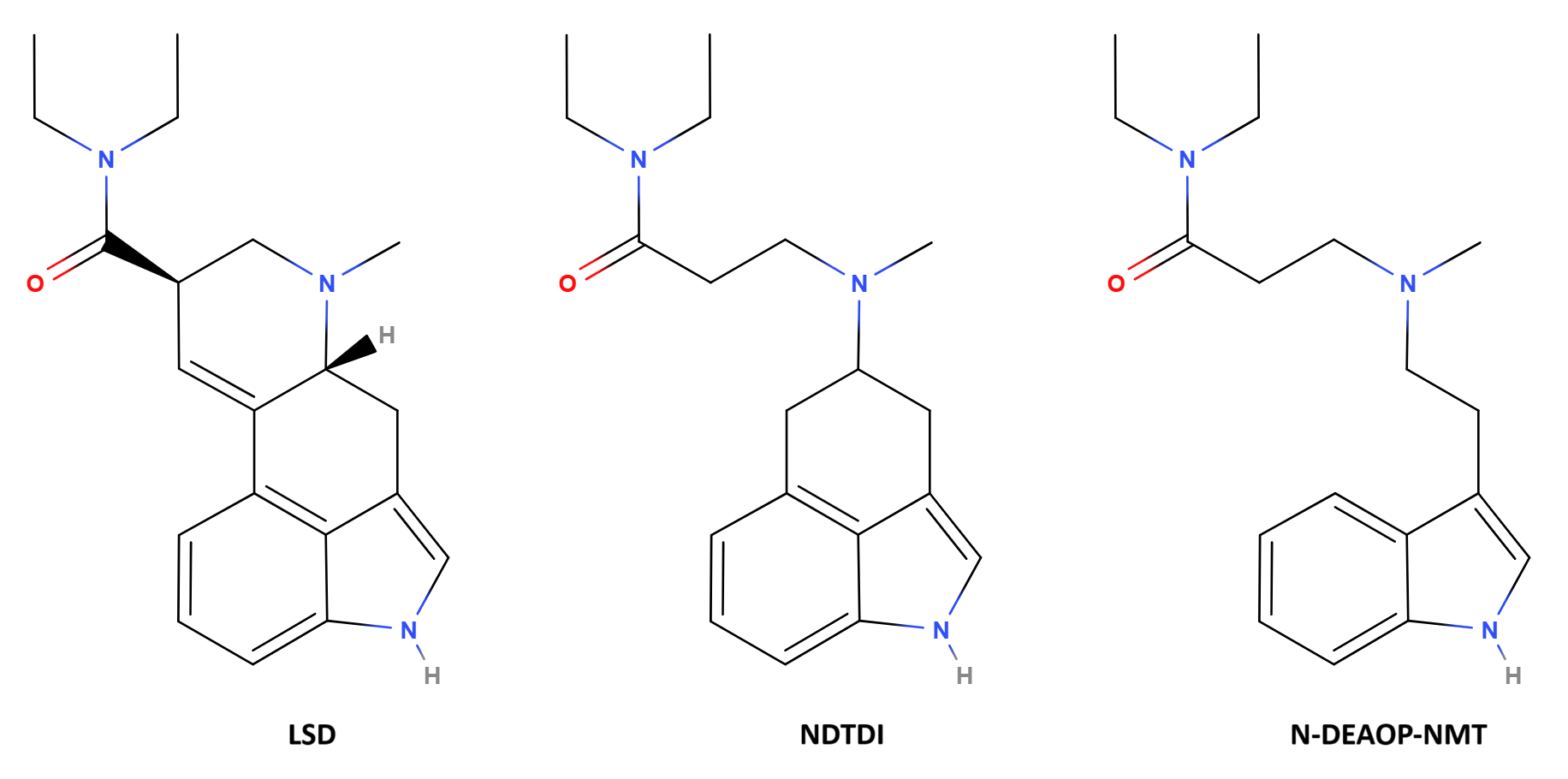
LSD (left), NDTDI (middle), and N-DEAOP-NMT (right) structures.

== Related compounds ==
Structure	Name	Chemical name	CAS #
	Chanoclavine (chanoclavine-I)	[9(9a)E]-9-methyl-9,9a-didehydro-7,8-seco-9a-homoergolin-8-ol	2390-99-0
	Chanoclavine II	(2E)-2-methyl-3-[(4R,5S)-4-(methylamino)-1,3,4,5-tetrahydrobenzo[cd]indol-5-yl]prop-2-en-1-ol	1466-08-6
	Paliclavine	(9R)-6,8-dimethyl-7,8-didehydro-6,7-secoergolin-9-ol	52052-66-1
	DLX-0002700 (see DLX-2270)	6-fluoro-N,5-dimethyl-1-azatricyclo[6.3.1.0^{4,12}]dodeca-2,4(12),5,7-tetraen-10-amine	?
	Compound 21	(10S)-3-bromo-N,N-dimethyl-1-azatricyclo[6.3.1.0^{4,12}]dodeca-2,4,6,8(12)-tetraen-10-amine	3091662-68-6
	2C-B-5-hemiFLY-α6 (BNAP)	8-bromo-6-methoxy-2a,3,4,5-tetrahydro-2H-naphtho[1,8-bc]furan-4-amine	?
	Mefloquine	(S)-[2,8-bis(trifluoromethyl)quinolin-4-yl]-[(2R)-piperidin-2-yl]methanol	51742-87-1
	DOB-5-hemiFLY (bromo-semi-fly; B-SF; 5-MeO-7-Br-4-APDB)	1-(7-bromo-5-methoxy-2,3-dihydro-1-benzofuran-4-yl)propan-2-amine	178557-10-3
	2C-B-morpholine	2-(4-bromo-2,5-dimethoxyphenyl)morpholine	807631-07-8
	Naxagolide	(4aR,10bR)-4-propyl-2,3,4a,5,6,10b-hexahydrobenzo[h][1,4]benzoxazin-9-ol	88058-88-2
	S32504	(4aR,10bR)-4-propyl-2,3,4a,5,6,10b-hexahydrobenzo[h][1,4]benzoxazine-9-carboxamide	?
	Pardoprunox	7-(4-methylpiperazin-1-yl)-3H-1,3-benzoxazol-2-one	269718-84-5
	Bifeprunox	7-[4-(biphenyl-3-ylmethyl)piperazin-1-yl]-1,3-benzoxazol-2(3H)-one	350992-10-8
	Quinpirole	(4aR,8aR)-5-propyl-1,4,4a,6,7,8,8a,9-octahydropyrazolo[5,4-g]quinoline	80373-22-4
	Quinelorane	(5aR,9aR)-6-propyl-5a,7,8,9,9a,10-hexahydro-5H-pyrido[2,3-g]quinazolin-2-amine	97466-90-5
	Quinagolide	N,N-diethyl-N-[(3S,4aS,10aR)-6-hydroxy-1-propyl-1,2,3,4,4a,5,10,10a-octahydrobenzo[g]quinolin-3-yl]sulfamide	87056-78-8
	25B-NAcPip	N-(piperidin-1-ylcarbonylmethyl)-4-bromo-2,5-dimethoxyphenethylamine	
	25B-NBOMe	N-(2-methoxybenzyl)-4-bromo-2,5-dimethoxyphenethylamine	1026511-90-9
	"Compound 37"	N-(2-diethylamino-2-oxoethyl)-N-methyl-2-amino-1,2,3,4,4a,8a-hexahydronaphthalene	
	Tochergamine	N,N-diethyl-2-(1,2,3,4-tetrahydronaphthalen-1-ylamino)acetamide	

== See also ==
- Nor-LSD (disambiguation)
- Seco-LSD
- Secoergoline
- Des-LSD
- Substituted lysergamide
- Substituted tryptamine
- Substituted phenethylamine
