= Seco-LSD =

Ergoline ring system numbered and labeled.

LSD chemical structure.

Seco-LSD is an analogue of LSD with one or more bonds removed and may refer to:

- 3,5-Seco-LSD (UCD0120 or dides-B,C-LSD)
- 8,10-Seco-LSD (NDTDI)
- 10,11-Seco-LSD (UCD0121)

Additional seco-LSD compounds with more bonds (and atoms) removed include UCD0120 (dides-B,C-LSD), N-DEAOP-NMT, and N-DEAOP-NMPEA.

== See also ==
- Secoergoline
- Nor-LSD (disambiguation)
- Des-LSD
- Partial ergoline
- Secosteroid
