= UH-232 =

Chemical compound

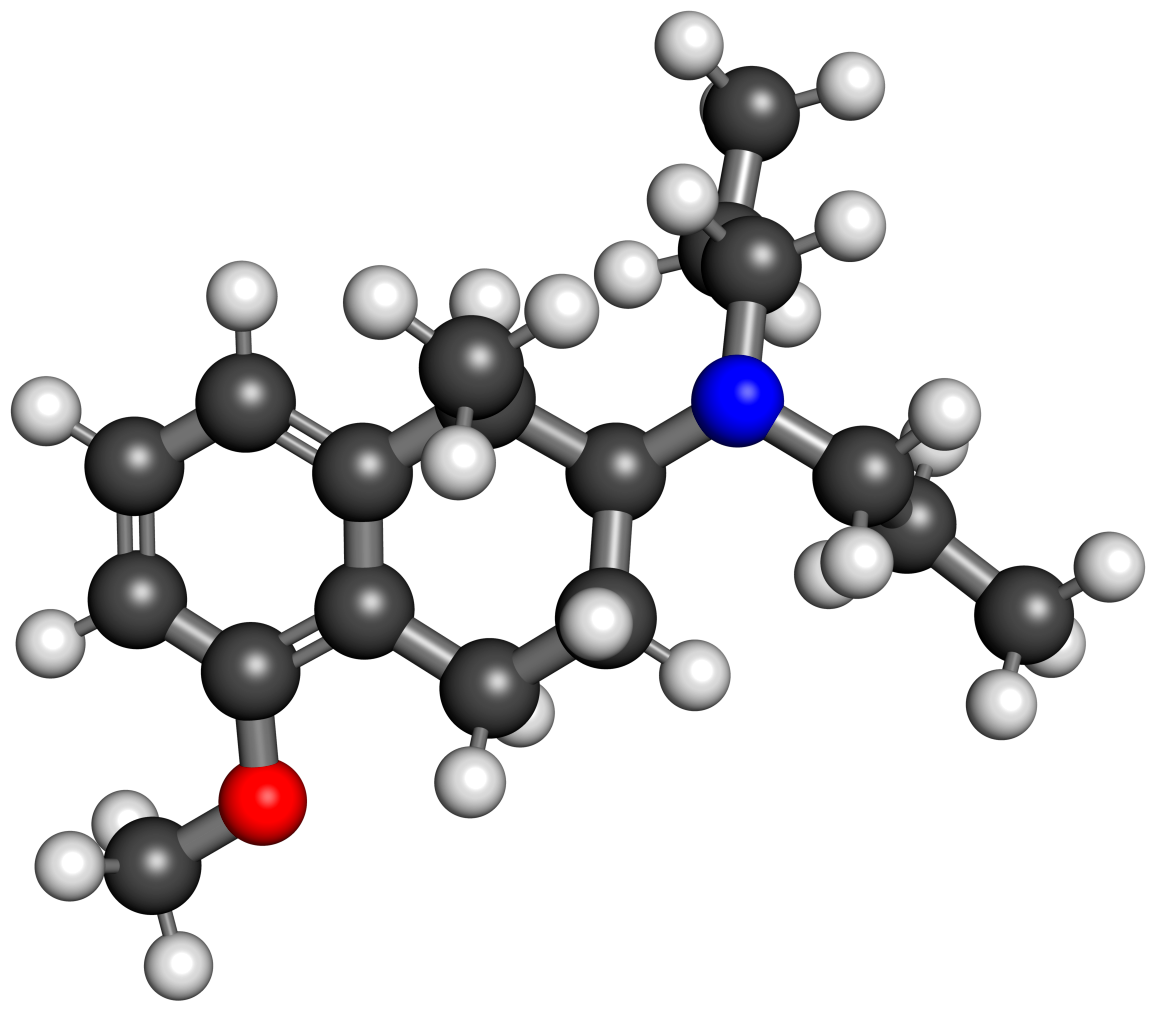

Clinical data
- Other names: UH232; (+)-UH-232; (+)-UH232; (+)-cis-5-Methoxy-1-methyl-2-(dipropylamino)tetralin; 5-HMDPTME; 5-Hydroxy-1-methyl-2-(dipropylamino)tetralin methyl ether
- Routes of administration: Oral
- Drug class: Dopamine D_{2} receptor antagonist; Dopamine D_{3} receptor weak partial agonist; Serotonin 5-HT_{2A} receptor agonist; Hallucinogen; Serotonergic psychedelic
- ATC code: None

Pharmacokinetic data
- Bioavailability: 3.7% (rats)
- Metabolites: AJ-76
- Elimination half-life: 2.5 hours (rats)

Identifiers
- IUPAC name: (1S,2R)-5-methoxy-1-methyl-N,N-dipropyl-1,2,3,4-tetrahydronaphthalen-2-amine
- CAS Number: 95999-12-5
- PubChem CID: 6604756
- ChemSpider: 5037017
- UNII: QQYOR9S587
- ChEBI: CHEBI:114198
- ChEMBL: ChEMBL278751
- CompTox Dashboard (EPA): DTXSID70875101

Chemical and physical data
- Formula: C_{18}H_{29}NO
- Molar mass: 275.436 g·mol^{−1}
- 3D model (JSmol): Interactive image
- SMILES: CCCN(CCC)[C@@H]1CCC2=C([C@@H]1C)C=CC=C2OC
- InChI: InChI=1S/C18H29NO/c1-5-12-19(13-6-2)17-11-10-16-15(14(17)3)8-7-9-18(16)20-4/h7-9,14,17H,5-6,10-13H2,1-4H3/t14-,17+/m0/s1; Key:BTOJYCTUJJHANF-WMLDXEAASA-N

UH-232, or (+)-UH-232, also known as 5-hydroxy-1-methyl-2-(dipropylamino)tetralin methyl ether (5-HMDPTME), is a dopamine and serotonin receptor modulator of the 2-aminotetralin family which was under development for the treatment of schizophrenia but was never marketed. It is taken orally. Contrary to expectations, the drug did not end up producing antipsychotic effects in clinical trials. Instead, it was reported to produce stimulant, hallucinogenic, and psychosis-exacerbating effects.

== Use and effects ==
UH-232 has been reported to produce stimulant, hallucinogenic, and psychosis-exacerbating effects in humans. The hallucinogenic effects of UH-232 have been reported to include "perceptual disturbances", "illusions", "aberrations of perception of auditory, visual and tactile stimuli", and "visual hallucinations". Based on preclinical findings, it has been theorized that the hallucinogenic effects of UH-232 may be due to serotonin 5-HT_{2A} receptor agonism and hence that it may be a serotonergic psychedelic.

== Pharmacology ==
=== Pharmacodynamics ===
UH-232 is a dopamine D_{2} and D_{3} receptor antagonist or weak partial agonist. It shows about 3- or 4-fold selectivity or higher affinity for the dopamine D_{3} receptor over the dopamine D_{2} receptor (K_{i} = 4.2–11 nM and 15–40 nM, respectively). The drug is an antagonist at dopamine D_{2}Sh autoreceptors on dopaminergic nerve terminals. It also interacts with the dopamine D_{4} receptor to a much lesser extent (K_{i} = 48–100 nM). The drug's activational efficacy is 16% at the dopamine D_{2} receptor, 16 to 40% at the dopamine D_{3} receptor, and 15% at the dopamine D_{4} receptor. However, it showed more than 1,000-fold lower activational potency at the dopamine D_{4} receptor than at the dopamine D_{2} and D_{3} receptors. It is said to be unknown whether UH-232 is a functional antagonist or partial agonist of the dopamine receptors in humans.

In addition to the dopamine D_{2} and D_{3} receptors, UH-232 shows affinity for the dopamine D_{1} receptor (K_{i} = 159 nM), serotonin 5-HT_{2} receptor (K_{i} = 118 nM), and 5-HT_{1A} receptor (K_{i} = 144–168 nM). Its affinity for the serotonin 5-HT_{2} receptor is around 10-fold lower than for the dopamine D_{2} and D_{3} receptors. The drug has been reported to increase serotonin 5-HT_{2} receptor-mediated phosphoinositol turnover in fibroblasts transfected with the rat serotonin 5-HT_{2A} receptor, suggesting that it may act as a serotonin 5-HT_{2A} receptor agonist. Accordingly, UH-232 produced hallucinogenic effects in humans.

UH-232 produces hyperlocomotion (a stimulant-like effect) at low doses and mild hypolocomotion at high doses. It also produces weak stereotypies. The stimulant-like effects of UH-232 have been thought to be due to preferential dopamine autoreceptor antagonism and consequent disinhibition of dopamine release. However, they might also be related to postsynaptic D_{3} receptor antagonism. Another possibility is that serotonin 5-HT_{2A} receptor activation may be involved in its stimulant-like effects. UH-232 produces synergistic and marked hyperlocomotion in combination with a subthreshold dose of the NMDA receptor antagonist dizocilpine (MK-801) in monoamine-depleted rodents, an effect that can be antagonized by dopamine D_{1} and D_{2} receptor antagonists and by the serotonin 5-HT_{2} receptor antagonist ritanserin.

UH-232 stimulates prolactin secretion in rodents. It has been found to antagonize the hyperlocomotion or stimulant-like effects of cocaine, dextroamphetamine, and apomorphine in rodents. The drug also antagonized their reinforcing effects in rodents. However, it did not antagonize the interoceptive effects of cocaine in rodent drug discrimination tests. In addition, it was able to partly substitute for cocaine in these tests.

=== Pharmacokinetics ===
The oral bioavailability of UH-232 is 3.7% and elimination half-life is 2.5 hours in rats.

== Chemistry ==
In terms of chemical structure, UH-232 is a substituted 2-aminotetralin, cyclized phenethylamine, and partial ergoline.

=== Synthesis ===
The chemical synthesis of UH-232 has been described.

=== Analogues ===
AJ-76, or (+)-AJ-76.

The N-monopropyl derivative (+)-AJ-76 is an active metabolite of UH-232 and has practically identical effects. Another analogue of UH-232 is UH-242 (5-HMDPT; 5-OH-MDAT). Other analogues of UH-232 include 5-OH-DPAT, 7-OH-DPAT, 8-OH-DPAT, DOM-AT, PNU-99,194, RDS-127, rotigotine, and UH-301, among others. In addition, UH-232 is structurally similar to the cyclized tryptamine and partial ergoline RU-28251 (4,α-methylene-DPT).

Structural comparison of UH-232 and other partial ergolines
UH-232

RU-28251

NDTDI

LSD

== History ==
UH-232 was first described in the scientific literature by Arvid Carlsson and colleagues by 1986. It was developed by AstraZeneca. A clinical study of UH-232 for treatment of schizophrenia was published in 1998. It was also evaluated in healthy volunteers, in whom it unexpectedly produced hallucinogenic effects.

== Research ==
UH-232 was under development for the treatment of schizophrenia. It reached phase 1 clinical trials for this indication before development was discontinued. The drug did not improve symptoms of schizophrenia in a small trial. Instead, it appeared to exacerbate symptoms, including increasing unusual thought content, anxiety, activation, and hostility. Besides treatment of schizophrenia, UH-232 has been proposed for potential use in the diagnosis of early-stage Parkinson's disease.

== See also ==
- Substituted 2-aminotetralin
- Cyclized phenethylamine
- Partial ergoline
- List of investigational antipsychotics
- List of miscellaneous 5-HT_{2A} receptor agonists
- Robalzotan
