= C19H26N2O =

The molecular formula C_{19}H_{26}N_{2}O (molar mass: 298.205 g/mol, exact mass: 298.2045 u) may refer to:

- 8-Carboxamidocyclazocine (8-CAC)
- LY-293284
- UCD0068
