= RU-27849 =

Clinical data
- Other names: RU27849; 4,α-Methylenetryptamine; 4,α-Methylene-T; 4-Amino-1,3,4,5-tetrahydrobenz[c,d]indole
- Drug class: Serotonin receptor modulator; Simplified/partial LSD analogue
- ATC code: None

Identifiers
- IUPAC name: 1,3,4,5-tetrahydrobenzo[c,d]indol-4-amine
- CAS Number: 77963-70-3
- PubChem CID: 132797
- ChemSpider: 117204
- CompTox Dashboard (EPA): DTXSID20999149

Chemical and physical data
- Formula: C_{11}H_{12}N_{2}
- Molar mass: 172.231 g·mol^{−1}
- 3D model (JSmol): Interactive image
- SMILES: C1C(CC2=CNC3=CC=CC1=C23)N
- InChI: InChI=1S/C11H12N2/c12-9-4-7-2-1-3-10-11(7)8(5-9)6-13-10/h1-3,6,9,13H,4-5,12H2; Key:JPTWSZJFCLJZJX-UHFFFAOYSA-N

RU-27849, also known as 4,α-methylenetryptamine (4,α-methylene-T), is a serotonin receptor modulator. It can be regarded as a conformationally restricted tricyclic derivative of tryptamine or a structurally simplified derivative of LSD. This molecule was developed during structure–activity relationship (SAR) studies of LSD.

It shows affinity for serotonin receptors, including for the serotonin 5-HT_{1}, 5-HT_{1A}, and 5-HT_{2} receptors (IC_{50} = 267–520 nM, 325–326 nM, and 1,964–2,900 nM, respectively). RU-27849's affinities for serotonin receptors are similar to but lower than those of tryptamine and dimethyltryptamine (DMT). It shows very weak affinity for dopamine receptors and weak associated activity.

The 6-methoxy derivative of RU-27849, which is to RU-27849 as 5-methoxytryptamine is to tryptamine, appears to have much higher affinity for serotonin receptors than RU-27849 itself (IC_{50} ≈ 50 nM). A number of other derivatives also exist, including FHATHBIN (6-hydroxy), RU-28306 (N,N-dimethyl), RU-28251 (N,N-dipropyl), Bay R 1531 (LY-197206; 6-methoxy-N,N-dipropyl), LY-293284 ((4R)-6-acetyl-N,N-dipropyl), and LY-178210 (6-carboxamido-N,N-dipropyl), as well as NDTDI, among others.

RU-27849 was first described in the scientific literature by 1981.

== See also ==
- Partial lysergamide
- N-DEAOP-NMT
- CT-5252
- Paliclavine
- 2C-B-5-hemiFLY-α6
- 4-(2-Aminopropyl)indole (4-API)
- 3-AMTBI
