= RU-28251 =

Clinical data
- Other names: RU28251; 4,α-Methylene-N,N-dipropyltryptamine; 4,α-Methylene-DPT
- Drug class: Dopamine receptor agonist; D_{2}-like receptor agonist; Serotonin receptor modulator; Prolactin inhibitor
- ATC code: None

Identifiers
- IUPAC name: N,N-dipropyl-1,3,4,5-tetrahydrobenzo[cd]indol-4-amine
- PubChem CID: 12928517
- ChemSpider: 10772584
- ChEMBL: ChEMBL49027

Chemical and physical data
- Formula: C_{17}H_{24}N_{2}
- Molar mass: 256.393 g·mol^{−1}
- 3D model (JSmol): Interactive image
- SMILES: CCCN(CCC)C1CC2=C3C(=CNC3=CC=C2)C1
- InChI: InChI=1S/C17H24N2/c1-3-8-19(9-4-2)15-10-13-6-5-7-16-17(13)14(11-15)12-18-16/h5-7,12,15,18H,3-4,8-11H2,1-2H3; Key:YBHBWJNGSCDSMJ-UHFFFAOYSA-N

RU-28251, also known as 4,α-methylene-N,N-dipropyltryptamine (4,α-methylene-DPT), is a tricyclic cyclized tryptamine and simplified or partial ergoline. It is a dopamine D_{2}-like receptor agonist and shows affinity for the serotonin 5-HT_{1} and 5-HT_{2} receptors (IC_{50} = 141 nM and 723 nM, respectively). The drug inhibits prolactin secretion in animals. The chemical synthesis of RU-28251 has been described. RU-28251 was first described in the scientific literature by 1978.

== See also ==
- Partial ergoline
- Bay R 1531 (LY-197206)
- LY-293284
- LY-178210
- RU-27849
- RU-28306
