= 3-AMTBI =

Clinical data
- Other names: 3-Aminomethyl-THBI; 3-Aminomethyl-1,3,4,5-tetrahydrobenz(cd)indole; 4,β-Dimethylenetryptamine
- Drug class: Serotonin receptor modulator
- ATC code: None

Identifiers
- IUPAC name: 1,3,4,5-tetrahydrobenzo[cd]indol-3-ylmethanamine
- CAS Number: 111261-72-4
- PubChem CID: 194894
- ChemSpider: 169073
- CompTox Dashboard (EPA): DTXSID30912086

Chemical and physical data
- Formula: C_{12}H_{14}N_{2}
- Molar mass: 186.258 g·mol^{−1}
- 3D model (JSmol): Interactive image
- SMILES: C1CC2=C3C(=CC=C2)NC=C3C1CN
- InChI: InChI=1S/C12H14N2/c13-6-9-5-4-8-2-1-3-11-12(8)10(9)7-14-11/h1-3,7,9,14H,4-6,13H2; Key:PKWJZQKTYSEOEQ-UHFFFAOYSA-N

3-AMTBI, also known as 3-aminomethyl-THBI, 3-aminomethyl-1,3,4,5-tetrahydrobenz(cd)indole, or 4,β-dimethylenetryptamine, is a serotonin receptor modulator of the tryptamine family. It is a cyclized tryptamine and is the derivative of tryptamine in which the 4 and β positions have been connected with an ethyl group, resulting in a non-partial-ergoline tricyclic compound. The drug shows affinity for the serotonin 5-HT_{1}, 5-HT_{1A}, and 5-HT_{2A} receptors (K_{i} = 392 nM, 369 nM, and 465–555 nM, respectively). It showed several-fold higher affinity for the serotonin 5-HT_{2A} receptor than tryptamine and about the same affinity as dimethyltryptamine (DMT). The chemical synthesis of 3-AMTBI has been described. 3-AMTBI was first described in the scientific literature by Ethan Will Taylor and colleagues by 1985.

== See also ==
- Cyclized tryptamine
- RU-27849
