= Tochergamine =

Clinical data
- Other names: 621 I.S.; N,N-Diethyl-N′-(1,2,3,4-tetrahydronaphthyl)-glycinamide; Tochergamina
- Routes of administration: Parenteral (e.g., intravenous injection, intramuscular injection)
- Drug class: Oxytocic
- ATC code: None

Identifiers
- IUPAC name: N,N-diethyl-2-(1,2,3,4-tetrahydronaphthalen-1-ylamino)acetamide
- PubChem CID: 43410827
- ChemSpider: 37924316

Chemical and physical data
- Formula: C_{16}H_{24}N_{2}O
- Molar mass: 260.381 g·mol^{−1}
- 3D model (JSmol): Interactive image
- SMILES: CCN(CC)C(=O)CNC1CCCC2=CC=CC=C12
- InChI: InChI=1S/C16H24N2O/c1-3-18(4-2)16(19)12-17-15-11-7-9-13-8-5-6-10-14(13)15/h5-6,8,10,15,17H,3-4,7,9,11-12H2,1-2H3; Key:SPTBJOUWQBBDDE-UHFFFAOYSA-N

Tochergamine, also known as 621 I.S. or as N,N-diethyl-N′-(1,2,3,4-tetrahydronaphthyl)glycinamide, is an oxytocic drug related to ergometrine which does not appear to have been marketed.

It was reported to be effective as an oxytocic agent in animal studies, with oxytocic activity equivalent to that of ergometrine. In addition, the drug was reported to be effective in clinical studies at doses of 2 to 6 mg parenterally. However, subsequent research found that it was inactive on the intact human uterus at doses of up to 20 mg, and further investigation of tochergamine was abandoned.

Tochergamine has a simplified lysergamide-like chemical structure, with a 1-aminotetralin ring system, and is structurally related to lysergamides like ergometrine and LSD. However, it is not technically a partial ergoline or lysergamide, only partial ergoline-like, as its structural features differ in certain regards from those of ergolines and lysergamides. The oxytocic effects of lysergamides like ergometrine are thought to most likely be mediated by agonism of serotonin 5-HT_{2} receptors in uterine smooth muscle tissue.

Tochergamine was first described in the scientific literature in 1951. It was developed by Daniel Bovet and colleagues at the Istituto Superiore di Sanità in Rome, Italy. The drug was known as tochergamina in Italy. It was clinically studied as an oxytocic agent in the 1950s.

Analogues of tochergamine, for instance the 2-aminotetralin positional isomer, have also been described, and have likewise shown oxytocic and lysergic acid-like activity.

== See also ==
- Partial ergoline
- Nikethamide
