= C19H25NO =

The molecular formula C_{19}H_{25}NO (molar mass: 283.41 g/mol) may refer to:

- 4-EA-NBOMe
- Alentemol
- Dextrallorphan (DXA)
- Hexapradol
- Histrionicotoxin
- Levallorphan
- RU-24213
- Tesmilifene, also known as N,N-diethyl-2-(4-phenylmethyl)ethanamine (DPPE)
