= NDTDI =

Chemical compound

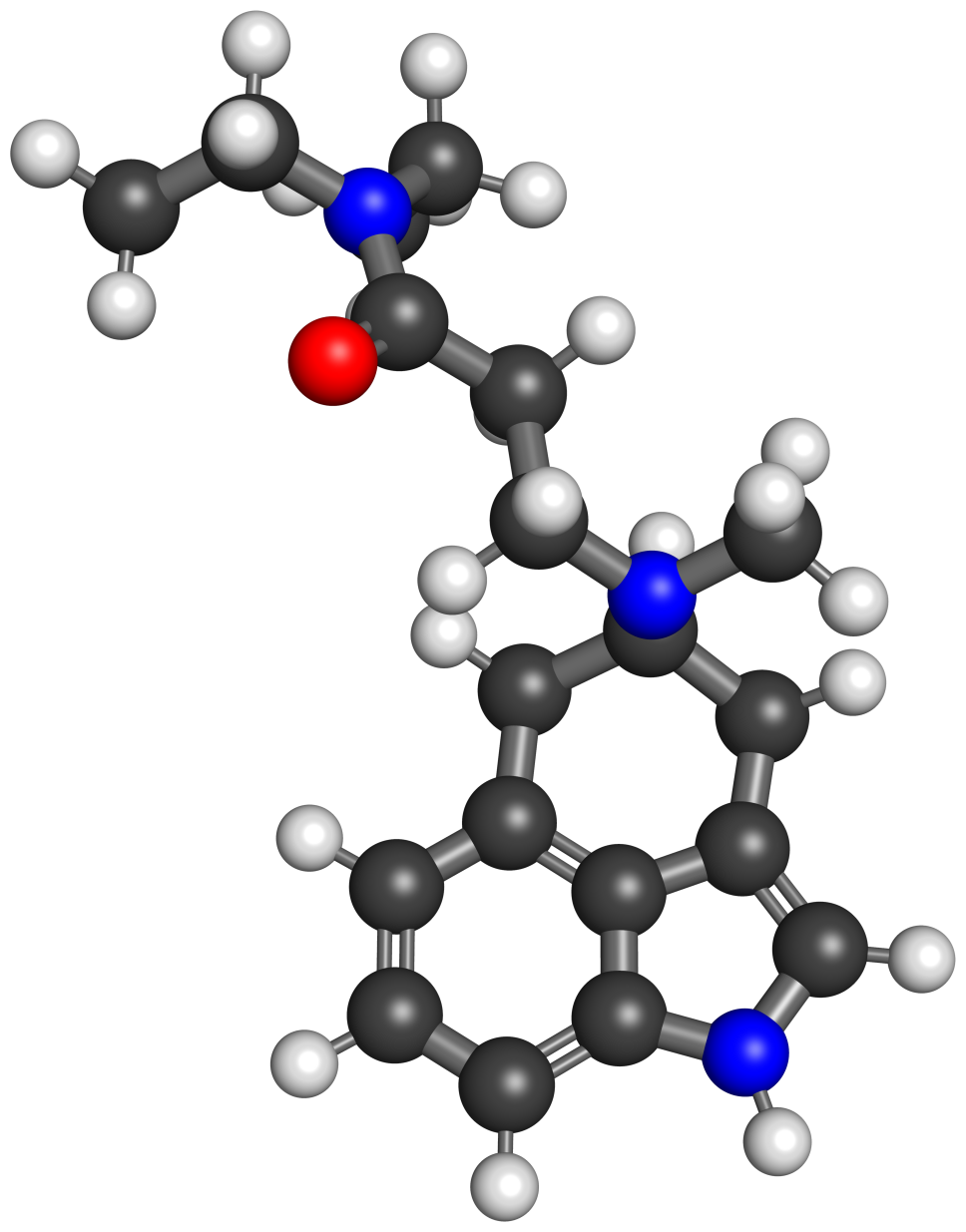

Clinical data
- Other names: N-(2-Diethylcarbamoylethyl)-N-methyl-4,α-methylenetryptamine; N-(3-Diethylamino-3-oxopropyl)-N-methyl-4,α-methylenetryptamine; 9-Nor-LSD; 9-Desmethine-LSD; 8,10-Seco-LSD
- Drug class: Serotonergic psychedelic; Hallucinogen; Simplified/partial LSD analogue
- ATC code: None

Legal status
- Legal status: Illegal in Latvia

Identifiers
- IUPAC name: N,N-diethyl-3-(methyl(1,3,4,5-tetrahydrobenzo[cd]indol-4-yl)amino)propanamide
- PubChem CID: 163192742
- CompTox Dashboard (EPA): DTXSID601342245

Chemical and physical data
- Formula: C_{19}H_{27}N_{3}O
- Molar mass: 313.445 g·mol^{−1}
- 3D model (JSmol): Interactive image
- SMILES: CCN(CC)C(=O)CCN(C)C1Cc3cccc2ncc(C1)c23
- InChI: InChI=1S/C19H27N3O/c1-4-22(5-2)18(23)9-10-21(3)16-11-14-7-6-8-17-19(14)15(12-16)13-20-17/h6-8,13,16,20H,4-5,9-12H2,1-3H3; Key:JECGWOMOCPQHDH-UHFFFAOYSA-N

NDTDI, also known as 9-desmethine-LSD, 9-nor-LSD, or 8,10-seco-LSD, is a psychedelic drug related to lysergic acid diethylamide (LSD). It is a tricyclic cyclized tryptamine and partial lysergamide and is a structurally simplified analogue of LSD. The drug is specifically the analogue of LSD in which the carbon atom at position 9 of the ergoline ring system has been removed. It has been reported to produce psychedelic effects similarly to LSD, but with much lower potency. The pharmacology of NDTDI has not been studied. NDTDI was encountered as a novel designer drug by 2016.

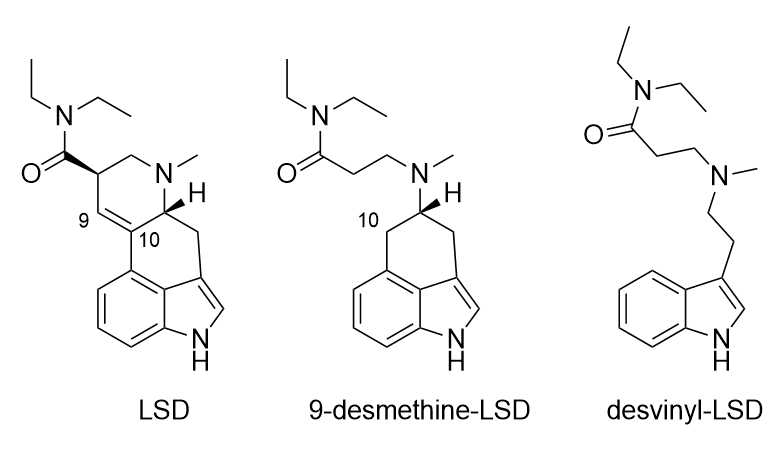
Structures of LSD (left), NDTDI (4-desmethine-LSD) (middle), and N-DEAOP-NMT (desvinyl-LSD) (right).

== Chemistry ==
=== Analogues ===
Analogues of NDTDI include RU-27849, RU-28306, RU-28251, Bay R 1531 (LY-197206), LY-293284, and LY-178210. Other partial/simplified lysergamides include UCD0179 (4-nor-LSD), UCD0120 (dides-B,C-LSD), and 10,11-seco-LSD, among others. Deletion of the carbon at positions 9 and 10 of the ergoline ring system result in a fully non-rigid tryptamine derivative, N-DEAOP-NMT (9,10-dinor-LSD).

== History ==
NDTDI has been sold as a designer drug since 2016 and was first identified by a forensic laboratory in Slovenia in 2017. NDTDI was made illegal in Latvia in March 2017.

== Society and culture ==
=== Legal status ===
==== Canada ====
NDTDI is not an explicitly nor implicitly controlled substance in Canada as of 2025.

==== United States ====
NDTDI is not an explicitly controlled substance in the United States. However, it could be considered a controlled substance under the Federal Analogue Act if intended for human consumption.

== See also ==
- Partial lysergamide
- List of miscellaneous 5-HT_{2A} receptor agonists
- Seco-LSD
