= Alentemol =

Selective dopamine autoreceptor agonist

Names
- IUPAC name 2-(Dipropylamino)-2,3-dihydro-1H-phenalen-5-ol

Identifiers
CAS Number	112891-97-1
3D model (JSmol)	Interactive image
ChEMBL	ChEMBL2104081
ChemSpider	54603
PubChem CID	60574
UNII	F6S91MHL3E
CompTox Dashboard (EPA)	DTXSID80869556
- InChI: InChI=1S/C19H25NO/c1-3-8-20(9-4-2)17-10-14-6-5-7-15-12-18(21)13-16(11-17)19(14)15/h5-7,12-13,17,21H,3-4,8-11H2,1-2H3 Key: TWUJBHBRYYTEDL-UHFFFAOYSA-N; InChI=1/C19H25NO/c1-3-8-20(9-4-2)17-10-14-6-5-7-15-12-18(21)13-16(11-17)19(14)15/h5-7,12-13,17,21H,3-4,8-11H2,1-2H3 Key: TWUJBHBRYYTEDL-UHFFFAOYAC
- SMILES: CCCN(CCC)C1CC2=CC=CC3=CC(=CC(=C23)C1)O

Properties
Chemical formula	C_{19}H_{25}NO
Molar mass	283.415 g·mol^{−1}
- Except where otherwise noted, data are given for materials in their standard state (at 25 °C [77 °F], 100 kPa). Infobox references

Alentemol (INN) (developmental code name U-66444B), or alentamol, is a selective dopamine autoreceptor agonist described as an antipsychotic, which was never marketed.

== See also ==
- Lysergamides § Simplified or partial lysergamides
- LY-178210
- Bay R 1531 (LY-197206)
- LY-293284
