= LY-293284 =

Chemical compound

Clinical data
- Other names: LY293284; 4,α-Methylene-5-acetyl-N,N-dipropyltryptamine; 4,α-Methylene-5-acetyl-DPT
- Drug class: Serotonin 5-HT_{1A} receptor agonist; Simplified/partial LSD analogue

Identifiers
- IUPAC name: (4R)-6-acetyl-4-(di-n-propylamino)-1,3,4,5-tetrahydrobenz[c,d]indole
- CAS Number: 141318-62-9
- PubChem CID: 132345
- IUPHAR/BPS: 19
- ChemSpider: 116875
- UNII: 92MME29XHM
- CompTox Dashboard (EPA): DTXSID70161692

Chemical and physical data
- Formula: C_{19}H_{26}N_{2}O
- Molar mass: 298.430 g·mol^{−1}
- 3D model (JSmol): Interactive image
- SMILES: CCCN(CCC)[C@H]1CC2=CNC3=C2C(=C(C=C3)C(=O)C)C1
- InChI: InChI=1S/C19H26N2O/c1-4-8-21(9-5-2)15-10-14-12-20-18-7-6-16(13(3)22)17(11-15)19(14)18/h6-7,12,15,20H,4-5,8-11H2,1-3H3/t15-/m0/s1; Key:CKYZLYQSDNLGPT-HNNXBMFYSA-N

LY-293284, also known as 4,α-methylene-5-acetyl-DPT, is a research chemical developed by the pharmaceutical company Eli Lilly and used for scientific studies. It acts as a potent and selective 5-HT_{1A} receptor full agonist (K_{i} = 0.088 nM; EC_{50} = 0.13 nM). It was derived through structural simplification of the ergoline based psychedelic LSD, but is far more selective for 5-HT_{1A} with over 1,000-fold selectivity over other serotonin receptor subtypes and other targets. It has anxiogenic effects in animal studies. In addition, it does not substitute for LSD in rodent drug discrimination tests.

== See also ==
- Partial lysergamide
- LY-301317
- LY-178210
- 8-OH-DPAT
- RDS-127
- RU-27849
- RU-28306
- N-DEAOP-NMT
- CT-5252
