= U-92016-A =

Psychoactive drug

Clinical data
- Other names: U-92016A; U-92016-A; U92016A; U92016-A; U-92,016-A
- Drug class: Serotonin 5-HT_{1A} receptor agonist

Identifiers
- IUPAC name: (8R)-8-(Dipropylamino)-6,7,8,9-tetrahydro-3H-benz[e]indole-2-carbonitrile
- CAS Number: 136924-88-4; hydrochloride: 149654-41-1
- PubChem CID: 9904242
- IUPHAR/BPS: 30
- ChemSpider: 8079896
- UNII: 9JQ994EAB3; hydrochloride: DSP36A348S
- ChEBI: CHEBI:232976
- ChEMBL: ChEMBL71920
- CompTox Dashboard (EPA): DTXSID80929583 DTXSID00432645, DTXSID80929583

Chemical and physical data
- Formula: C_{19}H_{25}N_{3}
- Molar mass: 295.430 g·mol^{−1}
- 3D model (JSmol): Interactive image
- SMILES: N#Cc3cc1c(ccc2c1C[C@H](N(CCC)CCC)CC2)[nH]3
- InChI: InChI=1S/C19H25N3/c1-3-9-22(10-4-2)16-7-5-14-6-8-19-18(17(14)12-16)11-15(13-20)21-19/h6,8,11,16,21H,3-5,7,9-10,12H2,1-2H3/t16-/m1/s1; Key:WDDZPZKGLZNGEH-MRXNPFEDSA-N

U-92016A, or U92016A, is a potent, high efficacy, and selective serotonin 5-HT_{1A} receptor full agonist with a long duration of action. It has been suggested that it could be developed as an anxiolytic or antidepressant.

== See also ==
- Substituted 2-aminotetralin
- Partial ergoline
