= LY-178210 =

Clinical data
- Other names: LY178210; LY-228729; LY228729; 4,α-Methylene-5-carboxamido-N,N-dipropyltryptamine; 4,α-Methylene-5-carboxamido-DPT
- Drug class: Serotonin 5-HT_{1A} receptor partial agonist
- ATC code: None

Identifiers
- IUPAC name: 4-(dipropylamino)-1,3,4,5-tetrahydrobenzo[cd]indole-6-carboxamide
- CAS Number: 114943-19-0
- PubChem CID: 60845
- ChemSpider: 54832
- ChEMBL: ChEMBL296753
- CompTox Dashboard (EPA): DTXSID20905583

Chemical and physical data
- Formula: C_{18}H_{25}N_{3}O
- Molar mass: 299.418 g·mol^{−1}
- 3D model (JSmol): Interactive image
- SMILES: CCCN(CCC)C1CC2=CNC3=C2C(=C(C=C3)C(=O)N)C1
- InChI: InChI=1S/C18H25N3O/c1-3-7-21(8-4-2)13-9-12-11-20-16-6-5-14(18(19)22)15(10-13)17(12)16/h5-6,11,13,20H,3-4,7-10H2,1-2H3,(H2,19,22); Key:YTOJFUORFUYGSV-UHFFFAOYSA-N

LY-178210, also known as LY-228729 or as 4,α-methylene-5-carboxamido-DPT, is a selective and highly potent serotonin 5-HT_{1A} receptor partial agonist. It has an affinity (K_{i}) of 0.67 nM for the serotonin 5-HT_{1A} receptor. The drug has high selectivity for this receptor over 12 other assessed targets, including the serotonin 5-HT_{1D}, 5-HT_{2A}, 5-HT_{2C}, and 5-HT_{3} receptors among others (K_{i} = ≥380–4,000 nM). LY-178210 is a tricyclic simplified or partial ergoline and is structurally related to LSD. It was described as a potential clinical development candidate but was not further developed and was never marketed. Both LY-178210 and flesinoxan have been reported to produce anxiety in humans. The drug was first reported in the scientific literature by 1990.

== See also ==
- Partial lysergamide
- LY-301317
- RU-27849
- RU-28306
- Bay R 1531 (LY-197206)
- LY-293284
- NDTDI
- 8-OH-DPAT
- Alentemol
