= UCD0068 =

Clinical data
- Other names: UCD-0068; Des-B-LSD; "Compound 163"; "Compound VIII"
- Drug class: Serotonin receptor modulator; Serotonin 5-HT_{2A} receptor agonist; Serotonin 5-HT_{2B} receptor agonist; Simplified/partial LSD analogue
- ATC code: None

Identifiers
- IUPAC name: N,N-diethyl-4-methyl-2,3,4,4a,5,6-hexahydrobenzo(f)quinoline-2-carboxamide

Chemical and physical data
- Formula: C_{19}H_{26}N_{2}O
- Molar mass: 298.430 g·mol^{−1}
- 3D model (JSmol): Interactive image
- SMILES: O=C(N(CC)CC)C1CN(C)C(C2=C1)CCC3=C2C=CC=C3
- InChI: InChI=1S/C19H26N2O/c1-4-21(5-2)19(22)15-12-17-16-9-7-6-8-14(16)10-11-18(17)20(3)13-15/h6-9,12,15,18H,4-5,10-11,13H2,1-3H3; Key:JGQWVWVCCZKKOC-UHFFFAOYSA-N

UCD0068, also known as des-B-LSD, is a putatively non-hallucinogenic serotonin receptor modulator related to the psychedelic drug LSD. It is a simplified or partial lysergamide and is the deconstructed analogue of LSD in which the B ring (the pyrrole component of the indole ring) has been removed. The drug can also be thought of as a cyclized phenethylamine.

== Pharmacology ==
UCD0068 shows weak affinity for the serotonin 5-HT_{2A} receptor (K_{i} = 890 nM). The drug's affinity for this receptor was 166-fold lower than that of LSD. UCD0068 acts as a moderate-to-high efficacy partial agonist of the serotonin 5-HT_{2A}, 5-HT_{2B}, and 5-HT_{2C} receptors. Its EC_{50} and E_{max} values at these receptors were found to be 104 nM (60%) at the serotonin 5-HT_{2A} receptor, 9.24 nM (61%) at the serotonin 5-HT_{2B} receptor, and 176 nM (89%) at the serotonin 5-HT_{2C} receptor. The drug was 188-fold, 17-fold, and 283-fold less potent as an agonist of these receptors than LSD, respectively. Hence, it is a relatively selective serotonin 5-HT_{2B} receptor agonist.

In contrast to LSD and another partial lysergamide known as UCD0120 (dides-B,C-LSD), UCD0068 failed to induce the head-twitch response, a behavioral proxy of psychedelic effects, in rodents. As such, UCD0068 would be expected to be non-hallucinogenic in humans.

== Chemistry ==
The chemical synthesis of UCD0068 has been described. A variety of other deconstructed analogues of LSD along with UCD0068 have also been described.

== History ==
UCD0068 was first described in the scientific literature by Zenichi Horii and colleagues by 1967. Subsequently, it was studied and described in greater detail by David E. Olson and colleagues at the University of California, Davis in 2026.

== See also ==
- Partial lysergamide
