= 6-MeO-RU-28306 =

Clinical data
- Other names: 6-Methoxy-RU-28306; 6-MeO-RU28306; 6-Methoxy-RU28306; 4,α-Methylene-5-methoxy-N,N-dimethyltryptamine; 4,α-Methylene-5-MeO-DMT
- Drug class: Serotonin receptor modulator
- ATC code: None

Identifiers
- IUPAC name: 6-methoxy-N,N-dimethyl-1,3,4,5-tetrahydrobenzo[cd]indol-4-amine
- PubChem CID: 13356524
- ChemSpider: 14542283
- ChEMBL: ChEMBL49309

Chemical and physical data
- Formula: C_{14}H_{18}N_{2}O
- Molar mass: 230.311 g·mol^{−1}
- 3D model (JSmol): Interactive image
- SMILES: CN(C)C1CC2=CNC3=C2C(=C(C=C3)OC)C1
- InChI: InChI=1S/C14H18N2O/c1-16(2)10-6-9-8-15-12-4-5-13(17-3)11(7-10)14(9)12/h4-5,8,10,15H,6-7H2,1-3H3; Key:ZHSVGDFOQZTIEK-UHFFFAOYSA-N

6-MeO-RU-28306, or 6-methoxy-RU-28306, also known as 4,α-methylene-5-methoxy-N,N-dimethyltryptamine (4,α-methylene-5-MeO-DMT), is a serotonin receptor modulator and a cyclized tryptamine and partial ergoline. It is the 6-methoxy derivative of RU-28306 (4,α-methylene-DMT) and a cyclized derivative of 5-MeO-DMT. The drug showed affinity for the serotonin-labeled serotonin 5-HT_{1} receptors and spiperone-labeled serotonin 5-HT_{2} receptors in rat frontal cortex membranes in vitro (IC_{50} = 96 nM and 1,756 nM, respectively). 6-MeO-RU-28306 robustly reduced hypothalamic 5-hydroxyindoleacetic acid (5-HIAA) levels and increased circulating corticosterone levels in rodents in vivo, which are both measures of serotonin receptor agonist activity. The chemical synthesis of 6-MeO-RU-28306 has been described. 6-MeO-RU-28306 was first described in the scientific literature by 1988.

== See also ==
- Partial lysergamide
- Bay R 1531 (LY-197206)
