= LY-301317 =

Clinical data
- Other names: LY301317; (R)-4,α-Methylene-5-(1,3-oxazol-5-yl)-N,N-dipropyltryptamine; (R)-4,α-Methylene-5-(1,3-oxazol-5-yl)-DPT
- Drug class: Serotonin 5-HT_{1A} receptor agonist; Simplified/partial LSD analogue
- ATC code: None

Identifiers
- IUPAC name: (4R)-6-(1,3-oxazol-5-yl)-N,N-dipropyl-1,3,4,5-tetrahydrobenzo[cd]indol-4-amine
- PubChem CID: 9949130
- ChemSpider: 8124741

Chemical and physical data
- Formula: C_{20}H_{25}N_{3}O
- Molar mass: 323.440 g·mol^{−1}
- 3D model (JSmol): Interactive image
- SMILES: CCCN(CCC)[C@H]1CC2=CNC3=C2C(=C(C=C3)C4=CN=CO4)C1
- InChI: InChI=1S/C20H25N3O/c1-3-7-23(8-4-2)15-9-14-11-22-18-6-5-16(17(10-15)20(14)18)19-12-21-13-24-19/h5-6,11-13,15,22H,3-4,7-10H2,1-2H3/t15-/m0/s1; Key:WVWRMVCFJMZWKO-HNNXBMFYSA-N

LY-301317, also known as (R)-4,α-methylene-5-(1,3-oxazol-5-yl)-N,N-dipropyltryptamine ((R)-4,α-methylene-5-(1,3-oxazol-5-yl)-DPT), is a potent and selective serotonin 5-HT_{1A} receptor agonist which has been used in scientific research. It is a cyclized tryptamine and a partial ergoline. The drug shows very high affinity for the serotonin 5-HT_{1A} receptor, with a K_{i} of 0.26 nM, and is highly selective for this receptor over 9 other assessed targets. It produces various serotonin 5-HT_{1A} receptor agonist-associated effects in animals, including behavioral effects, hypothermia, antidepressant-like, anxiolytic-like, and antiemetic effects, and discriminative stimulus effects in drug discrimination tests. LY-301317 was first described in the scientific literature in 1996.

== See also ==
- Partial ergoline
- Cyclized tryptamine
- LY-178210 (LY-228729)
- LY-293284
