= Oxytocin/ergometrine =

Combination drug

Combination of
- Oxytocin: Hypothalamic hormone
- Ergometrine: Ergot alkaloid

Clinical data
- Routes of administration: Intramuscular injection

Legal status
- Legal status: In general: ℞ (Prescription only)

Identifiers
- CAS Number: 37209-62-4
- PubChem CID: 11979741

Oxytocin/ergometrine (trade name Syntometrine) is an obstetric combination drug. The components are synthetically produced oxytocin, a human hormone produced in the hypothalamus, and ergometrine, an alpha-adrenergic, dopaminergic and serotonin (5-HT_{2}) receptor agonist.

Both substances cause the uterus to contract. An injection of Syntometrine is given in the third stage of labor, just after the birth of the child to facilitate delivery of the placenta and to prevent postpartum hemorrhage by causing smooth muscle tissue in the blood vessel walls to narrow, thereby reducing blood flow.

== Contraindications ==
Syntometrine should not be used in patients with:

- Allergy to one or any of its ingredients
- First stage of labor
- Second stage of labor before crowning of the baby's head
- Severe kidney disorders
- Severe liver disorders
- Severe heart disorders
- Vascular diseases
- Severe hypertension
- Pre-eclampsia or eclampsia
- Sepsis

It should be used with caution in patients with:

- Decreased kidney function
- Decreased liver function
- Mild heart disease
- Mild hypertension
- Porphyria

== Side effects ==
Possible side effects include:

- Nausea and vomiting
- Abdominal pain, feeling different than labor pains
- Headache
- Dizziness
- Skin rashes, itching or hives
- Swelling of face, lips, tongue or other body parts
- Hypertension
- Arrhythmias (abnormal heart beats)
- Chest pain
- Fall in blood pressure (causing dizziness and lightheadedness)
- Difficulty in breathing
- Circulatory shock

A health care provider should be notified immediately if there are any side effects. They may be signs of allergy or of too much fluid associated with high doses or long infusions.

== Drug interactions ==
Prostaglandins increase the effect of oxytocin and vice versa. The contractions should be carefully monitored if oxytocin is given after a prostaglandin dose.

Syntometrine may enhance the blood pressure raising effect of vasoconstrictors (medicines given to constrict the blood vessels).

Some inhaled anaesthetics used for general anesthesia, such as cyclopropane and halothane, may reduce the effect of oxytocin and ergometrine. There may also be an increased risk of a drop in blood pressure and abnormal heart beats if oxytocin is given with these general anesthetics.
