= Ergonovine =

Lysergamide

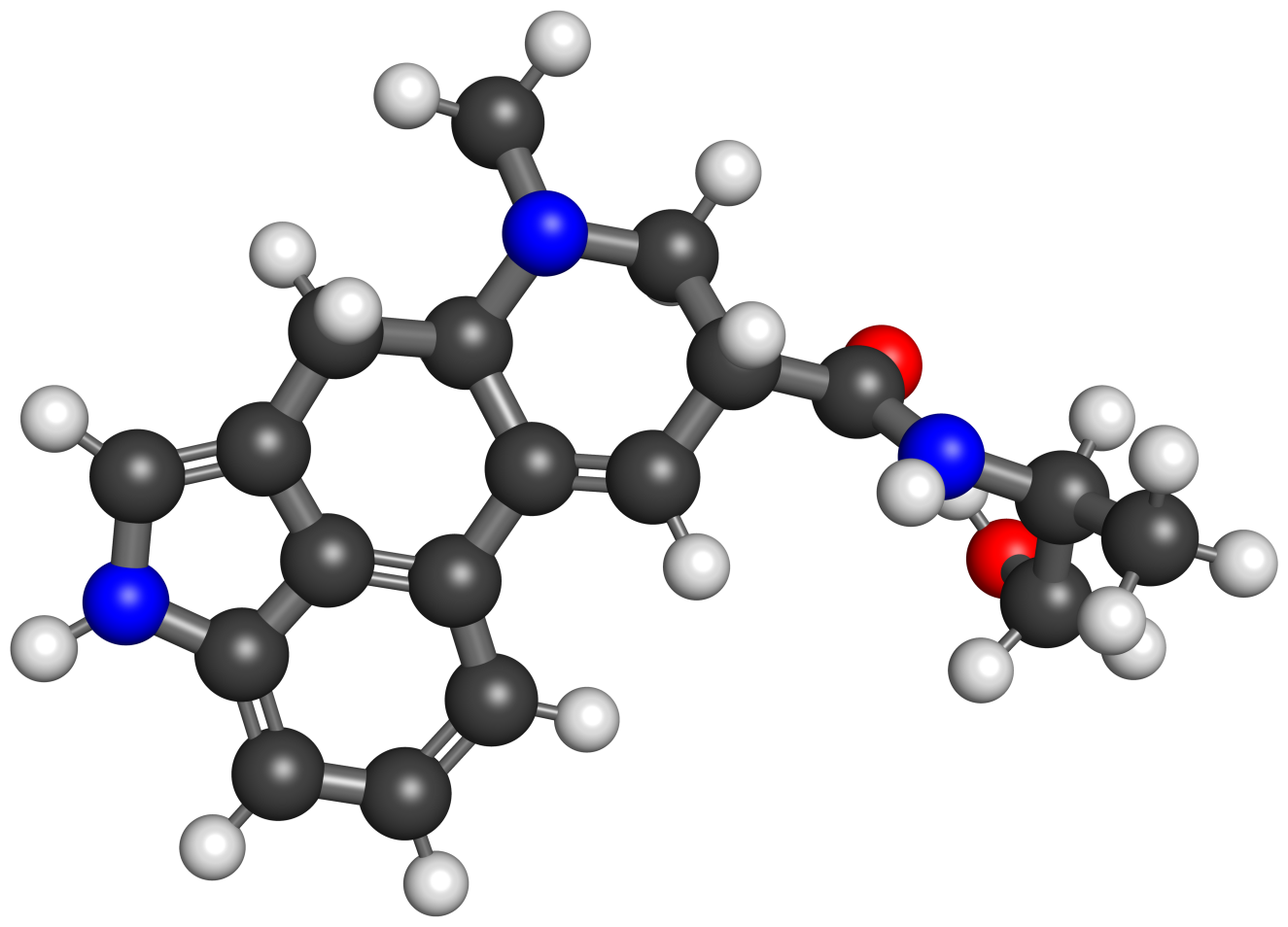

Clinical data
- Trade names: Ergotrate, Ergotrate Maleate
- Other names: Ergometrine; Ergobasin; Ergotocine; Ergostetrine; Lysergic acid propanolamide; Lysergic acid hydroxymethylethylamide; ᴅ-Lysergic acid-1,2-propanolamide; ᴅ-Lysergic acid 1-(hydroxymethyl)ethylamide; ᴅ(+)-Lysergic acid-β-hydroxyisopropylamide
- AHFS/Drugs.com: Monograph
- Routes of administration: oral, intramuscular, intravenous
- Drug class: Serotonin receptor agonist; Serotonin 5-HT_{2A} receptor agonist; Uterotonic; Serotonergic psychedelic; Hallucinogen
- ATC code: G02AB03 (WHO)

Legal status
- Legal status: BR: Class D1 (Drug precursors); CA: Schedule VI; US: ℞-only

Pharmacokinetic data
- Metabolism: Liver (partly CYP3A4)
- Elimination half-life: 2-phase (10 min; 2 hrs)
- Excretion: Bile duct

Identifiers
- IUPAC name: (6aR,9R)-N-((S)-1-Hydroxypropan- 2-yl)-7-methyl-4,6,6a,7,8,9-hexahydroindolo[4,3-fg]quinoline-9-carboxamide
- CAS Number: 60-79-7
- PubChem CID: 443884
- IUPHAR/BPS: 148
- DrugBank: DB01253
- ChemSpider: 391970
- UNII: WH41D8433D
- KEGG: D07905
- ChEBI: CHEBI:4822
- ChEMBL: ChEMBL119443
- CompTox Dashboard (EPA): DTXSID8046323
- ECHA InfoCard: 100.000.441

Chemical and physical data
- Formula: C_{19}H_{23}N_{3}O_{2}
- Molar mass: 325.412 g·mol^{−1}
- 3D model (JSmol): Interactive image
- SMILES: [H][C@@]12Cc3c[nH]c4cccc(C1=C[C@@H](C(=O)N[C@@H](C)CO)CN2C)c34
- InChI: InChI=1S/C19H23N3O2/c1-11(10-23)21-19(24)13-6-15-14-4-3-5-16-18(14)12(8-20-16)7-17(15)22(2)9-13/h3-6,8,11,13,17,20,23H,7,9-10H2,1-2H3,(H,21,24)/t11-,13+,17+/m0/s1; Key:WVVSZNPYNCNODU-XTQGRXLLSA-N

Ergonovine, also known as ergometrine and lysergic acid propanolamide, is a medication used to cause contractions of the uterus to treat heavy vaginal bleeding after childbirth. It can be used either by mouth, by injection into a muscle, or injection into a vein.

Common side effects include high blood pressure, vomiting, seizures, headache, and low blood pressure. Other serious side effects include ergotism.

Ergonovine was discovered in 1932. It is on the World Health Organization's List of Essential Medicines. Ergonovine is controlled in some countries because it can be used to make the psychedelic drug lysergic acid diethylamide (LSD). It is also known to produce psychedelic effects itself at high doses.

== Medical uses ==
Ergonovine has a medical use in obstetrics to facilitate delivery of the placenta and to prevent bleeding after childbirth by causing smooth muscle tissue in the blood vessel walls to narrow, thereby reducing blood flow. It is usually combined with oxytocin (Syntocinon) as syntometrine. It begins working within 15 minutes when taken by mouth and is faster in onset when used by injection. Its duration is between 45 and 180 minutes.

It can induce spasm of the coronary arteries. It is used to diagnose variant (Prinzmetal's) angina.

== Side effects ==
Possible side effects include nausea, vomiting, abdominal pain, diarrhea, headache, dizziness, tinnitus, chest pain, palpitation, bradycardia, transient hypertension and other cardiac arrhythmias, dyspnea, rashes, and shock. An overdose produces a characteristic poisoning, ergotism or "St. Anthony's fire": prolonged vasospasm resulting in gangrene and amputations; hallucinations and dementia; unsafe abortions.

Gastrointestinal disturbances such as diarrhea, nausea, and vomiting, are common. The drug is contraindicated in pregnancy, vascular disease, and psychosis. It passes on in breastmilk and can cause side effects (ergotism) in nursing infants. Ergonovine is used postpartum after the delivery of the placenta, and after ruling out the possibility of twins probably to stop bleeding. It is in (Australia) AU Pregnancy category C, like ergotamine/caffeine. Use during pregnancy can cause harm to the fetus.

== Pharmacology ==
=== Pharmacodynamics ===
Ergonovine stimulates the uterus and other smooth muscles. It targets α-adrenergic, dopaminergic, and serotonin receptors (the 5-HT_{2} receptor). Its uterotonic effect has not been identified with a specific receptor type. The drug has been found to bind to and activate the rat and human serotonin 5-HT_{2A} receptor with similar affinity as lysergic acid diethylamide (LSD). Ergonovine is an agonist of the serotonin 5-HT_{2B} receptor and has been associated with cardiac valvulopathy. A computer-predicted binding profile of ergonovine at an array of serotonin, dopamine, and other receptors has been published. It was predicted to bind to most of the serotonin receptors with moderately high affinity, albeit lower than LSD. Ergometrine produces the head-twitch response, a behavioral proxy of psychedelic effects, in rodents. However, it was 222-fold less potent than LSD in producing this effect.

== Chemistry ==
=== Synthesis ===
Ergonovine was originally made from the rye ergot fungus but can also be made from lysergic acid.

=== Analogues ===
Analogues of ergonovine include methylergometrine (methylergonovine), methysergide, propisergide, LY-215840, and LY-53857, among others.

A simplified analogue of ergonovine that was also investigated as an oxytocic is tochergamine.

== Natural occurrence ==
According to Albert Hofmann and other researchers, although ergonovine is naturally occurring in morning glory seeds and is known to produce psychedelic effects at higher doses, it is present in too small of amounts to contribute to their psychoactive or hallucinogenic effects.

== History ==
The pharmacological properties of ergot were known and had been utilized by midwives for centuries, but were not thoroughly researched and publicized until the early 20th century. However, its abortifacient effects and the danger of ergotism meant that it was only prescribed cautiously, as in the treatment of postpartum haemorrhage.

Ergonovine was first isolated and obtained by the chemists C Moir, H W Dudley and Gerald Rogers in 1935. Caroline De Costa has argued that the adoption of ergonovine for preventive use and for treating bleeding contributed to the decline in the maternal mortality rate in much of the West during the early 20th century.

== Society and culture ==
=== Recreational use ===
Ergonovine induces hallucinogenic effects at doses of 2–10 mg, in contrast to its medical use in doses of 0.2–0.4 mg. The most common source of ergonovine for drug users is Ipomoea tricolor seeds, as they are the only commonly available natural product that hosts an ergoline-generating fungus. The ergonovine content of I. tricolor seeds varies between one-tenth and one-third of ergine, an ergonovine analog. One person who had the opportunity to try ergonovine to see its psychedelic potential stated that it was mild relative to other psychedelics, but that ergine may synergize with it; indeed the contrast between Hofmann's self-administration of Ipomoea corymbosa extract and synthetic ergine is apparent in his essay on the initial analysis of I. corymbosa and I. tricolor seeds.

The psychoactive property of these simple lysergic acid amides, closely related to LSD, is well established. The question presented itself whether ergonovine, being not only an alkaloidal component of ergot but also of ololiuhqui, possessed hallucinogenic activity. In the light of its chemical structure this did not seem unlikely: it does not differ much from LSD. But one may ask why, if it is hallucinogenic, this astonishing fact has not been announced, in the light of its use over recent decades in obstetrics. Undoubtedly the answer lies in the extremely low dosage of ergonovine used to stop postpartum bleeding, viz 0.1 to 0.25 mg. The effective dose of lysergic acid amide is 1 to 2 mg by oral application. I decided therefore to test in a self-experiment a corresponding dose of ergonovine [...]

=== Legal status ===
Ergonovine is listed as Table I precursors under the United Nations Convention Against Illicit Traffic in Narcotic Drugs and Psychotropic Substances, as possible precursor compound for LSD. It is also regulated in the United States. As an N-alkyl derivative of ergine, ergonovine is covered by the Misuse of Drugs Act 1971, effectively rendering it illegal in the United Kingdom as well.

== See also ==
- Substituted lysergamide
- Methylergometrine
- Morning glory (drug)
