= Bay R 1531 =

Chemical compound

Clinical data
- Other names: LY-197206; LY197206; 4,α-Methylene-5-methoxy-N,N-dipropyltryptamine; 4,α-Methylene-5-MeO-DPT
- Drug class: Serotonin 5-HT_{1A} receptor agonist; Simplified/partial LSD analogue
- ATC code: None

Identifiers
- IUPAC name: 1,3,4,5-tetrahydro-6-methoxy-N,N-dipropyl-benz[cd]indol-4-amine
- CAS Number: 98770-54-8
- PubChem CID: 127153
- PubChem SID: 274136915
- ChemSpider: 112872
- CompTox Dashboard (EPA): DTXSID80913088

Chemical and physical data
- Formula: C_{18}H_{26}N_{2}O
- Molar mass: 286.419 g·mol^{−1}
- 3D model (JSmol): Interactive image
- SMILES: COc2ccc1[nH]cc3CC(Cc2c13)N(CCC)CCC
- InChI: InChI=1S/C18H26N2O/c1-4-8-20(9-5-2)14-10-13-12-19-16-6-7-17(21-3)15(11-14)18(13)16/h6-7,12,14,19H,4-5,8-11H2,1-3H3; Key:BMZWFSGTPJUKJR-UHFFFAOYSA-N

Bay R 1531, also known as LY-197206 or as 4,α-methylene-5-MeO-DPT, is a tricyclic tryptamine derivative. It acts as a selective serotonin 5-HT_{1A} receptor agonist. It was investigated unsuccessfully for the treatment of stroke but continues to be used in scientific research. It shows very high affinity for the serotonin 5-HT_{1A} receptor (K_{i} = 1.3 nM).

== See also ==
- Partial lysergamide
- 6-MeO-RU-28306
- 8-OH-DPAT
- RDS-127
- RU-27849
- RU-28306
- LY-178210
- LY-293,284
- NDTDI
