= UH-301 =

Chemical compound

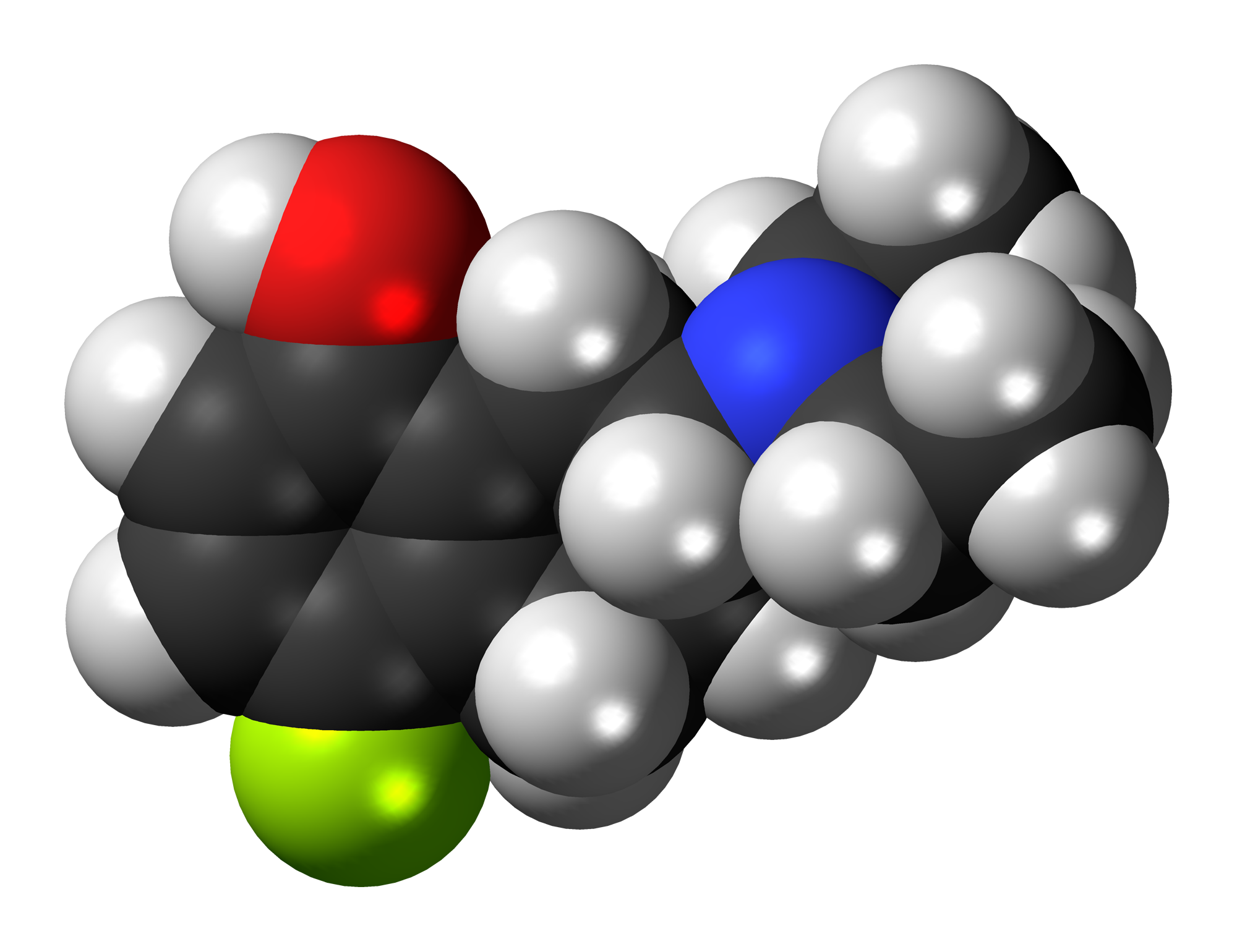

Clinical data
- Other names: UH301; (S)-5-Fluoro-8-hydroxy-2-(dipropylamino)tetralin; (S)-5-FHDPAT
- Drug class: Serotonin 5-HT_{1A} receptor antagonist
- ATC code: None

Identifiers
- IUPAC name: (7S)-7-(dipropylamino)-4-fluoro-5,6,7,8-tetrahydronaphthalen-1-ol
- CAS Number: 127126-21-0
- PubChem CID: 122187
- IUPHAR/BPS: 61
- ChemSpider: 108977
- UNII: 1G916IMD7L
- ChEMBL: ChEMBL22778
- CompTox Dashboard (EPA): DTXSID70155410

Chemical and physical data
- Formula: C_{16}H_{24}FNO
- Molar mass: 265.372 g·mol^{−1}
- 3D model (JSmol): Interactive image
- SMILES: CCCN(CCC)[C@H]1CCC2=C(C=CC(=C2C1)O)F
- InChI: InChI=1S/C16H24FNO/c1-3-9-18(10-4-2)12-5-6-13-14(11-12)16(19)8-7-15(13)17/h7-8,12,19H,3-6,9-11H2,1-2H3/t12-/m0/s1; Key:FNKBVTBXFLSTPB-LBPRGKRZSA-N

UH-301, also known as (S)-5-fluoro-8-hydroxy-2-(dipropylamino)tetralin ((S)-5-FHDPAT), is a drug and research chemical widely used in scientific studies. It acts as a selective serotonin 5-HT_{1A} receptor silent antagonist. It is structurally related to 8-OH-DPAT. UH-301 was found to produce a head-twitch response in mice which is usually typical of 5-HT_{2A} agonist drugs, and has subsequently been used to investigate how 5-HT_{1A} receptor activity modulates 5-HT_{2A} receptors downstream.

== See also ==
- Substituted 2-aminotetralin
- 4-HO-DPT
- Robalzotan
- UH-232
