= RDS-127 =

Chemical compound

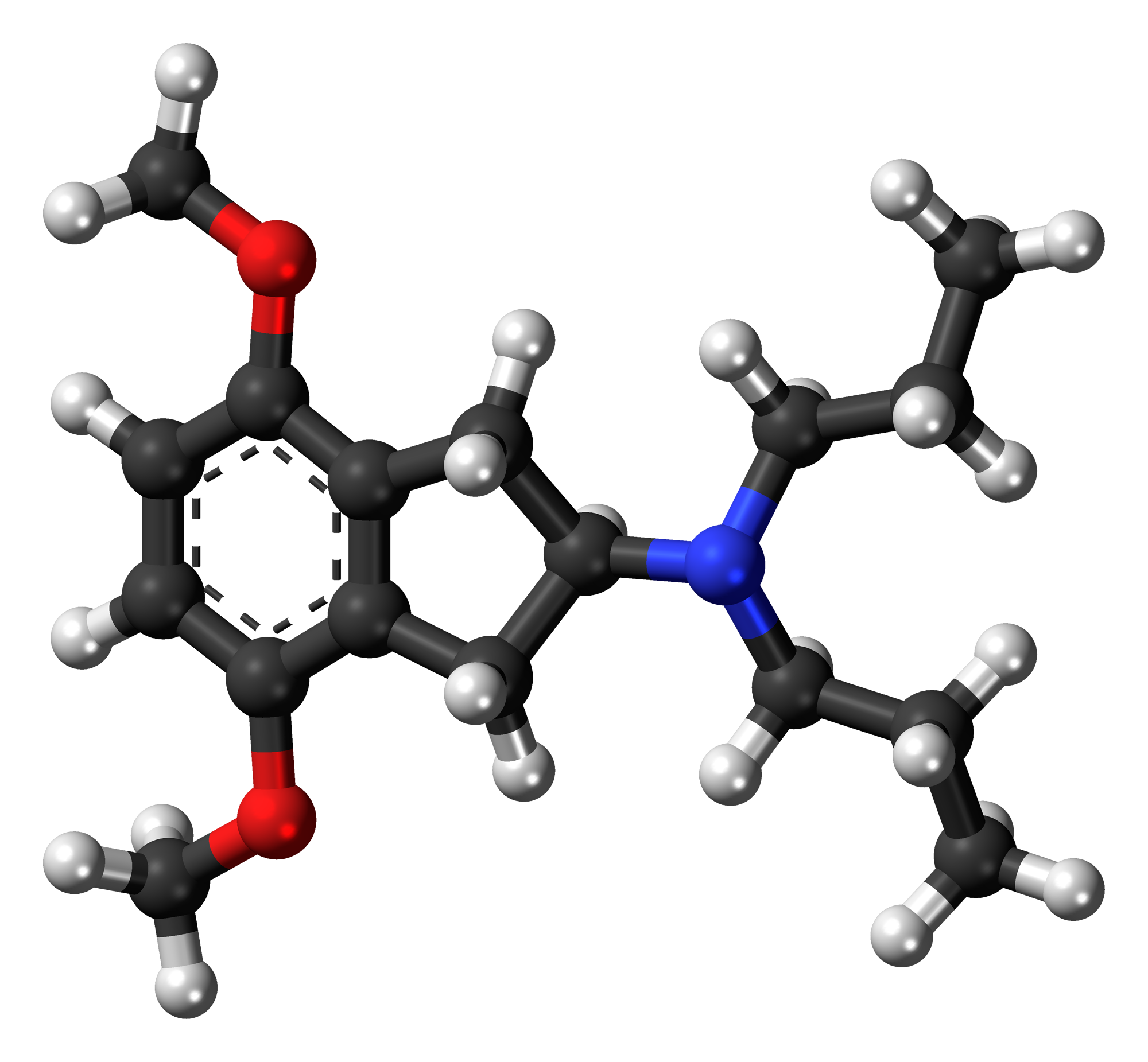

Clinical data
- Other names: RDS127; 4,7-Dimethoxy-2-(dipropylamino)indane; 4,7-Dimethoxy-N,N-dipropyl-2-aminoindane; 4,7-DM-DP-2-AI
- Drug class: Dopamine receptor agonist
- ATC code: None

Identifiers
- IUPAC name: 4,7-dimethoxy-N,N-dipropyl-2,3-dihydro-1H-inden-2-amine
- CAS Number: 82668-32-4
- PubChem CID: 134064
- ChemSpider: 118214
- UNII: H38HAQ9VV8
- CompTox Dashboard (EPA): DTXSID70231945

Chemical and physical data
- Formula: C_{17}H_{27}NO_{2}
- Molar mass: 277.408 g·mol^{−1}
- 3D model (JSmol): Interactive image
- SMILES: CCCN(CCC)C1CC2=C(C=CC(=C2C1)OC)OC
- InChI: InChI=1S/C17H27NO2/c1-5-9-18(10-6-2)13-11-14-15(12-13)17(20-4)8-7-16(14)19-3/h7-8,13H,5-6,9-12H2,1-4H3; Key:FPAHQTSJKYIURQ-UHFFFAOYSA-N

RDS-127, also known as 4,7-dimethoxy-N,N-dipropyl-2-aminoindane, is a drug of the 2-aminoindane family which is used in scientific research. It acts as a D_{2}-like receptor agonist and also has some serotonin and adrenergic agonist effects, as well as some anticholinergic action, and produces both anorectic and pro-sexual effects in animal studies.

== See also ==
- Substituted 2-aminoindane
- PNU-99,194
- 8-OH-DPAT
- UH-232
- Bay R 1531
