= UCD0179 =

Clinical data
- Other names: 4-Desmethylene-LSD; 4-Nor-LSD; 3,5-Seco-LSD; Des-C-LSD; UCD0179; UCD-0179; DEIMDHPCA; "Compound 11"
- Drug class: Serotonin 5-HT_{2} receptor agonist; Psychoplastogen; Simplified/partial LSD analogue
- ATC code: None

Identifiers
- IUPAC name: (3R)-N,N-diethyl-5-(1H-indol-4-yl)-1-methyl-3,6-dihydro-2H-pyridine-3-carboxamide
- CAS Number: 2640392-28-3
- PubChem CID: 156278040

Chemical and physical data
- Formula: C_{19}H_{25}N_{3}O
- Molar mass: 311.429 g·mol^{−1}
- 3D model (JSmol): Interactive image
- SMILES: CCN(CC)C(=O)[C@H]1CN(CC(=C1)C2=C3C=CNC3=CC=C2)C
- InChI: InChI=1S/C19H25N3O/c1-4-22(5-2)19(23)15-11-14(12-21(3)13-15)16-7-6-8-18-17(16)9-10-20-18/h6-11,15,20H,4-5,12-13H2,1-3H3/t15-/m1/s1; Key:GDCMLRPQENDWLG-OAHLLOKOSA-N

UCD0179, also known as 4-desmethylene-LSD or 3,5-seco-LSD, is an indole derivative and a "partial" or simplified lysergamide which is closely related to the highly potent serotonergic psychedelic lysergic acid diethylamide (LSD). It is specifically the analogue of LSD in which one of LSD's carbon atoms in the ergoline ring system, the carbon at position 4, has been removed. This in turn renders the molecule more flexible and makes it a partially conformationally constrained indolic phenethylamine-containing compound rather than an ergoline. UCD0179 is known to be a highly potent serotonin 5-HT_{2} receptor agonist similarly to LSD and to produce psychoplastogenic effects.

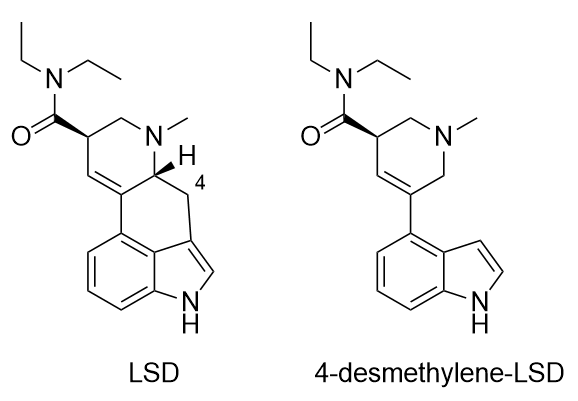
Structures of LSD (left) and UCD0179 (right).

== Pharmacology ==
=== Pharmacodynamics ===
Like LSD, the drug is known to be a highly potent serotonin 5-HT_{2A} and 5-HT_{2C} receptor agonist in vitro. Its affinities (IC_{50}) are in the ranges of 10–100 nM for the serotonin 5-HT_{2A} receptor and 100–1,000 nM for the serotonin 5-HT_{2C} receptor, while its activational potencies (EC_{50}) are less than 10 nM for the serotonin 5-HT_{2A} receptor and in the range of 10–100 nM for the serotonin 5-HT_{2C} receptor. UCD0179 was the most potent serotonin 5-HT_{2A} receptor agonist of 27 evaluated ergoline-like compounds. In line with its serotonin 5-HT_{2A} receptor agonism, and similarly to LSD and other psychedelics, UCD0179 has been found to produce psychoplastogenic effects on neurite growth in vitro.

Many serotonin 5-HT_{2A} receptor agonists, for instance LSD, produce psychedelic effects in humans. The publication that reported UCD0179 specifically pertained to psychoplastogenic ergoline-like compounds with no or reduced hallucinogenic activity for potential therapeutic use. However, the hallucinogenic-related properties of UCD0179 and the other reported compounds, for instance their effects in the head-twitch response (HTR) assay, were not individually described. As such, it remains unclear whether or not UCD0179 could have psychedelic effects in humans.

== Chemistry ==
=== Related compounds ===
Other related compounds in which one or more other carbons have been removed from the LSD's ergoline ring system to produce simplified and less-rigid phenethylamines and tryptamines include N-DEAOP-NMT (desvinyl-LSD) and NDTDI (9-desmethine-LSD). Desvinyl-LSD is the analogue of LSD in which the carbon atoms at positions 9 and 10 of the ergoline ring system have been removed to make a fully non-rigid tryptamine, while 9-desmethine is the analogue of LSD in which the methine at position 9 has been removed to make a rigid tricyclic tryptamine. Desvinyl-LSD has been found to produce LSD-like effects in rodents, while 9-desmethine-LSD has been encountered as a novel recreational and designer drug and made illegal in parts of Europe.

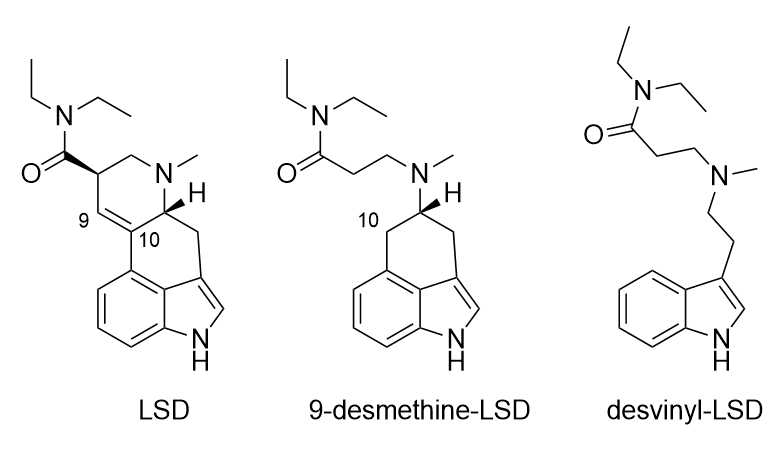
Structures of LSD (left), NDTDI (9-desmethine-LSD) (middle), and N-DEAOP-NMT (desvinyl-LSD) (right).

The analogue of UCD0179 without the ethyl groups on the amide has been described. In addition, UCD0179's analogue without the amide ethyl groups and with a phenyl ring instead of the indole ring has been described. Their activities were not reported.

"WXVL_BT0793LQ2118" chemical structure.

WXVL_BT0793LQ2118, an analogue of UCD0179 lacking the N,N-diethyl-carboxamide moiety and with a fluorine at the 6-position, has been reported. It was identified via in silico screening of 1.6 billion molecules for serotonin 5-HT_{2A} receptor agonism with AlphaFold2. Following identification, the drug was assessed and found to be a potent serotonin 5-HT_{2A}, 5-HT_{2B}, and 5-HT_{2C} receptor agonist.

== History ==
UCD0179 was first described in the literature by 2021. It has been patented by Delix Therapeutics.

== See also ==
- Partial lysergamide
- List of miscellaneous 5-HT_{2A} receptor agonists
- Seco-LSD
