= RU-28306 =

Chemical compound

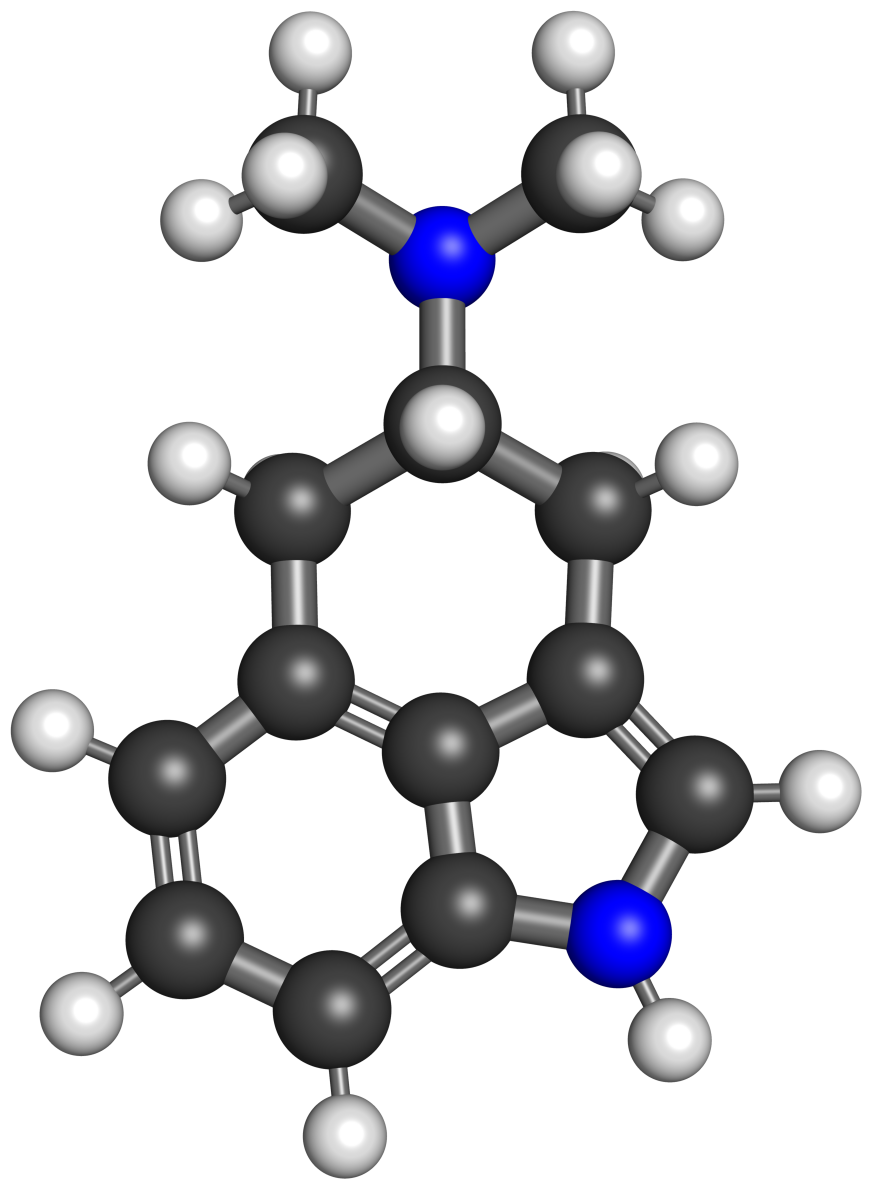

Clinical data
- Other names: RU28306; UCD0094; UCD-0094; 4,α-Methylene-N,N-dimethyltryptamine; 4,α-Methylene-DMT
- Drug class: Serotonin receptor agonist; Serotonin 5-HT_{1} and 5-HT_{2} receptor agonist; Dopamine D_{2} receptor agonist; Simplified/partial LSD analogue
- ATC code: None

Identifiers
- IUPAC name: N,N-dimethyl-1,3,4,5-tetrahydrobenzo[cd]indol-4-amine
- CAS Number: 73625-11-3
- PubChem CID: 194528
- ChemSpider: 168785
- UNII: CT4LCW2PLE
- ChEMBL: ChEMBL1180805
- CompTox Dashboard (EPA): DTXSID90994429

Chemical and physical data
- Formula: C_{13}H_{16}N_{2}
- Molar mass: 200.285 g·mol^{−1}
- 3D model (JSmol): Interactive image
- SMILES: c13c(C2)cccc1[nH]cc3CC2N(C)C
- InChI: InChI=1S/C13H16N2/c1-15(2)11-6-9-4-3-5-12-13(9)10(7-11)8-14-12/h3-5,8,11,14H,6-7H2,1-2H3; Key:BQOANWOQEHVATQ-UHFFFAOYSA-N

RU-28306, also known as UCD0094 or as 4,α-methylene-N,N-dimethyltryptamine (4,α-methylene-DMT), is a non-selective serotonin receptor agonist as well as dopamine receptor agonist. It is a cyclized tryptamine, specifically a conformationally restricted tricyclic derivative of dimethyltryptamine (DMT), and can also be considered a partial ergoline or simplified and deconstructed analogue of LSD. However, unlike DMT and LSD, RU-28306 does not show psychedelic-like effects in animals.

== Pharmacology ==
=== Pharmacodynamics ===
RU-28306 shows affinity for the serotonin 5-HT_{1A} receptor (K_{i} = 329 nM) and 5-HT_{2A} receptor (K_{i} = 41–314 nM in different assays). Its affinity for the serotonin 5-HT_{2A} receptor was almost 2-fold higher than that of dimethyltryptamine (DMT) and 7-fold lower than that of LSD. The drug acts as a potent partial agonist of the serotonin 5-HT_{2A}, 5-HT_{2B}, and 5-HT_{2C} receptors. Its EC_{50} (E_{max}) values were 8.09 nM (52%) at the serotonin 5-HT_{2A} receptor, 22.8 nM (33%) at the serotonin 5-HT_{2B} receptor, and 11.1 nM (80%) at the serotonin 5-HT_{2C} receptor. RU-28306 showed 15-fold lower potency as a serotonin 5-HT_{2A} receptor agonist and had about half the activational efficacy compared to LSD.

In addition to its actions as a serotonin receptor modulator, RU-28306 has been found to show affinity for dopamine receptors and to act as a dopamine receptor agonist, including suppressing prolactin secretion in rodents. Subsequently, in a more modern study, it was shown to act as a potent partial agonist specifically of the dopamine D_{2} receptor (EC_{50} = 29 nM; E_{max} = 78%).

RU-28306 failed to produce the head-twitch, a behavioral proxy of psychedelic effects, in rodents. This was in contrast to LSD, which robustly induces the response, and suggests that RU-28306 may lack hallucinogenic effects in humans. Due to the fact that it activates the serotonin 5-HT_{2A} receptor without producing the head-twitch response, RU-28306 has been proposed as a potential non-hallucinogenic psychoplastogen and attractive lead compound for other such agents.

== Chemistry ==
=== Synthesis ===
The chemical synthesis of RU-28306 has been described. The synthesis requires 13 steps and has only 8% overall yield. An asymmetric synthesis of RU-28306 to obtain its individual enantiomers has been published.

=== Analogues ===
RU-28306 shows far lower affinity for the serotonin 5-HT_{1A} receptor than certain analogues like Bay R 1531 (LY-197206) and LY-178210 (LY-228729) (K_{i} = 329 nM and 0.67–1.3 nM, respectively). Other analogues of RU-28306 include 6-MeO-RU-28306, RU-28251, RU-27849, and NDTDI, among others.

== History ==
RU-28306 was first described in the scientific literature by 1981. It was encountered as a novel designer drug and was first reported to the EMCDDA by a forensic laboratory in Slovenia in 2017. The drug was patented by David E. Olson and colleagues at Delix Therapeutics in 2021. Subsequently, it was described in greater detail by Olson and colleagues in 2026.

== See also ==
- Cyclized tryptamine
- Partial lysergamide
