= Paliclavine =

Names
- IUPAC name (9R)-6,8-Dimethyl-7,8-didehydro-6,7-secoergolin-9-ol
- Systematic IUPAC name (1R)-2-Methyl-1-[(4R,5R)-4-(methylamino)-1,3,4,5-tetrahydrobenzo[cd]indol-5-yl]prop-2-en-1-ol

Identifiers
CAS Number	52052-66-1
3D model (JSmol)	Interactive image
ChemSpider	149594
PubChem CID	171115
CompTox Dashboard (EPA)	DTXSID70200015
- InChI: InChI=1S/C16H20N2O/c1-9(2)16(19)15-11-5-4-6-12-14(11)10(8-18-12)7-13(15)17-3/h4-6,8,13,15-19H,1,7H2,2-3H3/t13-,15-,16+/m1/s1 Key: RYJKMWDFKMAASW-BMFZPTHFSA-N; InChI=1/C16H20N2O/c1-9(2)16(19)15-11-5-4-6-12-14(11)10(8-18-12)7-13(15)17-3/h4-6,8,13,15-19H,1,7H2,2-3H3/t13-,15-,16+/m1/s1 Key: RYJKMWDFKMAASW-BMFZPTHFBX
- SMILES: CC(=C)[C@@H]([C@H]1[C@@H](CC2=CNC3=CC=CC1=C23)NC)O

Properties
Chemical formula	C_{16}H_{20}N_{2}O
Molar mass	256.349 g·mol^{−1}
- Except where otherwise noted, data are given for materials in their standard state (at 25 °C [77 °F], 100 kPa). Infobox references

Paliclavine is an ergot alkaloid precursor.
