= UCD0120 =

Clinical data
- Other names: UCD0120; UCD-0120; "Compound 160a"; des-B-des-C-LSD; Dides-B,C-LSD; 1-Deaza-2,3,4-trinor-LSD; DEMPDHPCA
- Drug class: Serotonin 5-HT_{2} receptor agonist; Serotonin 5-HT_{2A} receptor agonist; Serotonergic psychedelic; Hallucinogen; Simplified/partial LSD analogue
- ATC code: None

Identifiers
- IUPAC name: N,N-diethyl-1-methyl-5-phenyl-3,6-dihydro-2H-pyridine-3-carboxamide
- PubChem CID: 156277299

Chemical and physical data
- Formula: C_{17}H_{24}N_{2}O
- Molar mass: 272.392 g·mol^{−1}
- 3D model (JSmol): Interactive image
- SMILES: CCN(CC)C(=O)C1CN(CC(=C1)C2=CC=CC=C2)C
- InChI: InChI=1S/C17H24N2O/c1-4-19(5-2)17(20)16-11-15(12-18(3)13-16)14-9-7-6-8-10-14/h6-11,16H,4-5,12-13H2,1-3H3; Key:DRQYLJPWAXRRHI-UHFFFAOYSA-N

UCD0120, also known as dides-B,C-LSD or as 1-deaza-2,3,4-trinor-LSD, is a psychedelic drug and a cyclized phenethylamine and simplified or partial ergoline that is structurally related to lysergic acid diethylamide (LSD). It is the analogue of LSD in which the carbon and nitrogen atoms at positions 1 through 4 of the ergoline ring system have been removed.

== Pharmacology ==
=== Pharmacodynamics ===
UCD0120 shows affinity for the serotonin 5-HT_{2A} receptor (K_{i} = 175 nM). It is a potent partial agonist of the serotonin 5-HT_{2A} receptor (EC_{50} = 7.48 nM; E_{max} = 63%), serotonin 5-HT_{2B} receptor (EC_{50} = 22.1 nM; E_{max} = 64%), and serotonin 5-HT_{2C} receptor (EC_{50} = 18.0 nM; E_{max} = 89%). The drug was 14-fold less potent than LSD as a serotonin 5-HT_{2A} receptor agonist in vitro.

Early research found that UCD0120 produces gross behavioral effects very similar to those of serotonergic psychedelics like LSD in rodents and has been assumed to act as a hallucinogen likewise. However, the drug has not been tested in humans. UCD0120 is much less potent than LSD in rodents, which was active at a dose of 0.16 μmol/kg by intraperitoneal injection, whereas UCD0120 was active at doses of 10 to 35 μmol/kg (63- to 219-fold less potent). On the other hand, UCD0120 was more potent than dimethyltryptamine (DMT) and is also more potent than mescaline.

Subsequent research has found that UCD0120 indeed produces the head-twitch response, a behavioral proxy of psychedelic effects, in rodents. The maximally effective dose for the response of the assessed doses was 10 mg/kg, whereas that of LSD was 0.1 mg/kg, suggesting that UCD0120 may be on the order of 100-fold less potent than LSD as a psychedelic drug in rodents.

=== Pharmacokinetics ===
The pharmacokinetics of UCD0120 in rodents have been studied.

== Chemistry ==
=== Synthesis ===
The chemical synthesis of UCD0120 has been described.

=== Analogues and derivatives ===
A few derivatives of UCD0120 have also been studied and found to produce similar effects and/or amphetamine-like in animals, including the derivatives with 4-methoxy- and 3,4,5-trimethoxy- substitutions on the phenyl ring and the derivative with the phenyl ring replaced with a 1-naphthalene ring. The former two were less potent than UCD0120, whereas the latter was slightly more potent. Another derivative, UCD0120-2C-D, was attempted to be synthesized by David E. Nichols in his PhD thesis. It is the derivative with 4-methyl and 2,5-dimethoxy substitutions on the phenyl ring. These UCD0120 derivatives are cyclized phenethylamine analogues of various psychedelic- and/or stimulant-related phenethylamines and amphetamines including para-methoxyamphetamine (PMA), mescaline (M), 1-naphthylaminopropane (1-NAP), and 2C-D. Other analogues of UCD0120 such as UCD0179 have also since been described.

Chemical structures of UCD0120, derivatives, and related compounds
UCD0120

UCD0120-PMA (4-methoxy-)

UCD0120-M (3,4,5-trimethoxy-)

UCD0120-NAP (naphthalene analogue)

UCD0120-2C-D (4-methyl-2,5-dimethoxy-)

UCD0179 (indole analogue)

LSD

== History ==
UCD0120 was first described in the scientific literature by Mangner in 1978. It was subsequently patented in 2021 by David E. Olson and colleagues and the patent was assigned to Delix Therapeutics. Later, UCD0120 was described in greater detail by Olson and colleagues in 2026.

== See also ==
- Partial lysergamide
- List of miscellaneous 5-HT_{2A} receptor agonists
