= N-DEAOP-NMT =

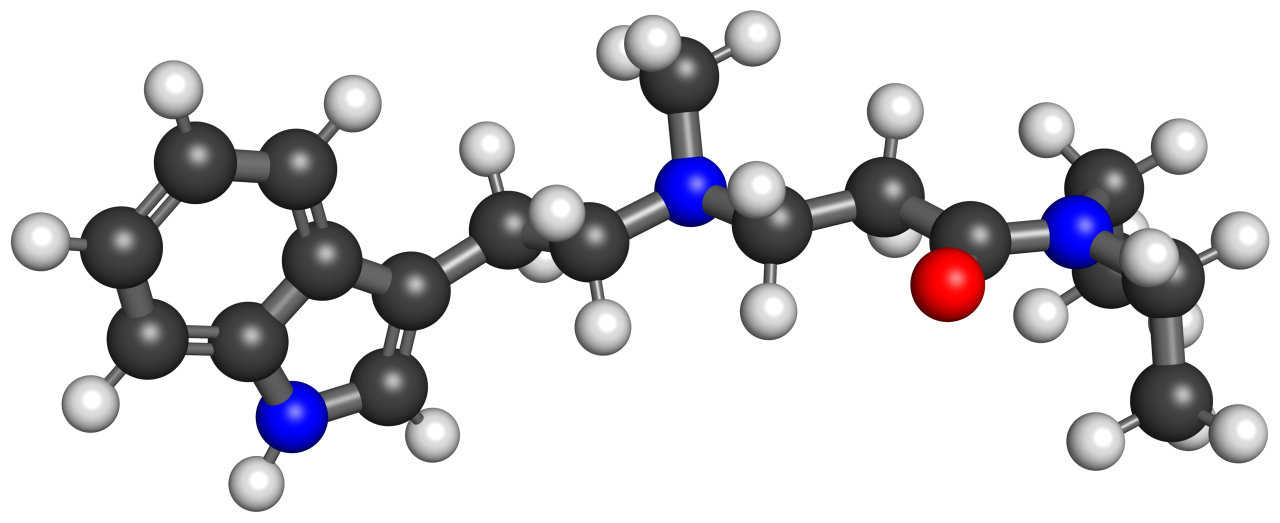

Clinical data
- Other names: N-(3-Diethylamino-3-oxopropyl)-NMT; N-DEAOP-NMT; N-(2-Diethylcarbamoylethyl)-N-methyltryptamine; N-DECE-NMT; NMT-N-(CH_{2}-CH_{2}-CONEt_{2}); Desvinyl-LSD; Devinyl-LSD; 9,10-Dinor-LSD
- Drug class: Simplified/partial LSD analogue

Chemical and physical data
- Formula: C_{18}H_{27}N_{3}O
- Molar mass: 301.434 g·mol^{−1}
- 3D model (JSmol): Interactive image
- SMILES: CCN(CC)C(=O)CCN(C)CCc1c[nH]c2ccccc12
- InChI: InChI=1S/C18H27N3O/c1-4-21(5-2)18(22)11-13-20(3)12-10-15-14-19-17-9-7-6-8-16(15)17/h6-9,14,19H,4-5,10-13H2,1-3H3; Key:KRNAXWYCPYUSGZ-UHFFFAOYSA-N

N-(3-Diethylamino-3-oxopropyl)-N-methyltryptamine (N-DEAOP-NMT), also known as desvinyl-LSD or 9,10-dinor-LSD, is a tryptamine derivative and a "partial" or simplified lysergamide which is closely related to the highly potent serotonergic psychedelic lysergic acid diethylamide (LSD). It is the analogue of LSD in which two of LSD's carbon atoms in the ergoline ring, those at positions 9 and 10, have been removed. This in turn renders the N-DEAOP-NMT molecule flexible and makes it a non-rigid tryptamine rather than an ergoline. The compound is pharmacologically active, as are a number of its analogues and derivatives, with activities of the compounds including serotonin 5-HT_{2A} receptor agonism and LSD- or hallucinogen-like effects.

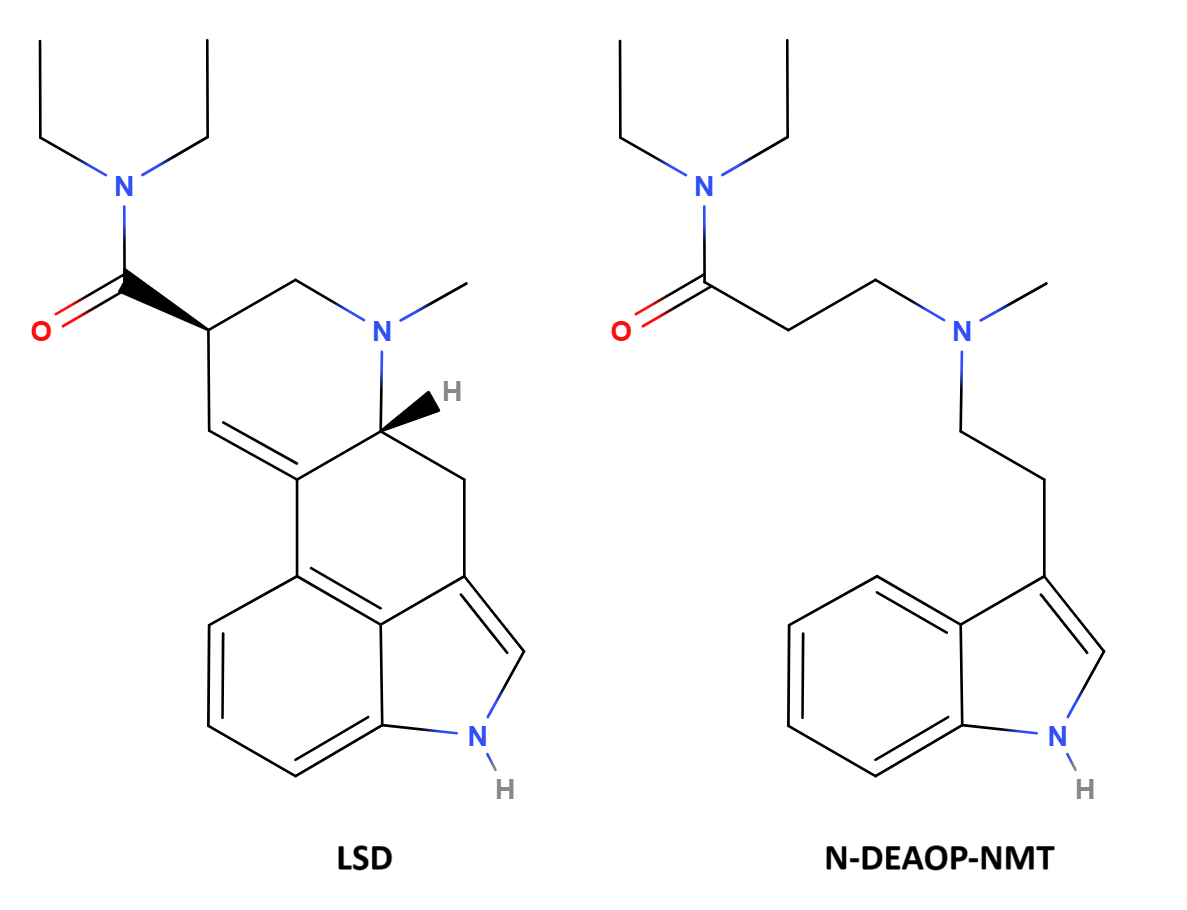
LSD (left) and N-DEAOP-NMT (right) chemical structures.

== Pharmacology ==
N-DEAOP-NMT has been found to produce quantifiable oxytocic effects in animals. However, in contrast to other lysergamides such as lysergic acid and ergonovine (ergometrine), N-DEAOP-NMT was said to not possess significant oxytocic activity relative to clinically used oxytocic drugs, and hence to have little such activity. On the other hand, it was noted to possess 10-fold greater oxytocic activity than that of N-(3-diethylamino-3-oxopropyl)-N-methylphenethylamine (N-DEAOP-NMPEA or PEA-NM-NDEPA), a phenethylamine-based simplified and non-rigid LSD analogue that was also evaluated in the study. The oxytocic effects of ergolines like ergonovine and methylergonovine (methylergometrine) are thought to most likely be mediated by agonism of serotonin 5-HT_{2} receptors in uterine smooth muscle tissue. Relatedly, activation of serotonin 5-HT_{2A} receptors in the brain is also the mechanism of action underlying the hallucinogenic effects of LSD and other serotonergic psychedelics.

== Chemistry ==
=== Analogues and derivatives ===
==== N-DEAOP-NET ====
N-DEAOP-NET chemical structure.

The N-ethyl variant of N-DEAOP-NMT, as opposed to N-DEAOP-NMT itself (which is the N-methyl form), is N-(3-diethylamino-3-oxopropyl)-N-ethyltryptamine (N-DEAOP-NET), and has been described. This compound is a simplified and non-rigid analogue of ETH-LAD rather than of LSD (which is also known as "METH-LAD"). In contrast to N-DEAOP-NMT, N-DEAOP-NET has been evaluated specifically for LSD- or hallucinogen-like effects in animals. LSD produced a typical behavioral and physiological syndrome at an effective-to-fatal dose range of 0.1–5.0 mg/kg in rats, whereas the range for N-DEAOP-NET was 1.0–10.0 mg/kg. The effects of N-DEAOP-NET were qualitatively similar to those of LSD, and included strong mydriasis, hyperreflexia, tremors, hypothermia, hyperactivity, skin hyperemia, stereotypy, fearful reactions, and disorientation, among others. Based on the preceding findings, it has been concluded that N-DEAOP-NET shows LSD-like effects and hence may produce psychedelic effects in humans but is about 10 times less potent than LSD at least in rodents. Various other analogues were also assessed and described.

==== 5-MeO-N-DEAOP-NMT ====
N-DEAOP-5-MeO-NMT chemical structure.

The 5-methoxy analogue of N-DEAOP-NMT, N-(3-diethylamino-3-oxopropyl)-N-methyl-5-methoxytryptamine (5-MeO-N-DEAOP-NMT), also known as N-(2-diethylcarbamoylethyl)-N-methyl-5-methoxytryptamine (5-MeO-N-DECE-NMT), has been described. Its affinities (K_{i}) for serotonin receptors were 21 nM for the serotonin 5-HT_{1A} receptor, 697 nM for the serotonin 5-HT_{2A} receptor, and 1,184 nM for the serotonin 5-HT_{2C} receptor. For comparison, the serotonergic psychedelic dimethyltryptamine (DMT) had affinities for these receptors of 38 nM, 1,093 nM, and 211 nM, respectively, while the psychedelic 5-MeO-DMT had affinities of 4.2 nM, 558 nM, and 187 nM, respectively. 5-MeO-N-DEAOP-NMT was a partial agonist of the serotonin 5-HT_{2A} receptor, with an EC_{50} of 2,338 nM and an E_{max} of 16–40%, whereas DMT was a partial agonist with an EC_{50} of 2,239 nM and an E_{max} of 16–41% while 5-MeO-DMT was a partial to full agonist with an EC_{50} of 741 nM and an E_{max} of 57–98%. Hence, 5-MeO-N-DEAOP-NMT showed fairly similar affinities for serotonin receptors and activational potencies and efficacies at the serotonin 5-HT_{2A} receptor compared to the well-known DMT. N-DEAOP-NMT was also included in the study, but its values were not reported.

==== 5-MeO-N-DEAOP-NET ====
N-DEAOP-5-MeO-NET chemical structure.

5-MeO-N-DEAOP-NET, or N-(3-diethylamino-3-oxopropyl)-N-ethyl-5-methoxytryptamine, the 5-methoxy analogue of N-DEAOP-NET, was also notably evaluated in the previously discussed animal study of LSD-like effects with N-DEAOP-NET and other analogues, but it was not as potent as N-DEAOP-NET and its dose range was not reported.

==== N-DEAOP-NMPEA ====
N-DEAOP-NMPEA (PEA-NM-NDEPA) chemical structure.

N-(3-Diethylamino-3-oxopropyl)-N-methylphenethylamine (N-DEAOP-NMPEA or PEA-NM-NDEPA), also known as 1-deaza-2,3,4,9-tetranor-LSD, is a phenethylamine-based simplified and non-rigid LSD analogue that is related to N-DEAOP-NMT. It is the N-methylated analogue of the parent compound of the PEA-NDEPA (N-DEAOP-PEA) series of compounds, such as DOB-NDEPA, DOI-NDEPA, DOTFM-NDEPA, and 25D-NM-NDEAOP (25D-NM-NDEPA). The compound showed very weak oxytocic activity, 10-fold less potent than N-DEAOP-NMT, in a preclinical study.

==== Others ====
NDTDI chemical structure.

Other simplified non-rigid LSD analogues, like CT-5252 and NDTDI among others, have additionally been synthesized and assayed. NDTDI is a tricyclic analogue of LSD and N-DEAOP-NMT in which only the carbon atom at position 9 of the ergoline ring system has been removed, as opposed to removal of both carbons at positions 9 and 10 as in the case of N-DEAOP-NMT. It has been encountered as an LSD-related designer drug and made illegal in parts of Europe.

== History ==
N-DEAOP-NMT was first described in the scientific literature by 1952. This followed the synthesis of LSD by chemist Albert Hofmann in 1938 and the discovery of LSD's psychedelic effects by Hofmann in 1943. N-DEAOP-NMT and other simplified non-rigid LSD analogues were notably reviewed and discussed by psychedelic chemist David E. Nichols in his Ph.D. thesis on LSD analogues and other psychedelics in 1973. N-DEAOP-NMT's derivatives N-DEAOP-NET and 5-MeO-N-DEAOP-NET, as well as LSD-like effects of these compounds, were first described in the literature by 1971, while 5-MeO-N-DEAOP-NMT and its serotonin receptor interactions were first described by 2005.

== See also ==
- Substituted tryptamine
- Partial lysergamide
- List of miscellaneous 5-HT_{2A} receptor agonists
