= 8-OH-DPAT =

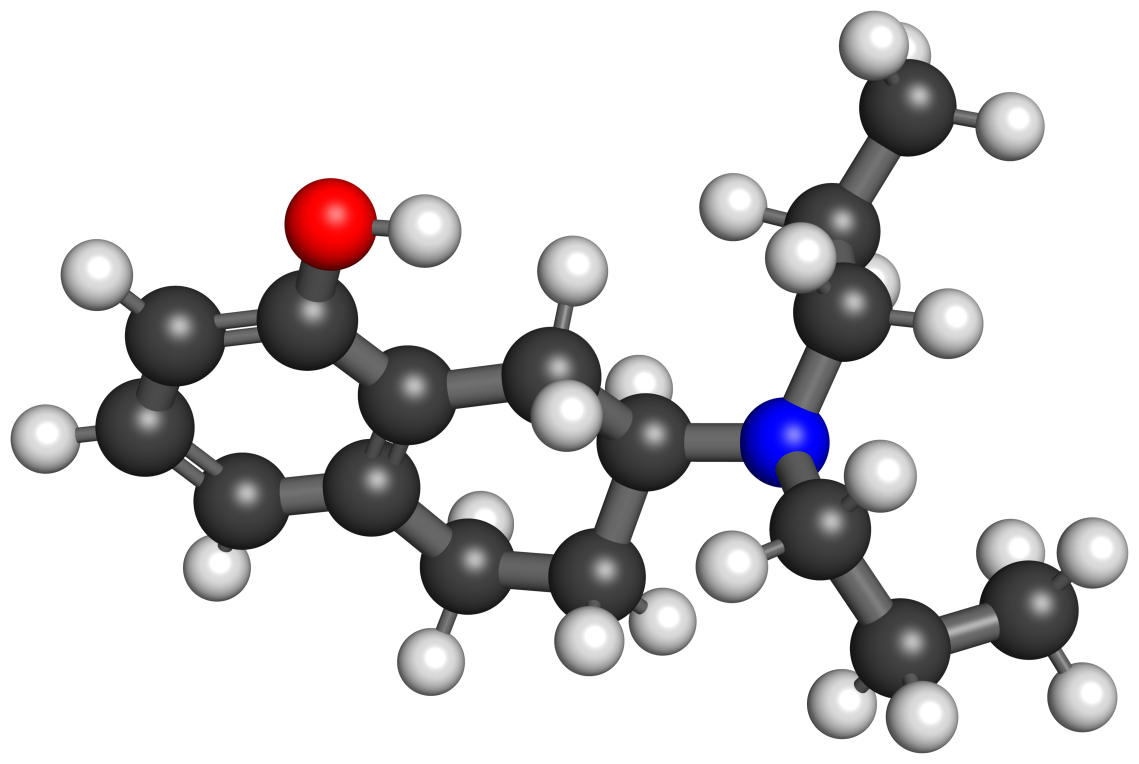

Clinical data
- Other names: 8-Hydroxy-2-(dipropylamino)tetralin; 8-Hydroxy-2-(di-n-propylamino)tetralin
- Drug class: Serotonin 5-HT_{1A} receptor agonist; Serotonin 5-HT_{7} receptor agonist; Serotonin reuptake inhibitor or releasing agent
- ATC code: None

Identifiers
- IUPAC name: 7-(dipropylamino)-5,6,7,8-tetrahydronaphthalen-1-ol
- CAS Number: 78950-78-4
- PubChem CID: 1220
- IUPHAR/BPS: 7
- ChemSpider: 1183
- UNII: IWS1724PX6
- ChEBI: CHEBI:73364
- ChEMBL: ChEMBL56
- CompTox Dashboard (EPA): DTXSID30897384

Chemical and physical data
- Formula: C_{16}H_{25}NO
- Molar mass: 247.382 g·mol^{−1}
- 3D model (JSmol): Interactive image
- SMILES: CCCN(CCC)C1CCc2cccc(O)c2C1
- InChI: InChI=1S/C16H25NO/c1-3-10-17(11-4-2)14-9-8-13-6-5-7-16(18)15(13)12-14/h5-7,14,18H,3-4,8-12H2,1-2H3; Key:ASXGJMSKWNBENU-UHFFFAOYSA-N

8-OH-DPAT, also known as 8-hydroxy-2-(dipropylamino)tetralin, is a serotonin 5-HT_{1A} receptor agonist of the 2-aminotetralin family which was developed in the 1980s and has been widely used to study the function of the 5-HT_{1A} receptor. It was one of the first major 5-HT_{1A} receptor full agonists to have been discovered.

Originally believed to be selective for the 5-HT_{1A} receptor, 8-OH-DPAT was later found to act as a serotonin 5-HT_{7} receptor agonist and serotonin reuptake inhibitor or releasing agent as well.

In animal studies, 8-OH-DPAT has been shown to possess antidepressant, anxiolytic, prosocial, serenic (antiaggressive), prosexual, anorectic, antiemetic, hypothermic, hypotensive, bradycardic, hyperventilative, and analgesic effects.

8-OH-DPAT dose-dependently increases oxytocin levels in rodents. It can also strongly increase oxytocin gene expression in monkeys. Continuous administration of the selective serotonin reuptake inhibitor (SSRI) fluoxetine or serotonin transporter (SERT) knockout can blunt the increased oxytocin levels with 8-OH-DPAT in rodents via desensitization of postsynaptic serotonin 5-HT_{1A} receptors. The increase in oxytocin levels with 8-OH-DPAT is mediated by activation of the G_{z} pathway of the serotonin 5-HT_{1A} receptor. The prosocial effects of 8-OH-DPAT in rodents can be blocked by oxytocin receptor antagonists tocinoic acid and L-368,899. In addition, the prosexual effects of 8-OH-DPAT in rodents can be moderately antagonized by the oxytocin receptor antagonist OXTR-A. Conversely, the oxytocin receptor antagonist L-368,899 had no effect on the antiaggressive effects of 8-OH-DPAT.

== See also ==
- Substituted 2-aminotetralin
- 5-OH-DPAT
- 5-MeO-DPAC
- 7-OH-DPAT
- Bay R 1531
- MDAT
- RDS-127
- UH-301
