= Ring (chemistry) =

Closed-loop molecular structure

Four cycloalkanes, all of which exhibit simple rings

In chemistry, a ring is an ambiguous term referring either to a simple cycle of atoms and bonds in a molecule or to a connected set of atoms and bonds in which every atom and bond is a member of a cycle (also called a ring system). A ring system that is a simple cycle is called a monocycle or simple ring, and one that is not a simple cycle is called a polycycle or polycyclic ring system. A simple ring contains the same number of sigma bonds as atoms, and a polycyclic ring system contains more sigma bonds than atoms.

A molecule containing one or more rings is called a cyclic compound, and a molecule containing two or more rings (either in the same or different ring systems) is termed a polycyclic compound. A molecule containing no rings is called an acyclic or open-chain compound.

== Homocyclic and heterocyclic rings ==
A homocycle or homocyclic ring is a ring in which all atoms are of the same chemical element. A heterocycle or heterocyclic ring is a ring containing atoms of at least two different elements, i.e. a non-homocyclic ring. A carbocycle or carbocyclic ring is a homocyclic ring in which all of the atoms are carbon. An important class of carbocycles are alicyclic rings, and an important subclass of these are cycloalkanes.

== Rings and ring systems ==
In common usage the terms "ring" and "ring system" are frequently interchanged, with the appropriate definition depending upon context. Typically a "ring" denotes a simple ring, unless otherwise qualified, as in terms like "polycyclic ring", "fused ring", "spiro ring" and "indole ring", where clearly a polycyclic ring system is intended. Likewise, a "ring system" typically denotes a polycyclic ring system, except in terms like "monocyclic ring system" or "pyridine ring system". To reduce ambiguity, IUPAC's recommendations on organic nomenclature avoid the use of the term "ring" by using phrases such as "monocyclic parent" and "polycyclic ring system".

== See also ==
- Cyclic compound
- Polycyclic compound
- Heterocyclic compound
- Bicyclic molecule
- Spiro compound
