= Dimethyltryptamine =

Psychedelic drug

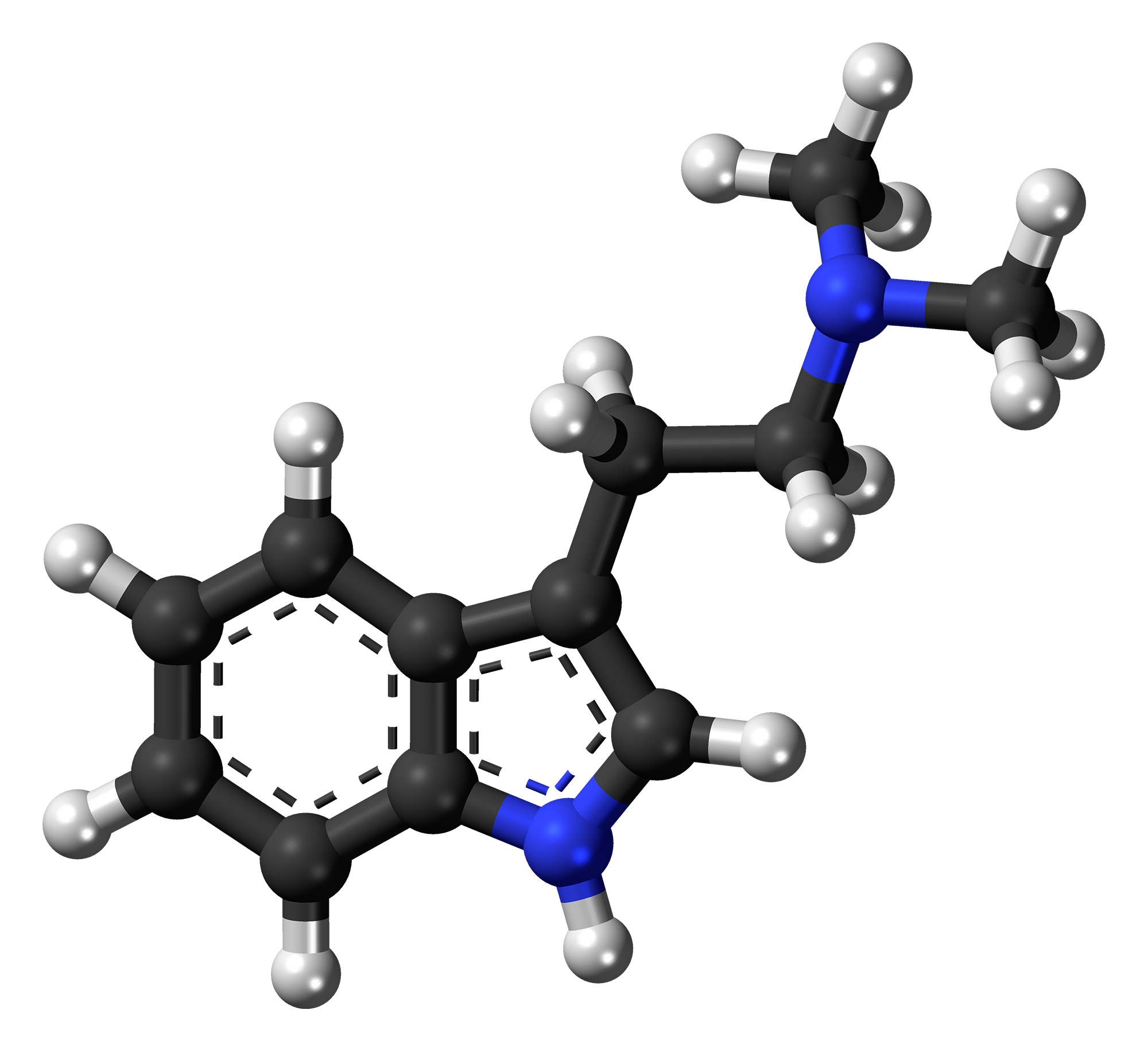

Clinical data
- Other names: DMT; N,N-dimethyltryptamine; N,N-DMT; Desoxybufotenine; Desoxybufotenin; Nigerine; Dimitri; DiMiTri; "The Spirit Molecule"
- Dependence liability: None or very low
- Addiction liability: None or very low
- Routes of administration: Oral (with MAOI), inhalation (smoking or vaping), intramuscular, subcutaneous, intravenous (bolus or infusion)
- Drug class: Serotonin receptor agonist; Serotonin 5-HT_{2A} receptor agonist; Serotonergic psychedelic; Hallucinogen
- ATC code: None

Physiological data
- Source tissues: Central nervous system (exact source tissues are not fully established)
- Target tissues: Central nervous system
- Receptors: At least 13 receptors (e.g., serotonin, sigma, trace amine)
- Precursor: Tryptophan
- Metabolism: Oxidative deamination (MAO-A), N-oxidation, N-demethylation, peroxidation

Legal status
- Legal status: AU: S9 (Prohibited substance); BR: Class F2 (Prohibited psychotropics); CA: Schedule III; DE: Anlage I (Authorized scientific use only); UK: Class A; US: Schedule I; UN: Psychotropic Schedule I; EU: Illegal; SE: Illegal

Pharmacokinetic data
- Bioavailability: Very low and inactive (except with MAOI)
- Protein binding: 30%
- Metabolism: Oxidative deamination (MAO-A), N-oxidation, N-demethylation, peroxidation
- Metabolites: Indole-3-acetic acid (IAA, 3-IAA) (63–97%); DMT-N-oxide (DMT-NO) (3–28%); N-Methyltryptamine (NMT); Tryptamine; Others
- Onset of action: Inhalation: 10–15 seconds; Intravenous: ≤2–5 min; Intramuscular: 2–5 min; Oral with MAOI: ≤1 hour
- Elimination half-life: Alone: 5–19 min; With MAOI: 1–4 hours
- Duration of action: Inhalation: ≤15 min; Intravenous: ≤30 min; Intramuscular: 30–60 min; Oral with MAOI: 4–6 hours
- Excretion: Urine

Identifiers
- IUPAC name: 2-(1H-indol-3-yl)-N,N-dimethylethanamine
- CAS Number: 61-50-7
- PubChem CID: 6089
- IUPHAR/BPS: 141
- DrugBank: DB01488
- ChemSpider: 5864
- UNII: WUB601BHAA
- KEGG: C08302
- ChEBI: CHEBI:28969
- ChEMBL: ChEMBL12420
- PDB ligand: A1AFV (PDBe, RCSB PDB)
- CompTox Dashboard (EPA): DTXSID60110053
- ECHA InfoCard: 100.000.463

Chemical and physical data
- Formula: C_{12}H_{16}N_{2}
- Molar mass: 188.274 g·mol^{−1}
- 3D model (JSmol): Interactive image
- Density: 1.099 g/cm^{3}
- Melting point: 40 °C (104 °F)
- Boiling point: 160 °C (320 °F) at 0.6 Torr (80 Pa) also reported as 80–135 °C (176–275 °F) at 0.03 Torr (4.0 Pa)
- SMILES: CN(CCC1=CNC2=C1C=CC=C2)C
- InChI: InChI=1S/C12H16N2/c1-14(2)8-7-10-9-13-12-6-4-3-5-11(10)12/h3-6,9,13H,7-8H2,1-2H3; Key:DMULVCHRPCFFGV-UHFFFAOYSA-N

Dimethyltryptamine (DMT), also known as N,N-dimethyltryptamine (N,N-DMT), is a serotonergic hallucinogen and investigational drug of the tryptamine family that occurs naturally in many plants and animals. DMT is used as a psychedelic drug and prepared by various cultures for ritual purposes as an entheogen.

DMT has a rapid onset, intense effects, and a relatively short duration of action. For those reasons, DMT was known as the "businessman's trip" during the 1960s in the United States, as a user could access the full depth of a psychedelic experience in considerably less time than with other substances such as LSD or psilocybin mushrooms. DMT can be inhaled or injected and its effects depend on the dose as well as the mode of administration. When inhaled or injected, the effects last about five to fifteen minutes. Effects can last three hours or more when orally ingested along with a monoamine oxidase inhibitor (MAOI), such as the ayahuasca brew of many native Amazonian tribes. DMT induces intense, often indescribable subjective experiences involving vivid visual hallucinations, altered sensory perception, ego dissolution, and encounters with seemingly autonomous entities. DMT is generally considered non-addictive with low dependence and having little to no tolerance build-up with short-acting routes, but it may cause acute psychological distress or cardiovascular effects, especially in predisposed individuals.

DMT was first synthesized in 1931. It is a functional and structural analog of other psychedelic tryptamines such as 4-AcO-DMT (O-acetylpsilocin), psilocybin (4-PO-DMT), psilocin (4-HO-DMT), O-methylbufotenin (5-MeO-DMT), and bufotenin (5-HO-DMT). Parts of the structure of DMT occur within some important biomolecules like serotonin and melatonin, making them structural analogues of DMT.

DMT exhibits broad and variable binding affinities across numerous receptors, showing its strongest interactions with serotonin receptors, especially 5-HT_{2A}, 5-HT_{1A}, and 5-HT_{2C}, which are believed to mediate its psychedelic effects. Endogenous DMT, a psychedelic compound, is naturally produced in mammals, with evidence showing its synthesis and presence in brain and body tissues, though its exact roles and origins remain debated. DMT is internationally illegal without authorization, with most countries banning its possession and trade, though some allow religious use of ayahuasca, a DMT-containing decoction. Short-acting psychedelics like DMT are considered scalable alternatives to longer-acting drugs like psilocybin for potential clinical use. DMT is currently undergoing clinical trials for treatment-resistant depression.

== Use and effects ==
=== Forms, routes, and doses ===
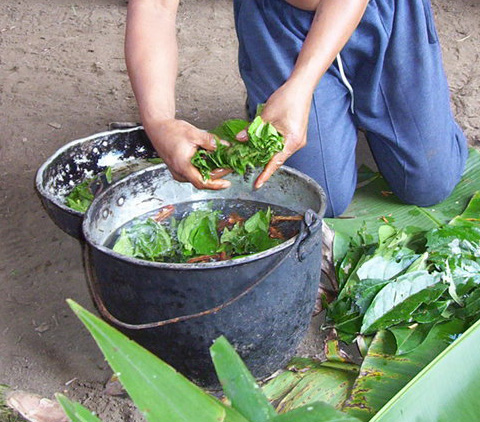
Ayahuasca preparation

DMT is used either in pure form or in the form of naturally sourced materials. It occurs naturally in many plants, the more notable species including Psychotria viridis, Mimosa tenuiflora, and Diplopterys cabrerana. The drug is often present alongside its close analogues 5-MeO-DMT (mebufotenin) and bufotenin (5-HO-DMT). It has widely been used as an entheogen or for shamanistic purposes in Central and South America, for instance among Amazonian peoples. This includes as the traditional beverage ayahuasca and other forms. Ayahuasca is a boiled mixture of different plants, including a DMT-containing plant like Psychotria viridis, Psychotria carthagenensis, or Diplopterys cabrerana together with another plant, Banisteriopsis caapi. A variety of different recipes may be used to make the brew. DMT is usually the main active constituent of ayahuasca, but ayahuasca is sometimes also brewed with plants that do not contain DMT. The drug is also found as a minor alkaloid in hallucinogenic snuffs such as those made from Virola or Anadenanthera plant materials but in which the major active drugs are instead 5-MeO-DMT and/or bufotenin. In addition to its use as an entheogen, DMT is used recreationally.

DMT is not orally active on its own and is given by parenteral administration, such as smoking, intramuscular injection, subcutaneous injection, or intravenous injection. Other routes like intranasal, buccal, or rectal administration have also been tried but were all reported to be inactive. The lack of oral activity of DMT is due to rapid metabolism by the enzyme monoamine oxidase A (MAO-A). However, when taken in combination with an irreversible monoamine oxidase inhibitor (MAOI) or a reversible inhibitor of MAO-A (RIMA) such as a harmala alkaloid like harmine or harmaline or a pharmaceutical RIMA like moclobemide, DMT becomes orally active with an extended duration relative to parenteral use of DMT alone. Certain plants like Peganum harmala and the Banisteriopsis caapi used in ayahuasca contain harmala alkaloids which allow DMT to become orally active. When oral DMT is used with an MAOI and the materials are not naturally sourced, the combination is known as pharmahuasca. Changa is a plant-derived form of DMT that is smoked. Smoking and intravenous injection of DMT have extremely intense but very-short-lived effects, whereas intramuscular injection and particularly oral administration with an MAOI have less intense but longer-lasting effects.

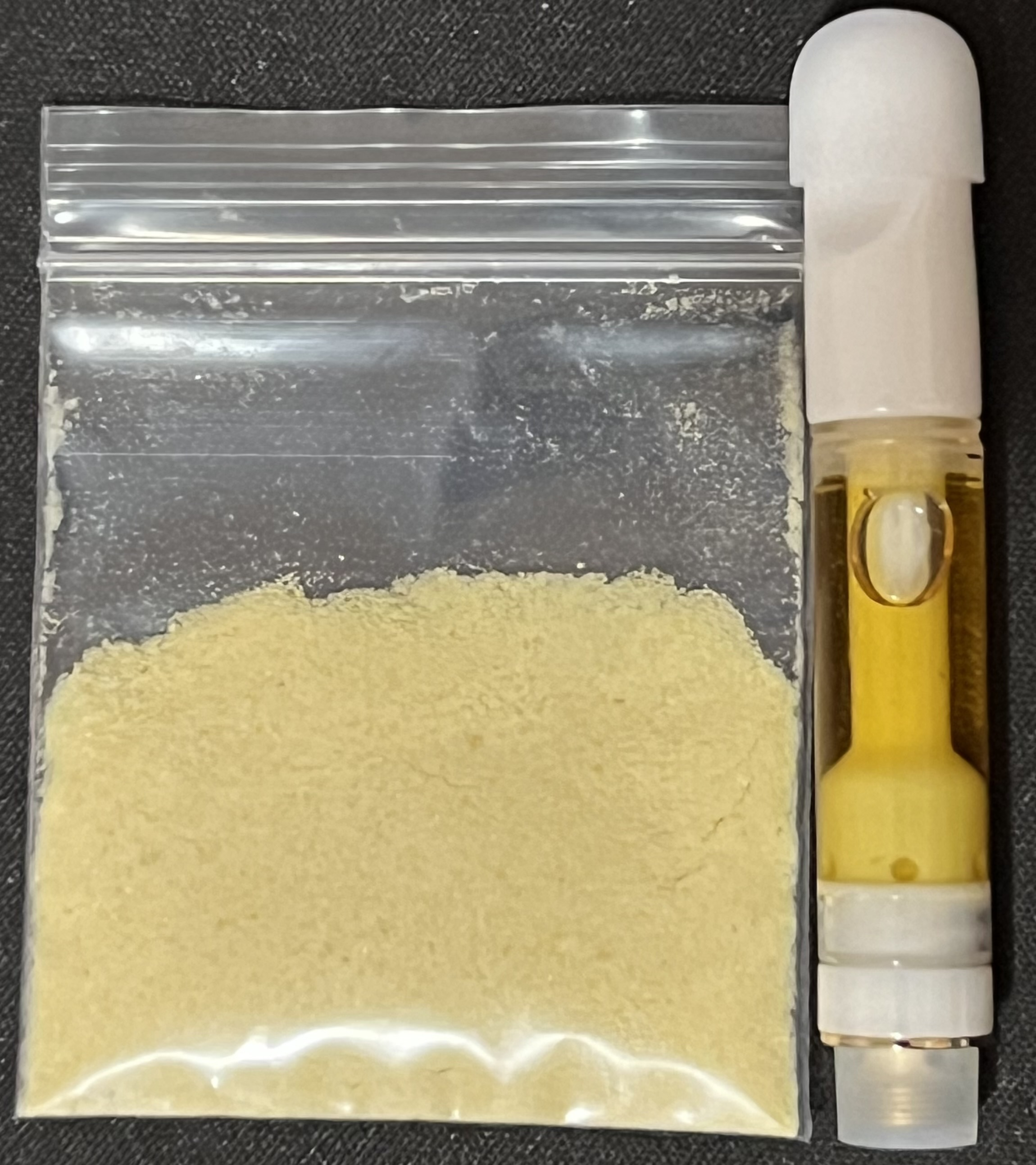
Free-base DMT powder extracted from Mimosa hostilis root bark (left); vape cartridge made with free-base DMT extract (right)

In his book TiHKAL (Tryptamines I Have Known and Loved) and other publications, Alexander Shulgin lists DMT's dose as greater than 350 mg orally, 60 to 100 mg intramuscularly, subcutaneously, or via smoking, and 4 to 30 mg by intravenous injection. He also reported that doses of 150 to 350 mg or even up to 1,000 mg orally and a dose of 100 mg buccally produced no effects, whereas doses of 20 to 80 mg intramuscularly, 30 to 100 mg smoked, and 15 to 30 mg intravenously were all active in producing effects. In terms of intramuscular injection, threshold effects occur at a dose of 30 mg and full effects occur at a dose of 50 to 100 mg by this route. Similarly, the dose for full effects with subcutaneous injection is likewise 60 to 100 mg. With regard to intravenous injection, a dose of 4 mg was indistinguishable from placebo, 8 mg produced physical effects but no psychoactive effects, 15 mg produced threshold psychedelic effects, and 30 mg produced strong psychedelic effects. Shulgin lists the duration of parenteral DMT alone as up to 1 hour.

In other more recent publications, different dose ranges of inhaled DMT of 2 to 100 mg or 15 to 60 mg have been described and typical doses have been reported to be 40 to 50 mg. Concerning intravenous injection and based on contemporary clinical studies, 15 mg has been described as a low dose, 25 mg as an intermediate or "good effect" dose, and 30 mg as a high, or "ego-dissolution", dose. There may be a ceiling in the intensity of DMT's effects, however, with saturation reached at doses of 15 to 20 mg. For intramuscular injection, a range of 50 to 100 mg with an estimated typical dose of 75 mg has been noted. The onset of DMT has been given as 10 to 15 seconds smoked, two to five minutes intravenously, and two to five minutes intramuscularly. In addition, its duration is given as five to twenty minutes (average 12 minutes) via inhalation, less than 30 minutes intravenously, and 30 to 60 minutes intramuscularly.

DMT by continuous intravenous infusion (i.e., an intravenous "drip", also sometimes known as "DMTx") has additionally been developed recently and can extend the duration of intravenous DMT to hours. The dose range for this route is 0.6 to 1.8 mg per minute, with 0.6 mg/minute being a low dose, 1.2 mg/minute being an intermediate or "good effect" dose, and 1.8 to 2.4 mg/minute being a high, or "ego-dissolution", dose. In addition to continuous intravenous infusion, DMT vape pens have been developed and distributed as an alternative to smoking.

Besides parenteral DMT alone, Shulgin also described the properties of oral DMT in combination with the MAOI and distinct ibogaine-like hallucinogen harmaline or in some cases Peganum harmala seeds in TiHKAL. This combination is a form of pharmahuasca and is similar to ayahuasca. Doses of 20 to 50 mg harmaline with 55 to 60 mg DMT both orally were associated with little to no effect. At higher harmaline doses, including 80 to 150 mg, combined with 35 to 120 mg DMT, both orally, clear MAOI activity occurred and more significant effects became apparent. More recent publications have defined the usually recommended doses as 50 mg DMT and 100 mg harmaline orally. Besides DMT with harmaline, the properties and effects of oral DMT in combination with harmine have also been studied by Jonathan Ott. He found that the threshold dose was 20 or 30 mg DMT and 120 mg harmine orally. Shulgin also reported in TiHKAL that 35 to 40 mg DMT and 140 to 190 mg harmine were unmistakably active, whereas smaller doses of 30 mg DMT and 120 to 140 mg harmine orally were inactive. In notable contrast to harmaline, harmine does not have its own psychoactive effects when used at doses of up to at least 300 mg orally. In pharmahuasca, the harmala alkaloid is usually taken first and then DMT is taken 15 to 20 minutes later, although a shorter or longer interval may also be employed. The onset of oral DMT with an MAOI is within 1 hour and its duration is 4 to 6 hours.

=== Subjective effects ===
Subjective experiences of DMT indubitably includes profound time-dilatory, visual, auditory, tactile, and proprioceptive distortions and hallucinations, and other experiences that, by most firsthand accounts, defy verbal or visual description. Examples include perceiving hyperbolic geometry or seeing Escher-like impossible objects.

Several scientific experimental studies have tried to measure subjective experiences of altered states of consciousness induced by drugs under highly controlled and safe conditions.

Rick Strassman and his colleagues conducted a five-year-long DMT study at the University of New Mexico in the 1990s. The results provided insight about the quality of subjective psychedelic experiences. In this study participants received the DMT dose via intravenous injection and the findings suggested that different psychedelic experiences can occur, depending on the dose. Lower doses (0.01 and 0.05 mg/kg) produced some aesthetic and emotional responses, but not hallucinogenic experiences (e.g., 0.05 mg/kg had mild mood elevating and calming properties). In contrast, responses produced by higher doses (0.2 and 0.4 mg/kg) researchers labeled as "hallucinogenic" that elicited "intensely colored, rapidly moving display of visual images, formed, abstract or both". Comparing to other sensory modalities, the most affected was the visual. Participants reported visual hallucinations, fewer auditory hallucinations and specific physical sensations progressing to a sense of bodily dissociation, as well as experiences of euphoria, calm, fear, and anxiety. These dose-dependent effects match well with anonymously posted "trip reports" online, where users report "breakthroughs" above certain doses.

Strassman also highlighted the importance of the context where the drug has been taken. He claimed that DMT has no beneficial effects of itself, rather the context when and where people take it plays an important role.

It appears that DMT can induce a state or feeling wherein the person believes they "communicate with other intelligent lifeforms" (see "Entity encounters" below). High doses of DMT produce a state that involves a sense of "another intelligence" that people sometimes describe as "super-intelligent", but "emotionally detached".

A 1995 study by Adolf Dittrich and Daniel Lamparter found that the DMT-induced altered state of consciousness (ASC) is strongly influenced by habitual rather than situative factors. In the study, researchers used three dimensions of the APZ questionnaire to examine ASC. The first dimension, oceanic boundlessness (OB), refers to dissolution of ego boundaries and is mostly associated with positive emotions. The second dimension, anxious ego-dissolution, represents a disordering of thoughts and decreases in autonomy and self-control. Last, visionary restructuralization (VR) refers to auditory/visual illusions and hallucinations. Results showed strong effects within the first and third dimensions for all conditions, especially with DMT, and suggested strong intrastability of elicited reactions independently of the condition for the OB and VR scales.

The effects of parenterally administered DMT have been described by Alexander Shulgin in his book TiHKAL (Tryptamines I Have Known and Loved). The perceptual effects included feeling strange, closed-eye imagery such as beautiful colored kaleidoscopic images, fast-moving geometric patterns, and complex and wonderful scenes alternating very rapidly, open-eye psychedelic visuals such as moving patterns, patterns becoming heads of animals, and people's faces seeming to be masks, perceptual disturbances and distortions, yellowing of visual field, and rare auditory changes. Other effects included feeling intoxicated or stoned, everything feeling blurry, feeling a rush, time dilation, loss of spatial perception, ego dissolution, feeling as if one has died or no longer exists, feeling like one has no body, feeling that one is moving at the speed of light, feeling like one is gazing upon the entire universe, and encounters with strange entities or creatures. Emotional effects included emotional changes, euphoria, imagery being associated with deep emotional content and connotation, feeling overwhelmed, anxiety and fear, feeling like one cannot breathe, a sense of dread and doom, and wanting one's mother. Physical side effects included pupil dilation, tingling, trembling, numbness, sweating, lightheadedness, athetosis, slight nausea, and increased heart rate and blood pressure.

In addition to parenteral DMT, Shulgin described the effects of oral DMT plus harmaline or in some cases Peganum harmala seeds in TiHKAL. The effects were reported to include closed-eye imagery such as colors, infinitely repeated and wavy sheets of patterns, and kaleidoscopic images, visual changes like brighter colors and patterns and distortions, music enhancement, time distortion, clarity, insights, intoxication, emotional changes, feeling alive and excited, depression, despair, and feeling psychotic. Other effects included difficulty focusing on thoughts, short-term memory disruption, feeling cold, nausea, gait impairment or difficulty walking, and an afterglow. The preceding effects are variably due to both DMT and harmaline, with harmaline also producing its own hallucinogenic effects at sufficiently doses, for instance 150 mg or more.

==== Entity encounters ====
Entities perceived while under the effects of DMT have been represented in diverse forms of psychedelic art. The term machine elf was coined by ethnobotanist Terence McKenna for the entities he encountered in DMT "hyperspace", along with terms like fractal elves, or self-transforming machine elves. McKenna first encountered the "machine elves" after smoking DMT in Berkeley in 1965. His subsequent speculations regarding the hyperdimensional space in which they were encountered have inspired a great many artists and musicians, and the meaning of DMT entities has been a subject of considerable debate among participants in a networked cultural underground, enthused by McKenna's effusive accounts of DMT hyperspace. Cliff Pickover has also written about the "machine elf" experience, in the book Sex, Drugs, Einstein, & Elves. Strassman noted similarities between self-reports of his DMT study participants' encounters with these "entities", and mythological descriptions of figures such as Ḥayyot haq-Qodesh in ancient religions, including both angels and demons. Strassman also argues for a similarity in his study participants' descriptions of mechanized wheels, gears and machinery in these encounters, with those described in visions of encounters with the Living Creatures and Ophanim of the Hebrew Bible, noting they may stem from a common neuropsychopharmacological experience.

Strassman argues that the more positive of the "external entities" encountered in DMT experiences should be understood as analogous to certain forms of angels:

The medieval Jewish philosophers whom I rely upon for understanding the Hebrew Bible text and its concept of prophecy portray angels as God's intermediaries. That is, they perform a certain function for God. Within the context of my DMT research, I believe that the beings that volunteers see could be conceived of as angelic – that is, previously invisible, incorporeal spiritual forces that are engarbed or enclothed in a particular form – determined by the psychological and spiritual development of the volunteers – bringing a particular message or experience to that volunteer.

Strassman's experimental participants also note that some other entities can subjectively resemble creatures more like insects and aliens. As a result, Strassman writes these experiences among his experimental participants "also left me feeling confused and concerned about where the spirit molecule was leading us. It was at this point that I began to wonder if I was getting in over my head with this research."

Hallucinations of strange creatures had been reported by Stephen Szára in a 1958 study in psychotic patients, in which he described how one of his subjects under the influence of DMT had experienced "strange creatures, dwarves or something" at the beginning of a DMT trip.

Other researchers of the entities seemingly encountered by DMT users describe them as "entities" or "beings" in humanoid as well as animal form, with descriptions of "little people" being common (non-human gnomes, elves, imps, etc.). Strassman and others have speculated that this form of hallucination may be the cause of alien abduction and extraterrestrial encounter experiences, which may occur through endogenously-occurring DMT.

Likening them to descriptions of rattling and chattering auditory phenomena described in encounters with the Hayyoth in the Book of Ezekiel, Rick Strassman notes that participants in his studies, when reporting encounters with the alleged entities, have also described loud auditory hallucinations, such as one subject reporting typically "the elves laughing or talking at high volume, chattering, twittering".

Researchers such as Robin Carhart-Harris and David E. Nichols among others believe that DMT entities are merely illusions and hallucinations. However, Andrew Gallimore believes that entity encounters are real and genuine interactions with other-dimensional beings.

Neurocomputational models of entity encounters have been proposed, for instance by Carhart-Harris and colleagues.

==== Near-death experiences ====
A 2018 study found significant relationships between DMT experiences and near-death experiences (NDE). A 2019 large-scale study pointed that ketamine, Salvia divinorum, and DMT (and other classical psychedelic substances) may be linked to NDEs due to the semantic similarity of reports associated with the use of psychoactive compounds and NDE narratives, but the study concluded that with the current data it is neither possible to corroborate nor refute the hypothesis that the release of an endogenous ketamine-like neuroprotective agent underlies NDE phenomenology.

=== Physiological effects ===
According to a dose-response study in human subjects, dimethyltryptamine administered intravenously slightly elevated blood pressure, heart rate, pupil diameter, and rectal temperature, in addition to elevating blood concentrations of beta-endorphin, corticotropin, cortisol, and prolactin; growth hormone blood levels rose equally in response to all doses of DMT, and melatonin levels were unaffected."

=== Endogenous production and effects ===
In the 1950s, the endogenous production of psychoactive agents was considered to be a potential explanation for the hallucinatory symptoms of some psychiatric diseases; this is known as the transmethylation hypothesis. Several speculative and yet untested hypotheses suggest that endogenous DMT is produced in the human brain and is involved in certain psychological and neurological states. DMT is naturally occurring in small amounts in rat brains, human cerebrospinal fluid, and other tissues of humans and other mammals. Further, mRNA for the enzyme necessary for the production of DMT, INMT, are expressed in the human cerebral cortex, choroid plexus, and pineal gland, suggesting an endogenous role in the human brain. In 2011, Nicholas Cozzi of the University of Wisconsin School of Medicine and Public Health, and three other researchers, concluded that INMT, an enzyme that is associated with the biosynthesis of DMT and endogenous hallucinogens is present in the non-human primate (rhesus macaque) pineal gland, retinal ganglion neurons, and spinal cord. Neurobiologist Andrew Gallimore suggested in 2013 that while DMT might not have a modern neural function, it may have been an ancestral neuromodulator once secreted in psychedelic concentrations during rapid eye movement sleep, a function now lost.

== Adverse effects ==
=== Psychiatric adverse effects ===
DMT may trigger psychological reactions, known colloquially as a "bad trip", such as intense fear, paranoia, anxiety, and panic-attacks.

==== Hallucinogen-induced psychotic disorder ====
DMT can rarely cause hallucinogen-induced psychotic disorder. HIPD is a type of substance-induced psychosis. The symptoms of HIPD are psychosis with paranoia, delusions, hallucinations, disorganized thinking, or insomnia that persist beyond the initial effects of the drug. HIPD due to psychedelics is most commonly associated with LSD, but may be caused by DMT as well. Hallucinogen-induced psychotic disorder is a medical emergency. Without treatment, the psychosis can persist for weeks or months. The treatment is an atypical antipsychotic medication such as aripiprazole, quetiapine, olanzapine, or risperidone. People with a personal or family history of mental illness are at the highest risk for hallucinogen-induced psychotic disorder. The condition occurs in fewer than 1% of people with psychedelics.

=== Addiction and dependence liability ===
DMT, like other serotonergic psychedelics, is considered to be non-addictive with low abuse potential. A study examining substance use disorder for the DSM-IV reported that almost no hallucinogens produced dependence, unlike psychoactive drugs of other classes such as stimulants and depressants. At present, there have been no studies that report drug withdrawal syndrome with termination of DMT, and dependence potential of DMT and the risk of sustained psychological disturbance may be minimal when used infrequently; however, the physiological dependence potential of DMT and ayahuasca has not yet been documented convincingly.

=== Tolerance ===
Unlike with other classical psychedelics, tolerance does not seem to develop to the subjective effects of DMT. Studies report that DMT did not exhibit tolerance upon repeated administration of twice a day sessions, separated by five hours, for five consecutive days; field reports suggests a refractory period of only 15 to 30 minutes, while the plasma levels of DMT were nearly undetectable 30 minutes after intravenous administration. Another study of four closely spaced DMT infusion sessions with 30 minute intervals also suggests no tolerance buildup to the psychological effects of the compound, while heart rate responses and neuroendocrine effects were diminished with repeated administration. Similarly to DMT by itself, tolerance does not appear to develop to ayahuasca. A fully hallucinogenic dose of DMT did not demonstrate cross-tolerance to human subjects who are highly tolerant to LSD; hence, research suggests that DMT exhibits unique pharmacological properties compared to other classical psychedelics. Contrary to earlier findings, however, subsequent clinical studies employing DMT by continuous intravenous infusion (also known as DMTx) have found rapid and moderate acute tolerance development with DMT.

=== Long-term use ===
There have been no serious adverse effects reported on long-term use of DMT, apart from acute cardiovascular events. Repeated and one-time administration of DMT produces marked changes in the cardiovascular system, with an increase in systolic and diastolic blood pressure; although the changes were not statistically significant, a robust trend towards significance was observed for systolic blood pressure at high doses.

== Overdose ==
There have been two reported cases of death with DMT. In terms of extrapolated human lethal dose based on animal studies and human case reports, the lethal dose of DMT relative to a typical recreational dose is estimated to be 50-fold in the case of oral DMT (as ayahuasca).

== Interactions ==
DMT is inactive when ingested orally due to metabolism by monoamine oxidase (MAO), and DMT-containing drinks such as ayahuasca have been found to contain monoamine oxidase inhibitors (MAOIs), in particular, harmine and harmaline. Life-threatening lethalities such as serotonin syndrome (SS) may occur when MAOIs are combined with certain serotonergic medications such as selective serotonin reuptake inhibitor (SSRI) antidepressants. Serotonin syndrome has also been reported with tricyclic antidepressants (TCAs), certain opioids, certain analgesics, and antimigraine drugs; it is advised to exercise caution when an individual has used dextromethorphan (DXM), MDMA, ginseng, or St. John's wort recently.

Chronic use of SSRIs, TCAs, and MAOIs diminish subjective effects of psychedelics due to presumed serotonin 5-HT_{2A} receptors downregulation and/or desensitization secondary to elevated serotonin levels. However, a clinical study of people with depression found that SSRIs did not diminish the effects of DMT and instead resulted in greater mystical experience, emotional breakthrough, and ego dissolution scores with DMT than in people with depression not on antidepressants. This was in contrast to previous research finding that SSRIs diminished the effects of serotonergic psychedelics.

The interaction between psychedelics and antipsychotics and anticonvulsants are not well documented; however, reports reveal that co-use of psychedelics with mood stabilizers such as lithium may provoke seizure and dissociative effects in individuals with bipolar disorder.

The beta blocker pindolol has been found to robustly potentiate the effects of DMT. This is thought to be due to pindolol's serotonin 5-HT_{1A} receptor antagonism, which is thought to disinhibit the effects of DMT.

The serotonin receptor agonist methysergide (UML-491) has been reported to greatly intensify the effects of DMT.

== Pharmacology ==
=== Pharmacodynamics ===
Activities of DMT
Target	Affinity (K_{i}, nM)
5-HT_{1A}	75–>10,000 (K_{i}); 75–>100,000 (EC_{50}); 68–100% (E_{max})
5-HT_{1B}	129–>10,000
5-HT_{1D}	39–270
5-HT_{1E}	456–517
5-HT_{1F}	ND
5-HT_{2A}	53–2,323 (K_{i}); 22–6,325 (EC_{50}); 23–105% (E_{max})
5-HT_{2B}	101–184 (K_{i}); 3,400–>31,600 (EC_{50}); 10.4% (E_{max})
5-HT_{2C}	33–424 (K_{i}); 31–114 (EC_{50}); 85–99% (E_{max})
5-HT_{3}	>10,000
5-HT_{4}	ND
5-HT_{5A}	611–2,135
5-HT_{6}	68–487
5-HT_{7}	88–206
α_{1A}	1,300–1,745
α_{1B}	974
α_{2A}	1,561–2,100
α_{2B}	258
α_{2C}	259
β_{1}–β_{2}	>10,000
D_{1}	271–6,000
D_{2}	3,000–>10,000
D_{3}	6,300–>10,000
D_{4}	>10,000
D_{5}	>10,000
H_{1}	220
H_{2}–H_{4}	>10,000
M_{1}–M_{5}	>10,000
TAAR_{1}	2,200–3,300 (K_{i}) (rodent); 1,200–1,500 (EC_{50}) (rodent) >10,000 (EC_{50}) (human)
σ_{1}	5,209
σ_{2}	>10,000
I_{1}	650
SERT	3,742–6,000 (K_{i}); 712–3,100 (IC_{50}); 81–114 (EC_{50}); 78% (E_{max})
NET	6,500–>10,000 (K_{i}); 3,900 (IC_{50}); 4,166 (EC_{50}); ND (E_{max})
DAT	>10,000–22,000 (K_{i}); 52,000 (IC_{50}) >10,000 (EC_{50}); 5.4% (E_{max})
Notes: The smaller the value, the more avidly the drug binds to the site. Proteins human unless otherwise specified. Refs:

DMT binds non-selectively with affinities below 0.6 μmol/L to the following serotonin receptors: 5-HT_{1A}, 5-HT_{1B}, 5-HT_{1D}, 5-HT_{2A}, 5-HT_{2B}, 5-HT_{2C}, 5-HT_{6}, and 5-HT_{7}. An agonist action has been determined at 5-HT_{1A}, 5-HT_{2A} and 5-HT_{2C}. Its efficacies at other serotonin receptors remain to be determined. Of special interest will be the determination of its efficacy at human 5-HT_{2B} receptor as two in vitro assays evidenced DMT's high affinity for this receptor: 0.108 μmol/L and 0.184 μmol/L. This may be of importance because chronic or frequent uses of serotonergic drugs showing preferential high affinity and clear agonism at 5-HT_{2B} receptor have been causally linked to valvular heart disease.

It has also been shown to possess affinity for the dopamine D_{1}, α_{1}-adrenergic, α_{2}-adrenergic, imidazoline-1, and σ_{1} receptors. Converging lines of evidence established activation of the σ_{1} receptor at concentrations of 50–100 μmol/L. Its efficacies at the other receptor binding sites are unclear. It has also been shown in vitro to be a substrate for the cell-surface serotonin transporter (SERT) expressed in human platelets, and the rat vesicular monoamine transporter 2 (VMAT2), which was transiently expressed in fall armyworm Sf9 cells. DMT inhibited SERT-mediated serotonin uptake into platelets at an average concentration of 4.00 ± 0.70 μmol/L and VMAT2-mediated serotonin uptake at an average concentration of 93 ± 6.8 μmol/L. In addition, DMT is a potent serotonin releasing agent with an EC_{50} value of 81–114 nM and an E_{max} of 78%.

As with other so-called "classical hallucinogens", a large part of DMT psychedelic effects can be attributed to a functionally selective activation of the 5-HT_{2A} receptor. DMT concentrations eliciting 50% of its maximal effect (half maximal effective concentration = EC_{50}) at the human 5-HT_{2A} receptor in vitro are in the 0.118–0.983 μmol/L range. This range of values coincides well with the range of concentrations measured in blood and plasma after administration of a fully psychedelic dose.

DMT is one of the only psychedelics that is not known to produce tolerance to its hallucinogenic effects. The lack of tolerance with DMT may be related to the fact that, unlike other psychedelics such as LSD and DOI, DMT does not desensitize serotonin 5-HT_{2A} receptors in vitro. This may be due to the fact that DMT is a biased agonist of the serotonin 5-HT_{2A} receptor. More specifically, DMT activates the G_{q} signaling pathway of the serotonin 5-HT_{2A} receptor without significantly recruiting β-arrestin2. Activation of β-arrestin2 is linked to receptor downregulation and tachyphylaxis. Similarly to DMT, 5-MeO-DMT is a biased agonist of the serotonin 5-HT_{2A} receptor, with minimal β-arrestin2 recruitment, and likewise has been associated with little tolerance to its hallucinogenic effects. On the other hand, the lack of apparent tolerance of DMT and similar agents may simply be related to their very short durations. In contrast to the preceding findings, however, subsequent research has found that continuous intravenous infusion of DMT does produce moderate acute tolerance.

As DMT has been shown to have slightly better potency (EC_{50}) at the human serotonin 5-HT_{2C} receptor than at the serotonin 5-HT_{2A} receptor, the serotonin 5-HT_{2C} receptor is also implicated in DMT's effects. The drug shows pronounced biased agonism at the serotonin 5-HT_{2C} receptor. Other receptors such as the serotonin 5-HT_{1A} receptor and the sigma σ_{1} receptor may also play a role.

In 2009, it was hypothesized that DMT may be an endogenous ligand for the σ_{1} receptor. The concentration of DMT needed for σ_{1} activation in vitro (50–100 μmol/L) is similar to the behaviorally active concentration measured in mouse brain of approximately 106 μmol/L This is minimally 4 orders of magnitude higher than the average concentrations measured in rat brain tissue or human plasma under basal conditions (see Endogenous DMT), so σ_{1} receptors are likely to be activated only under conditions of high local DMT concentrations. If DMT is stored in synaptic vesicles, such concentrations might occur during vesicular release. To illustrate, while the average concentration of serotonin in brain tissue is in the 1.5-4 μmol/L range, the concentration of serotonin in synaptic vesicles was measured at 270 mM. Following vesicular release, the resulting concentration of serotonin in the synaptic cleft, to which serotonin receptors are exposed, is estimated to be about 300 μmol/L. Thus, while in vitro receptor binding affinities, efficacies, and average concentrations in tissue or plasma are useful, they are not likely to predict DMT concentrations in the vesicles or at synaptic or intracellular receptors. Under these conditions, notions of receptor selectivity are moot, and it seems probable that most of the receptors identified as targets for DMT (see above) participate in producing its psychedelic effects.

DMT produces the head-twitch response (HTR), a behavioral proxy of psychedelic-like effects, in rodents. However, its effects in the HTR paradigm in mice that are highly strain-dependent, including producing an HTR comparable to other psychedelics, producing an HTR that is much weaker than that of other psychedelics, or producing no HTR at all. These conflicting results may be due to rapid metabolism of DMT and/or other peculiarities of DMT in different species. Besides the HTR, DMT also substitutes for LSD and DOM in rodent drug discrimination tests.

DMT has been found to increase oxytocin levels in humans.

It is thought that the rate at which DMT enters the brain, and hence its route of administration, may influence its effects, with more rapid routes like intravenous administration and inhalation potentiating serotonin 5-HT_{2A} receptor activation and consequent hallucinogenic effects. As an example, a bolus intravenous injection of 15 mg DMT produces stronger peak effects than a continuous infusion of 1 mg/minute given over 1.5 hours in spite of the latter achieving higher peak DMT levels.

In September 2020, an in vitro and in vivo study found that DMT present in the ayahuasca infusion promotes neurogenesis. DMT has been found to be a psychoplastogen, a compound capable of promoting rapid and sustained neuroplasticity that may have wide-ranging therapeutic benefit.

The cryo-EM structures of the serotonin 5-HT_{2A} receptor with DMT, as well as with various other psychedelics and serotonin 5-HT_{2A} receptor agonists, have been solved and published by Bryan L. Roth and colleagues.

=== Pharmacokinetics ===
==== Absorption ====
When taken orally, DMT is metabolized by monoamine oxidase (MAO) enzymes in the liver and gut, and is thus not orally bioavailable unless a monoamine oxidase inhibitor (MAOI) is taken (as is naturally found in the ayahuasca brew). As such, DMT by itself is instead taken by parenteral administration.

Closely coextending with peak psychedelic effects, the mean time to reach peak concentration (T_{max}) has been determined to be 10 to 15 minutes in whole blood after intramuscular injection, and 2 to 3 minutes after intravenous administration. When taken orally mixed in an ayahuasca decoction or in freeze-dried ayahuasca gel caps, DMT T_{max} is considerably delayed to 1.8 hours on average, and 1.5 to 2 hours, respectively.

DMT peak level concentrations (C_{max}) measured in the blood after intramuscular (IM) injection (0.7 mg/kg, n = 11) and in plasma following intravenous administration (0.4 mg/kg, n = 10) of fully psychedelic doses are in the range of around 14 to 154 μg/L and 32 to 204 μg/L, respectively. The corresponding molar concentrations of DMT are therefore in the range of 0.074–0.818 μmol/L in whole blood and 0.170–1.08 μmol in plasma.

==== Distribution ====
DMT easily crosses the blood–brain barrier. Studies on the llipophilicity of DMT have been contradictory – most studies find DMT to be either lipophilic or slightly lipophilic, but a 2023 study found it to be lipophobic.

Several studies have described active transport and accumulation of DMT into rat and dog brains following peripheral administration. Similar active transport and accumulation processes likely occur in human brains and may concentrate DMT in brain by several-fold or more (relatively to blood), resulting in local concentrations in the micromolar or higher range. Such concentrations would be commensurate with serotonin brain tissue concentrations, which have been consistently determined to be in the 1.5–4 μmol/L range.

The plasma protein binding of DMT is low at approximately 30%.

==== Metabolism ====
DMT is primarily metabolized by monoamine oxidase A (MAO-A) (>90%) into indole-3-acetic acid (IAA) and to a much lesser extent in the liver by CYP2D6 and CYP2C19. When taken intravenously, DMT is primarily metabolized by MAO-A in the circulatory system and brain. When smoked, a more substantial fraction (possibly as high as 10–20%) is metabolized in the liver by CYP2D6 and CYP2C19.

==== Elimination ====
DMT is eliminated in urine. When DMT is used in combination with a monoamine oxidase inhibitor (MAOI), its metabolism shifts and a greater amount of DMT-N-oxide is excreted relative to deaminated metabolites. The elimination half-life after intravenous injection is 6 to 12 minutes. However, DMT has a biphasic elimination half-life, with the first phase having a half-life of 6 minutes and the second phase having a half-life of 16 minutes.

== Chemistry ==
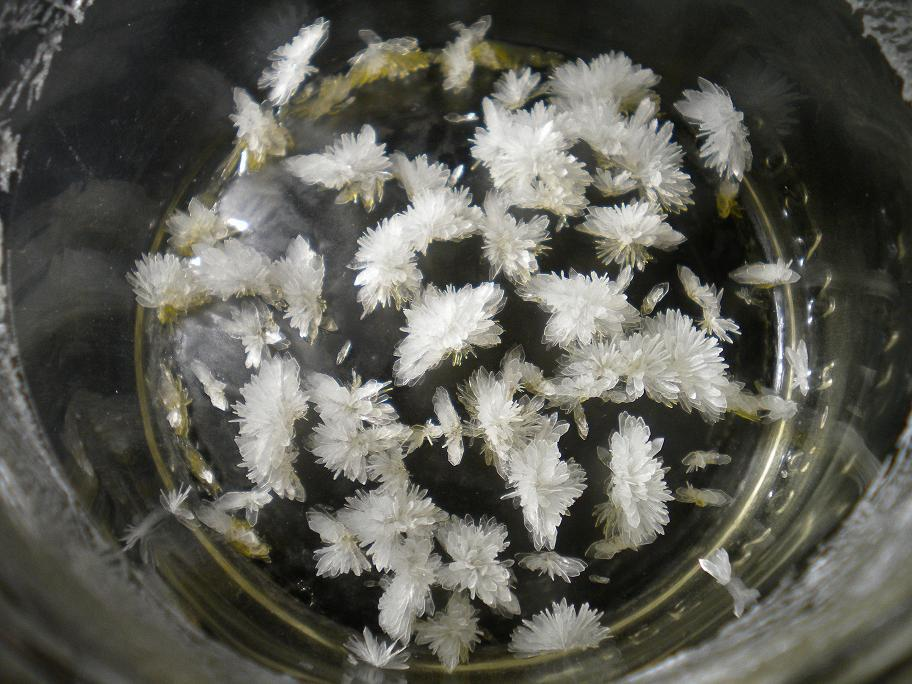
DMT crystals

=== Appearance and form ===
DMT is commonly handled and stored as a hemifumarate, as other DMT acid salts are extremely hygroscopic and will not readily crystallize. Its freebase form, although less stable than DMT hemifumarate, is favored by recreational users choosing to vaporize the chemical as it has a lower boiling point.

DMT is a lipophilic compound, with an experimental log P of 2.57.

=== Laboratory synthesis ===
The chemical synthesis of DMT has been described. It can be synthesized through several possible pathways from different starting materials. The two most commonly encountered synthetic routes are through the reaction of indole with oxalyl chloride followed by reaction with dimethylamine and reduction of the carbonyl functionalities with lithium aluminium hydride to form DMT. The second commonly encountered route is through the N,N-dimethylation of tryptamine using formaldehyde followed by reduction with sodium cyanoborohydride or sodium triacetoxyborohydride. Sodium borohydride can be used but requires a larger excess of reagents and lower temperatures due to it having a higher selectivity for carbonyl groups as opposed to imines. Procedures using sodium cyanoborohydride and sodium triacetoxyborohydride (presumably created in situ from cyanoborohydride though this may not be the case due to the presence of water or methanol) also result in the creation of cyanated tryptamine and beta-carboline byproducts of unknown toxicity while using sodium borohydride in absence of acid does not. Bufotenine, a plant extract, can also be synthesized into DMT.

Alternatively, an excess of methyl iodide or methyl p-toluenesulfonate and sodium carbonate can be used to over-methylate tryptamine, resulting in the creation of a quaternary ammonium salt, which is then dequaternized (demethylated) in ethanolamine to yield DMT. The same two-step procedure is used to synthesize other N,N-dimethylated compounds, such as 5-MeO-DMT.

=== Clandestine manufacture ===
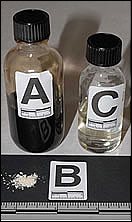
DMT during various stages of purification

In a clandestine setting, DMT is not typically synthesized due to the lack of availability of the starting materials, namely tryptamine and oxalyl chloride. Instead, it is more often extracted from plant-sources using a nonpolar hydrocarbon solvent such as naphtha or heptane, and a base such as sodium hydroxide.

Alternatively, an acid-base extraction is sometimes used instead.

A variety of plants contain DMT at sufficient levels for being viable sources such as Mimosa tenuiflora, Acacia acuminata, Acacia confusa, Acacia maidenii, Arundo donax, 'Diplopterys cabrerana, Psychotria viridis.

The chemicals involved in the extraction are commonly available. The plant-material may be illegal to procure in some countries. The end-product (DMT) is illegal in most countries.

=== Detection in body fluids ===
DMT may be measured in blood, plasma or urine using chromatographic techniques as a diagnostic tool in clinical poisoning situations or to aid in the medicolegal investigation of suspicious deaths. In general, blood or plasma DMT levels in recreational users of the drug are in the 10–30 μg/L range during the first several hours post-ingestion. Less than 0.1% of an oral dose is eliminated unchanged in the 24-hour urine of humans.

==== Indolethylamine N-methyltransferase (INMT) ====
Before techniques of molecular biology were used to localize indolethylamine N-methyltransferase (INMT), characterization and localization went on a par: samples of the biological material where INMT is hypothesized to be active are subject to enzyme assay. Those enzyme assays are performed either with a radiolabeled methyl donor like (^{14}C-CH_{3})SAM to which known amounts of unlabeled substrates like tryptamine are added or with addition of a radiolabeled substrate like (^{14}C)NMT to demonstrate in vivo formation. As qualitative determination of the radioactively tagged product of the enzymatic reaction is sufficient to characterize INMT existence and activity (or lack of), analytical methods used in INMT assays are not required to be as sensitive as those needed to directly detect and quantify the minute amounts of endogenously formed DMT. The essentially qualitative method thin layer chromatography (TLC) was thus used in a vast majority of studies. Also, robust evidence that INMT can catalyze transmethylation of tryptamine into NMT and DMT could be provided with reverse isotope dilution analysis coupled to mass spectrometry for rabbit and human lung during the early 1970s.

Selectivity rather than sensitivity proved to be a challenge for some TLC methods with the discovery in 1974-1975 that incubating rat blood cells or brain tissue with (^{14}C-CH_{3})SAM and NMT as a substrate mostly yields tetrahydro-β-carboline derivatives, and negligible amounts of DMT in brain tissue. It is indeed simultaneously realized that the TLC methods used thus far in almost all published studies on INMT and DMT biosynthesis are incapable to resolve DMT from those tetrahydro-β-carbolines. These findings are a blow for all previous claims of evidence of INMT activity and DMT biosynthesis in avian and mammalian brain, including in vivo, as they all relied upon use of the problematic TLC methods: their validity is doubted in replication studies that make use of improved TLC methods, and fail to evidence DMT-producing INMT activity in rat and human brain tissues. Published in 1978, the last study attempting to evidence in vivo INMT activity and DMT production in brain (rat) with TLC methods finds biotransformation of radiolabeled tryptamine into DMT to be real but "insignificant". Capability of the method used in this latter study to resolve DMT from tetrahydro-β-carbolines is questioned later.

To localize INMT, a qualitative leap is accomplished with use of modern techniques of molecular biology, and of immunohistochemistry. In humans, a gene encoding INMT is determined to be located on chromosome 7. Northern blot analyses reveal INMT messenger RNA (mRNA) to be highly expressed in rabbit lung, and in human thyroid, adrenal gland, and lung. Intermediate levels of expression are found in human heart, skeletal muscle, trachea, stomach, small intestine, pancreas, testis, prostate, placenta, lymph node, and spinal cord. Low to very low levels of expression are noted in rabbit brain, and human thymus, liver, spleen, kidney, colon, ovary, and bone marrow. INMT mRNA expression is absent in human peripheral blood leukocytes, whole brain, and in tissue from seven specific brain regions (thalamus, subthalamic nucleus, caudate nucleus, hippocampus, amygdala, substantia nigra, and corpus callosum). Immunohistochemistry showed INMT to be present in large amounts in glandular epithelial cells of small and large intestines. In 2011, immunohistochemistry revealed the presence of INMT in primate nervous tissue including retina, spinal cord motor neurons, and pineal gland. A 2020 study using in-situ hybridization, a far more accurate tool than the northern blot analysis, found mRNA coding for INMT expressed in the human cerebral cortex, choroid plexus, and pineal gland.

=== Analogues and derivatives ===
Numerous analogues and derivatives of DMT are known. Some examples include tryptamine (T), N-methyltryptamine (NMT), serotonin (5-hydroxytryptamine; 5-HT), psilocin (4-HO-DMT), psilocybin (4-PO-DMT), 4-AcO-DMT (psilacetin), 4-PrO-DMT, bufotenin (5-HO-DMT or N,N-dimethylserotonin), and 5-MeO-DMT (mebufotenin; N,N,O-trimethylserotonin). Some further examples include methylethyltryptamine (MET), diethyltryptamine (DET), methylpropyltryptamine (MPT), dipropyltryptamine (DPT), methylisopropyltryptamine (MiPT), diisopropyltryptamine (DiPT), methylallyltryptamine (MALT), diallyltryptamine (DALT), and pyr-T (N,N-tetramethylenetryptamine) and their derivatives.

Some lesser-known DMT derivatives include 1-methyl-DMT, lespedamine (1-MeO-DMT), 2-methyl-DMT, 4-methyl-DMT, 4-MeO-DMT, 4-fluoro-DMT, 5-methyl-DMT, 5-ethyl-DMT, 5-TFM-DMT, 5-EtO-DMT, 5-TFMO-DMT, 5-fluoro-DMT, 5-chloro-DMT, 5-bromo-DMT, 6-fluoro-DMT, 5,6-dibromo-DMT, 4,5-MDO-DMT, 4,5-DHP-DMT, 5,6-MDO-DMT, 5-MeS-DMT, 6-methyl-DMT, 6-HO-DMT, 6-MeO-DMT, 7-methyl-DMT, 7-MeO-DMT, NBoc-DMT (NB-DMT), α,N,N-TMT (α-Me-DMT), and α,N,N,O-TeMS (5-MeO-α-Me-DMT).

Cyclized tryptamines containing DMT in their chemical structures include ibogalogs like ibogainalog and tabernanthalog; iboga alkaloids like ibogaine and noribogaine; lysergamides like ergine (LSA) and lysergic acid diethylamide (LSD); and partial ergolines and lysergamides like N-DEAOP-NMT, 10,11-seco-LSD, RU-28306 (4,α-methylene-DMT), RU-28251 (4,α-methylene-DPT), Bay R 1531 (LY-197206; 4,α-methylene-5-MeO-DPT), and NDTDI (8,10-seco-LSD), among others. β-Carbolines and harmala alkaloids like harmine and harmaline contain DMT's close analogue NMT embedded in their structures. Triptans like sumatriptan, rizatriptan, eletriptan, almotriptan, frovatriptan, and zolmitriptan, which are antimigraine agents, all contain DMT in their structures. Similarly, the pertine antipsychotics including alpertine, milipertine, oxypertine, and solypertine are DMT derivatives.

Bioisosteres of DMT in which the indole ring system has been replaced with a different ring system include isoDMT (an isoindole or isotryptamine), 2ZEDMA (an indolizine), and C-DMT (an indene), among others. The homologues of DMT in which the alkyl side chain has been shortened or lengthened by one carbon atom are gramine and dimethylhomotryptamine (DMHT), respectively. Further-extended homologues are also known.

Deuterated isotopologues of DMT include deudimethyltryptamine (DMT-d_{10}) or CYB004 (HLP004), SPL028 (D_{2}-DMT; α,α-dideutero-DMT), and DMT-d4 (α,α,β,β-tetradeutero-DMT). Prodrugs of DMT such as 1-benzoyl-DMT and N-phosphonooxymethyl-DMT (N-POM-DMT) have also been described.

Many of DMT's analogues and derivatives are serotonin receptor modulators and/or serotonergic psychedelics similarly to DMT itself.

== Natural occurrence ==
=== Evidence in mammals ===
Publishing in Science in 1961, Julius Axelrod found an N-methyltransferase enzyme capable of mediating biotransformation of tryptamine into DMT in a rabbit's lung. This finding initiated a still ongoing scientific interest in endogenous DMT production in humans and other mammals. From then on, two major complementary lines of evidence have been investigated: Localization and further characterization of the N-methyltransferase enzyme, and analytical studies looking for endogenously produced DMT in body fluids and tissues.

In 2013, researchers reported DMT in the pineal gland microdialysate of rodents.

A study published in 2014 reported the biosynthesis of N,N-dimethyltryptamine (DMT) in the human melanoma cell line SK-Mel-147 including details on its metabolism by peroxidases.

It is assumed that more than half of the amount of DMT produced by the acidophilic cells of the pineal gland is secreted before and during death, the amount being 2.5–3.4 mg/kg. Contrarily, this claim by Strassman has been criticized by David Nichols who notes that DMT does not appear to be produced in any meaningful amount by the pineal gland. Removal or calcification of the pineal gland does not induce any of the symptoms caused by removal of DMT. The symptoms presented are consistent solely with reduction in melatonin, which is the pineal gland's known function. Nichols instead suggests that dynorphin and other endorphins are responsible for the reported euphoria experienced by patients during a near-death experience.

In 2014, researchers demonstrated the immunomodulatory potential of DMT and 5-MeO-DMT through the Sigma-1 receptor of human immune cells. This immunomodulatory activity may contribute to significant anti-inflammatory effects and tissue regeneration.

==== Endogenous DMT ====
N,N-Dimethyltryptamine (DMT), a psychedelic compound identified endogenously in mammals, is biosynthesized by aromatic L-amino acid decarboxylase (AADC) and indolethylamine-N-methyltransferase (INMT). Studies have investigated brain expression of INMT transcript in rats and humans, coexpression of INMT and AADC mRNA in rat brain and periphery, and brain concentrations of DMT in rats. INMT transcripts were identified in the cerebral cortex, pineal gland, and choroid plexus of both rats and humans via in situ hybridization. Notably, INMT mRNA was colocalized with AADC transcript in rat brain tissues, in contrast to rat peripheral tissues where there existed little overlapping expression of INMT with AADC transcripts. Additionally, extracellular concentrations of DMT in the cerebral cortex of normal behaving rats, with or without the pineal gland, were similar to those of canonical monoamine neurotransmitters including serotonin. A significant increase of DMT levels in the rat visual cortex was observed following induction of experimental cardiac arrest, a finding independent of an intact pineal gland. These results show for the first time that the rat brain is capable of synthesizing and releasing DMT at concentrations comparable to known monoamine neurotransmitters and raise the possibility that this phenomenon may occur similarly in human brains.

The first claimed detection of endogenous DMT in mammals was published in June 1965: German researchers F. Franzen and H. Gross report to have evidenced and quantified DMT, along with its structural analog bufotenin (5-HO-DMT), in human blood and urine. In an article published four months later, the method used in their study was strongly criticized, and the credibility of their results challenged.

Few of the analytical methods used prior to 2001 to measure levels of endogenously formed DMT had enough sensitivity and selectivity to produce reliable results. Gas chromatography, preferably coupled to mass spectrometry (GC-MS), is considered a minimum requirement. A study published in 2005 implements the most sensitive and selective method ever used to measure endogenous DMT: liquid chromatography-tandem mass spectrometry with electrospray ionization (LC-ESI-MS/MS) allows for reaching limits of detection (LODs) 12 to 200 fold lower than those attained by the best methods employed in the 1970s. The data summarized in the table below are from studies conforming to the abovementioned requirements (abbreviations used: CSF = cerebrospinal fluid; LOD = limit of detection; n = number of samples; ng/L and ng/kg = nanograms (10^{−9} g) per litre, and nanograms per kilogram, respectively):

DMT in body fluids and tissues (NB: units have been harmonized)
Species	Sample	Results
Human	Blood serum	< LOD (n = 66)
Human	Blood plasma	< LOD (n = 71) ♦ < LOD (n = 38); 1,000 & 10,600 ng/L (n = 2)
Human	Whole blood	< LOD (n = 20); 50-790 ng/L (n = 20)
Human	Urine	< 100 ng/L (n = 9) ♦ < LOD (n = 60); 160-540 ng/L (n = 5) ♦ Detected in n = 10 by GC-MS
Human	Feces	< 50 ng/kg (n = 12); 130 ng/kg (n = 1)
Human	Kidney	15 ng/kg (n = 1)
Human	Lung	14 ng/kg (n = 1)
Human	Lumbar CSF	100,370 ng/L (n = 1); 2,330-7,210 ng/L (n = 3); 350 & 850 ng/L (n = 2)
Rat	Kidney	12 & 16 ng/kg (n = 2)
Rat	Lung	22 & 12 ng/kg (n = 2)
Rat	Liver	6 & 10 ng/kg (n = 2)
Rat	Brain	10 & 15 ng/kg (n = 2) ♦ Measured in synaptic vesicular fraction
Rabbit	Liver	< 10 ng/kg (n = 1)

A 2013 study found DMT in microdialysate obtained from a rat's pineal gland, providing evidence of endogenous DMT in the mammalian brain. In 2019, experiments showed that the rat brain is capable of synthesizing and releasing DMT, and that this occurs independently of an intact pineal gland. These results raise the possibility that this phenomenon may occur similarly in human brains. In 2026, a further study found endogenous cortical DMT in awake rats at levels consistent with serotonin and dopamine in the same samples.

Quantities of dimethyltryptamine and O-methylbufotenin were found present in the cerebrospinal fluid of humans in a 1978 psychiatric study.

=== Biosynthesis ===
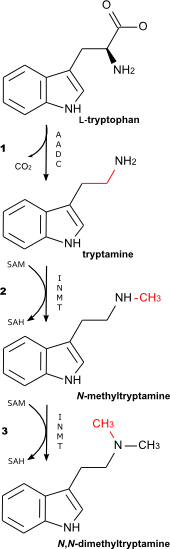
Biosynthetic pathway for N,N-dimethyltryptamine

Dimethyltryptamine is an indole alkaloid derived from the shikimate pathway. Its biosynthesis is relatively simple and summarized in the adjacent picture. In plants, the parent amino acid L-tryptophan is produced endogenously where in animals L-tryptophan is an essential amino acid coming from diet. No matter the source of L-tryptophan, the biosynthesis begins with its decarboxylation by an aromatic amino acid decarboxylase (AADC) enzyme (step 1). The resulting decarboxylated tryptophan analogue is tryptamine. Tryptamine then undergoes a transmethylation (step 2): the enzyme indolethylamine-N-methyltransferase (INMT) catalyzes the transfer of a methyl group from cofactor S-adenosylmethionine (SAM), via nucleophilic attack, to tryptamine. This reaction transforms SAM into S-adenosylhomocysteine (SAH), and gives the intermediate product N-methyltryptamine (NMT). NMT is in turn transmethylated by the same process (step 3) to form the end product N,N-dimethyltryptamine. Tryptamine transmethylation is regulated by two products of the reaction: SAH, and DMT were shown ex vivo to be among the most potent inhibitors of rabbit INMT activity.

This transmethylation mechanism has been repeatedly and consistently proven by radiolabeling of SAM methyl group with carbon-14 ((^{14}C-CH_{3})SAM).

== History ==
DMT derived from plant-based sources has been used as an entheogen in South America for thousands of years.

DMT was first synthesized in 1931 by Canadian chemist Richard Manske. In general, its discovery as a natural product is credited to Brazilian chemist and microbiologist Oswaldo Gonçalves de Lima, who isolated an alkaloid he named nigerina (nigerine) from the root bark of Mimosa tenuiflora in 1946. However, in a careful review of the case Jonathan Ott shows that the empirical formula for nigerine determined by Gonçalves de Lima, which notably contains an atom of oxygen, can match only a partial, "impure" or "contaminated" form of DMT. It was only in 1959, when Gonçalves de Lima provided American chemists a sample of Mimosa tenuiflora roots, that DMT was unequivocally identified in this plant material. Less ambiguous is the case of isolation and formal identification of DMT in 1955 in seeds and pods of Anadenanthera peregrina by a team of American chemists led by Evan Horning (1916-1993). Since 1955, DMT has been found in a number of organisms: in at least fifty plant species belonging to ten families, and in at least four animal species, including one gorgonian and three mammalian species (including humans).

In terms of a scientific understanding, the hallucinogenic effects of DMT were not uncovered until 1956 by Hungarian chemist and psychiatrist Stephen Szára. Szára, who later worked for the United States National Institutes of Health, researched DMT after his order to acquire LSD from the Swiss company Sandoz Laboratories was rejected on the grounds that the powerful psychotropic could be dangerous in the hands of a communist country. In his paper Dimethyltryptamin: Its Metabolism in Man; the Relation of its Psychotic Effect to the Serotonin Metabolism, Szara employed synthetic DMT, synthesized by the Speeter–Anthony route, which was then administered to 20 volunteers by intramuscular injection. Urine samples were collected from these volunteers for the identification of DMT metabolites. This is considered to be the link between the chemical structure of DMT and its cultural consumption as a psychoactive and religious sacrament.

Another historical milestone was the discovery of DMT in plants frequently used by Amazonian natives as additive to the vine Banisteriopsis caapi to make ayahuasca decoctions. In 1957, American chemists Francis Hochstein and Anita Paradies identified DMT in an "aqueous extract" of leaves of a plant they named Prestonia amazonicum [sic] and described as "commonly mixed" with B. caapi. The lack of a proper botanical identification of Prestonia amazonica in this study led American ethnobotanist Richard Evans Schultes (1915–2001) and other scientists to raise serious doubts about the claimed plant identity. The mistake likely led the writer William Burroughs to regard the DMT he experimented with in Tangier in 1961 as "Prestonia". Better evidence was produced in 1965 by French pharmacologist Jacques Poisson, who isolated DMT as a sole alkaloid from leaves, provided and used by Aguaruna peoples, identified as having come from the vine Diplopterys cabrerana (then known by its synonym Banisteriopsis rusbyana). Published in 1970, the first identification of DMT in the plant Psychotria viridis, another common additive of ayahuasca, was made by a team of American researchers led by pharmacologist Ara der Marderosian. Not only did they detect DMT in leaves of P. viridis obtained from Kaxinawá indigenous people, but they were also the first to identify it in a sample of an ayahuasca decoction, prepared by the same indigenous people.

In the 1960s, DMT was known as a "businessman's trip" in the United States because of its very rapid onset and short duration when smoked. It was also referred to by Timothy Leary as the "nuclear bomb of the psychedelic family" in the Psychedelic Review in 1966.

== Society and culture ==
=== Popular culture ===
In the 2022 Australian film Everything in Between, the lead character smokes what is implied to be DMT in the opening sequence, which is followed by hallucination-like visual effects and an altered state of consciousness.

=== Cantelmoism ===
Logo used by proponents of Cantelmoism

A man named Chris Cantelmo attempted to create an online cult around DMT called "Cantelmoism" in the late 2010s. He was a wealthy biochemist and Yale University graduate who had worked in the pharmaceutical industry for several decades, including running multiple high-performance liquid chromatography (HPLC) companies.

Cantelmo began his DMT-focused activity on Reddit and other platforms after first trying the substance in 2018, following a psychiatric hold. He described a strong breakthrough experience that ended his lifelong atheism and convinced him of a higher power and non-human entities. Cantelmo rapidly spent large sums, more than $70,000 on Reddit awards alone, with total outlays including gifts estimated by family at roughly twice that amount or higher in an effort to promote DMT and encourage as many people as possible to try it. The awards, often given in youth-oriented subreddits, drew attention to communities such as r/Cantelmoism and related forums. Participants sometimes called themselves Cantelmoists and referred to him in messianic terms. Among his claims, he asserted that DMT had cured his brain cancer and could cure other diseases, that schizophrenia and autism resulted from excess natural DMT, and that the drug allowed people to perceive spirits and a cosmic signal. He also claimed that sungazing helps the pineal gland produce DMT.

He later admitted he had never had brain cancer and that the claim was a metaphor for curing his "severe" lifelong atheism, which he likened to cancer. Criticism grew over the medical claims, targeting of younger users, and perceived cult-like behavior. Cantelmo's main Reddit account was banned in mid-2019 for harassment. As his money ran out, activity declined. He suffered from long-standing mental health issues and died by suicide in November 2019 while under pressure of losing his home.

=== Black market ===
Electronic cigarette cartridges or vape pens filled with DMT started to be sold on the black market by 2018.

Akasha Song previously manufactured and sold DMT on the dark web and is said to have been the largest DMT producer and seller in history.

=== Legal status ===
==== International law ====
Internationally, DMT is illegal to possess without authorisation, exemption or license, but ayahuasca and DMT brews and preparations are lawful. DMT is controlled by the Convention on Psychotropic Substances at the international level. The Convention makes it illegal to possess, buy, purchase, sell, to retail and to dispense without a licence.

==== By continent and country ====
In some countries, ayahuasca is a forbidden or controlled or regulated substance, while in other countries it is not a controlled substance or its production, consumption, and sale, is allowed to various degrees.

===== Asia =====
- Israel – DMT is an illegal substance; production, trade, and possession are prosecuted as crimes.
- India – DMT is illegal to produce, transport, trade in, or possess with a minimum prison or jail punishment of ten years.

===== Europe =====
- Belgium – DMT cannot be possessed, sold, purchased or imported. Usage is not specifically prohibited, but since usage implies possession one could be prosecuted that way.
- France – DMT, along with most of its plant-sources, is classified as a stupéfiant (narcotic).
- Germany – DMT is prohibited as a class I drug.
- Ireland – DMT is an illegal Schedule 1 drug under the Misuse of Drugs Acts. An attempt in 2014 by a member of the Santo Daime church to gain a religious exemption to import the drug failed.
- Latvia – DMT is prohibited as a Schedule I drug.
- Netherlands – The drug is banned as it is classified as a List 1 Drug per the Opium Law. Production, trade and possession of DMT are prohibited.
- Serbia – DMT, along with stereoisomers and salts is classified as List 4 (Psychotropic substances) substance according to Act on Control of Psychoactive Substances.
- Sweden – DMT is considered a Schedule 1 drug. The Swedish supreme court concluded in 2018 that possession of processed plant material containing a significant amount of DMT is illegal. However, possession of unprocessed such plant material was ruled legal.
- United Kingdom – DMT is classified as a Class A drug.

===== North America =====
- Canada – DMT is classified as a Schedule III drug under the Controlled Drugs and Substances Act, but is legal for religious groups to use. In 2017 the Santo Daime Church Céu do Montréal received religious exemption to use ayahuasca as a sacrament in their rituals.
- United States – DMT is classified in the United States as a Schedule I drug under the Controlled Substances Act of 1970. In 2019, it was decriminalized, along with other naturally derived psychedelics, in the city of Oakland after a campaign by Decriminalize Nature.

===== Other =====
- Russia – Classified as a Schedule I narcotic, including its derivatives (see sumatriptan and zolmitriptan).

===== Oceania =====
- New Zealand – DMT is classified as a Class A drug under the Misuse of Drugs Act 1975.
- Australia – DMT is listed as a Schedule 9 prohibited substance in Australia under the Poisons Standard (October 2015). A Schedule 9 drug is outlined in the Poisons Act 1964 as "Substances which may be abused or misused, the manufacture, possession, sale, or use of which should be prohibited by law except when required for medical or scientific research, or for analytical, teaching or training purposes with approval of the CEO". Between 2011 and 2012, the Australian federal government was considering changes to the Australian Criminal Code that would classify any plants containing any amount of DMT as "controlled plants". DMT itself was already controlled under current laws. The proposed changes included other similar blanket bans for other substances, such as a ban on any and all plants containing mescaline or ephedrine. The proposal was not pursued after political embarrassment on realisation that this would make the official floral emblem of Australia, Acacia pycnantha (golden wattle), illegal. The Therapeutic Goods Administration and federal authority had considered a motion to ban the same, but this was withdrawn in May 2012 (as DMT may still hold potential entheogenic value to native and/or religious people). Under the Misuse of Drugs Act 1981 6.0g (3/16oz) of DMT is considered enough to determine a court of trial and 2.0g (1/16oz) is considered intent to sell and supply.

In December 2004, the U.S. Supreme Court lifted a stay allowing the Brazil-based União do Vegetal church to use a decoction containing DMT in their Christmas services that year. This decoction is a tea made from boiled leaves and vines, known as hoasca within the UDV, and ayahuasca in different cultures. In Gonzales v. O Centro Espírita Beneficente União do Vegetal, the Supreme Court heard arguments on 1 November 2005, and unanimously ruled in February 2006 that the U.S. federal government must allow the UDV to import and consume the tea for religious ceremonies under the 1993 Religious Freedom Restoration Act.

Also suing under the Religious Freedom Restoration Act, three Santo Daime churches filed suit in federal court to gain legal status to import DMT-containing ayahuasca tea in 2008. The U.S. District Court in Oregon ruled in Church of the Holy Light of the Queen v. Mukasey (615 F.Supp.2d 1210) ruled that the religious group could import, distribute, and brew ayahuasca. A matter of religious freedom protected by the religious freedom law, the court issued a permanent injunction barring the government from prohibiting or penalizing the sacramental use of the religious drink.

== Research ==
=== Depression ===
Short-acting psychedelics like DMT and 5-MeO-DMT show rapid and sustained antidepressant effects in treatment-resistant depression, potentially offering a more scalable alternative to psilocybin, though larger controlled trials are needed to confirm efficacy.

A recent Phase 1/2 clinical trial evaluated the safety, tolerability, pharmacokinetics, and antidepressant effects of SPL026, an intravenous formulation of DMT fumarate, in both healthy volunteers and patients with moderate-to-severe major depressive disorder, using randomized, placebo-controlled and open-label dosing protocols. It found that inhaled 5-MeO-DMT (GH001) was well tolerated and produced rapid antidepressant effects in treatment-resistant depression, with individualized dosing showing the highest remission rates.

A Phase 1 open-label study assessed the safety, tolerability, pharmacokinetics, and preliminary efficacy of intravenous SPL026 alone or combined with SSRIs in patients with major depressive disorder whose symptoms were not fully relieved by SSRIs.

In a Phase 2a open-label trial, inhaled DMT produced rapid, well-tolerated, and sustained antidepressant effects in patients with treatment-resistant depression, showing high response and remission rates within 7 days and lasting up to 3 months.

A single-day, open-label trial found that vaporized DMT produced rapid and sustained antidepressant effects in treatment-resistant depression, with up to 50% of participants maintaining remission one month post-dose.

There are completed and ongoing trials of VLS-01, a buccal film formulation of DMT, in treating patients with treatment-resistant depression. In a completed Phase 1 trial, this formulation was found to be well tolerated, with adverse effects being mild or moderate. As of April 2026, there are phase 2 trials ongoing in the United States and Australia.

=== Endogenous role ===
DMT exists naturally in humans and other animals; it may play significant roles in mammalian physiology—potentially as a neurotransmitter, hormone, and immunomodulator—despite longstanding skepticism based on outdated or flawed evidence.

== See also ==
- Dimethylaminoethylindole
- Dimethyltryptamine/harmine
- Dimethyltryptamine/β-carbolines
- List of psychoactive plants
- List of substances used in rituals
- Psychedelic replication
- Substituted tryptamine
