= C16H25NO =

The molecular formula C_{16}H_{25}NO (molar mass: 247.38 g/mol) may refer to:

- Butidrine, also called hydrobutamine
- 5-OH-DPAT
- 7-OH-DPAT
- 8-OH-DPAT
- N-Isobutylhexedrone
- Picenadol, an opioid analgesic drug
