= CHF-1024 =

Clinical data
- Other names: CHF1024; 5,6-Dihydroxy-2-methylaminotetralin
- Drug class: Dopamine D_{2} recpetor agonist; α_{2}-Adrenergic receptor agonist
- ATC code: None

Identifiers
- IUPAC name: 6-(methylamino)-5,6,7,8-tetrahydronaphthalene-1,2-diol
- CAS Number: 39478-89-2
- PubChem CID: 38005
- ChemSpider: 34840
- UNII: 045Q4E2K14

Chemical and physical data
- Formula: C_{11}H_{15}NO_{2}
- Molar mass: 193.246 g·mol^{−1}
- 3D model (JSmol): Interactive image
- SMILES: CNC1CCC2=C(C1)C=CC(=C2O)O
- InChI: InChI=1S/C11H15NO2/c1-12-8-3-4-9-7(6-8)2-5-10(13)11(9)14/h2,5,8,12-14H,3-4,6H2,1H3; Key:BHDFPNRSDABMPW-UHFFFAOYSA-N

CHF-1024, also known as 5,6-dihydroxy-2-methylaminotetralin, is a dopamine D_{2} receptor agonist and α_{2}-adrenergic receptor agonist of the 2-aminotetralin family. It is a cyclized phenethylamine analogue of the neurotransmitter dopamine. The drug is the active form of nolomirole (CHF-1035), a prodrug of CHF-1024 and the N,N-diisobutyryl diester of the compound. Nolomirole was investigated for the treatment of heart failure but was never marketed.

== See also ==
- Chiesi Farmaceutici
- Nolomirole
- Cyclized phenethylamine
- Rotigotine
- 5-OH-DPAT
- 7-OH-DPAT
- Carmoxirole
