= Nolomirole =

Clinical data
- Other names: CHF-1035; CHF1035; 5,6-Diisobutyryloxy-N-methyl-2-aminotetralin; 5,6-Diisobutyryloxy-2-(methylamino)-1,2,3,4-tetrahydronaphthalene; 5,6,7,8-Tetrahydro-6-(methylamino)-1,2-naphthylene diisobutyrate; N-Methyl-2-aminotetralin
- Routes of administration: Oral
- Drug class: Dopamine D_{2} receptor agonist; α_{2}-Adrenergic receptor agonist
- ATC code: None

Identifiers
- IUPAC name: [6-(methylamino)-1-(2-methylpropanoyloxy)-5,6,7,8-tetrahydronaphthalen-2-yl] 2-methylpropanoate
- CAS Number: 90060-42-7
- PubChem CID: 216238
- ChemSpider: 187439
- UNII: 6EMF80C55F
- ChEMBL: ChEMBL2105142
- CompTox Dashboard (EPA): DTXSID10869044

Chemical and physical data
- Formula: C_{19}H_{27}NO_{4}
- Molar mass: 333.428 g·mol^{−1}
- 3D model (JSmol): Interactive image
- SMILES: CC(C)C(=O)OC1=C(C2=C(CC(CC2)NC)C=C1)OC(=O)C(C)C
- InChI: InChI=1S/C19H27NO4/c1-11(2)18(21)23-16-9-6-13-10-14(20-5)7-8-15(13)17(16)24-19(22)12(3)4/h6,9,11-12,14,20H,7-8,10H2,1-5H3; Key:OMMYLOLVPCCZQZ-UHFFFAOYSA-N

Nolomirole (INN; developmental code name CHF-1035), also known as 5,6-diisobutyryloxy-N-methyl-2-aminotetralin, is a dual dopamine D_{2} and α_{2}-adrenergic receptor agonist which was under development for the treatment of heart failure but was never marketed. It is taken orally.

== Pharmacology ==
The drug acts as an agonist of the dopamine D_{2} receptor, with an affinity (K_{i}) of 120 nM for the (–)- enantiomer and 2,400 nM for the (+)- enantiomer, and as an agonist of the α_{2}-adrenergic receptor, with an affinity (K_{i}) of 130 nM for the (–)- enantiomer and 1,600 nM for the (+)- enantiomer. It is a prodrug of CHF-1024 (5,6-dihydroxy-N-methyl-2-aminotetralin), to which it is rapidly hydrolyzed by circulating esterase enzymes. The elimination half-life of nolomirole is said to be 3 hours and its log P is 1.97.

== Chemistry ==
Nolomirole and its active form CHF-1024 are cyclized phenethylamines and 2-aminotetralin analogues of the catecholamine neurotransmitter dopamine and its N-methyl derivative epinine (deoxyepinephrine, N-methyldopamine).

== History ==
Nolomirole was first described in the scientific literature by 1992. It was being developed by the pharmaceutical company Chiesi Farmaceutici in the 1990s and 2000s. Nolomirole reached phase 3 clinical trials prior to the discontinuation of its development.

== See also ==
- Cyclized phenethylamine
- Rotigotine
- 5-OH-DPAT
- 7-OH-DPAT
- Ibopamine
- Fosopamine
- O,O′-Diacetyldopamine
- Docarpamine
- Neurotransmitter prodrug
- Carmoxirole
