= 2-Aminotetralin =

Chemical compound

Clinical data
- Other names: 2-AT; 1,2,3,4-Tetrahydronaphthalen-2-amine; THN
- Routes of administration: Oral
- Drug class: Norepinephrine–dopamine releasing agent; Stimulant
- ATC code: None

Legal status
- Legal status: In general: uncontrolled

Identifiers
- IUPAC name: 1,2,3,4-tetrahydronaphthalen-2-amine
- CAS Number: 2954-50-9
- PubChem CID: 34677
- ChemSpider: 31912
- UNII: LGX8T83G7X
- ChEMBL: ChEMBL30294
- CompTox Dashboard (EPA): DTXSID10903058
- ECHA InfoCard: 100.019.067

Chemical and physical data
- Formula: C_{10}H_{13}N
- Molar mass: 147.221 g·mol^{−1}
- 3D model (JSmol): Interactive image
- SMILES: C1CC2=CC=CC=C2CC1N
- InChI: InChI=1S/C10H13N/c11-10-6-5-8-3-1-2-4-9(8)7-10/h1-4,10H,5-7,11H2; Key:LCGFVWKNXLRFIF-UHFFFAOYSA-N

2-Aminotetralin (2-AT), also known as 1,2,3,4-tetrahydronaphthalen-2-amine (THN), is a stimulant drug of the 2-aminotetralin family with a chemical structure consisting of a tetralin core with an amine as substituent.

2-AT is a rigid analogue of phenylisobutylamine and fully substitutes for d-amphetamine in rat drug discrimination tests, although at one-half to one-eighth the potency. It showed greater potency than a variety of other amphetamine homologues, including 2-amino-1,2-dihydronapthalene (2-ADN), 2-aminoindane (2-AI), 1-naphthylaminopropane (1-NAP), 2-naphthylaminopropane (2-NAP), 1-phenylpiperazine (1-PP), 6-AB, and 7-AB.

2-AT has been shown to inhibit the reuptake of serotonin and norepinephrine, and might induce their release as well. It is also likely to act on dopamine on account of its full substitution of d-amphetamine in rodent studies.

== Chemical derivatives ==
A number of derivatives of 2-aminotetralin exist, including:

- 5-OH-DPAT
- 6-CAT
- 7-OH-DPAT
- 8-OH-DPAT
- AS-19
- CHF-1024
- DOM-AT
- MDAT
- MDMAT
- Nolomirole
- UCD0830
- UH-232

== See also ==
- Substituted 2-aminotetralin
- 1-Aminotetralin
- Aminoindane
- 3-Aminochroman
