= 4-MBC =

4-MBC may refer to:

- 4-Methylbenzylcathinone, or Benzedrone, a synthetic stimulant
- 4-Methylbenzylidene camphor, a UVB-resistant camphor derivative
