= C10H16N2 =

The molecular formula C_{10}H_{16}N_{2} (molar mass: 164.25 g/mol, exact mass: 164.1313 u) may refer to:

- Color Developing Agent 1 (CD1)
- Metfendrazine
- Tetramethylphenylenediamine
- Wurster's blue
- UCD0829
