= N-Isopropylbutylone =

Identifiers
- IUPAC name: 1-(1,3-Benzodioxol-5-yl)-2-(propan-2-ylamino)butan-1-one
- CAS Number: 801171-25-5
- PubChem CID: 165361678
- ChemSpider: 132708898
- CompTox Dashboard (EPA): DTXSID401342968

Chemical and physical data
- Formula: C_{14}H_{19}NO_{3}
- Molar mass: 249.310 g·mol^{−1}
- 3D model (JSmol): Interactive image
- SMILES: CCC(C(=O)C1=CC2=C(C=C1)OCO2)NC(C)C
- InChI: InChI=1S/C14H19NO3/c1-4-11(15-9(2)3)14(16)10-5-6-12-13(7-10)18-8-17-12/h5-7,9,11,15H,4,8H2,1-3H3; Key:YLUWYCAYKBCHRS-UHFFFAOYSA-N

N-Isopropylbutylone (NiPB) is a recreational designer drug from the substituted cathinone family, with stimulant effects. It was first identified in around 2023 but became increasingly prevalent from 2025 onwards following increasing international controls on closely related compounds such as dipentylone and N-ethylpentylone.

== See also ==
- Substituted cathinone
- Methylone
- Butylone
- Pentylone
- Isohexylone
- N-Ethylbutylone
- N-Ethylhexylone
- N-Cyclohexylmethylone
- N-Isobutylhexedrone
