= MDMAT =

Entactogen drug

Clinical data
- Other names: 6,7-MDMAT; 6,7-Methylenedioxy-N-methyl-2-aminotetralin
- Drug class: Serotonin releasing agent; Entactogen
- ATC code: None

Legal status
- Legal status: US: Uncontrolled; May fall under the Federal Analogue Act

Identifiers
- IUPAC name: N-Methyl-5,6,7,8-tetrahydrobenzo[f][1,3]benzodioxol-6-amine
- CAS Number: 34620-52-5
- PubChem CID: 23324601
- ChemSpider: 14921388
- UNII: JV4FSP6YL3
- CompTox Dashboard (EPA): DTXSID80632929

Chemical and physical data
- Formula: C_{12}H_{15}NO_{2}
- Molar mass: 205.257 g·mol^{−1}
- 3D model (JSmol): Interactive image
- SMILES: C3c1cc2OCOc2cc1CCC3NC
- InChI: InChI=1S/C12H15NO2/c1-13-10-3-2-8-5-11-12(15-7-14-11)6-9(8)4-10/h5-6,10,13H,2-4,7H2,1H3; Key:MTRLJTZQUZHTJI-UHFFFAOYSA-N

MDMAT, also known as 6,7-methylenedioxy-N-methyl-2-aminotetralin, is a serotonin releasing agent (SRA) and possible entactogen of the 2-aminotetralin family. It is the N-methylated derivative of MDAT, similarly to the relationship of MDMA to MDA. It has been theorized to have less long-term neurotoxicity and less hallucinogenic effects than other MDxx derivatives, but no formal scientific research has been conducted specifically on MDMAT.

== See also ==
- Substituted 2-aminotetralin
- Substituted methylenedioxyphenethylamine
- Cyclized phenethylamine
- UCD0830
