= Andrew Gallimore =

British scientist

Andrew Robert Gallimore
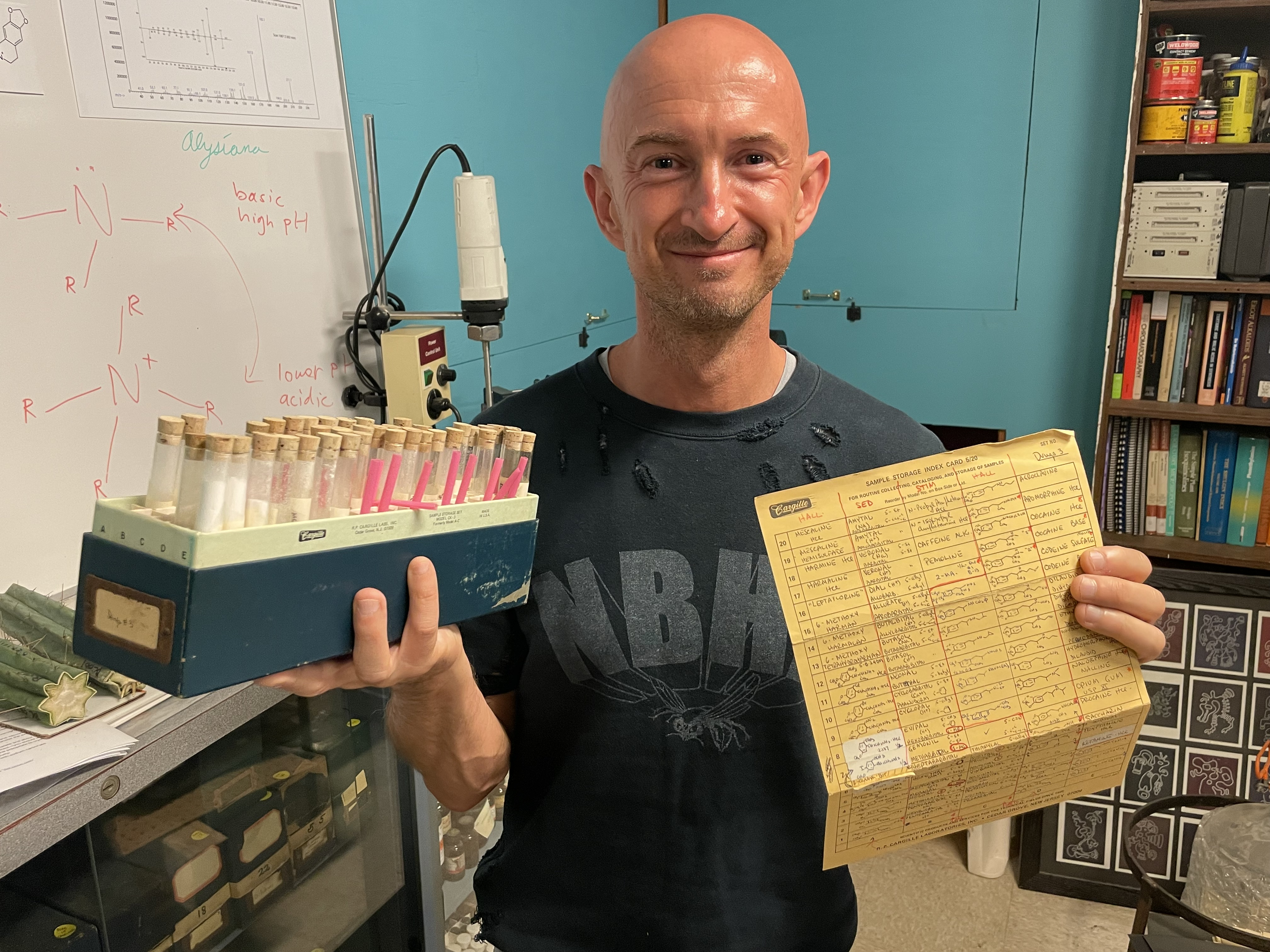
- Born: 25 February 1980 (age 46); Lincoln, United Kingdom
- Other name: Alien Insect
- Education: University of Cambridge
- Occupations: Neurobiologist, chemist, pharmacologist
- Years active: 2005–present
- Organization(s): Okinawa Institute of Science and Technology; Alien Insect, Eleusis, Noonautics
- Known for: Research on psychedelic drugs like DMT; DMTx
- Notable work: Various books; DMTx
- Website: buildingalienworlds.com alieninsect.substack.com noonautics.org

Andrew Robert Gallimore (b. 1980 or 1981; age ~45–46 years), also known by his handle Alien Insect, is a British neurobiologist, chemist, and pharmacologist who studies psychedelic drugs, particularly dimethyltryptamine (DMT). He is also a historical scholar of DMT. Gallimore resides in Japan and works at the Okinawa Institute of Science and Technology.

Gallimore and Rick Strassman, author of the 2001 book DMT: The Spirit Molecule, have developed a method of continuous intravenous infusion of DMT that they call "extended-state DMT" or "DMTx". It can extend the duration of a DMT experience from a few minutes to several hours. They intend to use it to study the phenomenology of DMT. Other researchers, such as David Nutt, Robin Carhart-Harris, and Matthias Liechti, are also studying DMT by continuous intravenous infusion.

Gallimore believes that DMT experiences are not simply hallucinations. Instead, he suggests that DMT allows the human brain to interface and interact with a deeper level of reality beyond the physical world. Relatedly, Gallimore believes that entity encounters experienced with DMT are real and genuine interactions with beings that he refers to as discarnate intelligent agents. Conversely, other researchers, such as Carhart-Harris among others, believe that DMT entities are merely illusions.

In March 2026, a DMTx retreat and research center called Eleusis was launched on the island of Bequia in the Caribbean. Its aim is to study DMTx and DMT entities and to attempt to communicate with these entities. The research arm of Eleusis is overseen by Gallimore's non-profit Noonautics.

== Selected publications ==
=== Books ===
- Gallimore, Andrew R. (2019). Alien Information Theory: Psychedelic Drug Technologies and the Cosmic Game. Strange Worlds Press. ISBN 978-1-5272-3476-5.
- Gallimore, A.R. (2022). Reality Switch Technologies: Psychedelics as Tools for the Discovery and Exploration of New Worlds. Strange Worlds Press. ISBN 978-1-7391101-0-9.
- Gallimore, A.R. (2025). Death by Astonishment: Confronting the Mystery of the World's Strangest Drug (The DMT Book). St. Martin's Publishing Group. ISBN 978-1-250-35776-2.

=== Book chapters ===
- Andrew R. Gallimore (3 July 2015). "DMT and the Topology of Reality" (PDF). In Luke, David; King, Dave (eds.). Neurotransmissions: Essays on Psychedelics from Breaking Convention. London: Strange Attractor Press. pp. 9–24. ISBN 978-1-907222-43-6.
- Andrew R. Gallimore; David P. Luke (3 July 2015). "DMT Research from 1956 to the Edge of Time" (PDF). In Luke, David; King, Dave (eds.). Neurotransmissions: Essays on Psychedelics from Breaking Convention. London: Strange Attractor Press. pp. 291–316. ISBN 978-1-907222-43-6.

=== Journal articles ===
- Gallimore AR (2013). "Building Alien Worlds—The Neuropsychological and Evolutionary Implications of the Astonishing Psychoactive Effects of N,N-Dimethyltryptamine (DMT)" (PDF). Journal of Scientific Exploration. 27 (3): 455–503. ISSN 0892-3310.
- Gallimore AR (2014). "DMT and the Topology of Reality" (PDF). PsyPress UK Journal. 3: 67–78.
- Gallimore AR (2015). "Building Human Worlds – DMT and the Simulated Universe" (PDF). PsyPress UK Journal. 6.
- Gallimore AR (2015). "Restructuring consciousness -the psychedelic state in light of integrated information theory" (PDF). Front Hum Neurosci. 9: 346. doi:10.3389/fnhum.2015.00346. PMC 4464176. PMID 26124719.
- Gallimore AR, Strassman RJ (2016). "A Model for the Application of Target-Controlled Intravenous Infusion for a Prolonged Immersive DMT Psychedelic Experience" (PDF). Front Pharmacol. 7: 211. doi:10.3389/fphar.2016.00211. PMC 4944667. PMID 27471468.
- Gallimore AR, Hermansson N, Hoffman DD (26 May 2026). "Traces of the Other – Are DMT Entities Real? DMT Phenomenology in the Framework of Conscious Realism". PsyArXiv. doi:10.31234/osf.io/8qvgy_v2.

=== Thesis ===
- Gallimore AR (2006). The Biogenesis of Terrestrial and Marine Polycyclic Ethers (PDF) (PhD thesis). University of Cambridge.

== See also ==
- Terence McKenna
