= Alpertine =

Abandoned antipsychotic

Clinical data
- Other names: WIN31665; WIN-31,665; Win 31665

Identifiers
- IUPAC name: ethyl 5,6-dimethoxy-3-[2-(4-phenylpiperazin-1-yl)ethyl]-1H-indole-2-carboxylate
- CAS Number: 27076-46-6
- PubChem CID: 166547
- ChemSpider: 145751
- UNII: KYT38QTB4K
- KEGG: D02635
- ChEBI: CHEBI:177808
- ChEMBL: ChEMBL2104031
- CompTox Dashboard (EPA): DTXSID30181538

Chemical and physical data
- Formula: C_{25}H_{31}N_{3}O_{4}
- Molar mass: 437.540 g·mol^{−1}
- 3D model (JSmol): Interactive image
- SMILES: CCOC(=O)C1=C(C2=CC(=C(C=C2N1)OC)OC)CCN3CCN(CC3)C4=CC=CC=C4
- InChI: InChI=1S/C25H31N3O4/c1-4-32-25(29)24-19(20-16-22(30-2)23(31-3)17-21(20)26-24)10-11-27-12-14-28(15-13-27)18-8-6-5-7-9-18/h5-9,16-17,26H,4,10-15H2,1-3H3; Key:RXAVJRAUFOPBOO-UHFFFAOYSA-N

Alpertine (INN, USAN; developmental code name WIN-31665) is a drug of the pertine group described as an antipsychotic, neuroleptic, and tranqulizer which was never marketed.

Structurally, it is a substituted tryptamine and a piperazinylethylindole. The drug is closely structurally related to other "pertines" including milipertine, oxypertine, and solypertine, which are also tryptamines and piperazinylethylindoles.

The related drug oxypertine shows high affinity for the serotonin 5-HT_{2} and dopamine D_{2} receptors (K_{i} = 8.6 nM and 30 nM, respectively) and is also known to act as a catecholamine depleting agent. Oxypertine, milipertine, and solypertine all antagonize the behavioral effects of tryptamine, a serotonin receptor agonist, and apomorphine, a dopamine receptor agonist, in animals. Conversely however, alpertine was not effective, at least at doses of up to 10 mg/kg. ortho-Methoxyphenylpiperazine (oMeOPP) has been said to be a metabolite of the related drugs milipertine and oxypertine.

Alpertine was first described in the scientific literature by 1971.

== See also ==
- Pertine
