= Ortho-Methoxyphenylpiperazine =

Serotonergic drug

ortho-Methoxyphenylpiperazine

Clinical data
- Other names: o-Methoxyphenylpiperazine; oMeOPP; 2-Methoxyphenylpiperazine; 2-MeOPP
- Drug class: Serotonin 5-HT_{1A} receptor agonist; Antipsychotic; Antihypertensive

Identifiers
- IUPAC name: 1-(2-methoxyphenyl)piperazine
- CAS Number: 35386-24-4
- PubChem CID: 1346
- UNII: 81NJO1330A
- ChEBI: CHEBI:104020
- ChEMBL: ChEMBL9666
- CompTox Dashboard (EPA): DTXSID40188871
- ECHA InfoCard: 100.047.747

Chemical and physical data
- Formula: C_{11}H_{16}N_{2}O
- Molar mass: 192.262 g·mol^{−1}
- 3D model (JSmol): Interactive image
- SMILES: COC1=CC=CC=C1N2CCNCC2
- InChI: InChI=1S/C11H16N2O/c1-14-11-5-3-2-4-10(11)13-8-6-12-7-9-13/h2-5,12H,6-9H2,1H3; Key:VNZLQLYBRIOLFZ-UHFFFAOYSA-N

ortho-Methoxyphenylpiperazine (oMeOPP), also known as 2-methoxyphenylpiperazine (2-MeOPP), is a phenylpiperazine derivative which is known to act as a serotonergic agent. Along with various other phenylpiperazines, like benzylpiperazine (BZP) and trifluoromethylphenylpiperazine (TFMPP), oMeOPP has been found in illicit drug samples.

== Pharmacology ==
The drug has been found to have high affinity for the serotonin 5-HT_{1A} receptor, where it acts as a partial agonist (E_{max} ≈ 70%), but shows no affinity for the serotonin 5-HT_{2} receptor or the dopamine receptors. This is in contrast to the related drug meta-chlorophenylpiperazine (mCPP), which shows high affinity for both the serotonin 5-HT_{1A} and 5-HT_{2} receptors.

oMeOPP and mCPP have both been found to suppress conditioned avoidance responses (CARs) without markedly affecting escape behavior in animals, indicative that they have antipsychotic-like effects. The serotonin receptor antagonist metergoline reversed the suppression of CARs by mCPP but not by oMeOPP. oMeOPP also reversed amphetamine-induced stereotypy in animals, whereas mCPP did not do so. The suppression of CARs by oMeOPP may be mediated by serotonin 5-HT_{1A} receptor activation.

In contrast to other related phenylpiperazines, which are known to act as monoamine releasing agents and/or reuptake inhibitors, the activities of oMeOPP at the monoamine transporters do not appear to have been described.

== History ==
oMeOPP was studied in the 1950s as an antihypertensive agent and produced side effects such as drowsiness that could be interpreted as antipsychotic-like.

== Other drugs ==
oMeOPP has been said to be a metabolite of a variety of drugs including dropropizine, enciprazine, milipertine, MJ-7378, oxypertine, and urapidil. Certain other drugs, such as solypertine, also contain oMeOPP within their chemical structures. However, subsequent research found that oMeOPP is not a metabolite of enciprazine.

== See also ==
- Substituted piperazine
