= N-Isobutylhexedrone =

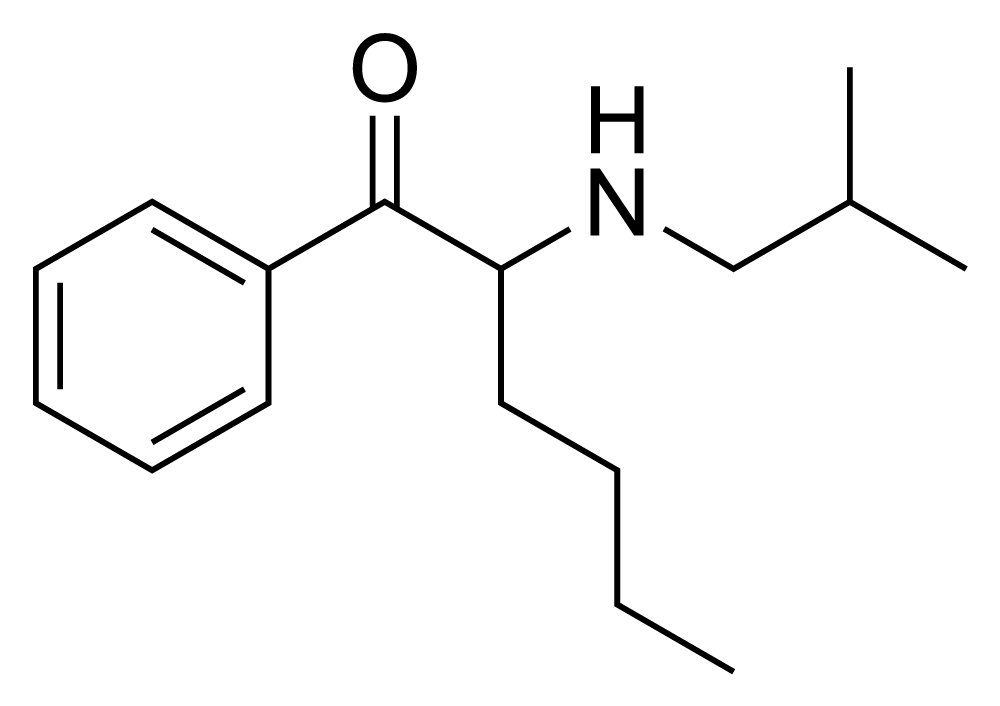

Identifiers
- IUPAC name: 2-(2-methylpropylamino)-1-phenylhexan-1-one
- PubChem CID: 165361567

Chemical and physical data
- Formula: C_{16}H_{25}NO
- Molar mass: 247.382 g·mol^{−1}
- 3D model (JSmol): Interactive image
- SMILES: CCC(C(=O)C1=CC2=C(C=C1)OCO2)NC(C)C
- InChI: InChI=1S/C16H25NO/c1-4-5-11-15(17-12-13(2)3)16(18)14-9-7-6-8-10-14/h6-10,13,15,17H,4-5,11-12H2,1-3H3; Key:XGMYZLXQTQQDHN-UHFFFAOYSA-N

N-Isobutylhexedrone (NDH, α-Isobutylaminohexanophenone) is a recreational designer drug from the substituted cathinone family, with stimulant effects. It was first identified in 2019 along with a number of similar compounds such as N-butylhexedrone and N-isopropylpentedrone, following increasing international controls on the closely related compound N-ethylhexedrone which had seen widespread usage from around 2016 onwards before being banned in a number of countries.

== See also ==
- Substituted cathinone
- Isohexylone
- N-Ethylhexylone
- N-Ethylheptedrone
- N-Cyclohexylmethylone
- N-Isopropylbutylone
