= UCD0830 =

Clinical data
- Other names: UCD-0830; N,N-Dimethyl-2-aminotetralin; N,N-DiMe-2-AT
- Drug class: Serotonin 5-HT_{2C} receptor agonist
- ATC code: None

Identifiers
- IUPAC name: N,N-dimethyl-1,2,3,4-tetrahydronaphthalen-2-amine
- CAS Number: 6945-44-4
- PubChem CID: 242461
- ChemSpider: 211952
- ChEMBL: ChEMBL105131
- CompTox Dashboard (EPA): DTXSID00287450

Chemical and physical data
- Formula: C_{12}H_{17}N
- Molar mass: 175.275 g·mol^{−1}
- 3D model (JSmol): Interactive image
- SMILES: CN(C)C1CCC2=CC=CC=C2C1
- InChI: InChI=1S/C12H17N/c1-13(2)12-8-7-10-5-3-4-6-11(10)9-12/h3-6,12H,7-9H2,1-2H3; Key:WGCDXGZYCIMFTN-UHFFFAOYSA-N

UCD0830, also known as N,N-dimethyl-2-aminotetralin (N,N-DiMe-2-AT), is a serotonin receptor modulator of the 2-aminotetralin family. It is the N,N-dimethyl derivative of 2-aminotetralin (2-AT) and is a cyclized phenethylamine as well as a partial ergoline.

== Pharmacology ==
UCD0830 is a potent partial agonist of the serotonin 5-HT_{2C} receptor, with an EC_{50} of 167 nM and an E_{max} of 52%. It is selective for activation of this receptor over the serotonin 5-HT_{2A} and 5-HT_{2B} receptors, where it shows no significant agonism at concentrations of up to 10,000 nM. However, UCD0830 shows weak but detectable affinity for the serotonin 5-HT_{2A} receptor (K_{i} = 2,290 nM). In accordance with its lack of serotonin 5-HT_{2A} receptor agonism, UCD0830 did not produce the head-twitch response, a behavioral proxy of psychedelic effects, in rodents. Other behavioral effects in animals have also been described.

== Chemistry ==
The chemical synthesis of UCD0830 has been described.

== History ==
UCD0830 was first described in the scientific literature by 1980. Subsequently, it was studied and described in greater detail by David E. Olson and colleagues at the University of California, Davis in 2026.

== See also ==
- Substituted 2-aminotetralin
- Cyclized phenethylamine
- Partial ergoline
- UCD0829
- MDMAT
