= Amine N-methyltransferase =

Class of enzymes

amine N-methyltransferase
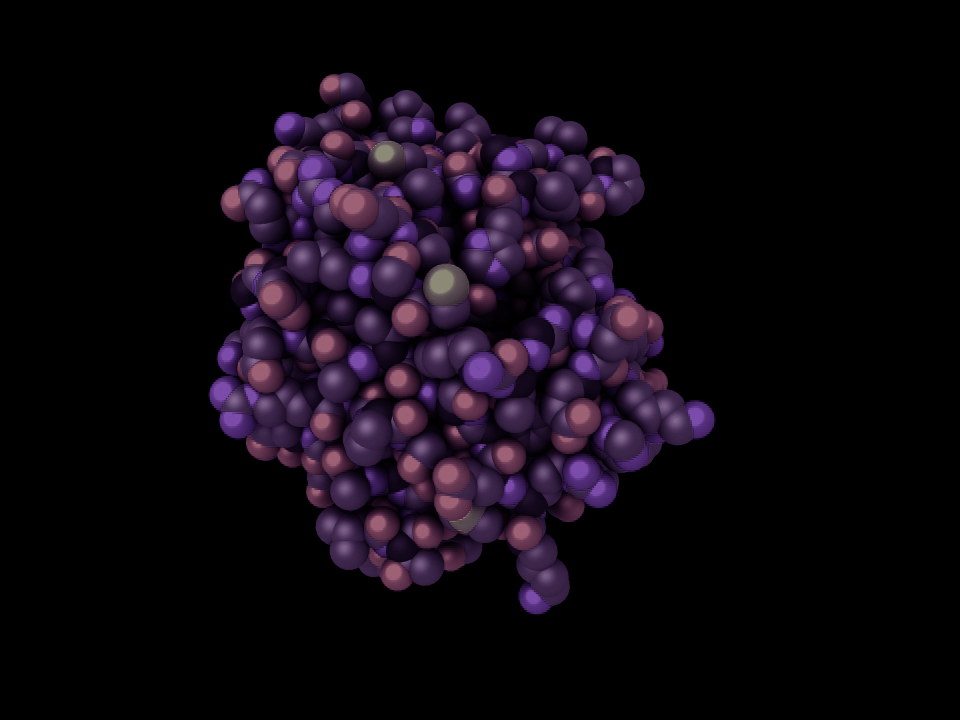
- indolethylamine N-methyltransferase (with slight variation on CPK coloration) – See PDB 2A14

Identifiers
- EC no.: 2.1.1.49
- CAS no.: 51377-47-0

Databases
- BRENDA: enzyme data
- ExPASy: NiceZyme view
- KEGG: enzyme entry
- MetaCyc: metabolic pathway
- Rhea: reactions
- PDB structures: RCSB PDB PDBe PDBsum
- Gene Ontology: AmiGO / QuickGO
Search
- PMC: articles
- PubMed: articles
- NCBI: proteins

INMT

Identifiers
- Aliases: INMT, TEMT, indolethylamine N-methyltransferase
- External IDs: OMIM: 604854; MGI: 102963; GeneCards: INMT
Available structures
PDB	Ortholog search: PDBe RCSB
PDB	List of PDB id codes 2A14
Enzyme activity
EC #	BRENDA	ExPASy	KEGG	MetaCyc
2.1.1.49	↗	↗	↗	↗
2.1.1.96	↗	↗	↗	↗

Gene location (Human)
Chr.	Chromosome 7 (human)
Band	7p14.3	Start	30,697,985 bp
Band	7p14.3	End	30,757,602 bp

Gene location (Mouse)
Chr.	Chromosome 6 (mouse)
Band	6|6 B3	Start	55,147,611 bp
Band	6|6 B3	End	55,152,028 bp
RNA expression pattern
Bgee	Human / Mouse (ortholog); Top expressed in: right lung; upper lobe of left lung; right coronary artery; left coronary artery; cardiac muscle tissue of right atrium; right auricle of heart; apex of heart; right adrenal gland; right adrenal cortex; left adrenal cortex / Top expressed in: right lung lobe; right kidney; left lobe of liver; olfactory epithelium; carotid body; human kidney; tunica adventitia of aorta; left lung; choroid plexus of fourth ventricle; intercostal muscle; More reference expression data
BioGPS	n/a
Gene ontology
Molecular function	amine N-methyltransferase activity; methyltransferase activity; transferase activity; thioether S-methyltransferase activity; protein binding; S-adenosyl-L-methionine:beta-alanine N-methyltransferase activity
Cellular component	cytoplasm; cytosol
Biological process	methylation; amine metabolic process; response to toxic substance
Sources:Amigo / QuickGO
Orthologs
Databases	NCBI: entry; OMA: entry
Species	Human	Mouse
Entrez	11185	21743
Ensembl	ENSG00000241644	ENSMUSG00000003477
UniProt	O95050	P40936
RefSeq (mRNA)	NM_006774; NM_001199219	NM_009349
RefSeq (protein)	NP_001186148; NP_006765	NP_033375
Location (UCSC)	Chr 7: 30.7 – 30.76 Mb	Chr 6: 55.15 – 55.15 Mb
PubMed search
- Wikidata
View/Edit Human	View/Edit Mouse

Amine N-methyltransferase (EC 2.1.1.49), also called indolethylamine N-methyltransferase, and thioether S-methyltransferase, is an enzyme that in humans is encoded by the INMT gene. It is ubiquitously present in non-neural tissues and catalyzes the N-methylation of tryptamine and structurally related compounds. It can also catalyze the methylation of thioether and selenoether compounds, although the physiological significance of this biotransformation is not yet known.

The general reaction taking place is:

S-adenosyl-L-methionine + an amine $\rightleftharpoons$ S-adenosyl-L-homocysteine + a methylated amine

== Function ==
Important reactions known to be catalysed by the enzyme include the dimethylation of tryptamine and serotonin, which are transformed to N,N-dimethyltryptamine (DMT) and bufotenine respectively, for example:

serotonin
+ 2 SAM
bufotenin
+ 2 SAH

A wide range of primary, secondary and tertiary amines can act as substrates, including tryptamine, aniline, nicotine and a variety of drugs and other xenobiotics.

The enzyme can also transfer methyl groups to atoms other than nitrogen, for example sulfur and selenium.

== Nomenclature ==
This enzyme belongs to the family of transferases, specifically those transferring one-carbon group methyltransferases. The systematic name of this enzyme class is S-adenosyl-L-methionine:amine N-methyltransferase. Other names in common use include nicotine N-methyltransferase, tryptamine N-methyltransferase, indolethylamine N-methyltransferase, and arylamine N-methyltransferase.

== Structural studies ==
As of late 2007, only one structure has been solved for this class of enzymes, with the PDB accession code PDB: 2A14.
