= Carmoxirole =

Clinical data
- Other names: EMD-45609; EMD45609
- Routes of administration: Oral
- Drug class: Dopamine D_{2} receptor agonist; Antihypertensive agent
- ATC code: None

Identifiers
- IUPAC name: 3-[4-(4-phenyl-3,6-dihydro-2H-pyridin-1-yl)butyl]-1H-indole-5-carboxylic acid
- CAS Number: 98323-83-2
- PubChem CID: 57364
- ChemSpider: 51715
- UNII: MRP4P457ZA
- ChEBI: CHEBI:64200
- ChEMBL: ChEMBL70159
- CompTox Dashboard (EPA): DTXSID0043892

Chemical and physical data
- Formula: C_{24}H_{26}N_{2}O_{2}
- Molar mass: 374.484 g·mol^{−1}
- 3D model (JSmol): Interactive image
- SMILES: C1CN(CC=C1C2=CC=CC=C2)CCCCC3=CNC4=C3C=C(C=C4)C(=O)O
- InChI: InChI=1S/C24H26N2O2/c27-24(28)20-9-10-23-22(16-20)21(17-25-23)8-4-5-13-26-14-11-19(12-15-26)18-6-2-1-3-7-18/h1-3,6-7,9-11,16-17,25H,4-5,8,12-15H2,(H,27,28); Key:AFSOIHMEOKEZJF-UHFFFAOYSA-N

Carmoxirole (INN; developmental code name EMD-45609) is a dopamine D_{2} receptor agonist which was developed as a potential antihypertensive and heart failure medication but was never marketed. It is taken orally.

== Pharmacology ==
Carmoxirole is a potent, selective, and peripherally restricted partial agonist of the dopamine D_{2} receptor. It showed about 1,000-fold higher affinity for the dopamine D_{2} receptor over the dopamine D_{1} receptor. Carmoxirole also showed some affinity for the serotonin 5-HT_{1A} receptor and for the α_{2}-adrenergic receptor, whereas affinity for other receptors like the serotonin 5-HT_{2}, α_{1}-adrenergic, and β-adrenergic receptors was negligible.

The drug has been found to reverse hyperprolactinemia induced by the dopamine D_{2} receptor antagonist amisulpride without producing central effects in rats. It has also been found to reduce circulating norepinephrine levels by 55% in people with severe heart failure, an action thought to be mediated by its dopamine D_{2} receptor agonism in the periphery. This depression in norepinephrine levels was accompanied by improvements in cardiovascular parameters.

== Chemistry ==
Carmoxirole is an indole derivative and shows similarities in its chemical structure to tryptamines and pertines like oxypertine but has an elongated alkyl side chain and hence does not belong to these groups itself.

== History ==
Carmoxirole was first described in the scientific literature by 1988. It is based on the indolyl-3-butylamine framework, a class of dopamine receptor agonists.

== See also ==
- Pertine
- 5-Carboxamidotryptamine
- Roxindole
- Sertindole
- Tepirindole
- Iprindole
- Nolomirole
