= B-193 =

Clinical data
- Other names: B193; 9-Methyl-2-(3-(4-phenyl-1-piperazinyl)propyl)-2,3,4,9-tetrahydro-1H-β-carbolin-1-one
- Drug class: Serotonin receptor modulator; Serotonin 5-HT_{2A} receptor antagonist
- ATC code: None

Identifiers
- IUPAC name: 9-methyl-2-[3-(4-phenylpiperazin-1-yl)propyl]-3,4-dihydropyrido[3,4-b]indol-1-one
- CAS Number: 142944-39-6
- PubChem CID: 130272
- ChemSpider: 115274
- ChEMBL: ChEMBL2008354

Chemical and physical data
- Formula: C_{25}H_{30}N_{4}O
- Molar mass: 402.542 g·mol^{−1}
- 3D model (JSmol): Interactive image
- SMILES: CN1C2=CC=CC=C2C3=C1C(=O)N(CC3)CCCN4CCN(CC4)C5=CC=CC=C5
- InChI: InChI=1S/C25H30N4O/c1-26-23-11-6-5-10-21(23)22-12-15-29(25(30)24(22)26)14-7-13-27-16-18-28(19-17-27)20-8-3-2-4-9-20/h2-6,8-11H,7,12-19H2,1H3; Key:RYHQBVCKCSNVHZ-UHFFFAOYSA-N

B-193 is a serotonin 5-HT_{2} receptor antagonist of the β-carboline family. It shows affinity for serotonin 5-HT_{2} and α_{1}-adrenergic receptors and much lower affinity for serotonin 5-HT_{1} and α_{2}-adrenergic receptors. The drug also inhibits serotonin-induced contractions in the rat fundus stomach strip. Conversely, it does not inhibit serotonin or norepinephrine reuptake.

B-193 reverses the effects of various serotonergic agents in animals, such as the head-twitch response induced by 5-HTP and LSD and the hyperthermia induced by fenfluramine and mCPP, among various others. On the other hand, it does not influence effects of most dopaminergic agents, including reserpine, levodopa, and apomorphine, though it did enhance amphetamine-induced hyperlocomotion. The drug produces antidepressant-like effects in rodents and was regarded as having the profile of an atypical antidepressant. The toxicity of B-193 has been studied.

B-193 was first described in the scientific literature by 1989.

== See also ==
- Substituted β-carboline
- Pertine
