= Solypertine =

Abandoned sympatholytic drug

Clinical data
- Other names: Solipertine; WIN18413; WIN-18,413; Win-18413; WIN 18413-2
- ATC code: None

Identifiers
- IUPAC name: 7-[2-[4-(2-methoxyphenyl)piperazin-1-yl]ethyl]-5H-[1,3]dioxolo[4,5-f]indole
- CAS Number: 4448-96-8 5591-43-5 (tartrate)
- PubChem CID: 20517
- ChemSpider: 19323
- UNII: 9BUF6DCO0C
- ChEMBL: ChEMBL1739674
- CompTox Dashboard (EPA): DTXSID50196189

Chemical and physical data
- Formula: C_{22}H_{25}N_{3}O_{3}
- Molar mass: 379.460 g·mol^{−1}
- 3D model (JSmol): Interactive image
- SMILES: COC1=CC=CC=C1N2CCN(CC2)CCC3=CNC4=CC5=C(C=C43)OCO5
- InChI: InChI=1S/C22H25N3O3/c1-26-20-5-3-2-4-19(20)25-10-8-24(9-11-25)7-6-16-14-23-18-13-22-21(12-17(16)18)27-15-28-22/h2-5,12-14,23H,6-11,15H2,1H3; Key:GIWODWVYEOAGQV-UHFFFAOYSA-N

Solypertine (INN; developmental code name WIN-18413), also known as solypertine tartrate (USAN) in the case of the tartrate salt, is a drug of the pertine group described as an antiadrenergic (or adrenolytic/sympatholytic) and as also potentially possessing neuroleptic properties which was never marketed.

Structurally, it is a substituted tryptamine and a piperazinylethylindole. The drug is closely structurally related to other "pertines" including alpertine, milipertine, and oxypertine, which are also tryptamines and piperazinylethylindoles. Solypertine can be synthesized from 5,6-methylenedioxyindole.

The related drug oxypertine shows high affinity for the serotonin 5-HT_{2} and dopamine D_{2} receptors (K_{i} = 8.6 nM and 30 nM, respectively) and is also known to act as a catecholamine depleting agent. Oxypertine, milipertine, and solypertine all antagonize the behavioral effects of tryptamine, a serotonin receptor agonist, and apomorphine, a dopamine receptor agonist, in animals. ortho-Methoxyphenylpiperazine (oMeOPP) has been said to be a metabolite of milipertine and oxypertine.

Solypertine was first described in the scientific literature by 1962.

== See also ==
- Pertine
- NBOMe
