= Benzedrone =

Chemical compound

Clinical data
- ATC code: none

Legal status
- Legal status: DE: NpSG (Industrial and scientific use only); UK: Class B

Identifiers
- IUPAC name: (±)-1-(4-methylphenyl)-2-(benzylamino)propan-1-one
- CAS Number: 1225617-75-3
- PubChem CID: 57493771
- ChemSpider: 25630094
- UNII: V6Z5G5VE87
- CompTox Dashboard (EPA): DTXSID401017094

Chemical and physical data
- Formula: C_{17}H_{19}NO
- Molar mass: 253.345 g·mol^{−1}
- 3D model (JSmol): Interactive image
- SMILES: c2ccccc2CNC(C)C(=O)c(cc1)ccc1C
- InChI: InChI=1S/C17H19NO/c1-13-8-10-16(11-9-13)17(19)14(2)18-12-15-6-4-3-5-7-15/h3-11,14,18H,12H2,1-2H3; Key:KWHZRPBDEAQYDE-UHFFFAOYSA-N

Benzedrone (4-MBC) is a designer drug which has been found since 2010 as an ingredient in a number of "bath salt" mixes sold as recreational drugs.

== See also ==
- Substituted cathinone
- Benzphetamine
- Benzylone
- Cyputylone
- 4-MEC
- Mephedrone
