= Milipertine =

Abandoned antipsychotic

Clinical data
- Other names: Millipertine; WIN18935; WIN-18,935; Win-18935

Identifiers
- IUPAC name: 5,6-dimethoxy-3-[2-[4-(2-methoxyphenyl)piperazin-1-yl]ethyl]-2-methyl-1H-indole
- CAS Number: 24360-55-2
- PubChem CID: 32345
- ChemSpider: 29982
- UNII: WX1V67H28T
- KEGG: D02673
- ChEMBL: ChEMBL2105252
- CompTox Dashboard (EPA): DTXSID00179104

Chemical and physical data
- Formula: C_{24}H_{31}N_{3}O_{3}
- Molar mass: 409.530 g·mol^{−1}
- 3D model (JSmol): Interactive image
- SMILES: CC1=C(C2=CC(=C(C=C2N1)OC)OC)CCN3CCN(CC3)C4=CC=CC=C4OC
- InChI: InChI=1S/C24H31N3O3/c1-17-18(19-15-23(29-3)24(30-4)16-20(19)25-17)9-10-26-11-13-27(14-12-26)21-7-5-6-8-22(21)28-2/h5-8,15-16,25H,9-14H2,1-4H3; Key:XYAANYFFYIRFND-UHFFFAOYSA-N

Milipertine (INN, USAN; developmental code name WIN-18935) is a drug of the pertine group described as an antipsychotic, neuroleptic, and tranquilizer which was under development for the treatment of schizophrenia but was never marketed.

Structurally, it is a substituted tryptamine and a piperazinylethylindole. The drug is closely structurally related to other "pertines" including alpertine, oxypertine, and solypertine, which are also tryptamines and piperazinylethylindoles.

The related drug oxypertine shows high affinity for the serotonin 5-HT_{2} and dopamine D_{2} receptors (K_{i} = 8.6 nM and 30 nM, respectively) and is also known to act as a catecholamine depleting agent. Oxypertine, milipertine, and solypertine all antagonize the behavioral effects of tryptamine, a serotonin receptor agonist, and apomorphine, a dopamine receptor agonist, in animals. ortho-Methoxyphenylpiperazine (oMeOPP) has been said to be a metabolite of milipertine, as well as of oxypertine and several other drugs.

Milipertine produced troublesome side effects in clinical studies including orthostatic hypotension, drowsiness, extrapyramidal symptoms, elevated liver enzymes, and weight loss. The side effects of milipertine occurred too frequently and at doses well below those producing antipsychotic effects and its development was abandoned.

Milipertine was first described in the scientific literature by 1968.

== See also ==
- Pertine
- NBOMe
