= Pertine =

Oxypertine, the most well-known drug of the pertine group.

The pertines, also known as phenylpiperazinylethylindoles, are a group of antipsychotics of the cyclized tryptamine and phenylpiperazine families that includes the following drugs:

- Alpertine (WIN-31665)
- Milipertine (WIN-18935)
- Oxypertine (WIN-18501)
- Solypertine (WIN-18413)

Oxypertine is known to show high affinity for the serotonin 5-HT_{2} and dopamine D_{2} receptors (K_{i} = 8.6 nM and 30 nM, respectively) and to also act as a catecholamine depleting agent. Oxypertine, milipertine, and solypertine all antagonize the behavioral effects of tryptamine, a serotonin receptor agonist, and apomorphine, a dopamine receptor agonist, in animals.

Some of the pertines, like milipertine and solypertine, are notable in containing an NBOMe-like moiety.

The pertines were developed and initially described in the 1960s and 1970s.

Chemical structures of pertines
Alpertine

Milipertine

Oxypertine

Solypertine

== See also ==
- Cyclized tryptamine
- 5-MeO-T-NBOMe
- N-Benzyltryptamine
- Carmoxirole
- B-193
