= UCD0829 =

Clinical data
- Other names: UCD-0829
- Drug class: Serotonin 5-HT_{2C} receptor agonist
- ATC code: None

Identifiers
- IUPAC name: N,N-dimethyl-4,5,6,7-tetrahydro-2H-isoindol-5-amine
- PubChem CID: 23463961

Chemical and physical data
- Formula: C_{10}H_{16}N_{2}
- Molar mass: 164.252 g·mol^{−1}
- 3D model (JSmol): Interactive image
- SMILES: CN(C)C1CCC2=CNC=C2C1
- InChI: InChI=1S/C10H16N2/c1-12(2)10-4-3-8-6-11-7-9(8)5-10/h6-7,10-11H,3-5H2,1-2H3; Key:RGEMPCYKTLPDNB-UHFFFAOYSA-N

UCD0829, also known as N,N-dimethyl-4,5,6,7-tetrahydro-2H-isoindol-5-amine, is a serotonin 5-HT_{2C} receptor agonist and a partial ergoline. It showed no affinity for nor agonism of the serotonin 5-HT_{2A} and 5-HT_{2B} receptors. On the other hand, UCD0829 was a low-potency, moderate-efficacy partial agonist of the serotonin 5-HT_{2C} receptor, with an EC_{50} of 1,660 nM and an E_{max} of 43%. In accordance with its lack of serotonin 5-HT_{2A} receptor agonism, UCD0829 failed to produce the head-twitch response, a behavioral proxy of psychedelic effects, in rodents. The chemical synthesis of UCD0829 has been described. UCD0829 was first described in the scientific literature by David E. Olson and colleagues by 2026.

== See also ==
- Partial ergoline
- UCD0830 (N,N-DiMe-2-AT)
