= Butidrine =

Chemical compound

Clinical data
- Trade names: Betabloc, Butidrate, Recetan
- Other names: Butedrine; Butydrine; Hydrobutamine; Idrobutamine
- Drug class: Beta blocker

Identifiers
- IUPAC name: 2-(butan-2-ylamino)-1-(5,6,7,8-tetrahydronaphthalen-2-yl)ethanol
- CAS Number: 7433-10-5
- PubChem CID: 15177
- ChemSpider: 14445
- UNII: N2S0PKP5L5
- ChEBI: CHEBI:135008
- ChEMBL: ChEMBL358930
- CompTox Dashboard (EPA): DTXSID40864062

Chemical and physical data
- Formula: C_{16}H_{25}NO
- Molar mass: 247.382 g·mol^{−1}
- 3D model (JSmol): Interactive image
- SMILES: CCC(C)NCC(C1=CC2=C(CCCC2)C=C1)O
- InChI: InChI=1S/C16H25NO/c1-3-12(2)17-11-16(18)15-9-8-13-6-4-5-7-14(13)10-15/h8-10,12,16-18H,3-7,11H2,1-2H3; Key:GVNYSERWAKVROD-UHFFFAOYSA-N

Butidrine (INN), sold under the brand names Betabloc, Butidrate, and Recetan among others, is a beta blocker (or β-adrenergic receptor antagonist) related to pronethalol and propranolol that was developed in the 1960s. It is not cardioselective (i.e., is not selective for the β_{1}-adrenergic receptor over the β_{2}-adrenergic receptor). It has membrane stabilizing activity but no intrinsic sympathomimetic activity (i.e., partial agonist activity). Similarly to certain other beta blockers, butidrine additionally possesses local anesthetic properties.
