= N-Cyclohexylmethylone =

Chemical compound

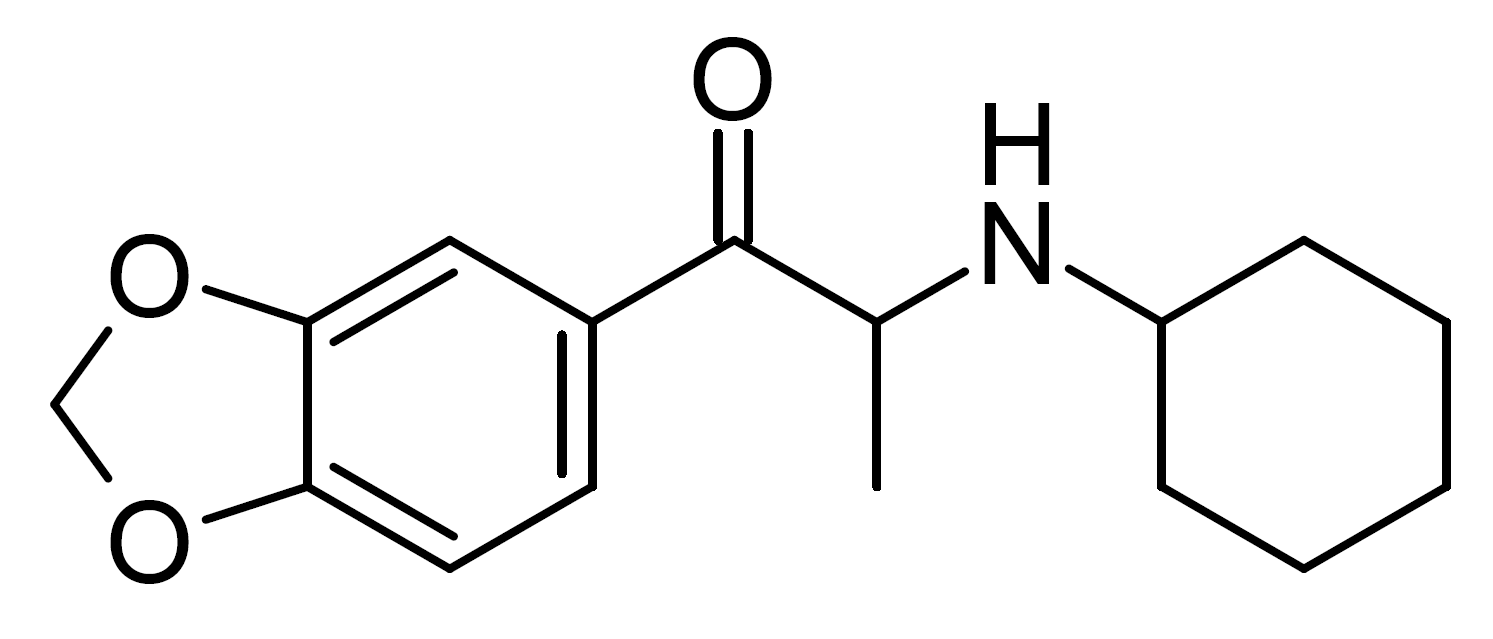

Clinical data
- Other names: Cybutylone

Legal status
- Legal status: DE: Anlage II (Authorized trade only, not prescriptible); UK: Class B; US: Unscheduled, schedule I in Virginia

Identifiers
- IUPAC name: 1-(Benzo[d][1,3]dioxol-5-yl)-2-(cyclohexylamino)propan-1-one
- PubChem CID: 164946391
- ChemSpider: 128918008
- UNII: AB5UNF3WUF
- CompTox Dashboard (EPA): DTXSID601344946

Chemical and physical data
- Formula: C_{16}H_{21}NO_{3}
- Molar mass: 275.348 g·mol^{−1}
- 3D model (JSmol): Interactive image
- SMILES: CC(C(=O)C1=CC2=C(C=C1)OCO2)NC3CCCCC3
- InChI: InChI=1S/C16H21NO3/c1-11(17-13-5-3-2-4-6-13)16(18)12-7-8-14-15(9-12)20-10-19-14/h7-9,11,13,17H,2-6,10H2,1H3; Key:WZDQUORQDHVTKD-UHFFFAOYSA-N

N-Cyclohexylmethylone (cyputylone) is a substituted cathinone derivative with stimulant effects which has been sold as a designer drug. It was first identified in the United States in 2022.

== See also ==
- Methylone
- Ethylone
- Benzedrone
