= Oxypertine =

Antipsychotic medication

Clinical data
- Trade names: Oxypertine, others
- Other names: WIN-18501; WIN18501; WIN-18,501, Win-18501; Win-18501-2
- AHFS/Drugs.com: International Drug Names
- Routes of administration: By mouth
- Drug class: Monoamine-depleting agent, antipsychotic, anxiolytic
- ATC code: N05AE01 (WHO)

Legal status
- Legal status: BR: Class C1 (Other controlled substances); In general: ℞ (Prescription only)

Identifiers
- IUPAC name: 5,6-Dimethoxy-2-methyl-3-[2-(4-phenylpiperazin-1-yl)ethyl]-1H-indole
- CAS Number: 153-87-7
- PubChem CID: 4640
- ChemSpider: 4479
- UNII: 5JGL4G25R7
- KEGG: D01219
- CompTox Dashboard (EPA): DTXSID20165185
- ECHA InfoCard: 100.005.291

Chemical and physical data
- Formula: C_{23}H_{29}N_{3}O_{2}
- Molar mass: 379.504 g·mol^{−1}
- 3D model (JSmol): Interactive image
- SMILES: CC1=C(C2=CC(=C(C=C2N1)OC)OC)CCN3CCN(CC3)C4=CC=CC=C4
- InChI: InChI=1S/C23H29N3O2/c1-17-19(20-15-22(27-2)23(28-3)16-21(20)24-17)9-10-25-11-13-26(14-12-25)18-7-5-4-6-8-18/h4-8,15-16,24H,9-14H2,1-3H3; Key:XCWPUUGSGHNIDZ-UHFFFAOYSA-N

Oxypertine, sold under the brand name Oxypertine among others, is an antipsychotic medication of the pertine group which was previously used in the treatment of schizophrenia but is no longer marketed. It was also evaluated for the treatment of anxiety.

== Pharmacology ==
=== Pharmacodynamics ===
The drug shows high affinity for the serotonin 5-HT_{2} and dopamine D_{2} receptors (K_{i} = 8.6 nM and 30 nM, respectively). It antagonizes the behavioral effects of tryptamine, a serotonin receptor agonist, and apomorphine, a dopamine receptor agonist, in animals. Like reserpine and tetrabenazine, oxypertine depletes catecholamines, though not serotonin, possibly contributing to its antipsychotic effectiveness.

== Chemistry ==
Chemically, it is a substituted tryptamine and phenylpiperazine derivative. Its chemical structure is similar to other "pertines" including alpertine, milipertine, and solypertine.

== History ==
Oxypertine was first described in the scientific literature by 1962.

== Society and culture ==
=== Names ===
Oxypertine is the generic name of the drug and its INN, USAN, BAN, DCF, and JAN. It is also known by its former developmental code name WIN-18501. The drug has been sold under brand names including Equipertine, Forit, Integrin, Lanturil, Lotawin, Opertil, and Oxypertine.

== See also ==
- Pertine
