= 5-OH-DPAT =

Dopamine receptor agonist compound

- Stereo, Kekulé, skeletal formula of (S)-5-OH-DPAT

Names
- Preferred IUPAC name (6S)-6-(Dipropylamino)-5,6,7,8-tetrahydronaphthalen-1-ol

Identifiers
CAS Number	68593-96-4
3D model (JSmol)	Interactive image; Interactive image; Interactive image
Abbreviations	5-OH-DPAT
ChEMBL	ChEMBL273273
ChemSpider	9474597 (S); 150564
MeSH	5-Hydroxy-2-N,N-dipropylaminotetralin
PubChem CID	11299620 (S); 12280580 (R); 172267
CompTox Dashboard (EPA)	DTXSID801336109
- InChI: InChI=1S/C16H25NO/c1-3-10-17(11-4-2)14-8-9-15-13(12-14)6-5-7-16(15)18/h5-7,14,18H,3-4,8-12H2,1-2H3/t14-/m0/s1 Key: MDBWEQVKJDMEMK-AWEZNQCLSA-N
- SMILES: Oc1cccc2c1CC[C@H](N(CCC)CCC)C2; CCCN(CCC)C1CCc2c(O)cccc2C1; CCCN(CCC)C1CCC2=C(O)C=CC=C2C1

Properties
Chemical formula	C_{16}H_{25}NO
Molar mass	247.382 g·mol^{−1}
log P	3.55
Acidity (pK_{a})	10.543
Basicity (pK_{b})	3.454
- Except where otherwise noted, data are given for materials in their standard state (at 25 °C [77 °F], 100 kPa). verify (what is ?) Infobox references

5-OH-DPAT is a synthetic compound that acts as a dopamine receptor agonist with selectivity for the D_{2} receptor and D_{3} receptor subtypes. Only the (S)-enantiomer is active as an agonist, with the (R)-enantiomer being a weak antagonist at D_{2} receptors. Radiolabelled ^{11}C-5-OH-DPAT is used as an agonist radioligand for mapping the distribution and function of D_{2} and D_{3} receptors in the brain, and the drug is also being studied in the treatment of Parkinson's disease.

== See also ==
- 7-OH-DPAT
- 8-OH-DPAT
