= 7-OH-DPAT =

Dopamine receptor agonist compound

- Kekulé, skeletal formula of 7-OH-DPAT

Names
- IUPAC name 7-Hydroxy-N,N-dipropyl-2-aminotetralin
- Systematic IUPAC name 7-(Dipropylamino)-5,6,7,8-tetrahydronaphthalen-2-ol

Identifiers
| CAS Number | 74938-11-7 |
| 3D model (JSmol) | Interactive image; Interactive image |
| Abbreviations | 7-OH-DPAT |
| ChEMBL | ChEMBL285755 |
| ChemSpider | 1182; 5036175 (R) |
| IUPHAR/BPS | 950 |
| MeSH | 7-Hydroxy-2-N,N-dipropylaminotetralin |
| PubChem CID | 1219; 6603867 (R); 23928184 (S) |
| UNII | RR7D75YDF4 |
| CompTox Dashboard (EPA) | DTXSID00874864 |
- InChI: InChI=1S/C16H25NO/c1-3-9-17(10-4-2)15-7-5-13-6-8-16(18)12-14(13)11-15/h6,8,12,15,18H,3-5,7,9-11H2,1-2H3 Key: BLYMJBIZMIGWFK-UHFFFAOYSA-N; InChI=1/C16H25NO/c1-3-9-17(10-4-2)15-7-5-13-6-8-16(18)12-14(13)11-15/h6,8,12,15,18H,3-5,7,9-11H2,1-2H3 Key: BLYMJBIZMIGWFK-UHFFFAOYAH
- SMILES: CCCN(CCC)C1CCc2ccc(O)cc2C1; CCCN(CCC)C1CCC2=C(C1)C=C(O)C=C2

Properties
| Chemical formula | C_{16}H_{25}NO |
| Molar mass | 247.382 g·mol^{−1} |
| log P | 3.653 |
| Acidity (pK_{a}) | 10.389 |
| Basicity (pK_{b}) | 3.608 |
- Except where otherwise noted, data are given for materials in their standard state (at 25 °C [77 °F], 100 kPa). verify (what is ?) Infobox references

7-OH-DPAT is a synthetic compound that acts as a dopamine receptor agonist with reasonable selectivity for the D_{3} receptor subtype, and low affinity for serotonin receptors, unlike its structural isomer 8-OH-DPAT. 7-OH-DPAT is self-administered in several animal models, and is used to study its addiction effects to cocaine.

== See also ==
- 5-OH-DPAT
- 8-OH-DPAT
- PD-128,907
- Rotigotine
- UH-232
