= C15H20N2O =

The molecular formula C_{15}H_{20}N_{2}O may refer to:

- Anagyrine
- 4,5-DHP-DMT
- 1-(2-Dimethylaminoethyl)dihydropyrano(3,2-e)indole
- 5-MeO-MALT
- 5-MeO-MPMI
- 5-MeO-pyr-T
- Ro60-0213
