= C14H18N2O =

The molecular formula C_{14}H_{18}N_{2}O may refer to:

- AL-37350A, a tryptamine derivative
- 5-Allyloxy-AMT
- BRL-54443, agonist of 5-HT1E and 5-HT1F serotonin receptors
- CP-132,484, a tryptamine derivative
- 4-HO-pyr-T, a tryptamine derivative
- 4-HO-McPT, a tryptamine derivative
- Ibudilast, an antiinflammatory drug
- Propyphenazone, an analgesic
- Tabernanthalog
- 6-MeO-RU-28306
