= MPMI (drug) =

Chemical compound

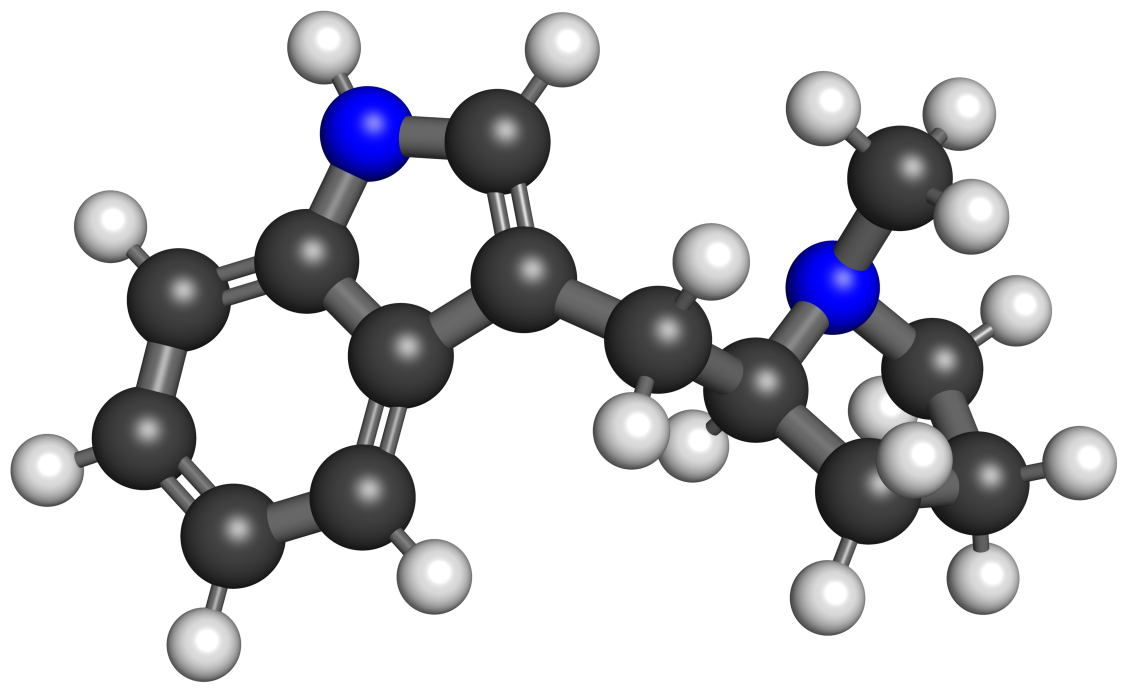

Clinical data
- Other names: 3-(N-Methylpyrrolidin-3-ylmethyl)indole; N-Methyl-α,N-trimethylenetryptamine; α,N-Trimethylene-N-methyltryptamine
- Drug class: Serotonin receptor agonist

Identifiers
- IUPAC name: 3-[(1-methylpyrrolidin-2-yl)methyl]-1H-indole
- CAS Number: 143321-54-4 143322-55-8 (R enantiomer)
- PubChem CID: 53870442
- ChemSpider: 68007055

Chemical and physical data
- Formula: C_{14}H_{18}N_{2}
- Molar mass: 214.312 g·mol^{−1}
- 3D model (JSmol): Interactive image
- SMILES: CN1CCCC1CC2=CNC3=CC=CC=C32
- InChI: InChI=1S/C14H18N2/c1-16-8-4-5-12(16)9-11-10-15-14-7-3-2-6-13(11)14/h2-3,6-7,10,12,15H,4-5,8-9H2,1H3; Key:HCTCDEAMCNSARD-UHFFFAOYSA-N

MPMI, also known as 3-(N-methylpyrrolidin-3-ylmethyl)indole or as N-methyl-α,N-trimethylenetryptamine, is a pyrrolidinylmethylindole and cyclized tryptamine which acts as a serotonin receptor agonist. It has been studied as an analogue and trace impurity of the antimigraine drug eletriptan but is otherwise little known.

== Chemistry ==
=== Analogues ===
Analogues of MPMI include 4-HO-MPMI, 5-MeO-MPMI, 5F-MPMI, eletriptan, CP-122288, CP-135807, 10,11-secoergoline (α,N-Pip-T), pyr-T, SN-22, and α,N,N-trimethyltryptamine, among others.

== Society and culture ==
=== Legal status ===
==== Canada ====
MPMI is not a controlled substance in Canada as of 2025.

==== United States ====
MPMI is not an explicitly controlled substance in the United States. However, it could be considered a controlled substance under the Federal Analogue Act if intended for human consumption.

== See also ==
- Pyrrolidinylmethylindole
- Cyclized tryptamine
