= Nor-LSD (disambiguation) =

Ergoline ring system numbered and labeled.

LSD chemical structure.

Nor-LSD, also known as nor-lysergic acid diethylamide, may refer to:

- Nor-LSD (6-nor-LSD)
- NDTDI (9-nor-LSD; 9-desmethine-LSD; 8,10-seco-LSD)
- UCD0179 (4-nor-LSD; 4-desmethylene-LSD; 3,5-seco-LSD)

Other related compounds include:

- N-DEAOP-NMT (N-DECE-NMT; desvinyl-LSD; 9,10-dinor-LSD)
- UCD0120 (dides-B,C-LSD; 1-deaza-2,3,4-trinor-LSD)
- N-DEAOP-NMPEA (PEA-NM-NDEPA; 1-deaza-2,3,4,9-tetranor-LSD)
- 10,11-Seco-LSD (UCD0121)

== See also ==
- Substituted lysergamide
- Partial lysergamide
- Seco-LSD
- Secoergoline
- Des-LSD
