= 5-MeO-MPMI =

Chemical compound

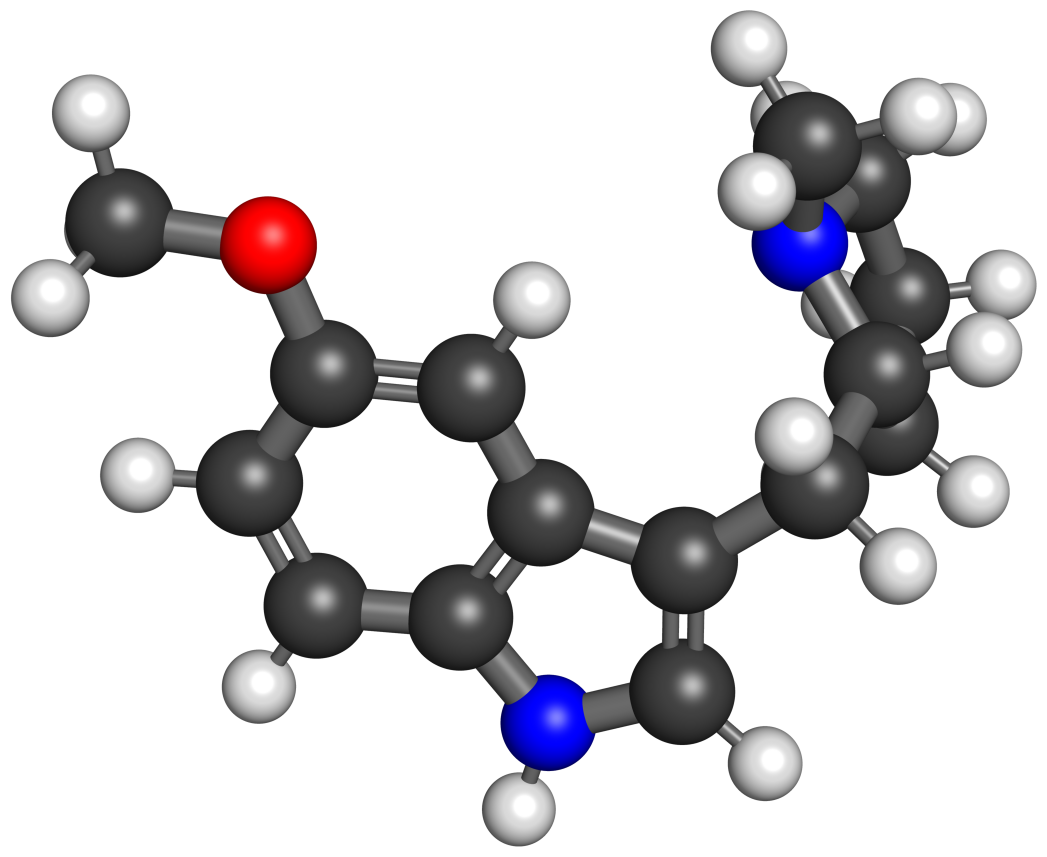

Clinical data
- Other names: 5-Methoxy-N-methyl-(α,N-trimethylene)tryptamine; CP-108509; CP108509
- Drug class: Serotonergic psychedelic; Hallucinogen
- ATC code: None

Legal status
- Legal status: DE: NpSG (Industrial and scientific use only); UK: Class A

Identifiers
- IUPAC name: 5-methoxy-3-[(1-methylpyrrolidin-2-yl)methyl]-1H-indole
- CAS Number: 143321-57-7
- PubChem CID: 10060391
- ChemSpider: 8235945
- UNII: N29TFW7VRV
- ChEMBL: ChEMBL137485
- CompTox Dashboard (EPA): DTXSID401027538

Chemical and physical data
- Formula: C_{15}H_{20}N_{2}O
- Molar mass: 244.338 g·mol^{−1}
- 3D model (JSmol): Interactive image
- SMILES: CN1CCCC1CC2=CNC3=C2C=C(C=C3)OC
- InChI: InChI=1S/C15H20N2O/c1-17-7-3-4-12(17)8-11-10-16-15-6-5-13(18-2)9-14(11)15/h5-6,9-10,12,16H,3-4,7-8H2,1-2H3; Key:MKEGUJPBCIXABO-UHFFFAOYSA-N

5-MeO-MPMI (developmental code name CP-108509), also known as 5-methoxy-N-methyl-(α,N-trimethylene)tryptamine, is a psychedelic drug of the pyrrolidinylmethylindole and cyclized tryptamine families.

== Pharmacology ==
=== Pharmacodynamics ===
(R)-5-MeO-MPMI.

5-MeO-MPMI produces psychedelic-appropriate responding in animal tests, with similar potency to DOI. It has two enantiomers, with only the (R)-enantiomer being active.

== Chemistry ==
=== Analogues ===
Analogues of 5-MeO-MPMI include MPMI, 4-HO-MPMI, 5-fluoro-MPMI, 5-MeO-pyr-T, CP-122288, CP-135807, and eletriptan, among others.

== History ==
5-MeO-MPMI was first developed by the team led by J. E. Macor and colleagues in 1992. It was subsequently investigated by the team led by David E. Nichols from Purdue University in the late 1990s.

== Society and culture ==
=== Legal status ===
==== Canada ====
5-MeO-MPMI is not a controlled substance in Canada as of 2025.

== See also ==
- Pyrrolidinylmethylindole
- Cyclized tryptamine
