= C16H22N2O =

The molecular formula C_{16}H_{22}N_{2}O (molar mass : 258.365 g/mol) may refer to:

- 4-HO-McPeT
- 5-MeO-pip-T
