= CP-122288 =

Chemical compound

Identifiers
- IUPAC name: N-methyl-1-[3-([(2R)-1-methylpyrrolidin-2-yl]methyl)-1H-indol-5-yl]methanesulfonamide
- CAS Number: 143321-74-8
- PubChem CID: 132552
- IUPHAR/BPS: 110
- ChemSpider: 117032
- UNII: 59E9WCT6EM
- CompTox Dashboard (EPA): DTXSID00931820

Chemical and physical data
- Formula: C_{16}H_{23}N_{3}O_{2}S
- Molar mass: 321.44 g·mol^{−1}
- 3D model (JSmol): Interactive image
- SMILES: CNS(=O)(=O)Cc1ccc2c(c1)c(c[nH]2)C[C@H]3CCCN3C
- InChI: InChI=1S/C16H23N3O2S/c1-17-22(20,21)11-12-5-6-16-15(8-12)13(10-18-16)9-14-4-3-7-19(14)2/h5-6,8,10,14,17-18H,3-4,7,9,11H2,1-2H3/t14-/m1/s1; Key:BWQZTHPHLITOOZ-CQSZACIVSA-N

CP-122,288 is a drug of the pyrrolidinylmethylindole family which acts as a potent and selective agonist for the 5-HT_{1B}, 5-HT_{1D} and 5-HT_{1F} serotonin receptor subtypes. It is a derivative of the migraine medication sumatriptan, but while CP-122,288 is 40,000 times more potent than sumatriptan as an inhibitor of neurogenic inflammation and plasma protein extravasation, it is only twice as potent as a constrictor of blood vessels. In human trials, CP-122,288 was not found to be effective as a treatment for migraine, but its selectivity for neurogenic anti-inflammatory action over vasoconstriction has made it useful for research into the underlying causes of migraine.

== See also ==
- Pyrrolidinylmethylindole
- Cyclized tryptamine
- 5-MeO-MPMI
- CP-135807
- Eletriptan
