= 4-HO-MPMI =

Chemical compound

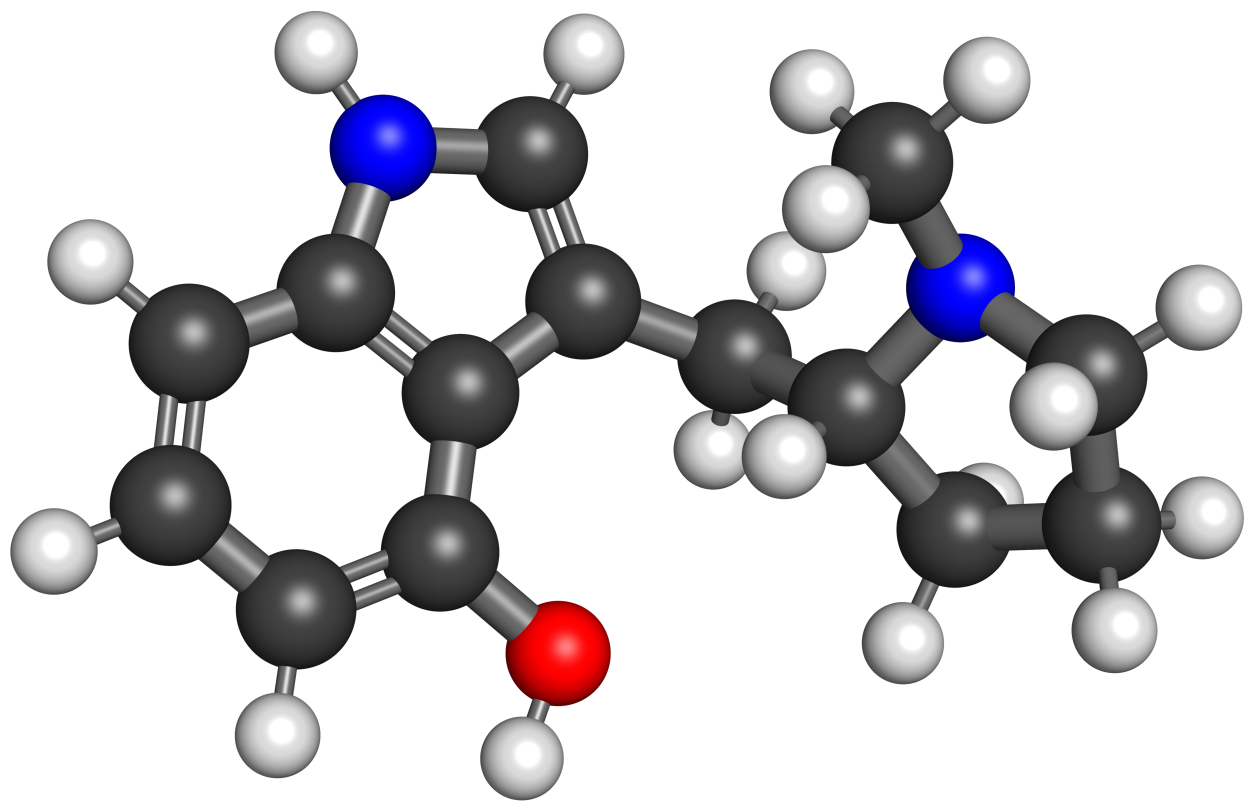

Clinical data
- Other names: 4-Hydroxy-N-methyl-(α,N-trimethylene)tryptamine; Lucigenol
- ATC code: None

Legal status
- Legal status: DE: NpSG (Industrial and scientific use only); UK: Class A

Identifiers
- IUPAC name: 3-[(1-methylpyrrolidin-2-yl)methyl]-1H-indol-4-ol
- CAS Number: 250672-65-2
- PubChem CID: 53441196
- ChemSpider: 21376515
- UNII: 46OU9HLZ35
- CompTox Dashboard (EPA): DTXSID80440389

Chemical and physical data
- Formula: C_{14}H_{17}N_{2}O
- Molar mass: 229.303 g·mol^{−1}
- 3D model (JSmol): Interactive image
- SMILES: CN1CCCC1CC2=CNC3=C2C(=CC=C3)O
- InChI: InChI=1S/C14H18N2O/c1-16-7-3-4-11(16)8-10-9-15-12-5-2-6-13(17)14(10)12/h2,5-6,9,11,15,17H,3-4,7-8H2,1H3; Key:XYRKPZYRLSWABB-UHFFFAOYSA-N

4-HO-MPMI, also known as 4-hydroxy-N-methyl-(α,N-trimethylene)tryptamine or as lucigenol, is a psychedelic drug of the pyrrolidinylmethylindole and cyclized tryptamine families.

== Pharmacology ==
=== Pharmacodynamics ===
(R)-4-HO-MPMI.

The affinity (K_{i}) of 4-HO-MPMI for the serotonin 5-HT_{2A} receptor has been found to be 13 nM. It produces psychedelic-appropriate responding in animal tests with similar potency as DOI. The drug has two enantiomers, with only the (R)-enantiomer being active.

== Chemistry ==
=== Analogues ===
Analogues of 4-HO-MPMI include MPMI, 5-MeO-MPMI, 5F-MPMI, CP-135,807, 4-HO-McPeT, 4-HO-pyr-T, and SN-22, among others.

== History ==
4-HO-MPMI was developed by the team led by David E. Nichols from Purdue University in the late 1990s.

== Society and culture ==
=== Legal status ===
==== Canada ====
4-HO-MPMI is not a controlled substance in Canada as of 2025.

== See also ==
- Pyrrolidinylmethylindole
- Cyclized tryptamine
- MSP-2020
