= Pyrrolidinylmethylindole =

Class of chemical compounds

Pyrrolidinylmethylindoles, or 3-(pyrrolidin-2-ylmethyl)-1H-indoles, also known as α,N-trimethylenetryptamines, are a group of cyclized tryptamines in which the amine has been cyclized with the α position of the ethyl side chain via a propyl group to form a pyrrolidine ring. They include the psychedelic and related compounds MPMI, 4-HO-MPMI (lucigenol), 5-F-MPMI, and 5-MeO-MPMI and the triptans and related compounds eletriptan and CP-135807. Pyrrolidinylmethylindoles are known to act as serotonin receptor agonists, including of the serotonin 5-HT_{1} and/or 5-HT_{2} receptors.

Chemical structures of selected pyrrolidinylmethylindoles
MPMI

4-HO-MPMI (lucigenol)

5-F-MPMI

5-Br-MPMI

5-MeO-MPMI

Eletriptan

CP-122288

CP-135807

MSP-2020 is also a pyrrolidinylmethylindole, though its specific chemical structure has not been disclosed and is unclear.

== See also ==
- Cyclized tryptamine
- Pyrrolidinylethylindole
- Pip-Tryptamine
