= C19H21N5O2 =

The molecular formula C_{19}H_{21}N_{5}O_{2} (molar mass: 351.40 g/mol, exact mass: 351.1695 u) may refer to:

- CP-135807
- Pirenzepine (Gastrozepin)
