= Pyrrolidinylethylindole =

Class of chemical compounds

Pyrrolidinylethylindoles, or 3-(2-pyrrolidinylethyl)indoles, also known as pyr-tryptamines or N,N-tetramethylenetryptamines, are a group of cyclized tryptamines in which the amine has been replaced with or cyclized into a pyrrolidine ring. They can also be thought of as derivatives of the psychedelic tryptamine N,N-diethyltryptamine (DET) in which the ethyl groups attached to the amine have been connected together to form a ring. Examples of pyrrolidinylethylindoles include pyr-T, 4-HO-pyr-T, 5-MeO-pyr-T, 4-F-5-MeO-pyr-T, and L-760790.

Pyrrolidinylethylindoles are known to act as serotonin receptor agonists, primarily of the serotonin 5-HT_{1A} receptor and to variably lesser extents of the serotonin 5-HT_{2A} receptor. In addition, they are known to be psychoactive drugs and some have psychedelic-like effects, although they are very different in their subjective effects compared to other psychedelic tryptamines.

Chemical structures of selected pyrrolidinylethylindoles
Pyr-T

4-HO-pyr-T

5-MeO-pyr-T

4-F-5-MeO-pyr-T

L-760790

== See also ==
- Cyclized tryptamine
- Pyrrolidinylmethylindole
- Pip-Tryptamine
