= AHR-1709 =

Clinical data
- Other names: MPTP N-ethylindole
- Drug class: Serotonin receptor modulator; Serotonin 5-HT_{1A} receptor antagonist; Serotonin 5-HT_{2A} receptor antagonist; Dopamine receptor modulator
- ATC code: None

Identifiers
- IUPAC name: 3-[2-(4-phenyl-3,6-dihydro-2H-pyridin-1-yl)ethyl]-1H-indole
- PubChem CID: 10086288
- ChemSpider: 8261825
- ChEMBL: ChEMBL127609

Chemical and physical data
- Formula: C_{21}H_{22}N_{2}
- Molar mass: 302.421 g·mol^{−1}
- 3D model (JSmol): Interactive image
- SMILES: C1CN(CC=C1C2=CC=CC=C2)CCC3=CNC4=CC=CC=C43
- InChI: InChI=1S/C21H22N2/c1-2-6-17(7-3-1)18-10-13-23(14-11-18)15-12-19-16-22-21-9-5-4-8-20(19)21/h1-10,16,22H,11-15H2; Key:ANEFQMOYWNJZFI-UHFFFAOYSA-N

AHR-1709 is an experimental antipsychotic of the tryptamine family which was never marketed. It is a cyclized tryptamine, more specifically an analogue of pip-tryptamine.

== Pharmacology ==
=== Pharmacodynamics ===
AHR-1709 shows high affinity for the serotonin 5-HT_{1A} and 5-HT_{2A} receptors (K_{i} = 27–44 nM and 4.8 nM, respectively) and for the dopamine D_{2} receptor (K_{i} = 81 nM). It may act as a serotonin 5-HT_{1A} receptor antagonist. The drug also shows high affinity for ketanserin-labeled serotonin 5-HT_{2A} receptors (K_{i} = 9.33–12.6 nM) and is a potent antagonist of these receptors (A_{2} = 24.6–120 nM).

The drug produces antipsychotic-like effects in rodents, including reversal of hyperlocomotion but without induction of catalepsy, antagonism of stereotypy, or elevation of prolactin levels. AHR-1709 also produces antiemetic effects in rodents.

It is a derivative of the dopaminergic neurotoxin MPTP and is a weak dopamine reuptake inhibitor similarly but with 23-fold higher potency (IC_{50} = 4,200 nM and 95,200 nM, respectively). However, unlike MPTP, AHR-1709 did not produce dopaminergic neurotoxicity in rodents.

== Chemistry ==
A number of derivatives of AHR-1709 have been described. An analogue of AHR-1709 with an elongated side chain is EMD-23448. AHR-1709 is also structurally similar to pertines like oxypertine.

== History ==
AHR-1709 was first described in the scientific literature by 1978.

== See also ==
- Cyclized tryptamine
- pip-Tryptamine
