= 10,11-Secoergoline =

Names
- IUPAC name 10,11-Secoergoline
- Systematic IUPAC name 3-[(Piperidin-2-yl)methyl]-1H-indole
- Other names 3-(2-Piperidylmethyl)indole; α,N-Tetramethylenetryptamine; α,N-Piperidinyltryptamine; α,N-Pip-T

Identifiers
CAS Number	5275-05-8
3D model (JSmol)	Interactive image
ChemSpider	20064
PubChem CID	21346
CompTox Dashboard (EPA)	DTXSID00967200
- InChI: InChI=1S/C14H18N2/c1-2-7-14-13(6-1)11(10-16-14)9-12-5-3-4-8-15-12/h1-2,6-7,10,12,15-16H,3-5,8-9H2 Key: NQAIQKCDQAOHIA-UHFFFAOYSA-N
- SMILES: C1CCNC(C1)CC2=CNC3=CC=CC=C32

Properties
Chemical formula	C_{14}H_{18}N_{2}
Molar mass	214.31 g/mol

Pharmacology
Drug class	Simplified/partial ergoline
- Except where otherwise noted, data are given for materials in their standard state (at 25 °C [77 °F], 100 kPa). Infobox references

10,11-Secoergoline, also known as 3-(2-piperidylmethyl)indole or as α,N-tetramethylenetryptamine, is the structure of ergoline in which the bond between the 10 and 11 positions of the ring system has been broken to unconstrain the molecule. It is also a tryptamine with the amine cyclized into a piperidine ring connected to the α position.

A notable derivative of 10,11-secoergoline is CT-5252 (methyl-12-bromo-8,9-didehydro-2,3β-dihydro-6-methyl-10,11-secoergoline-8-carboxylate), which is an analogue of lysergic acid diethylamide (LSD) with some of the same behavioral effects in animals but with much lower potency.

Another notable derivative is 10,11-seco-LSD (UCD0121).

== See also ==
- Partial ergoline
- Secoergoline
- Seco-LSD
- Pyr-T (N,N-tetramethylenetryptamine)
- SN-22 (3-(1-methyl-4-piperidinyl)indole)
- MPMI (3-(N-methylpyrrolidin-2-ylmethyl)-1H-indole)
- RU-24969
- EMD-386088
- Mefloquine
