= John E. Macor =

Medicinal chemist

- Education: University of Notre Dame (B.S.); Princeton University (Ph.D.)
- Known for: Co-inventor of eletriptan, rimegepant, zavegepant and sparsentan
- Awards: Alfred Burger Award in Medicinal Chemistry (2014); ACS MEDI Hall of Fame (2014); Edward E. Smissman Award (2019); IUPAC–Richter Prize (2020); Patrick Woster Service Award (2026)
- Scientific career
- Fields: Medicinal chemistry, drug discovery
- Workplaces: Pfizer; Bristol-Myers Squibb; Babylon Biosciences

John E. Macor is an American medicinal chemist known for his contributions to drug discovery in neuroscience and other therapeutic areas. He is a co-inventor of four drugs approved by the U.S. Food and Drug Administration (FDA): the migraine treatments eletriptan (Relpax), rimegepant (Nurtec ODT), and zavegepant (Zavzpret), and sparsentan (Filspari), a treatment for IgA nephropathy and certain patients with focal segmental glomerulosclerosis.

In 2014, he was inducted into the Hall of Fame of the American Chemical Society’s Division of Medicinal Chemistry.

Macor currently works at Babylon Biosciences, a San Francisco-based startup focused on treatments for Alzheimer's disease.

== Education ==
Macor trained as an organic chemist. Macor received his B.S. in chemistry from the University of Notre Dame and his Ph.D. in chemistry from Princeton University in 1986, where he worked under Edward C. Taylor.

== Career ==
Macor began his industrial career at Pfizer in 1986, where he was a co-inventor of eletriptan, a triptan marketed as Relpax for the acute treatment of migraine. Eletriptan was approved by the FDA in 2002.

He later joined Bristol-Myers Squibb in 1997, where he served as executive director of neuroscience chemistry. At Bristol-Myers Squibb, he was a co-inventor in the program that produced the CGRP receptor antagonists rimegepant and zavegepant, which were subsequently developed by Biohaven Pharmaceuticals and approved by the FDA in 2020 and 2023, respectively, for the treatment of migraine.

He is also a co-inventor of sparsentan, a dual endothelin and angiotensin II receptor antagonist developed by Travere Therapeutics and approved by the FDA in 2023 for the reduction of proteinuria in adults with IgA nephropathy. On April 13, 2026, the FDA also approved sparsentan to reduce proteinuria in patients aged eight years and older with focal segmental glomerulosclerosis without nephrotic syndrome.

Macor’s work at Bristol-Myers Squibb also included the company’s Alzheimer’s disease program, where he contributed to the discovery of avagacestat (BMS-708163), a γ-secretase inhibitor that advanced to Phase 2 clinical trials before development was discontinued.

Macor also co-authored medicinal-chemistry and preclinical research on BMS-984923, subsequently designated ALX-001, a silent allosteric modulator of metabotropic glutamate receptor 5 developed by Allyx Therapeutics for Alzheimer's and Parkinson's diseases.

Macor is an author on more than 220 peer-reviewed publications and a named inventor on 150 issued U.S. patents.

== Current clinical development ==
=== Active clinical trials ===
Compound	Clinical development
Afimetoran	In November 2026, Beeline Medicines reported that its Phase 2 trial in systemic lupus erythematosus met its primary endpoint: at week 48, SLE Responder Index-4 (SRI-4) response rates were 64.1–67.8% across the three afimetoran doses, compared with 34.4% for placebo (p<0.001 for each dose). The company planned Phase 3 development in systemic lupus erythematosus in 2027, while its Phase 2/3 DISCOVERY trial in cutaneous lupus erythematosus was recruiting participants.
CSTI-500	A triple monoamine reuptake inhibitor in Phase 2a trials for Prader–Willi syndrome; first participant dosed in June 2026.

=== Programs between clinical stages ===
Compound	Clinical development
Pilavapadin	Phase 3 development planned following a January 2026 end-of-Phase 2 meeting for diabetic peripheral neuropathic pain.
SION-451	Following Phase 1 combination studies, Sionna selected SION-451 with SION-2222 for further development in cystic fibrosis. In its quarterly report for September 2026, the company stated that it planned to begin the AscenSION CF Phase 2 proof-of-concept trial in the first quarter of 2027.
ALX-001 (BMS-984923)	Investigated in Phase 1 studies assessing safety, tolerability, pharmacokinetics, receptor occupancy, food effects and drug interactions, including studies in patients with Alzheimer's and Parkinson's diseases. As of November 2026, Allyx described the Alzheimer's program as ready for Phase 2 and the Parkinson's Phase 1b study as completed.

== Discontinued add-on program ==
Compound	Clinical development
SION-719	Development as an add-on to Trikafta was discontinued after the PreciSION CF Phase 2a trial failed to meet its key activity endpoint. Sionna reported that the associated wind-down of vendor arrangements was substantially completed by the end of September 2026.

== Honors ==
- Robert M. Scarborough Award for Excellence in Medicinal Chemistry, ACS Division of Medicinal Chemistry (2009)
- Inducted as an American Chemical Society Fellow (2011)
- Alfred Burger Award in Medicinal Chemistry, American Chemical Society (2014)
- Inducted into the American Chemical Society Division of Medicinal Chemistry Hall of Fame (2014)
- Edward E. Smissman Award in Medicinal Chemistry, ACS Division of Medicinal Chemistry (2019)
- IUPAC–Richter Prize in Medicinal Chemistry (2020)
- Patrick Woster Award for Service to the Division of Medicinal Chemistry, ACS Division of Medicinal Chemistry (2026)

== Selected publications ==
- Gillman, K. W.; et al. (2010). "Discovery and Evaluation of BMS-708163, a Potent, Selective and Orally Bioavailable γ-Secretase Inhibitor". ACS Medicinal Chemistry Letters. 1 (3): 120–124. doi:10.1021/ml1000239. PMC 4007960. PMID 24900185.
- Luo, G.; et al. (2012). "Discovery of (5S,6S,9R)-5-amino-6-(2,3-difluorophenyl)-6,7,8,9-tetrahydro-5H-cyclohepta[b]pyridin-9-yl 4-(2-oxo-2,3-dihydro-1H-imidazo[4,5-b]pyridin-1-yl)piperidine-1-carboxylate (BMS-927711): an oral calcitonin gene-related peptide (CGRP) antagonist in clinical trials for treating migraine". Journal of Medicinal Chemistry. 55 (23): 10644–10651. doi:10.1021/jm3013147. PMID 23153230.
