= 4-F-5-MeO-pyr-T =

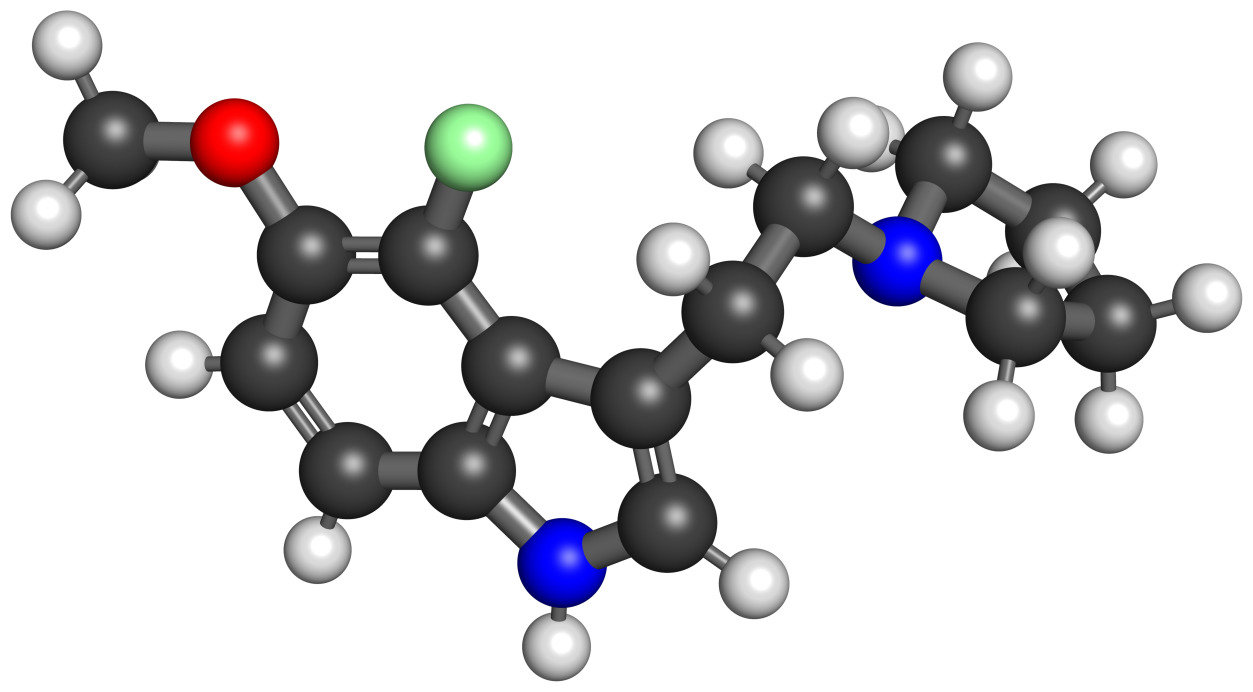

Clinical data
- Other names: 4-Fluoro-5-MeO-pyr-T; 4-F,5-MeO-PyrT; 4-Fluoro-5-methoxy-N,N-pyrrolidinyltryptamine
- Drug class: Serotonin 5-HT_{1A} receptor agonist
- ATC code: None

Identifiers
- IUPAC name: 4-fluoro-5-methoxy-3-(2-pyrrolidin-1-ylethyl)-1H-indole
- CAS Number: 344790-93-8
- PubChem CID: 10015574
- ChemSpider: 8191147
- ChEMBL: ChEMBL352186
- CompTox Dashboard (EPA): DTXSID501201608

Chemical and physical data
- Formula: C_{15}H_{19}FN_{2}O
- Molar mass: 262.328 g·mol^{−1}
- 3D model (JSmol): Interactive image
- SMILES: COC1=C(C2=C(C=C1)NC=C2CCN3CCCC3)F
- InChI: InChI=1S/C15H19FN2O/c1-19-13-5-4-12-14(15(13)16)11(10-17-12)6-9-18-7-2-3-8-18/h4-5,10,17H,2-3,6-9H2,1H3; Key:FJCRAYWNOXUYOO-UHFFFAOYSA-N

4-F-5-MeO-pyr-T, also known as 4-fluoro-5-methoxy-N,N-pyrrolidinyltryptamine, is a serotonin 5-HT_{1A} receptor agonist of the tryptamine and pyrrolidinylethylindole families. It is a derivative of pyr-T and 5-MeO-DMT.

== Pharmacology ==
4-F-5-MeO-pyr-T acts as a highly potent and selective serotonin 5-HT_{1A} receptor full agonist. It shows about 813-fold selectivity in activating this receptor over the related serotonin 5-HT_{2A} receptor. The drug shows little activity at other serotonin receptors besides the serotonin 5-HT_{1A} receptor and little activity at the serotonin transporter (SERT) or other monoamine transporters (MATs).

4-F-5-MeO-pyr-T does not produce the head-twitch response, a behavioral proxy of psychedelic effects, in rodents, and this is the case regardless of whether it is administered alone or in combination with the serotonin 5-HT_{1A} receptor antagonist WAY-100635. Likewise, 4-F-5-MeO-pyr-T does not substitute for the psychedelics DOI and LSD in animal drug discrimination tests. However, it fully substitutes for the serotonin 5-HT_{1A} receptor full agonist LY-293284 in such tests. 4-F-5-MeO-pyr-T produces serotonin 5-HT_{1A} receptor-dependent antidepressant-like effects in rodents. It also dose-dependently produces hypolocomotion in rodents. At higher doses, 4-F-5-MeO-pyr-T induces a pronounced serotonin syndrome and behavioral disruption in rodents, including flat body posture and forepaw treading.

4-F-5-MeO-pyr-T is a potential alternative to 8-OH-DPAT as a serotonin 5-HT_{1A} receptor agonist for use in scientific research.

== History ==
4-F-5-MeO-pyr-T was first synthesized and described by David E. Nichols and colleagues in 2001.

== See also ==
- Pyrrolidinylethylindole
- Cyclized tryptamine
- Pyr-T
- 5-MeO-pyr-T
- 4-HO-pyr-T
- 4-F-5-MeO-DMT
- 4-Fluoro-DMT
