= MSP-2020 =

Clinical data
- Other names: MSP2020
- Routes of administration: Oral
- Drug class: Serotonin receptor agonist; Serotonin 5-HT_{2A} receptor agonist; Serotonergic psychedelic; Hallucinogen
- ATC code: None

MSP-2020 is a psychedelic drug of the tryptamine and pyrrolidinylmethylindole families related to psilocybin which is under development for the treatment of mental disorders such as major depressive disorder. It is taken orally. The drug acts as a serotonin 5-HT_{2A} receptor agonist and is described as a prodrug. It is a 3-pyrrolidine–indole derivative and hence cyclized tryptamine and is said to be psilocybin-like but with stronger effects and a shorter duration. MSP-2020 was originated by Mindset Pharma and is now under development by Otsuka America Pharmaceutical, which acquired Mindset Pharma in January 2024. As of January 2026, MSP-2020 is in phase 1 clinical trials for major depressive disorder. MSP-2020 was patented by Mindset Pharma in 2021, though its specific chemical structure has not been disclosed and is unclear.

== See also ==
- Cyclized tryptamine
- Pyrrolidinylmethylindole
- List of investigational hallucinogens and entactogens
- Lucigenol
- MSP-1014
