= L-760790 =

Identifiers
- IUPAC name: N-benzyl-1-[(3S)-1-[2-[5-(1,2,4-triazol-4-yl)-1H-indol-3-yl]ethyl]pyrrolidin-3-yl]methanamine
- PubChem CID: 10386282
- ChemSpider: 8561724
- ChEMBL: ChEMBL420965

Chemical and physical data
- Formula: C_{24}H_{28}N_{6}
- Molar mass: 400.530 g·mol^{−1}
- 3D model (JSmol): Interactive image
- SMILES: C1CN(C[C@@H]1CNCC2=CC=CC=C2)CCC3=CNC4=C3C=C(C=C4)N5C=NN=C5
- InChI: InChI=1S/C24H28N6/c1-2-4-19(5-3-1)13-25-14-20-8-10-29(16-20)11-9-21-15-26-24-7-6-22(12-23(21)24)30-17-27-28-18-30/h1-7,12,15,17-18,20,25-26H,8-11,13-14,16H2/t20-/m0/s1; Key:JCFDYNJSFCXYRT-FQEVSTJZSA-N

L-760,790 is an experimental drug from the substituted tryptamine family, which acts as a selective agonist for the 5-HT_{1D} serotonin receptor, with around 62x selectivity for 5-HT_{1D} over the closely related 5-HT_{1B} receptor.

== See also ==
- Cyclized tryptamine
- Pyrrolidinylethylindole
