= Pip-Tryptamine =

pip-Tryptamine

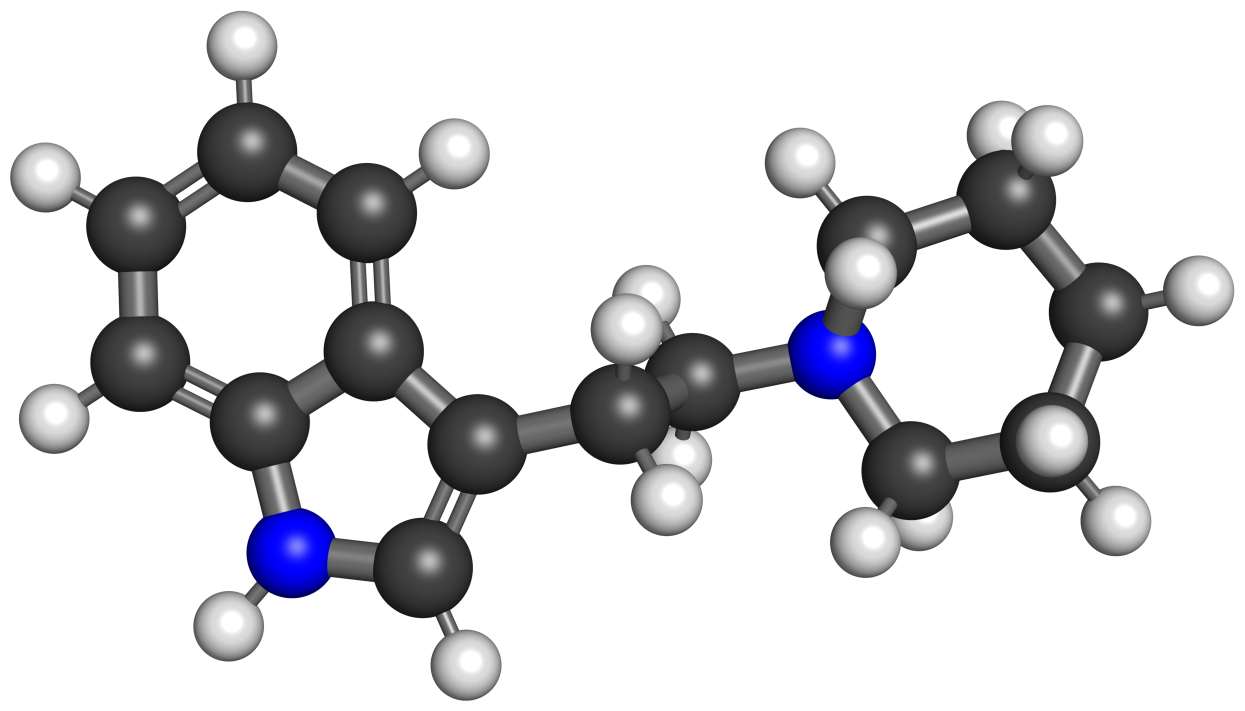

Clinical data
- Other names: 3-(2-Piperidinoethyl)indole; PEI; N-Piperidyltryptamine; N,N-Piperidyltryptamine; Piperidinyltryptamine; Piperidinotryptamine; PIT; N,N-Pentamethylenetryptamine
- Drug class: Serotonin receptor modulator
- ATC code: None

Identifiers
- IUPAC name: 3-(2-piperidin-1-ylethyl)-1H-indole
- CAS Number: 26628-87-5
- PubChem CID: 33560
- ChemSpider: 30961
- ChEMBL: ChEMBL2138465
- CompTox Dashboard (EPA): DTXSID70181173

Chemical and physical data
- Formula: C_{15}H_{20}N_{2}
- Molar mass: 228.339 g·mol^{−1}
- 3D model (JSmol): Interactive image
- SMILES: C1CCN(CC1)CCC2=CNC3=CC=CC=C32
- InChI: InChI=1S/C15H20N2/c1-4-9-17(10-5-1)11-8-13-12-16-15-7-3-2-6-14(13)15/h2-3,6-7,12,16H,1,4-5,8-11H2; Key:PJVCNRSWJSLGCV-UHFFFAOYSA-N

pip-Tryptamine (pip-T), also known as N,N-pentamethylenetryptamine, N,N-piperidyltryptamine, or 3-(2-piperidinoethyl)indole (PEI), is a serotonin receptor modulator and possible serotonergic psychedelic of the tryptamine family. It is the derivative of tryptamine in which the amine has been cyclized into a piperidine ring.

== Use and effects ==
pip-T was only briefly mentioned by Alexander Shulgin in his book TiHKAL (Tryptamines I Have Known and Loved). Its properties and effects were not described.

== Pharmacology ==
=== Pharmacodynamics ===
The affinities (IC_{50}) of pip-tryptamine for serotonin receptors were 600 nM for the serotonin 5-HT_{1A} receptor, 760 nM for the serotonin 5-HT_{2A} receptor, and 1,250 nM for the serotonin 5-HT_{2B} receptor, whereas other serotonin receptors were not reported. The affinity of pip-T for the serotonin 5-HT_{2A} receptor was about 10-fold lower than that of dimethyltryptamine (DMT) and was about 7-fold lower than that of pyr-tryptamine (pyr-T; N,N-pyrrolidinyltryptamine). Pip-T is a serotonin receptor agonist in the rat uterus with similar potency as DMT, but showed 20-fold lower potency than DMT in the rat fundus strip.

The drug produces hypolocomotion in rodents. In addition, it induces the head-twitch response, a behavioral proxy of psychedelic effects, in rodents. This was blocked by the serotonin 5-HT_{2A} receptor antagonist ketanserin. Hence, the drug may have hallucinogenic effects in humans. Conversely, pip-T did not produce conditioned place preference (CPP) and was not self-administered, suggesting that it lacks reinforcing properties and misuse potential, similarly to most other tryptamines.

== Chemistry ==
=== Synthesis ===
The chemical synthesis of pip-T has been described.

=== Analogues ===
Analogues of pip-T include 5-MeO-pip-T, 10,11-secoergoline (α,N-Pip-T), pyr-T, MPMI, SN-22, RU-24,969, EMD-386088, and AHR-1709, among others.

==== mor-Tryptamine ====
mor-Tryptamine structure.

mor-Tryptamine, or mor-T, also known as 3-(2-morpholinoethyl)indole (MEI), is the analogue of pip-T with the piperidine ring replaced with a morpholine ring. It was briefly described by Alexander Shulgin in his book TiHKAL (Tryptamines I Have Known and Loved), including its chemical synthesis. The drug was tested by intramuscular injection of 30 mg as the fumarate salt, but produced no effects whatsoever. Accordingly, mor-T was completely inactive as a serotonin receptor agonist in the rat uterus and rat stomach strip. It has also been assessed in other serotonin receptor assays, where it showed mixed activities. The 5-methoxy derivative of mor-T, 5-MeO-mor-T, is also known, but is not known to have been tested.

== History ==
Pip-T was first described in the scientific literature by 1959 and was more thoroughly characterized in 1990 and 2020.

== See also ==
- Substituted tryptamine
- Cyclized tryptamine
