= 5-MeO-pip-T =

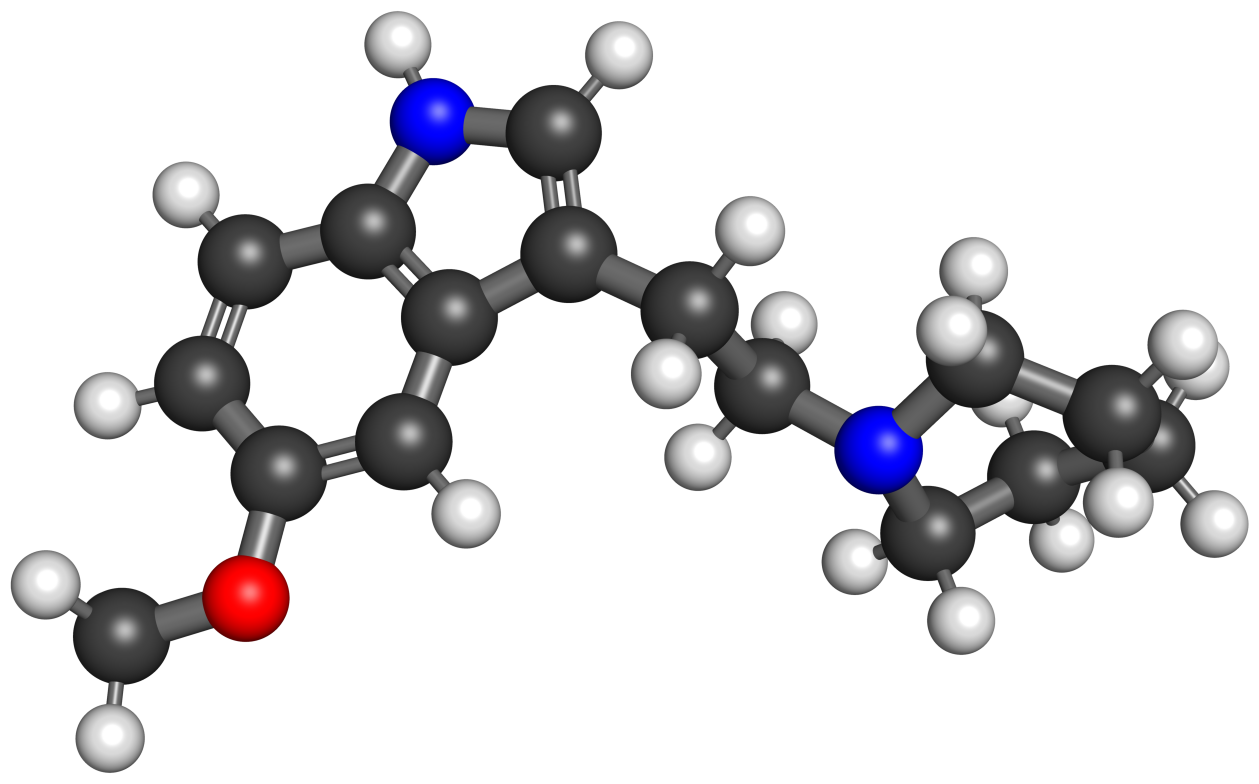

Clinical data
- Other names: 5-Methoxy-pip-tryptamine
- Drug class: Serotonin receptor modulator; Selective serotonin 5-HT_{1A} receptor agonist
- ATC code: None

Identifiers
- IUPAC name: 5-methoxy-3-(2-piperidin-1-ylethyl)-1H-indole
- PubChem CID: 10467710
- ChemSpider: 8643121
- ChEMBL: ChEMBL292921

Chemical and physical data
- Formula: C_{16}H_{22}N_{2}O
- Molar mass: 258.365 g·mol^{−1}
- 3D model (JSmol): Interactive image
- SMILES: COC1=CC2=C(C=C1)NC=C2CCN3CCCCC3
- InChI: InChI=1S/C16H22N2O/c1-19-14-5-6-16-15(11-14)13(12-17-16)7-10-18-8-3-2-4-9-18/h5-6,11-12,17H,2-4,7-10H2,1H3; Key:QVWFRPYLSDUCFB-UHFFFAOYSA-N

5-MeO-pip-T, also known as 5-methoxy-pip-tryptamine, is a serotonin receptor modulator and selective serotonin 5-HT_{1A} receptor agonist of the tryptamine family related to 5-MeO-pyr-T.

== Use and effects ==
5-MeO-pip-T was described and partially synthesized by Alexander Shulgin in his 1997 book TiHKAL (Tryptamines I Have Known and Loved), but he did not test it or define its properties or effects. According to Shulgin, he was not in a hurry to test it owing to the unfavorable effects of the structurally related 5-MeO-pyr-T.

== Pharmacology ==
=== Pharmacodynamics ===
5-MeO-pip-T shows affinity for the serotonin 5-HT_{2A} receptor (K_{i} = 160–230 nM) but not for the serotonin 5-HT_{2C} receptor (K_{i} = >10,000 nM). It has been found to act as a low-potency and low-efficacy agonist of the serotonin 5-HT_{2A} receptor (EC_{50} = 7,410 nM; E_{max} = 16%) and the serotonin 5-HT_{4} receptor (EC_{50} = 1,200 nM; E_{max} = 34%). These findings were also replicated in a subsequent study, where 5-MeO-pip-T showed far lower potency and efficacy as a serotonin 5-HT_{2A} receptor agonist than 5-MeO-DMT or 5-MeO-pyr-T. On the other hand, 5-MeO-pip-T was a potent full agonist of the serotonin 5-HT_{1A} receptor, with an EC_{50} of 88.5 nM, although it was 42-fold less potent in this action than the highly potent 5-MeO-pyr-T. As such, 5-MeO-pip-T was described as a selective serotonin 5-HT_{1A} receptor agonist.

== Chemistry ==
=== Synthesis ===
The chemical synthesis of 5-MeO-pip-T has been described.

=== Analogues ===
Analogues of 5-MeO-pip-T include pip-tryptamine (pip-T), pyr-tryptamine (pyr-T), 5-MeO-pyr-T, 5-MeO-DMT, and 5-MeO-DET, among others.

==== 5-MeO-mor-T ====
5-MeO-mor-T structure.

5-MeO-mor-T, the 5-methoxy derivative of mor-tryptamine (mor-T) and the analogue of 5-MeO-pip-T in which the piperidine ring is replaced by a morpholine ring, was also partially synthesized and briefly described by Alexander Shulgin in his book TiHKAL (Tryptamines I Have Known and Loved), but he did not test it.

== History ==
5-MeO-pip-T was first described in the scientific literature by Richard Glennon and colleagues by 1994. It was briefly described by Alexander Shulgin in his 1997 book TiHKAL (Tryptamines I Have Known and Loved). The pharmacology of 5-MeO-pip-T was described in greater detail in 2024.

== See also ==
- Piperidinylethylindole
- Cyclized tryptamine
