= 5-Fluoro-MPMI =

Chemical compound

Clinical data
- Other names: 5F-MPMI; 5-F-MPMI
- Drug class: Serotonin receptor agonist; Serotonin 5-HT_{2A} receptor agonist

Identifiers
- IUPAC name: 5-fluoro-3-[(1-methylpyrrolidin-2-yl)methyl]-1H-indole
- CAS Number: 244122-80-3
- PubChem CID: 19970217
- ChemSpider: 14091331

Chemical and physical data
- Formula: C_{14}H_{17}FN_{2}
- Molar mass: 232.302 g·mol^{−1}
- 3D model (JSmol): Interactive image
- SMILES: CN1CCCC1CC2=CNC3=C2C=C(C=C3)F
- InChI: InChI=1S/C14H17FN2/c1-17-6-2-3-12(17)7-10-9-16-14-5-4-11(15)8-13(10)14/h4-5,8-9,12,16H,2-3,6-7H2,1H3; Key:XMAODTLZCWIQBA-UHFFFAOYSA-N

5-Fluoro-MPMI, also known as 5F-MPMI or 5-F-MPMI, is a pyrrolidinylmethylindole and cyclized tryptamine derivative which acts as a serotonin receptor agonist, selective for the 5-HT_{2} subtypes but with similar affinity to all three receptors, having strongest activity at 5-HT_{2B} and weakest at 5-HT_{2A}.

== Chemistry ==
=== Analogues ===
Analogues of MPMI include MPMI, 4-HO-MPMI, and 5-MeO-MPMI, among others.

== See also ==
- Pyrrolidinylmethylindole
- Cyclized tryptamine
