= Mefloquine =

Pharmaceutical drug

Clinical data
- Trade names: Lariam, Mephaquin, Mefliam, others
- Other names: 2,8-Di(trifluoromethyl)-β-hydroxy-α,N-tetramethylene-quinolinylethylamine
- AHFS/Drugs.com: Monograph
- MedlinePlus: a603030
- License data: US DailyMed: Mefloquine
- Pregnancy category: AU: B3
- Routes of administration: Oral
- Drug class: Antimalarial
- ATC code: P01BC02 (WHO)

Legal status
- Legal status: AU: S4 (Prescription only); CA: ℞-only; UK: POM (Prescription only); US: ℞-only

Pharmacokinetic data
- Metabolism: Extensive liver; main metabolite is inactive
- Elimination half-life: 2 to 4 weeks
- Excretion: Primarily bile and feces; urine (9% as unchanged drug, 4% as primary metabolite)

Identifiers
- IUPAC name: [(R*,S*)-2,8-Bis(trifluoromethyl)quinolin-4-yl]-(2-piperidyl)methanol
- CAS Number: 53230-10-7
- PubChem CID: 40692
- DrugBank: DB00358
- ChemSpider: 37171
- UNII: TML814419R
- KEGG: D04895
- ChEMBL: ChEMBL416956
- NIAID ChemDB: 005218
- CompTox Dashboard (EPA): DTXSID50860636

Chemical and physical data
- Formula: C_{17}H_{16}F_{6}N_{2}O
- Molar mass: 378.318 g·mol^{−1}
- 3D model (JSmol): Interactive image
- Chirality: Racemic mixture
- SMILES: FC(F)(F)c2cccc1c(cc(nc12)C(F)(F)F)[C@H](O)[C@@H]3NCCCC3
- InChI: InChI=1S/C17H16F6N2O/c18-16(19,20)11-5-3-4-9-10(15(26)12-6-1-2-7-24-12)8-13(17(21,22)23)25-14(9)11/h3-5,8,12,15,24,26H,1-2,6-7H2/t12-,15+/m1/s1; Key:XEEQGYMUWCZPDN-DOMZBBRYSA-N

Mefloquine, sold under the brand name Lariam among others, is a medication used to prevent or treat malaria. When used for prevention it is typically started before potential exposure and continued for several weeks after potential exposure. It can be used to treat mild or moderate malaria but is not recommended for severe malaria. It is taken by mouth.

Common side effects include vomiting, diarrhea, headaches, sleep disorders, and a rash. Serious side effects include potentially long-term mental health problems such as depression, hallucinations, and anxiety and neurological side effects such as poor balance, seizures, and ringing in the ears. It is therefore not recommended in people with a history of mental health problems or epilepsy. It appears to be safe during pregnancy and breastfeeding.

Mefloquine was developed by the United States Army in the 1970s and came into use in the mid-1980s. It is on the World Health Organization's List of Essential Medicines. It is available as a generic medication.

== Medical uses ==
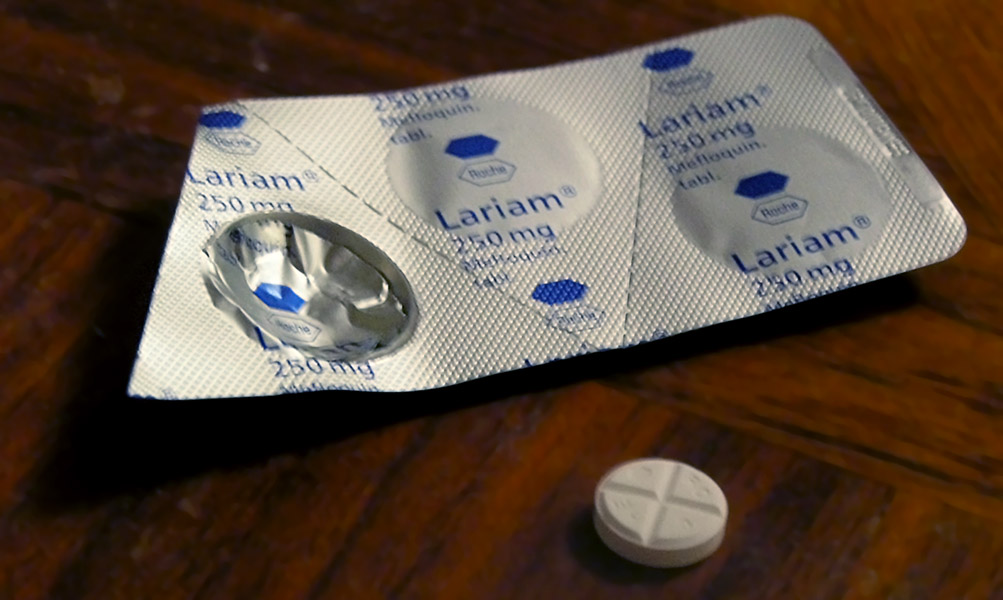
Mefloquine (Lariam) 250mg tablets

Mefloquine is used to both prevent and treat certain forms of malaria.

=== Malaria prevention ===
Mefloquine is useful for the prevention of malaria in all areas except for those where parasites may have resistance to multiple medications, and is one of several anti-malarial medications recommended by the United States Centers for Disease Control and Prevention for this purpose. It is also recommended by the Infectious Disease Society of America for malaria prophylaxis as a first or second-line agent, depending on resistance patterns in the malaria found in the geographic region visited. It is typically taken for one to two weeks before entering an area with malaria. Doxycycline and atovaquone/proguanil provide protection within one to two days and may be better tolerated. If a person becomes ill with malaria despite prophylaxis with mefloquine, the use of halofantrine and quinine for treatment may be ineffective.

=== Malaria treatment ===
Mefloquine is used as a treatment for chloroquine-sensitive or resistant Plasmodium falciparum malaria, and is deemed a reasonable alternative for uncomplicated chloroquine-resistant Plasmodium vivax malaria. It is one of several drugs recommended by the United States' Centers for Disease Control and Prevention. It is not recommended for severe malaria infections, particularly infections from P. falciparum, which should be treated with intravenous antimalarials. Mefloquine does not eliminate parasites in the liver phase of the disease, and people with P. vivax malaria should be treated with a second drug that is effective for the liver phase, such as primaquine.

=== Resistance to mefloquine ===
Resistance to mefloquine is common around the west border in Cambodia and other parts of Southeast Asia. The mechanism of resistance is by increase in Pfmdr1 copy number.

== Contraindications ==
Mefloquine is contraindicated in those with a previous history of seizures or a recent history of psychiatric disorders.

=== Pregnancy and breastfeeding ===
Available data suggests that mefloquine is safe and effective for use by pregnant women during all trimesters of pregnancy, and it is widely used for this indication. In pregnant women, mefloquine appears to pose minimal risk to the fetus, and is not associated with increased risk of birth defects or miscarriages. Compared to other malaria chemoprophylaxis regimens, however, mefloqinone may produce more side effects in non-pregnant travelers.

Mefloquine is also safe and effective for use during breastfeeding, though it appears in breast milk in low concentrations. The World Health Organization (WHO) gives approval for the use of mefloquine in the second and third trimesters of pregnancy and use in the first trimester does not mandate termination of pregnancy.

== Adverse effects ==
Common side effects include vomiting, diarrhea, headaches, and a rash. Severe side effects requiring hospitalization are rare, but include mental health problems such as depression, hallucinations, anxiety and neurological side effects such as poor balance, seizures, and ringing in the ears. Mefloquine is therefore not recommended in people with a history of psychiatric disorders or epilepsy.

Liver function tests should be performed during long-term administration of mefloquine. Alcohol use should be avoided during treatment with mefloquine.

=== Neurologic and psychiatric ===
In 2013, the US Food and Drug Administration (FDA) added a boxed warning to the prescribing information of mefloquine regarding the potential for neuropsychiatric side effects that may persist even after discontinuing administration of the medication. In 2013 the FDA stated "Neurologic side effects can occur at any time during drug use, and can last for months to years after the drug is stopped or can be permanent." Neurologic effects include dizziness, loss of balance, seizures, and tinnitus. Psychiatric effects include nightmares, visual hallucinations, auditory hallucinations, anxiety, depression, unusual behavior, and suicidal ideations.

Central nervous system events requiring hospitalization occur in about one in 10,000 people taking mefloquine for malaria prevention, with milder events (e.g., dizziness, headache, insomnia, and vivid dreams) in up to 25%. When some measure of subjective severity is applied to the rating of adverse events, about 11–17% of travelers are incapacitated to some degree.

=== Cardiac ===
Mefloquine may cause abnormalities with heart rhythms that are visible on electrocardiograms. Combining mefloquine with other drugs that cause similar effects, such as quinine or quinidine, can increase these effects. Combining mefloquine with halofantrine can cause significant increases in QTc intervals.

== Pharmacology ==
=== Pharmacodynamics ===
Mefloquine activities
Target	Affinity (K_{i}, nM)	
Target	(+)-Mefloquine	(–)-Mefloquine
5-HT_{1A}	>9,100	>10,000
5-HT_{2A}	341–2,940 (K_{i}); 1,990 (EC_{50}); 41% (E_{max})	1,510–4,260 (K_{i}) >100,000 (EC_{50}) <12% (E_{max})
5-HT_{2C}	5,730 (K_{i}); 224 (EC_{50}); 81% (E_{max})	3,870 (K_{i}); 12,000 (EC_{50}); 71% (E_{max})
5-HT_{3}	660–2,700 (IC_{50}) (mefloquine)	
D_{1}	>10,000	>10,000
D_{2}	>10,000	>10,000
D_{3}	1,960	>10,000
D_{4.4}	>10,000	>10,000
GABA_{A}	98,700–328,000 (IC_{50}) (mefloquine)	
GABA_{A}-ρ	IA (IC_{50}) (mefloquine)	
SERT	229 (K_{i}); 341 (IC_{50})	2,900 (K_{i}) >6,500 (IC_{50})
NET	5,300 (K_{i}) >10,000 (IC_{50})	5,280 (K_{i}) >10,000 (IC_{50})
DAT	>6,400 (K_{i}) >10,000 (IC_{50})	6,500 (K_{i}) >10,000 (IC_{50})
Notes: The smaller the value, the more avidly the drug binds to the site. All proteins are human unless otherwise specified. Refs:

The mechanism of action of mefloquine is unclear and several competing hypotheses exist.

==== Off-target activities ====
Mefloquine has known off-target activities. This includes affinity for the serotonin 5-HT_{2A} receptor and to a lesser extent for the serotonin 5-HT_{2C} receptor, but not for the serotonin 5-HT_{1A} receptor. The drug acts as a partial agonist of both the serotonin 5-HT_{2A} and 5-HT_{2C} receptors, similarly to serotonergic psychedelics like LSD, DOM, and DMT. (+)-Mefloquine showed about 1.6-fold lower affinity, 8.8-fold lower potency, and about the same efficacy as a serotonin 5-HT_{2A} receptor agonist compared to DMT, whereas (–)-mefloquine was inactive. Mefloquine also binds to the serotonin transporter and acts as a serotonin reuptake inhibitor, acts as a serotonin 5-HT_{3} receptor and GABA_{A} receptor antagonist, and shows affinity for the dopamine D_{3} receptor, among other actions. These properties of mefloquine, especially serotonin 5-HT_{2A} receptor agonism, may be involved in the neurological and psychiatric adverse effects such as visual hallucinations that have been reported with its use particularly at high doses. Mefloquine is also thought to have potential antiepileptic effects due to its ability to non-specifically block connexin hemi-channels and pannexons.

=== Pharmacokinetics ===
Mefloquine is metabolized primarily through the liver. Its elimination in persons with impaired liver function may be prolonged, resulting in higher plasma levels and an increased risk of adverse reactions. The mean plasma elimination half-life of mefloquine is between 2 and 4 weeks. Total clearance is through the liver, and the primary means of excretion is through the bile and feces, as opposed to only 4% to 9% excreted through the urine. During long-term use, the plasma half-life remains unchanged.

== Chemistry ==
(R,S)-(+)-Mefloquine and (S,R)-(−)-mefloquine chemical formulae.

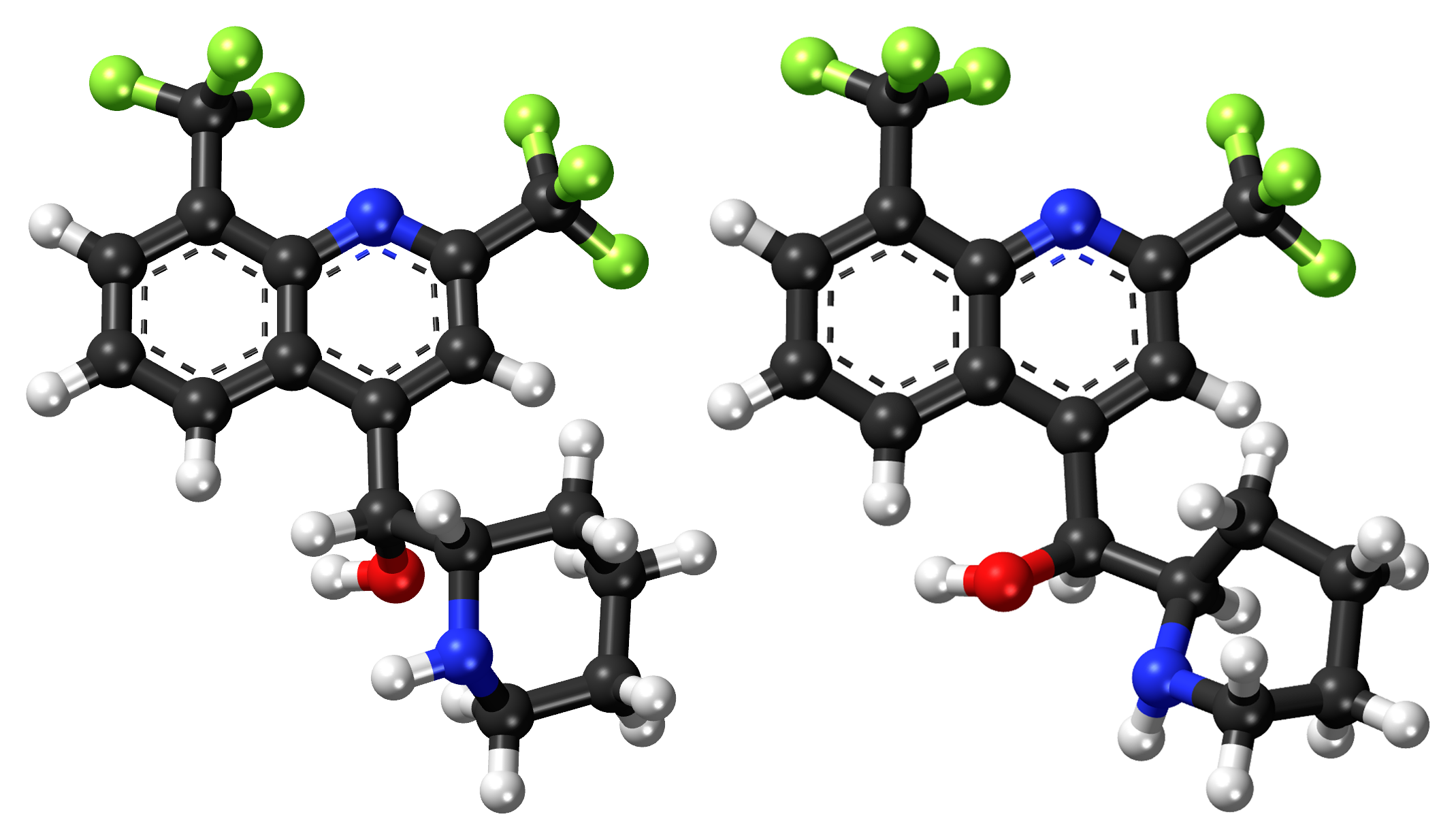
(R,S)-(+)-Mefloquine and (S,R)-(−)-mefloquine ball-and-stick models.

Mefloquine is a chiral molecule with two asymmetric carbon centres, which means it has four different stereoisomers. The drug is currently manufactured and sold as a racemate of the (R,S)- and (S,R)-enantiomers by Hoffmann-La Roche, a Swiss pharmaceutical company. Essentially, it is two drugs in one. Plasma concentrations of the (–)-enantiomer are significantly higher than those for the (+)-enantiomer, and the pharmacokinetics between the two enantiomers are significantly different. The (+)-enantiomer has a shorter half-life than the (–)-enantiomer. Specifically it is used as mefloquine hydrochloride.

The chemical structure of mefloquine is similar to that of tryptamine and its derivatives. However, whereas tryptamine is an indolylethylamine, mefloquine is a cyclized quinolinylethylamine. Mefloquine's structure is also particularly similar to that of 10,11-secoergoline (α,N-tetramethylenetryptamine). In addition, it is similar to that of LSD-Quinoline, the analogue of LSD in which the indole ring within the ergoline ring system has been replaced with a quinoline ring.

Chemical structures of mefloquine and psychedelic-related analogues
Mefloquine

Tryptamine

10,11-Secoergoline

LSD-Quinoline

== History ==
Mefloquine was formulated at Walter Reed Army Institute of Research (WRAIR) in the 1970s shortly after the end of the Vietnam war. Mefloquine was number 142,490 of a total of 250,000 antimalarial compounds screened during the study.

Mefloquine was the first Public-Private Venture (PPV) between the US Department of Defense and a pharmaceutical company. WRAIR transferred all its phase I and phase II clinical trial data to Hoffman-LaRoche and Smith Kline. FDA approval as a treatment for malaria was swift. Most notably, phase III safety and tolerability trials were skipped.

The drug was first approved in Switzerland in 1984 by Hoffmann-LaRoche, who brought it to market with the name Lariam.

However, mefloquine was not approved by the FDA for prophylactic use until 1989. This approval was based primarily on compliance, while safety and tolerability were overlooked. Because of the drug's very long half-life, the Centers for Disease Control originally recommended a mefloquine dosage of 250 mg every two weeks; however, this caused an unacceptably high malaria rate in the Peace Corps volunteers who participated in the approval study, so the drug regimen was switched to once a week.

By 1991, Hoffman was marketing the drug on a worldwide basis.

By the 1992 UNITAF, Canadian soldiers were being prescribed the drug en masse.

By 1994, medical professionals were noting "severe psychiatric side effects observed during prophylaxis and treatment with mefloquine", and recommending that "the absence of contraindications and minor side effects during an initial course of mefloquine should be confirmed before another course is prescribed." Other doctors at the University Hospital of Zurich noted in a case of "a 47-year-old, previously healthy Japanese tourist" who had severe neuropsychiatric side-effects from the drug that

The neuropsychiatric side effects of the antimalarial drug mefloquine are well documented. They include anxiety, depression, hallucinations, acute psychosis, and seizures. The incidence of these side effects is 1 in 13,000 with prophylactic use and 1 in 250 with therapeutic use.

The first randomized, controlled trial on a mixed population was performed in 2001. Prophylaxis with mefloquine was compared to prophylaxis with atovaquone-proguanil. Roughly 67% of participants in the mefloquine arm reported greater than or equal to one adverse event, versus 71% in the atovaquone-proguanil arm. In the mefloquine arm, 5% of the users reported severe events requiring medical attention, versus 1.2% in the atovaquone-proguanil arm.

In August 2009, Roche stopped marketing Lariam in the United States.

Retired soldier Johnny Mercer, who was later appointed Minister for Veterans Affairs by Boris Johnson, told in 2015 that he had received "a letter about once or twice a week" about ill-effects from the drug. In July 2016, Roche took this brand off the market in Ireland.

=== Military ===
In 2006, the Australian military deemed mefloquine "a third-line drug" alternative. Between 2006 and 2011, only 25 soldiers had been prescribed the drug, and only in cases of their intolerance for other alternatives. Between 2001 and 2012, 16,000 Canadian soldiers sent to Afghanistan were given the drug as a preventative measure. In 2013, the US Army banned mefloquine from use by its special forces such as the Green Berets. In autumn 2016, the UK military followed their Australian peers after a parliamentary inquiry into the matter revealed that it can cause permanent side effects and brain damage.

In early December 2016, the German defence ministry removed mefloquine from the list of medications it would provide to its soldiers.

In autumn 2016, Canadian Surgeon General Brigadier General Hugh Colin MacKay told a parliamentary committee that faulty science supported the assertion that the drug has permanent noxious side effects. An expert from Health Canada named Barbara Raymond told the same committee that the evidence she had read failed to support the conclusion of permanent side effects. Canadian soldiers who took mefloquine when deployed overseas have claimed they have been left with ongoing mental health problems.

In 2020 the UK Ministry of Defence (MoD) admitted to a breach of duty regarding the use of Mefloquine, acknowledging numerous instances of failure to assess the risks and warn of potential side effects of the drug.

== Research ==
In June 2010, the first case report appeared of a progressive multifocal leukoencephalopathy being successfully treated with mefloquine. Mefloquine can also act against the JC virus. Administration of mefloquine seemed to eliminate the virus from the patient's body and prevented further neurological deterioration.

Mefloquine alters cholinergic synaptic transmission through both postsynaptic and presynaptic actions. The postsynaptic action to inhibit acetylcholinesterase changes transmission across synapses in the brain.

== In popular culture ==
The powerful side effects of Lariam are depicted in Ann Patchett's novel State of Wonder.
