= 10,11-Seco-LSD =

Clinical data
- Other names: UCD0121; "[0124]"; 9,10-Didehydro-N,N-diethyl-6-methyl-10,11-secoergoline-8β-carboxamide
- Drug class: Partial ergoline
- ATC code: None

Identifiers
- CAS Number: 2640392-96-5

Chemical and physical data
- 3D model (JSmol): Interactive image
- SMILES: O=C([C@@]1C=C[C@@]([H])(CC2=CN([H])C3=CC=CC=C23)N(C)C1)N(CC)CC
- InChI: InChI=1S/C20H26N3O/c1-4-23(5-2)20(24)15-10-11-17(22(3)14-15)12-16-13-21-19-9-7-6-8-18(16)19/h6-11,13,17,21H,4-5,12,14H2,1-3H3/t17-/m0/s1; Key:CGFPZODXTFFRAH-KRWDZBQOSA-N

10,11-Seco-LSD, also known as UCD0121, is a partial lysergamide and cyclized tryptamine related to lysergic acid diethylamide (LSD). It is the seco analogue of LSD in which the bond between the 10 and 11 positions of the ergoline ring system has been broken. 10,11-Seco-LSD was described in a patent by David E. Olson and colleagues at Delix Therapeutics in 2021. Subsequently, 10,11-seco-LSD was further described by Olson and colleagues in the scientific literature in 2026.

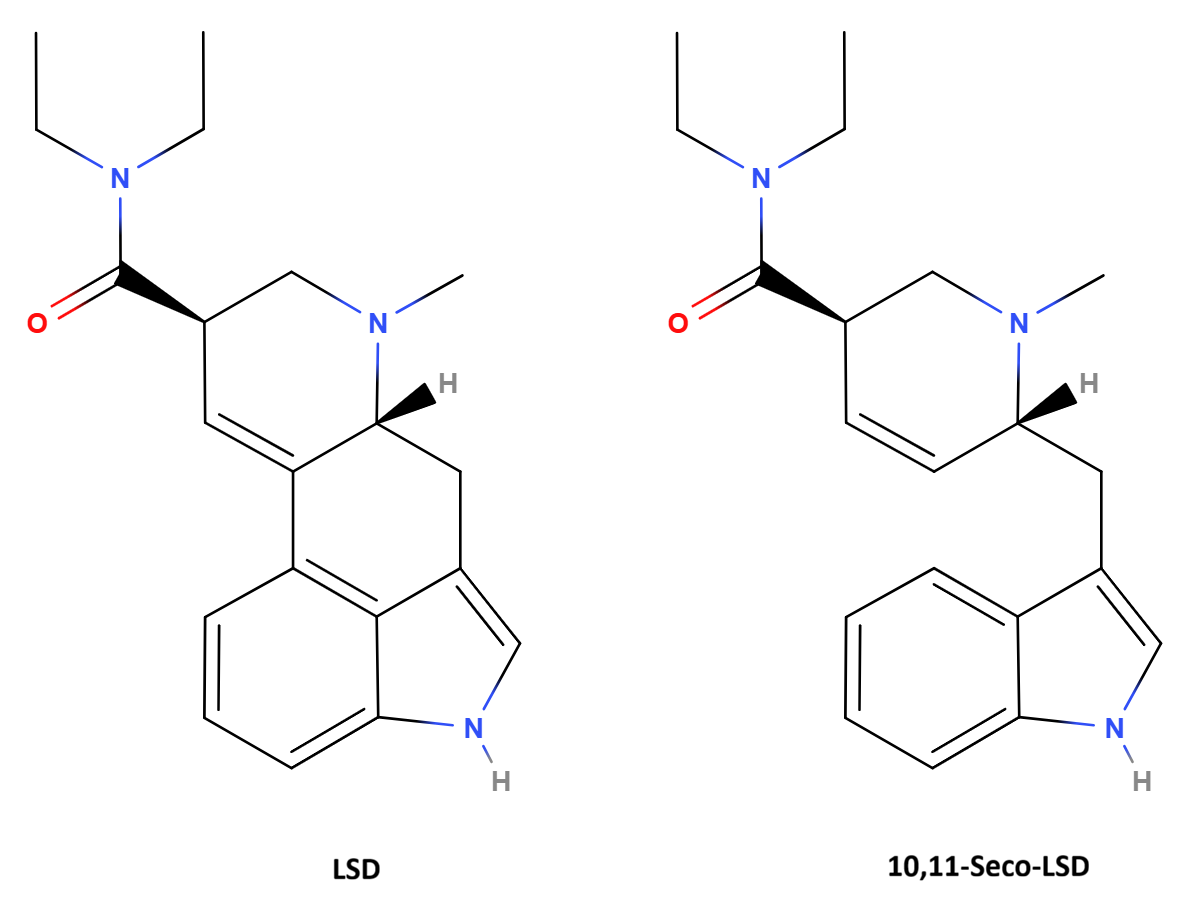
LSD (left) and 10,11-seco-LSD (right) chemical structures.

== See also ==
- Partial lysergamide
- Seco-LSD
- Secoergoline
- NDTDI (8,10-seco-LSD)
- UCD0179 (3,5-seco-LSD)
- Mefloquine
