= Pyr-T =

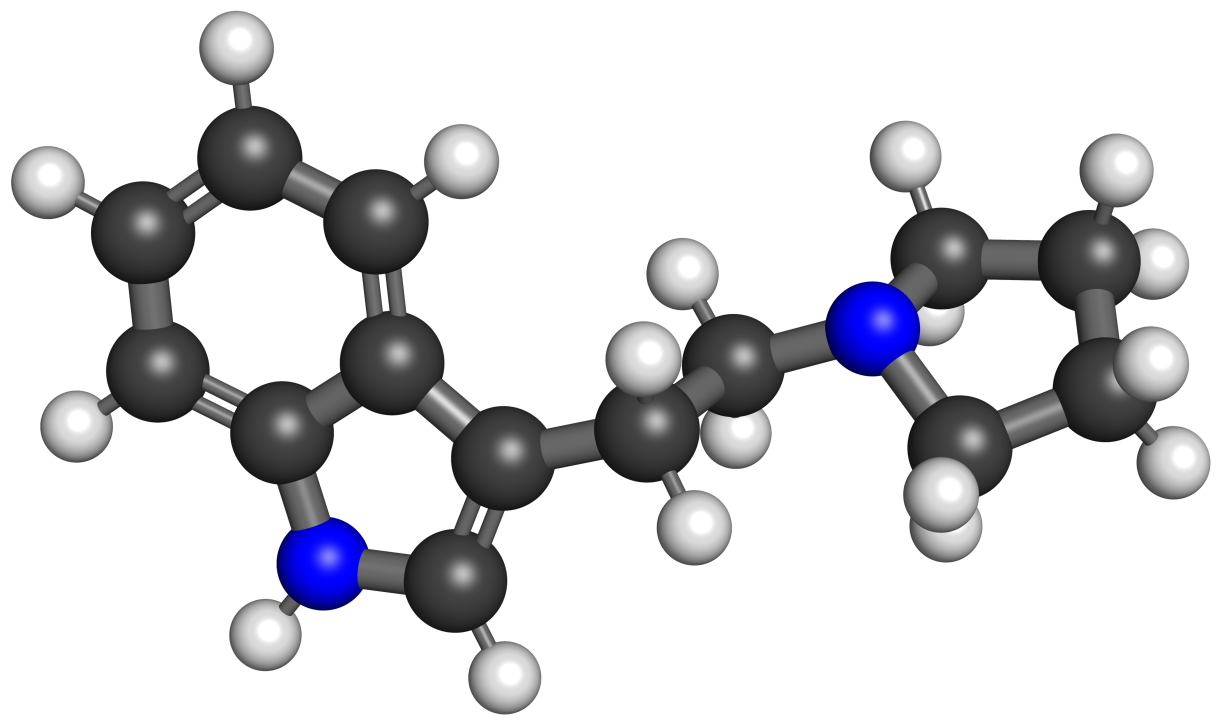

Clinical data
- Other names: N,N-Tetramethylenetryptamine; N,N-Pyrrolidinyltryptamine; Pyrrolidinyltryptamine; Pyr-Tryptamine; 3-(2-Pyrrolidinoethyl)indole
- Routes of administration: Oral, inhalation
- Drug class: Serotonin receptor modulator
- ATC code: None

Identifiers
- IUPAC name: 3-[2-(pyrrolidin-1-yl)ethyl]-1H-indole
- CAS Number: 14008-96-9
- PubChem CID: 26393
- ChemSpider: 24588
- UNII: VZ689W7HWX
- CompTox Dashboard (EPA): DTXSID00161226

Chemical and physical data
- Formula: C_{14}H_{18}N_{2}
- Molar mass: 214.312 g·mol^{−1}
- 3D model (JSmol): Interactive image
- Melting point: 193 to 194 °C (379 to 381 °F) (hydrochloride salt)
- Boiling point: 170 to 180 °C (338 to 356 °F) (freebase at 0.05 mm/Hg)
- SMILES: c2c(c1ccccc1[nH]2)CCN3CCCC3
- InChI: InChI=1S/C14H18N2/c1-2-6-14-13(5-1)12(11-15-14)7-10-16-8-3-4-9-16/h1-2,5-6,11,15H,3-4,7-10H2; Key:CVTZCBLFHNGYDQ-UHFFFAOYSA-N

Pyr-T, also known as N,N-tetramethylenetryptamine or as 3-(2-pyrrolidinoethyl)indole, is a lesser-known serotonin receptor modulator of the tryptamine and pyrrolidinylethylindole families. It is the cyclized derivative of diethyltryptamine (DET) in which the N,N-diethyl groups have been fused into a pyrrolidine ring.

== Use and effects ==
In his 1997 book TiHKAL (Tryptamines I Have Known and Loved), Alexander Shulgin reported neither the dose range nor the duration of the drug. However, individual experiments employed 25 to 50 mg orally and 70 mg smoked. Pyr-T produced effects including malaise, feeling sick, unpleasantness, salivation, muscle and joint pains, dizziness, feeling high, and uncomfortableness. Hallucinogenic effects, for instance visuals, were either absent or minor.

== Pharmacology ==
=== Pharmacodynamics ===
Pyr-T has been found to show affinity for serotonin receptors, including the serotonin 5-HT_{1A}, 5-HT_{2A} and 5-HT_{2C} receptors. Its affinities (IC_{50}) for these receptors were 30 nM for the serotonin 5-HT_{1A} receptor, 110 nM for the 5-HT_{2A} receptor, and 750 nM for the serotonin 5-HT_{2B} receptor. The affinities of pyr-T for the serotonin 5-HT_{2A} and 5-HT_{2B} receptors were similar to but slightly lower than those of dimethyltryptamine (DMT), whereas its affinity for the serotonin 5-HT_{1A} receptor was 5.7-fold higher than that of DMT and was intermediate between those of DMT and 5-MeO-DMT. The serotonin 5-HT_{1A} to 5-HT_{2A} receptor affinity ratios in the study were about 0.27 for pyr-T, 0.5 for 5-MeO-DMT, 1.4 for bufotenin, 2.3 for DMT, and 32 for psilocin. Pyr-T is a serotonin receptor agonist in the rat uterus and stomach strip, with similar potency as dimethyltryptamine (DMT).

Pyr-T has been found to produce behavioral changes in animal tests. It was described as being as potent as diethyltryptamine (DET) in rodents, cats, and primates, but that it also had a poor margin of activity relative to toxicity and was unlikely to be tested in humans. It has been found to produce hypolocomotion in rodents. Conversely, pyr-T (3 mg/kg) failed to acutely produce the head-twitch response, a behavioral proxy of psychedelic effects, in rodents.

== Chemistry ==
Pyr-T is a pyrrolidinylethylindole and a substituted tryptamine in which the amine moiety has been replaced with a pyrrolidine ring. It can be thought of as a cyclized derivative of diethyltryptamine (DET) in which the N,N-ethyl groups have been connected to form the pyrrolidine ring present in pyr-T.

=== Synthesis ===
The chemical synthesis of pyr-T has been described.

=== Analogues ===
Derivatives of pyr-T include 4-HO-pyr-T, 5-MeO-pyr-T, and 4-F-5-MeO-pyr-T. Analogues of pyr-T include pip-tryptamine, 10,11-secoergoline (α,N-Pip-T), MPMI, and SN-22, among others.

== History ==
Pyr-T was first characterized by Mitzal by 1962. Animal toxicity testing was later performed by Hunt and Brimblecombe by 1967. The effects of pyr-T in humans were described by Alexander Shulgin in his book TiHKAL in 1997.

== See also ==
- Pyrrolidinylethylindole
- Cyclized tryptamine
