= Secoergoline =

Ergoline ring system numbered and labeled.

Secoergoline is an analogue of ergoline with one or more bonds removed and may refer to:

- 3,5-Secoergoline (RU-27251)
- 8,10-Secoergoline (e.g., 8,10-seco-LSD (NDTDI))
- 10,11-Secoergoline (e.g., 10,11-seco-LSD (UCD0121), CT-5252)

Other secoergolines include partial clavines like chanoclavine and paliclavine.

== See also ==
- Seco-LSD
- Partial ergoline
- Ergoline
- Secosteroid
