= AL-37350A =

Chemical compound

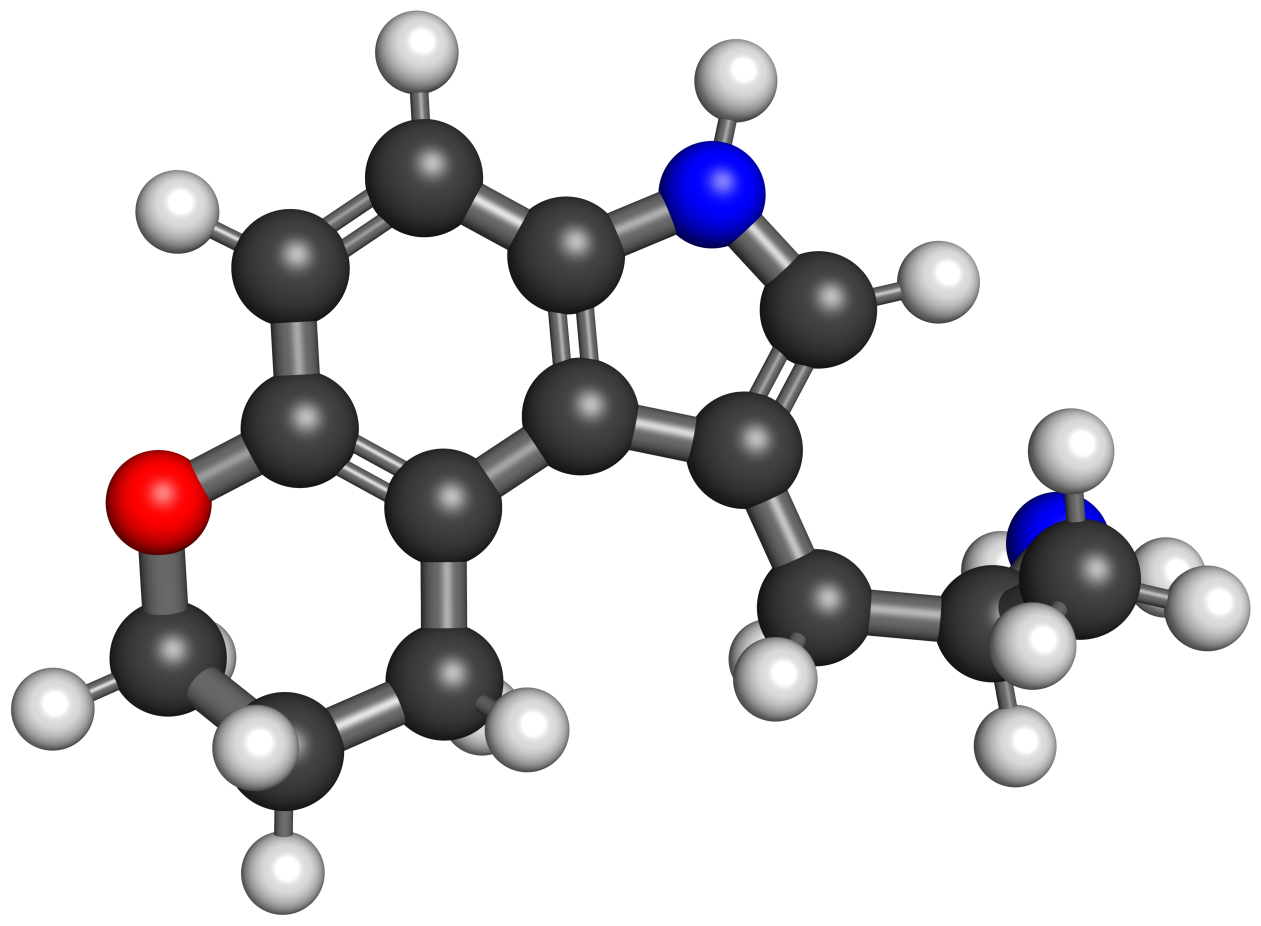

Clinical data
- Other names: 4,5-DHP-AMT; 4,5-Dihydropyrano-AMT; 4,5-Dihydropyrano-α-methyltryptamine
- Drug class: Serotonin receptor modulator; Serotonin 5-HT_{2A} receptor agonist
- ATC code: None

Identifiers
- IUPAC name: (S)-(+)-1-(2-aminopropyl)-8,9-dihydropyrano[3,2-e]indole
- CAS Number: 362603-40-5
- PubChem CID: 10331436
- IUPHAR/BPS: 160
- ChemSpider: 8506896
- UNII: KT54N4CC67
- ChEMBL: ChEMBL133455
- CompTox Dashboard (EPA): DTXSID501350247 DTXSID10438239, DTXSID501350247

Chemical and physical data
- Formula: C_{14}H_{18}N_{2}O
- Molar mass: 230.311 g·mol^{−1}
- 3D model (JSmol): Interactive image
- SMILES: O2c1ccc3c(c1CCC2)c(c[nH]3)C[C@@H](N)C
- InChI: InChI=1S/C14H18N2O/c1-9(15)7-10-8-16-12-4-5-13-11(14(10)12)3-2-6-17-13/h4-5,8-9,16H,2-3,6-7,15H2,1H3/t9-/m0/s1; Key:VVHJUSGIUWQPIT-VIFPVBQESA-N

AL-37350A, also known as 4,5-dihydropyrano-α-methyltryptamine (4,5-DHP-AMT), is a serotonin receptor agonist and tricyclic tryptamine derivative related to the psychedelic tryptamine 5-MeO-AMT. It acts as a potent and selective agonist for the serotonin receptor 5-HT_{2A}, with a K_{i} of 2.0 nM, and moderate selectivity over the related 5-HT_{2B} and 5-HT_{2C} receptors. The drug has been shown to have ocular hypotensive activity in animal models, suggesting it may be useful for the treatment of glaucoma. AL-37350A was first described in the scientific literature by Jesse May and colleagues in 2003.

== See also ==
- Substituted tryptamine
- AL-38022A
- CP-132,484
- 4,5-DHP-DMT
- Ramelteon
