= 4,5-DHP-DMT =

Chemical compound

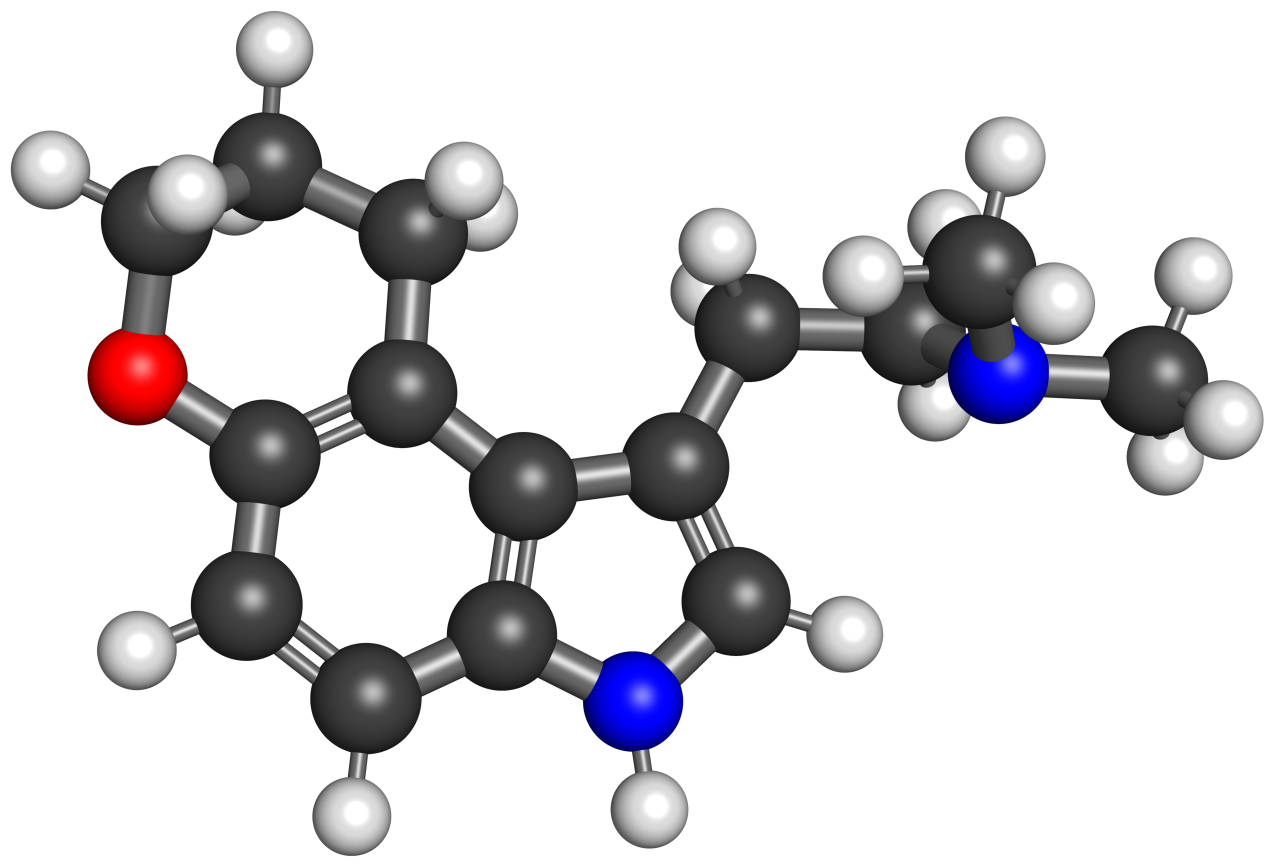

Clinical data
- Other names: 4,5-Dihydropyrano-N,N-dimethyltryptamine

Identifiers
- IUPAC name: 1-(2-Dimethylaminoethyl)-8,9-dihydropyrano[3,2-e]indole
- CAS Number: 135360-97-3
- PubChem CID: 15011385
- ChemSpider: 19425248
- UNII: UW9YPK64EU
- ChEMBL: ChEMBL412876
- CompTox Dashboard (EPA): DTXSID10566920

Chemical and physical data
- Formula: C_{15}H_{20}N_{2}O
- Molar mass: 244.338 g·mol^{−1}
- 3D model (JSmol): Interactive image
- SMILES: CN(C)CCc1c[nH]c3ccc2OCCCc2c13
- InChI: InChI=1S/C15H20N2O/c1-17(2)8-7-11-10-16-13-5-6-14-12(15(11)13)4-3-9-18-14/h5-6,10,16H,3-4,7-9H2,1-2H3; Key:RMMYVKPVLLBYDW-UHFFFAOYSA-N

4,5-DHP-DMT, also known as 4,5-dihydropyrano-N,N-dimethyltryptamine, is a tricyclic tryptamine derivative which acts as a potent and reasonably selective partial agonist for the serotonin receptor 5-HT_{2A}, with a K_{i} of 17.0 nM, and moderate selectivity over related serotonin receptors. It has lower 5-HT_{2} affinity and efficacy than the related compound AL-37350A, but higher lipophilicity.

== See also ==
- Substituted tryptamine
- 4,5-MDO-DMT
- 4,5-MDO-DiPT
- 5-MeO-DMT
- CP-132,484
- RU-28306
- Ramelteon
