= CP-132,484 =

Chemical compound

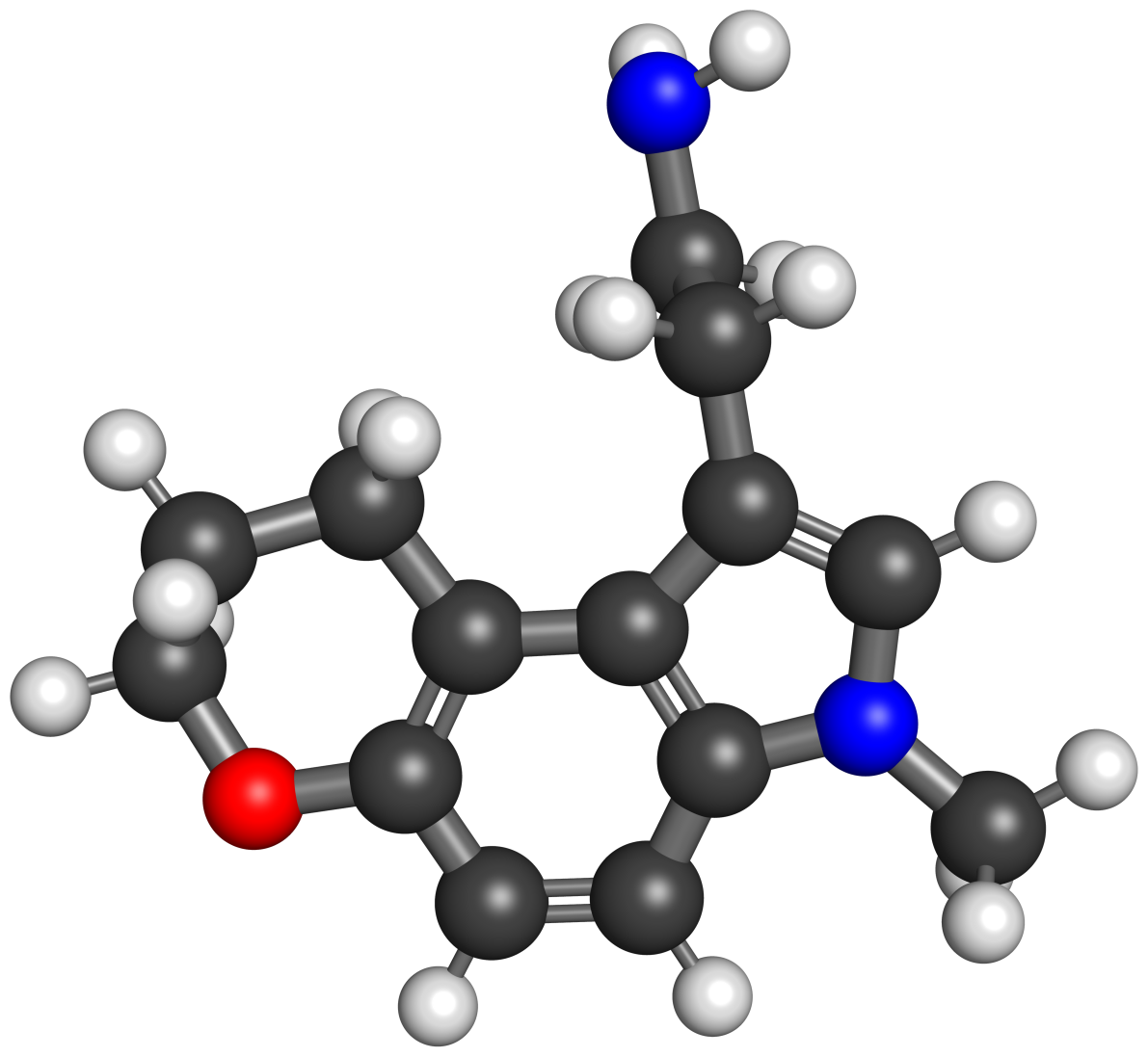

Clinical data
- Other names: 4,5-Dihydropyrano-1-methyltryptamine; 4,5-DHP-1-Me-T; 4,5-DHP-1-methyl-T

Identifiers
- IUPAC name: 1-(2-aminoethyl)-3-methyl-8,9-dihydropyrano(3,2-e)indole
- CAS Number: 143508-76-3
- PubChem CID: 132564
- ChemSpider: 117043
- UNII: F7483B89JC
- ChEMBL: ChEMBL25800
- CompTox Dashboard (EPA): DTXSID00162450

Chemical and physical data
- Formula: C_{14}H_{18}N_{2}O
- Molar mass: 230.311 g·mol^{−1}
- 3D model (JSmol): Interactive image
- SMILES: Cn1cc(c2c1ccc3c2CCCO3)CCN
- InChI: InChI=1S/C14H18N2O/c1-16-9-10(6-7-15)14-11-3-2-8-17-13(11)5-4-12(14)16/h4-5,9H,2-3,6-8,15H2,1H3; Key:CCGPJPFGXFZHAJ-UHFFFAOYSA-N

CP-132,484, also known as 4,5-dihydropyrano-1-methyltryptamine (4,5-DHP-1-Me-T), is a tryptamine derivative which acts as a potent and selective agonist for the 5-HT_{2} family of serotonin receptors. It has reasonable selectivity for 5-HT_{2A} and 5-HT_{2C} subtypes over 5-HT_{2B}, but is only slightly selective for 5-HT_{2A} over 5-HT_{2C}. This compound and several related analogues have been shown to have ocular hypotensive activity in animal models, suggesting they may be useful for the treatment of glaucoma.

== See also ==
- AL-37350A
- AL-38022A
- 1-Methyltryptamine
- Lespedamine
- 1-Methylpsilocin
- 4,5-DHP-DMT
