= 5-MeO-pyr-T =

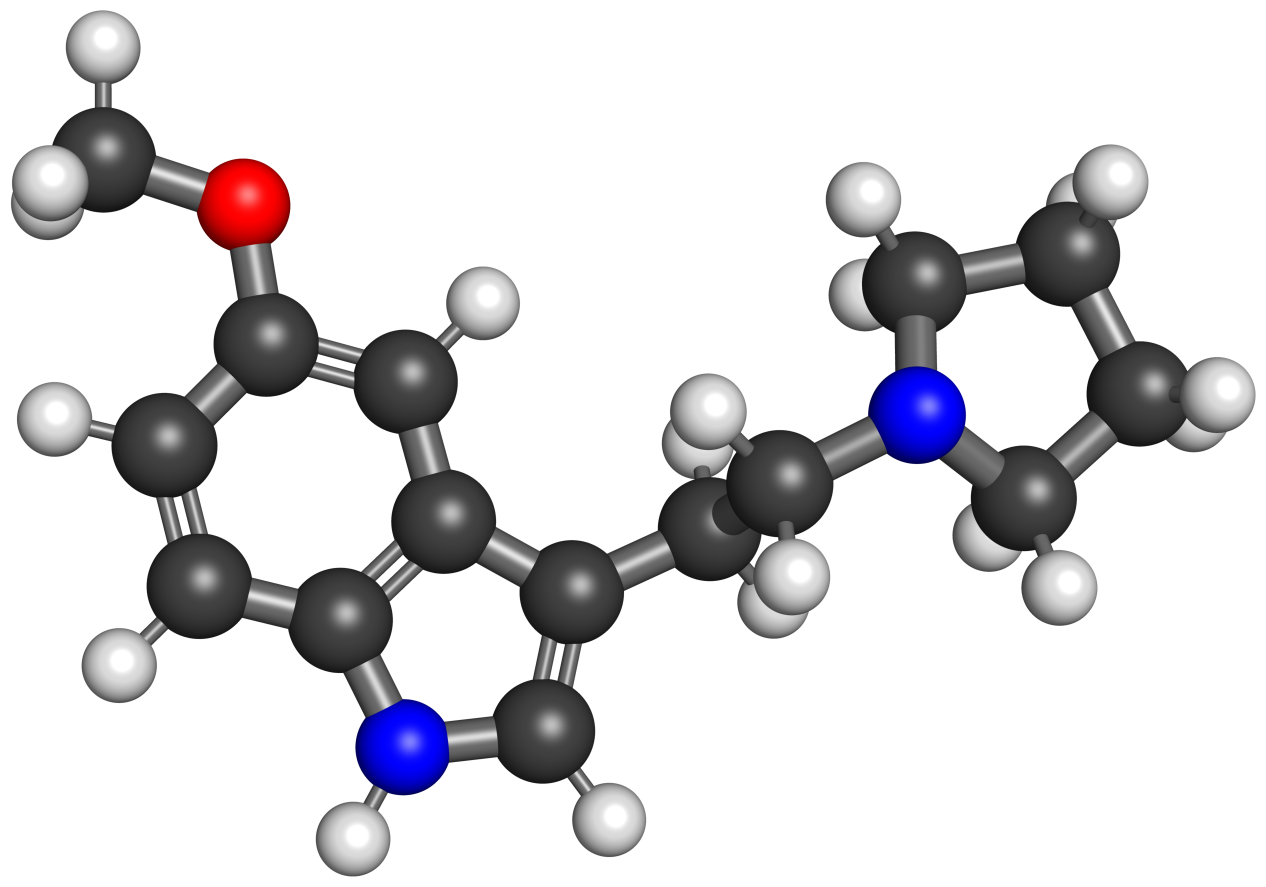

Clinical data
- Other names: 5-Methoxy-N,N-tetramethylenetryptamine; 5-Methoxy-3-(2-pyrrolidinoethyl)indole; 1-[2-(5-Methoxy-1H-indol-3-yl)ethyl]pyrrolidine; "Pyrrolidyl-5-methoxytryptamine"; "5-Methoxypyrrolidine-tryptamine"
- Routes of administration: Oral, smoking
- Drug class: Serotonin receptor modulator; 5-HT_{1A} receptor agonist; Serotonergic psychedelic; Hallucinogen
- ATC code: None

Legal status
- Legal status: US: Unregulated

Pharmacokinetic data
- Duration of action: "Several hours"

Identifiers
- IUPAC name: 5-methoxy-3-[2-(pyrrolidin-1-yl)ethyl]-1H-indole
- CAS Number: 3949-14-2 2426-65-5 (hydrochloride)
- PubChem CID: 17053
- ChemSpider: 16153
- UNII: L6Q3U897DF
- ChEMBL: ChEMBL608537
- CompTox Dashboard (EPA): DTXSID50192626

Chemical and physical data
- Formula: C_{15}H_{20}N_{2}O
- Molar mass: 244.338 g·mol^{−1}
- 3D model (JSmol): Interactive image
- Melting point: 164 to 167 °C (327 to 333 °F) (hydrochloride salt)
- Boiling point: 160 to 170 °C (320 to 338 °F) (freebase at 0.05 mm/Hg)
- SMILES: O(c3ccc1c(c(c[nH]1)CCN2CCCC2)c3)C
- InChI: InChI=1S/C15H20N2O/c1-18-13-4-5-15-14(10-13)12(11-16-15)6-9-17-7-2-3-8-17/h4-5,10-11,16H,2-3,6-9H2,1H3; Key:KAASYKNZNPWPQG-UHFFFAOYSA-N

5-MeO-pyr-T, also known as 5-methoxy-N,N-tetramethylenetryptamine or as 5-methoxy-3-(2-pyrrolidinoethyl)indole, is a serotonin receptor modulator and psychedelic drug of the tryptamine, 5-methoxytryptamine, and pyrrolidinylethylindole families. It is the 5-methoxy analogue of pyr-T and the derivative of 5-MeO-DMT and 5-MeO-DET in which their N,N-dialkyl groups have been cyclized into a pyrrolidine ring.

The drug acts primarily as a highly potent serotonin 5-HT_{1A} receptor agonist, with much lower activity at the serotonin 5-HT_{2A} receptor and other serotonin receptors. 5-MeO-pyr-T shows far greater selectivity for the serotonin 5-HT_{1A} receptor than 5-MeO-DMT.

5-MeO-pyr-T was first described in the scientific literature by 1962.

== Use and effects ==
In his book TiHKAL, Alexander Shulgin gives the dose of 5-MeO-pyr-T as 0.5 to 2 mg orally and its duration as "several hours". It was also assessed at doses of 1 to 4 mg smoked.

The drug's effects were dose-dependent and variably included intense tinnitus (ear ringing), nausea and vomiting, miosis (pupil constriction), confusion or cognitive impairment, uncomfortableness, minor dysphoria, partial to complete amnesia, flailing, rolling about, quivering, and shaking, unconsciousness, and prolonged hangover. Reports of psychedelic-like effects were mixed, ranging from producing no closed-eye visuals and none of the "shifting shapes, colors and forms" of dimethyltryptamine (DMT) or the clarity or energy of 5-MeO-DMT, to producing a rush, being "intense but not terrifying", initially 5-MeO-DMT-like, ego death, full body buzz, humming resonance, and feeling that "God is love". Other notable comments included "absolute poison", "never again", "very negative", "felt as if the top of my head was blown off", user's actions being scary and others being alarmed, wandering the streets in a fugue state, and the drug being "some weird-ass shit". Its effects have also been described as "white-out" analogously to 5-MeO-DMT and with amplified amnesic effects compared to 5-MeO-DMT.

The effects of 5-MeO-pyr-T appear to be highly variable between individuals. It was described as being very different from other psychedelics and it was emphasized that a trip sitter is essential for 5-MeO-pyr-T. Shulgin has also described 5-MeO-pyr-T as being "not hallucinogenic" and instead as producing "long-lived amnesia and unconsciousness".

== Pharmacology ==
=== Pharmacodynamics ===
5-MeO-pyr-T shows very high affinity for the serotonin 5-HT_{1A} receptor and much lower affinity or activity at other assessed serotonin receptors. At the serotonin 5-HT_{1A} receptor, it had an affinity (K_{i}) of 0.577 nM and an activational potency (EC_{50}) of 2.40 nM. These values were respectively 646-fold and 34-fold more potent than at the serotonin 5-HT_{2A} receptor (K_{i} = 373 nM, EC_{50} = 13.5–81.3 nM (depending on assay), E_{max} = 92%). In other studies, it was a partial agonist of the serotonin 5-HT_{2A} receptor, with an EC_{50} of 692 nM and an E_{max} of 73%. In addition, it was a partial agonist of the serotonin 5-HT_{4} receptor in the rat esophagus, with an EC_{50} of 355 nM and an E_{max} of 53%. The drug has also been predicted to bind to the serotonin 5-HT_{7} receptor, with a predicted affinity (K_{i}) of 631 nM. In one study, relative to 5-MeO-DMT, 5-MeO-pyr-T had 12-fold greater activational potency at the serotonin 5-HT_{1A} receptor and 3-fold reduced activational potency at the serotonin 5-HT_{2A} receptor, with 38-fold increased selectivity for the serotonin 5-HT_{1A} receptor over the serotonin 5-HT_{2A} receptor.

Besides the serotonin receptors, 5-MeO-pyr-T is very weakly active at the serotonin transporter (SERT). It showed an affinity (K_{i}) for the SERT of 3,006 nM and an inhibitory potency (IC_{50}) in terms of serotonin reuptake inhibition of 2,765 nM. Additionally, 5-MeO-pyr-T is a substrate of the SERT and acts as a partial serotonin releasing agent in HEK293 cells, with an EC_{50} of 5,700 nM.

In early literature, 5-MeO-pyr-T was described as the most potent tryptamine yet evaluated in the open-field test, but as also having high toxicity that would likely preclude evaluation in humans. In subsequent modern studies, 5-MeO-pyr-T produced effects in rodents including the head-twitch response (a behavioral proxy of psychedelic effects), hypothermia, and hypolocomotion. Its median effective dose (ED_{50}) for producing the head-twitch response was slightly higher than that of 5-MeO-DMT (7.29 mg/kg vs. 4.84 mg/kg, respectively), whereas it was much less efficacious in inducing the response compared to 5-MeO-DMT and produced only a weak maximal effect (10.0 events vs. 38.1 events, respectively). 5-MeO-pyr-T was also similarly potent as 5-MeO-DMT in producing hypothermia and hypolocomotion, but conversely showed greater maximal responses for both of these effects.

== Chemistry ==
=== Synthesis ===
The chemical synthesis of 5-MeO-pyr-T has been described.

=== Analogues ===
Analogues of 5-MeO-pyr-T include pyr-T, 4-HO-pyr-T, 4-F-5-MeO-pyr-T, 5-MeO-DMT, and 5-MeO-DET, among others. Analogues of 5-MeO-pyr-T (pyrrolidine) with different rings, including 5-MeO-pip-T (piperidine) and 5-MeO-mor-T (morpholine), are also known, but have not been tested in humans.

== History ==
5-MeO-pyr-T was first characterized by Mitzal by 1962. Animal studies were later published by Hunt and Brimblecombe in 1967. The effects of 5-MeO-pyr-T in humans were described by Alexander Shulgin in his book TiHKAL in 1997. Robert Oberlender, from the lab of David E. Nichols at Purdue University, is known to have accidentally taken too high of a dose of 5-MeO-pyr-T and wandered outside in a fugue state. His experience was later included as the highest-dose 5-MeO-pyr-T experience report in TiHKAL. The drug was encountered as a novel designer and recreational drug in Europe by 2017. 5-MeO-pyr-T's pharmacology was more fully characterized in modern studies in 2009, 2023, and 2024.

== Society and culture ==
=== Legal status ===
==== Canada ====
5-MeO-pyr-T is a controlled substance in Canada.

==== United States ====
5-MeO-pyr-T is not an explicitly controlled substance in the United States. However, it could be considered a controlled substance under the Federal Analogue Act if intended for human consumption.

== See also ==
- Pyrrolidinylethylindole
- Cyclized tryptamine
