= 4-HO-pyr-T =

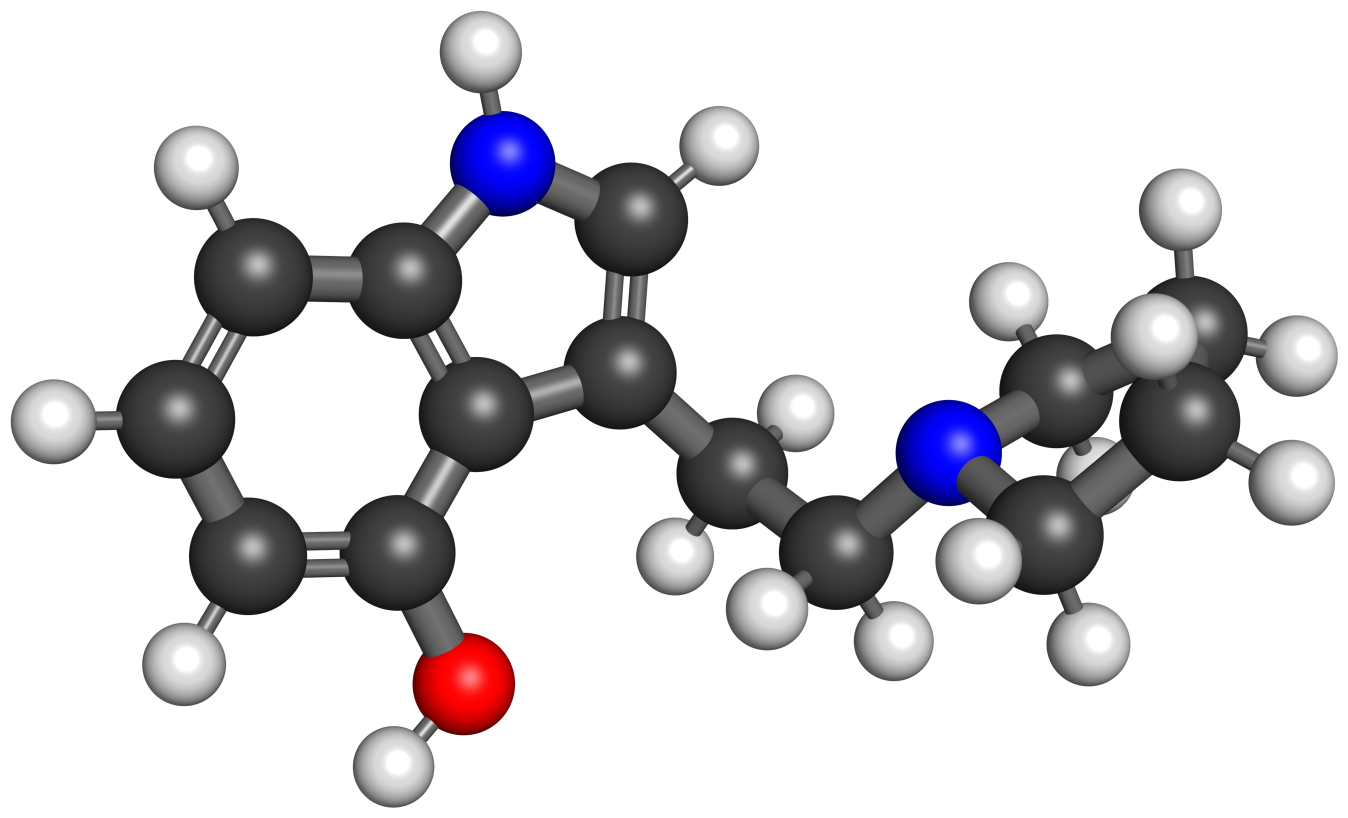

Clinical data
- Other names: 4-OH-pyr-T; 4-Hydroxy-pyr-tryptamine; 4-Hydroxy-N,N-tetramethylenetryptamine; 1-[2-[3-(4-Hydroxy)indolyl]ethyl]pyrrolidine; 4-Hydroxypyrrolidyltryptamine; 3-[2-(1-Pyrrolidyl)ethyl]-4-indolol
- Drug class: Serotonin receptor modulator
- ATC code: None

Identifiers
- IUPAC name: 3-[2-(pyrrolidin-1-yl)ethyl]-1H-indol-4-ol
- CAS Number: 63097-26-7
- PubChem CID: 21854226
- ChemSpider: 10579820
- UNII: 55L8SYC7EQ
- ChEMBL: ChEMBL364061
- CompTox Dashboard (EPA): DTXSID101024292

Chemical and physical data
- Formula: C_{14}H_{18}N_{2}O
- Molar mass: 230.311 g·mol^{−1}
- 3D model (JSmol): Interactive image
- SMILES: Oc2cccc3[nH]cc(CCN1CCCC1)c23
- InChI: InChI=1S/C14H18N2O/c17-13-5-3-4-12-14(13)11(10-15-12)6-9-16-7-1-2-8-16/h3-5,10,15,17H,1-2,6-9H2; Key:XASLPZWIPBCAPF-UHFFFAOYSA-N

4-HO-pyr-T, also known as 4-hydroxy-N,N-tetramethylenetryptamine, is a serotonin receptor modulator of the tryptamine, 4-hydroxytryptamine, and pyrrolidinylethylindole families. It is the 4-hydroxyl analogue of pyr-T and the analogue of psilocin (4-HO-DMT) and 4-HO-DET in which the N,N-dialkyl moiety has been cyclized into a pyrrolidine ring.

== Use and effects ==
In his book TiHKAL (Tryptamines I Have Known and Loved), Shulgin gives the dose as ≥20 mg orally, its duration as unknown, and its onset as about 3 hours. It was described as quite unlike psilocin and bordering on bizarre. There were minimal visual disturbances and no alterations in colors or objects. It was however said to heighten the intellectual process. The drug was said to be more "stimulant-like" than hallucinogenic or psychedelic. 4-HO-pyr-T was described as very unpleasant.

== Pharmacology ==
=== Pharmacodynamics ===
4-HO-pyr-T has been found to interact with serotonin receptors, including the serotonin 5-HT_{2A}, 5-HT_{2B}, and 5-HT_{2C} receptors. Its affinities (K_{i}) were 429 nM for the serotonin 5-HT_{2A} receptor, 423 nM for the serotonin 5-HT_{2B} receptor, and 275 to 1,772 nM for the serotonin 5-HT_{2C} receptor. Functional activities at these receptors were not assessed or reported.

== Chemistry ==
=== Synthesis ===
The chemical synthesis of 4-HO-pyr-T has been described.

=== Analogues ===
Analogues of 4-HO-pyr-T include pyr-T, 5-MeO-pyr-T, and 4-F-5-MeO-pyr-T, among others.

Derivatives and analogues of 4-HO-pyr-T, for instance analogues with an azetidine instead of pyrrolidine ring, have been synthesized and described.

== History ==
4-HO-pyr-T was first described in the scientific literature by David Repke and colleagues by 1977. Its effects in humans were subsequently described by Alexander Shulgin in his book TiHKAL (Tryptamines I Have Known and Loved) in 1997.

== See also ==
- Pyrrolidinylethylindole
- Cyclized tryptamine
