= CP-135807 =

Chemical compound

Identifiers
- IUPAC name: 3-([(2R)-1-methylpyrrolidin-2-yl]methyl)-N-(3-nitropyridin-2-yl)-1H-indol-5-amine
- CAS Number: 151272-90-1
- PubChem CID: 5487088
- ChemSpider: 4589207
- UNII: TE348FQ6DA
- ChEMBL: ChEMBL80913
- CompTox Dashboard (EPA): DTXSID10164748
- ECHA InfoCard: 100.189.849

Chemical and physical data
- Formula: C_{19}H_{21}N_{5}O_{2}
- Molar mass: 351.410 g·mol^{−1}
- 3D model (JSmol): Interactive image
- SMILES: CN1CCC[C@@H]1Cc2c[nH]c3c2cc(cc3)Nc4c(cccn4)[N+](=O)[O-]
- InChI: InChI=1S/C19H21N5O2/c1-23-9-3-4-15(23)10-13-12-21-17-7-6-14(11-16(13)17)22-19-18(24(25)26)5-2-8-20-19/h2,5-8,11-12,15,21H,3-4,9-10H2,1H3,(H,20,22)/t15-/m1/s1; Key:YPFIYPNOWVPAPR-OAHLLOKOSA-N

CP-135807 is a pyrrolidinylmethylindole and cyclized tryptamine derivative which acts as a potent and selective agonist for the 5-HT_{1D} serotonin receptor, and is used to study the function of this receptor subtype.

== See also ==
- Pyrrolidinylmethylindole
- Cyclized tryptamine
- 4-HO-MPMI
- 5-MeO-MPMI
- Eletriptan
- LY-334370
