= Eletriptan =

Chemical compound

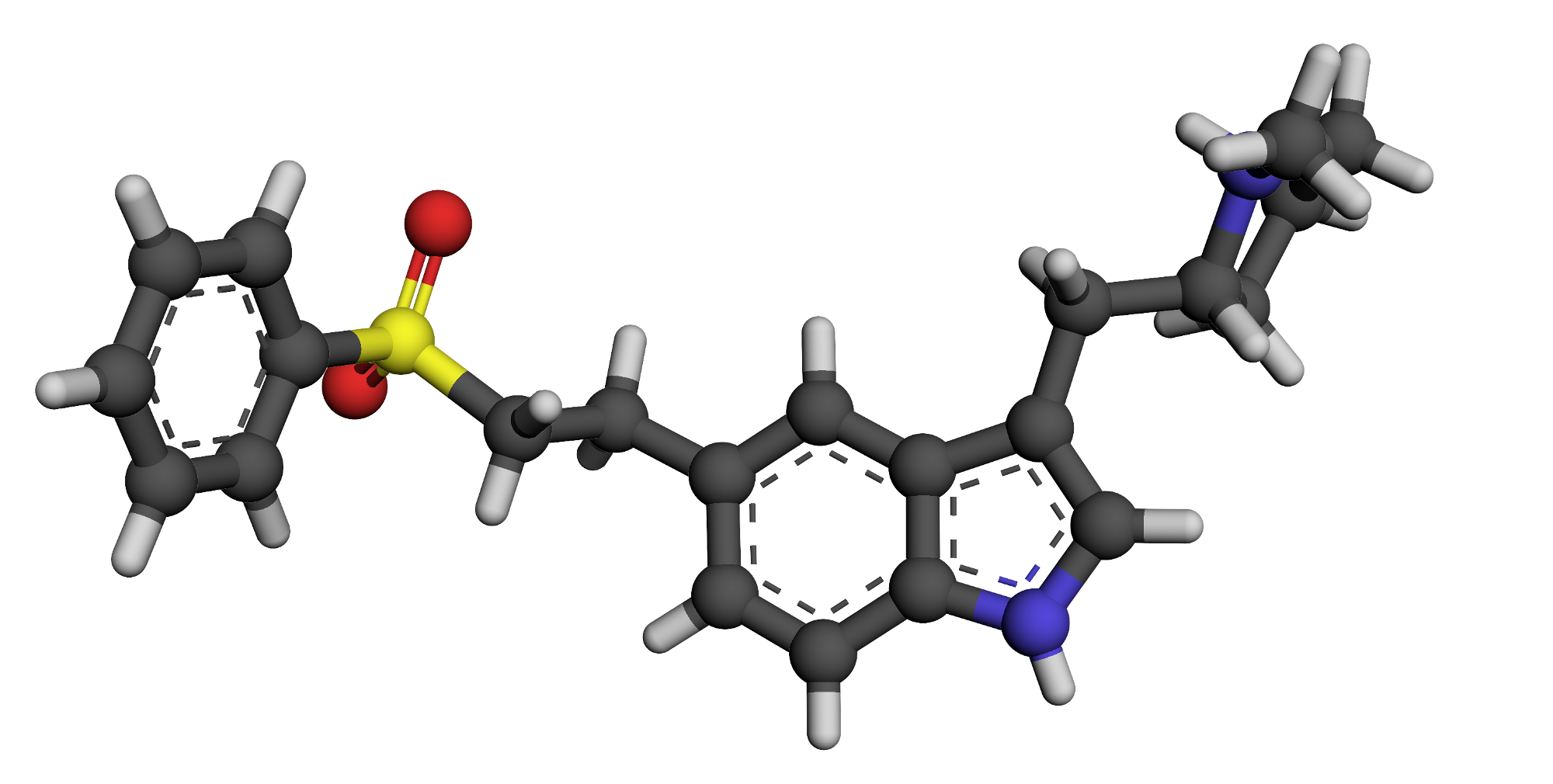

Clinical data
- Trade names: Relpax, others
- Other names: UK-116044; UK116044
- AHFS/Drugs.com: Monograph
- MedlinePlus: a603029
- License data: US DailyMed: Eletriptan
- Pregnancy category: AU: B1
- Routes of administration: By mouth
- Drug class: Serotonin 5-HT_{1B}, 5-HT_{1D}, 5-HT_{1E}, and 5-HT_{1F} receptor agonist; Triptan; Antimigraine agent
- ATC code: N02CC06 (WHO)

Legal status
- Legal status: AU: S3 (Pharmacist only) & S4; CA: ℞-only; UK: POM (Prescription only); US: ℞-only; In general: ℞ (Prescription only)

Pharmacokinetic data
- Bioavailability: 50%
- Metabolism: Mainly CYP3A4
- Elimination half-life: 4 hours

Identifiers
- IUPAC name: 3-{[(2R)-1-methylpyrrolidin-2-yl]methyl}-5-[2-(benzenesulfonyl)ethyl]-1H-indole
- CAS Number: 143322-58-1; HBr: 177834-92-3
- PubChem CID: 77993; HBr: 656631
- IUPHAR/BPS: 40
- DrugBank: DB00216; HBr: DBSALT000884
- ChemSpider: 70379; HBr: 570985
- UNII: 22QOO9B8KI; HBr: M41W832TA3
- KEGG: D07887; HBr: D01973
- ChEBI: CHEBI:50922; HBr: CHEBI:61176
- ChEMBL: ChEMBL1510; HBr: ChEMBL1201003
- CompTox Dashboard (EPA): DTXSID9046861
- ECHA InfoCard: 100.167.337

Chemical and physical data
- Formula: C_{22}H_{26}N_{2}O_{2}S
- Molar mass: 382.52 g·mol^{−1}
- 3D model (JSmol): Interactive image
- SMILES: CN1CCC[C@@H]1Cc3c[nH]c4ccc(CCS(=O)(=O)c2ccccc2)cc34
- InChI: InChI=1S/C22H26N2O2S/c1-24-12-5-6-19(24)15-18-16-23-22-10-9-17(14-21(18)22)11-13-27(25,26)20-7-3-2-4-8-20/h2-4,7-10,14,16,19,23H,5-6,11-13,15H2,1H3/t19-/m1/s1; Key:PWVXXGRKLHYWKM-LJQANCHMSA-N

Eletriptan, sold under the brand name Relpax and used in the form of eletriptan hydrobromide, is a second-generation triptan medication intended for treatment of migraine headaches. It is used as an abortive medication, blocking a migraine attack which is already in progress. Eletriptan is marketed and manufactured by Pfizer.

Eletriptan is a therapeutic alternative on the World Health Organization's List of Essential Medicines.

== Medical uses ==
Eletriptan was approved by the United States Food and Drug Administration (FDA) in December 2002, for the acute treatment of migraine with or without aura in adults. It is available only by prescription in the United States, Canada, and Australia. It is not intended for the prophylactic therapy of migraine or for use in the management of hemiplegic or basilar migraine. It is available in 20 mg and 40 mg strengths.

== Contraindications ==
Eletriptan is contraindicated in patients with various diseases of the heart and circulatory system, such as angina pectoris, severe hypertension, and heart failure, as well as in patients that have had a stroke or heart attack. This is due to the unusual side effect of coronary vasoconstriction due to serotonin 5-HT_{1B} receptor agonism, which can precipitate a heart attack in those already at risk. It is also contraindicated in severe kidney (renal) or liver (hepatic) impairment due to its extensive liver metabolism through CYP3A4.

== Side effects ==
Common side effects include hypertension, tachycardia, headache, dizziness, drowsiness, and symptoms similar to angina pectoris. Severe allergic reactions have been seen rarely.

== Interactions ==
Strong inhibitors of the liver enzyme CYP3A4, such as erythromycin and ketoconazole, significantly increase blood plasma concentration of eletriptan and should be separated by at least 72 hours. Ergot alkaloids, such as dihydroergotamine, add to the drug's hypertensive effect and should be separated by at least 24 hours.

== Pharmacology ==
=== Mechanism of action ===
Eletriptan activities
Target	Affinity (K_{i}, nM)
5-HT_{1A}	1.9–45 (K_{i}); 417–1,820 (EC_{50})
5-HT_{1B}	0.52–15.1 (K_{i}); 8.1–60 (EC_{50}); 83% (E_{max})
5-HT_{1D}	0.10–1.5 (K_{i}); 0.63–0.91 (EC_{50})
5-HT_{1E}	40–62 (K_{i}); 30–126 (EC_{50})
5-HT_{1F}	5–20 (K_{i}); 7.4–132 (EC_{50})
5-HT_{2A}	1,150–>3,160 (K_{i}); 851 (EC_{50})
5-HT_{2B}	447 (K_{i}); 155 (EC_{50})
5-HT_{2C}	>3,160 (K_{i}); ND (EC_{50})
5-HT_{3}	>3,160 (mouse)
5-HT_{4}	>3,160 (guinea pig)
5-HT_{5A}	977–1,584 (rat)
5-HT_{6}	525
5-HT_{7}	200 (K_{i}); 355 (EC_{50})
α_{1A}–α_{1D}	ND
α_{2A}–α_{2C}	ND
β_{1}–β_{3}	ND
D_{1}–D_{5}	ND
H_{1}–H_{4}	ND
M_{1}–M_{5}	ND
I_{1}, I_{2}	ND
σ_{1}, σ_{2}	ND
TAAR1	ND
SERT	ND
NET	ND
DAT	ND
Notes: The smaller the value, the more avidly the drug binds to the site. All proteins are human unless otherwise specified. Refs:

Eletriptan is believed to reduce swelling of the blood vessels surrounding the brain. This swelling is associated with the head pain of a migraine attack. Eletriptan blocks the release of substances from nerve endings that cause more pain and other symptoms like nausea, and sensitivity to light and sound. It is thought that these actions contribute to relief of symptoms by eletriptan.

Eletriptan is a serotonin receptor agonist, specifically an agonist of certain 5-HT_{1} family receptors. Eletriptan binds with high affinity to the 5-HT_{[1B}_{,} _{1D}_{,} _{1F]} receptors. It has a modest affinity to the 5-HT_{[1A}_{,} _{1E}_{,} _{2B}_{,} _{7]} receptors, and little to no affinity at the 5-HT_{[2A}_{,} _{2C}_{,} _{3}_{,} _{4}_{,} _{5A}_{,} _{6]} receptors.

Eletriptan has no significant affinity or pharmacological activity at adrenergic α_{1}, α_{2}, or β; dopaminergic D_{1} or D_{2}; muscarinic; or opioid receptors. Eletriptan could be efficiently co-administered with nitric oxide synthase (NOS's) inhibitors for the treatment of NOS-dependent diseases (US patent US 2007/0254940).

Two theories have been proposed to explain the efficacy of 5-HT_{1} receptor agonists in migraine. One theory suggests that activation of 5-HT_{1} receptors located on intracranial blood vessels, including those on the arteriovenous anastomoses, leads to vasoconstriction, which is correlated with the relief of migraine headache. The other hypothesis suggests that activation of 5-HT_{1} receptors on sensory nerve endings in the trigeminal system results in the inhibition of pro-inflammatory neuropeptide release.

The drug is also notable in being a weak serotonin 5-HT_{2A} receptor agonist (EC_{50} = 851 nM), albeit with about two to three orders of magnitude lower activational potency than at the serotonin 5-HT_{1B} and 5-HT_{1D} receptors.

== Chemistry ==
Eletriptan is a tryptamine and pyrrolidinylmethylindole derivative and is a 5-substituted and cyclized tryptamine derivative of the psychedelic drug dimethyltryptamine (DMT).

The experimental log P is 3.9 and its predicted log P is 1.78 to 4.1.

=== Additional chemical names ===
- Merck Index: 3-[[(2R)-1-Methyl-2-pyrrolidinyl]methyl]-5-[2-(phenylsulfonyl)ethyl]-1H-indole
- 5-[2-(benzenesulfonyl)ethyl]-3-(1-methylpyrrolidin-2(R)-ylmethyl)-1H-indole
- (R)-5-[2-(phenylsulfonyl)ethyl]-3-[(1-methyl-2-pyrrolidinyl)methyl]-1H-indole

== History ==
Eletriptan was approved for medical use in the United States in 2002. It was covered by U.S. Patent no. 5545644 and U.S. Patent no. 6110940; both now expired.

== Society and culture ==
=== Brand names ===
Eletriptan is sold in the United States, Canada, Australia, and the United Kingdom under the brand name Relpax, and in several other countries under the brand name Relert.

In the United States, Relpax is marketed by Viatris after Upjohn was spun off from Pfizer.
