= 1-Aminotetralin =

Names
- Preferred IUPAC name 1,2,3,4-Tetrahydronaphthalen-1-amine
- Other names 1-AT; 1-Amino-1,2,3,4-tetrahydronaphthalene

Identifiers
CAS Number	2217-40-5
3D model (JSmol)	Interactive image
ChemSpider	17067
ECHA InfoCard	100.017.012
EC Number	220-973-7
PubChem CID	18066
UNII	O7A3GV2PNX
CompTox Dashboard (EPA)	DTXSID70903059
- InChI: InChI=1S/C10H13N/c11-10-7-3-5-8-4-1-2-6-9(8)10/h1-2,4,6,10H,3,5,7,11H2 Key: JRZGPXSSNPTNMA-UHFFFAOYSA-N
- SMILES: C1CC(C2=CC=CC=C2C1)N

Properties
Chemical formula	C_{10}H_{13}N
Molar mass	147.221 g·mol^{−1}
- Except where otherwise noted, data are given for materials in their standard state (at 25 °C [77 °F], 100 kPa). Infobox references

1-Aminotetralin (1-AT), also known as 1-amino-1,2,3,4-tetrahydronaphthalene, is a chemical compound and one of the possible positional isomers of aminotetralin. It consists of a tetralin core with an amino substituent on one of the carbon atoms.

== Derivatives ==
1-Aminotetralin is the parent structure of a number of drugs, including the following:

- Dasotraline
- Desmethylsertraline
- Ethonam
- Lometraline
- LP-12
- LP-44
- Sertraline
- SR 59230A
- Tametraline
- Tochergamine

Tramazoline is another related compound.

== See also ==
- 2-Aminotetralin
- Aminoindane
