= C16H18N2O2 =

The molecular formula C_{16}H_{18}N_{2}O_{2} (molar mass: 270.33 g/mol, exact mass: 270.1368 u) may refer to:

- Ciproxifan
- Domoxin
- Ethonam
- Penniclavine
- Clavicipitic acid
- Molliclavine
