= C17H19N =

The molecular formula C_{17}H_{19}N (molar mass: 237.34 g/mol, exact mass: 237.1517 u) may refer to:

- CP-39,332
- Dimefadane
- 2-Diphenylmethylpyrrolidine (Desoxy-D2PM)
- Etifelmine
- Tametraline (CP-24,441)
