= C16H15Cl2N =

The molecular formula C_{16}H_{15}Cl_{2}N (molar mass: 256.75 g/mol) may refer to:

- Dasotraline
- Desmethylsertraline (DMS), also known as norsertraline
- Indatraline
