= CP-39,332 =

Chemical compound

Clinical data
- Other names: CP-39332; CP39332
- Routes of administration: Oral
- Drug class: Serotonin–norepinephrine reuptake inhibitor (SNRI)
- ATC code: None

Legal status
- Legal status: In general: uncontrolled

Identifiers
- IUPAC name: 1,2,3,4-tetrahydro-N-methyl-4-phenyl-2-naphthalenamine
- CAS Number: 61764-60-1
- PubChem CID: 15657209
- DrugBank: DB09193
- ChemSpider: 23189744
- UNII: R0YEK8P3H4
- ChEMBL: ChEMBL104444
- CompTox Dashboard (EPA): DTXSID20576434

Chemical and physical data
- Formula: C_{17}H_{19}N
- Molar mass: 237.346 g·mol^{−1}
- 3D model (JSmol): Interactive image
- SMILES: CNC1CC(C2=CC=CC=C2C1)C3=CC=CC=C3
- InChI: InChI=1S/C17H19N/c1-18-15-11-14-9-5-6-10-16(14)17(12-15)13-7-3-2-4-8-13/h2-10,15,17-18H,11-12H2,1H3; Key:HLOCJJORRHQDKS-UHFFFAOYSA-N

CP-39,332 is a serotonin–norepinephrine reuptake inhibitor (SNRI) of the 2-aminotetralin family. Tametraline (1R,4S-), CP-24,442 (1S,4R-), CP-22,185 (cis-), and CP-22,186 (trans-) are stereoisomers of the compound and show varying effects on monoamine reuptake. None of them were ever marketed.

== See also ==
- Substituted 2-aminotetralin
- Tametraline
- Sertraline
- Indatraline
