= C10H13N =

The molecular formula C_{10}H_{13}N (molar mass 147.219 g/mol, exact mass: 147.1048 u) may refer to:

- Actinidine
- Aminotetralins
  - 1-Aminotetralin
  - 2-Aminotetralin (2-AT or THN)
- NM-2-AI, or N-methyl-2-aminoindane
- Phenylbutenamine
- 1-Aminomethylindane
