= C20H21FN2O =

The molecular formula C_{20}H_{21}FN_{2}O (molar mass: 324.39 g/mol, exact mass: 324.1638 u) may refer to:

- Citalopram
- Escitalopram
