= Dimefadane =

Analgesic

Clinical data
- Other names: SK&F 1340, SKF 1340, NIH 7661,

Identifiers
- IUPAC name: N,N-dimethyl-3-phenyl-2,3-dihydro-1H-inden-1-amine
- CAS Number: 5581-40-8
- PubChem CID: 21760
- ChemSpider: 20452
- UNII: 8P2F16YH55
- KEGG: D03831
- ChEBI: CHEBI:177652
- ChEMBL: ChEMBL1190753
- CompTox Dashboard (EPA): DTXSID60863572

Chemical and physical data
- Formula: C_{17}H_{19}N
- Molar mass: 237.346 g·mol^{−1}
- 3D model (JSmol): Interactive image
- SMILES: CN(C)C1CC(C2=CC=CC=C12)C3=CC=CC=C3
- InChI: InChI=1S/C17H19N/c1-18(2)17-12-16(13-8-4-3-5-9-13)14-10-6-7-11-15(14)17/h3-11,16-17H,12H2,1-2H3; Key:GAVBHVRHVQMWEI-UHFFFAOYSA-N

Dimefadane is an analgesic agent with about the same activity as codeine, but without any of the GI side effects. Although it does not adhere to the classical morphine rule (structure includes a tertiary amine, phenyl ring and quaternary carbon), it is not known if this is opioidergic. It has structure activity relationships that can be compared to tametraline. Klaus Bøgesø used dimefadane as the harbinger to Indatraline.

== Synthesis ==
Synthesis: Cyclic Normethadone derivative: Patents:

Dimefadane synthesis

The Friedel-Crafts reaction between cinnamic acid [140-10-3] (1) and benzene in the presence of a Lewis acid catalyst gives 3,3-diphenylpropionic acid [606-83-7] (2). The cyclization of this gives 3-phenyl-1-indanone [16618-72-7] (3). Heating with ammonium formate (Leuckart reaction) gives 3-phenyl-1-indanamine, PC22346445 (4). Although reduction of the oxime would also work, perhaps there is differences in the proficiency between the different methods. Heating with formaldehyde and formic acid (Eschweiler-Clark reaction) then produces dimefadane (5).
