= Desmethylcitalopram =

Chemical compound

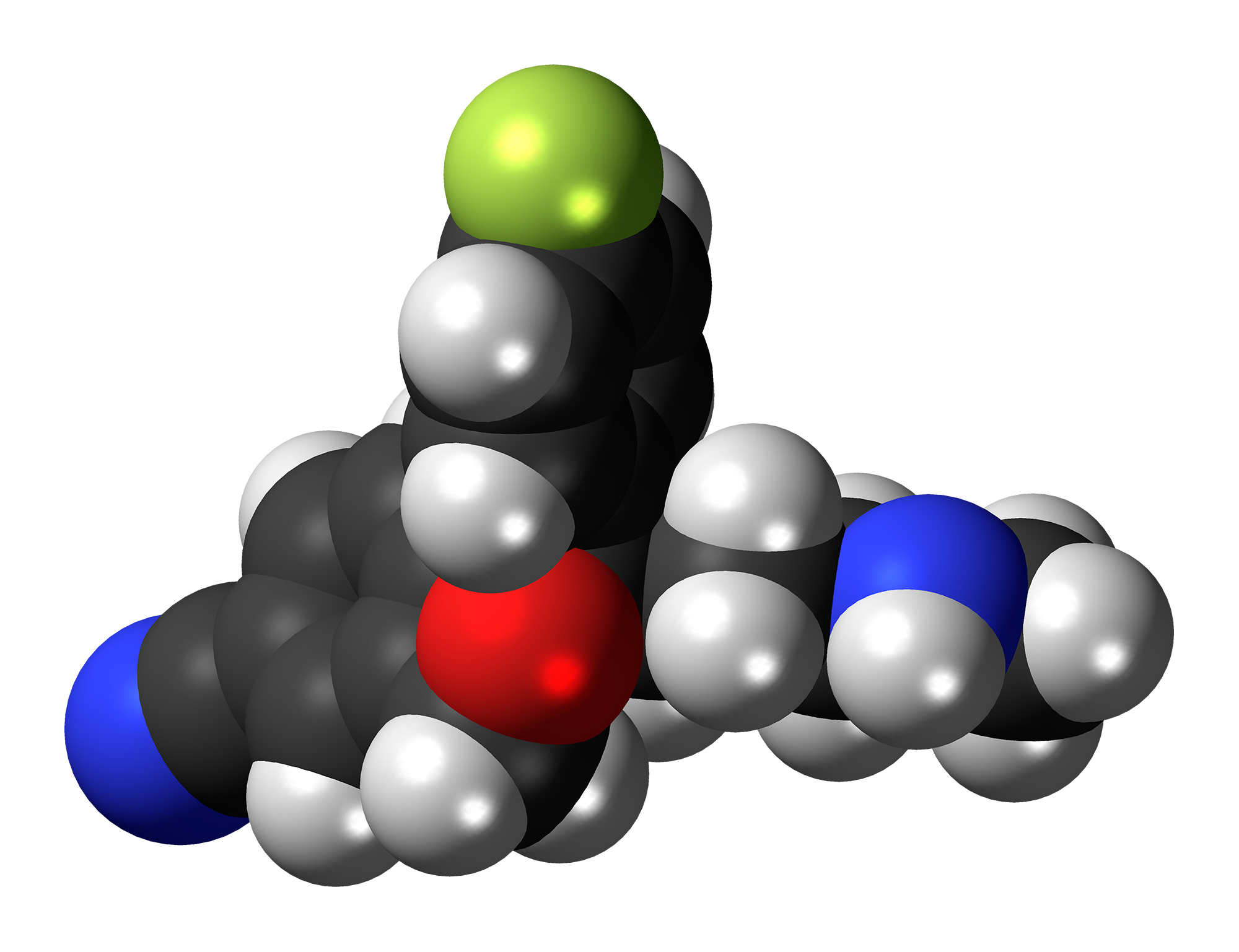

Clinical data
- ATC code: none

Legal status
- Legal status: In general: uncontrolled

Pharmacokinetic data
- Elimination half-life: 50 h

Identifiers
- IUPAC name: (RS/S)-1-[3-(Methylamino)propyl]-1-(4-fluorophenyl)-1,3-dihydroisobenzofuran-5-carbonitrile
- CAS Number: 62498-67-3
- PubChem CID: 162180
- ChemSpider: 142424
- UNII: 3KBX9104IR
- CompTox Dashboard (EPA): DTXSID90881082
- ECHA InfoCard: 100.057.776

Chemical and physical data
- Formula: C_{19}H_{19}FN_{2}O
- Molar mass: 310.372 g·mol^{−1}
- 3D model (JSmol): Interactive image
- SMILES: CNCCCC1(C2=C(CO1)C=C(C=C2)C#N)C3=CC=C(C=C3)F
- InChI: InChI=1S/C19H19FN2O/c1-22-10-2-9-19(16-4-6-17(20)7-5-16)18-8-3-14(12-21)11-15(18)13-23-19/h3-8,11,22H,2,9-10,13H2,1H3; Key:PTJADDMMFYXMMG-UHFFFAOYSA-N

Desmethylcitalopram is an active metabolite of the antidepressant drugs citalopram (racemic) and escitalopram (the S-enantiomer, which would be called desmethylescitalopram). Like citalopram and escitalopram, desmethylcitalopram functions as a selective serotonin reuptake inhibitor (SSRI), and is responsible for some of its parent’s therapeutic benefits.

== See also ==
- Desmethylsertraline
- Desmethylvenlafaxine
- Didesmethylcitalopram
- Norfluoxetine
