= Didesmethylcitalopram =

Chemical compound

Clinical data
- ATC code: none

Legal status
- Legal status: In general: uncontrolled

Pharmacokinetic data
- Elimination half-life: 100 h

Identifiers
- IUPAC name: (RS or S)-1-[3-aminopropyl]-1- (4-fluorophenyl)-1,3-dihydroisobenzofuran-5-carbonitrile
- CAS Number: 62498-69-5
- ChemSpider: 23935928
- UNII: ZE9YVI4ZEE
- CompTox Dashboard (EPA): DTXSID30168066

Chemical and physical data
- Formula: C_{18}H_{17}FN_{2}O
- Molar mass: 296.345 g·mol^{−1}
- 3D model (JSmol): Interactive image
- SMILES: c1cc(ccc1[C@]2(c3ccc(cc3CO2)C#N)CCCN)F
- InChI: InChI=1S/C18H17FN2O/c19-16-5-3-15(4-6-16)18(8-1-9-20)17-7-2-13(11-21)10-14(17)12-22-18/h2-7,10H,1,8-9,12,20H2/t18-/m0/s1; Key:RKUKMUWCRLRPEJ-SFHVURJKSA-N

Didesmethylcitalopram is an active metabolite of the antidepressant drug citalopram (racemic). Didesmethylescitalopram is an active metabolite of the antidepressant escitalopram, the S-enantiomer of citalopram. Like citalopram and escitalopram, didesmethyl(es)citalopram functions as a selective serotonin reuptake inhibitor (SSRI), and is responsible for some of its parents' therapeutic benefits.

== See also ==
- Desmethylcitalopram
- Desmethylsertraline
- Desmethylvenlafaxine
- Norfluoxetine
