= Allosteric serotonin reuptake inhibitor =

Allosteric serotonin reuptake inhibitor is a type of selective serotonin reuptake inhibitor (SSRI).

== Escitalopram ==
Evidence of the allosteric action of escitalopram on the serotonin transported is based on the observation that the R isomer of citalopram can decrease the potency and inhibit the effects of the S isomer, probably through an allosteric interaction between two distinct, non-overlapping binding sites for the two different isomers on the serotonin transporter. Escitalopram, thus, binds not only to the primary site, but also to the allosteric site. From known SSRIs also paroxetine has action to the allosteric site, about half potency of escitalopram.

== Vilazodone ==
Vilazodone has been shown to slow the disassociation rate of imipramine at the orthosteric of SERT by binding to a non-orthosteric pocket on the transporter.
