= Molliclavine =

Names
- IUPAC name (6aR,10aR)-9-(hydroxymethyl)-7-methyl-6,6a,8,10a-tetrahydro-4H-indolo[4,3-fg]quinolin-10-ol
- Other names Molliclavine-I; 8,9-Didehydro-9-hydroxy-6-methylergoline-8-methanol

Identifiers
CAS Number	6858-92-0
3D model (JSmol)	Interactive image
ChemSpider	58828639
PubChem CID	142572316
- InChI: InChI=1S/C16H18N2O2/c1-18-7-10(8-19)16(20)15-11-3-2-4-12-14(11)9(6-17-12)5-13(15)18/h2-4,6,13,15,17,19-20H,5,7-8H2,1H3/t13-,15-/m1/s1 Key: VKTQBNRQJYBKMU-UKRRQHHQSA-N
- SMILES: CN1CC(=C([C@H]2[C@H]1CC3=CNC4=CC=CC2=C34)O)CO

Properties
Chemical formula	C_{16}H_{18}N_{2}O_{2}
Molar mass	270.332 g·mol^{−1}
- Except where otherwise noted, data are given for materials in their standard state (at 25 °C [77 °F], 100 kPa). Infobox references

Molliclavine is a clavine and ergot alkaloid found in Claviceps on Leymus mollis. It has also been detected in morning glory species such as Argyreia nervosa (Hawaiian baby woodrose) and Ipomoea muelleri. The compound was first described in the scientific literature by 1955.

== See also ==
- Substituted ergoline
