= Dasotraline =

Chemical compound

Pharmacokinetic data
- Elimination half-life: 47-77 hours

Identifiers
- IUPAC name: (1R,4S)-4-(3,4-Dichlorophenyl)-1,2,3,4-tetrahydro-1-naphthalenamine
- CAS Number: 675126-05-3
- PubChem CID: 9947999
- DrugBank: DB12305
- ChemSpider: 8123611
- UNII: 4D28EY0L5T
- KEGG: D10700
- ChEMBL: ChEMBL3301595
- CompTox Dashboard (EPA): DTXSID20217855

Chemical and physical data
- Formula: C_{16}H_{15}Cl_{2}N
- Molar mass: 292.20 g·mol^{−1}
- 3D model (JSmol): Interactive image
- SMILES: C1C[C@H](C2=CC=CC=C2[C@@H]1C3=CC(=C(C=C3)Cl)Cl)N
- InChI: InChI=1S/C16H15Cl2N/c17-14-7-5-10(9-15(14)18)11-6-8-16(19)13-4-2-1-3-12(11)13/h1-5,7,9,11,16H,6,8,19H2/t11-,16+/m0/s1; Key:SRPXSILJHWNFMK-MEDUHNTESA-N

Dasotraline (INN; former developmental code name SEP-225,289) is a serotonin-norepinephrine-dopamine reuptake inhibitor (SNDRI) that was under development by Sunovion for the treatment of attention-deficit hyperactivity disorder (ADHD) and binge eating disorder (BED). Structurally, dasotraline is a stereoisomer of desmethylsertraline (DMS), which is an active metabolite of the marketed selective serotonin reuptake inhibitor (SSRI) antidepressant sertraline (Zoloft).

== Adverse Effects ==
In phase I clinical trials for attention deficit hyperactivity disorder, test subjects reported the following side effects:

- Loss of appetite
- Dehydration
- Dry mouth
- Nausea
- Insomnia
- Anxiety
- Panic attacks
- Headaches

== History ==
In 2017, the U.S. Food and Drug Administration accepted Sunovion's New Drug Application (NDA) for review for the treatment of ADHD; however, the NDA was ultimately rejected citing the need for additional studies to determine efficacy and tolerability. In July 2019, Sunovion’s NDA for the treatment of BED was accepted with an expected action date of May 2020. In May 2020, Sunovion halted its drug development program for dasotraline, withdrawing both NDAs for ADHD and BED.

== Law ==
=== Finland ===
Dasotraline is completely unscheduled.

== See also ==
- Centanafadine
- Indatraline
- Lometraline
- Tametraline
