= Desmethylsertraline =

Chemical compound

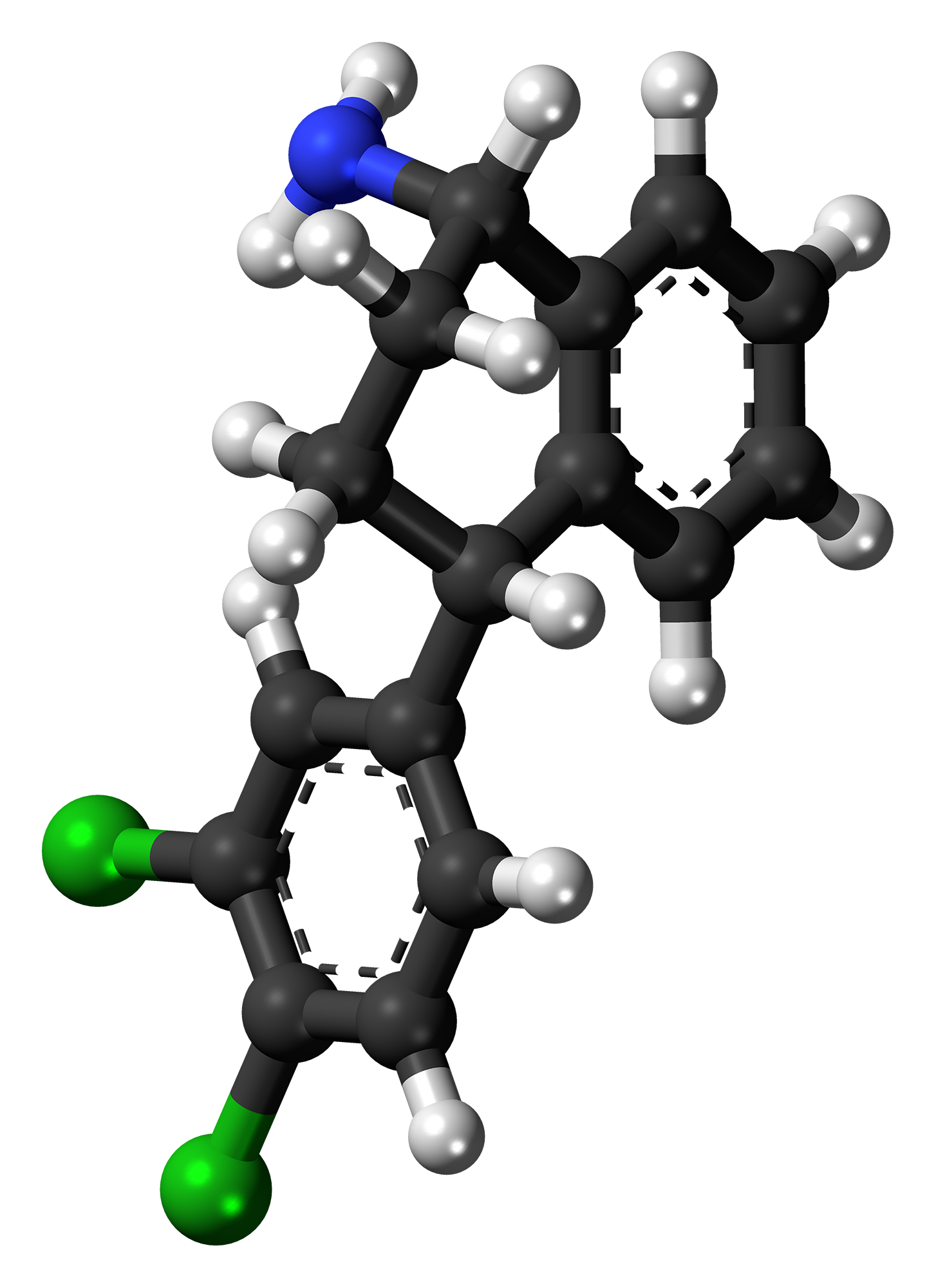

Clinical data
- ATC code: none

Legal status
- Legal status: In general: uncontrolled

Pharmacokinetic data
- Elimination half-life: 66 hours
- Excretion: urine

Identifiers
- IUPAC name: (1S,4S)-4-(3,4-dichlorophenyl)-1,2,3,4-tetrahydronaphthalen-1-amine
- CAS Number: 87857-41-8
- PubChem CID: 114743
- DrugBank: DB14071
- ChemSpider: 102729
- UNII: CJJ71O9BE8
- ChEMBL: ChEMBL40733
- CompTox Dashboard (EPA): DTXSID60236666

Chemical and physical data
- Formula: C_{16}H_{15}Cl_{2}N
- Molar mass: 292.20 g·mol^{−1}
- 3D model (JSmol): Interactive image
- SMILES: Clc1ccc(cc1Cl)[C@H]3c2c(cccc2)[C@@H](N)CC3

Desmethylsertraline (DMS), also known as norsertraline, is an active metabolite of the antidepressant drug sertraline. Like sertraline, desmethylsertraline acts as a monoamine reuptake inhibitor, and may be responsible for some of its parent's therapeutic benefits; however, the effects of DMS's main activity of increasing serotonin levels via binding to the serotonin transporter appears to be negligible as in vivo testing showed no measurable change in brain activity despite a nearly 20-fold increase in DMS blood levels compared to the EC50 (i.e. the amount required to achieve the desired effect in 50% of the population) of its parent drug sertraline. DMS is significantly less potent relative to sertraline as a serotonin reuptake inhibitor (K_{i} = 76 nM vs. 3 nM, respectively), but conversely, is more balanced as a monoamine reuptake inhibitor (5-HT (K_{i}) = 76 nM; NE (K_{i}) = 420 nM; DA (K_{i}) = 440 nM), which has the effective result of DMS contrarily behaving as a serotonin-norepinephrine-dopamine reuptake inhibitor (SNDRI), with about 5.5-fold preference for inhibiting serotonin reuptake relative to catecholamine reuptake.

Dasotraline, a stereoisomer of DMS, is also an SNDRI, and has been investigated for the potential clinical treatment of major depressive disorder, attention deficit hyperactivity disorder, and eating disorders, but has not been approved or marketed for any indication.

== See also ==
- Desmethylcitalopram
- Desmethylvenlafaxine
- Didesmethylcitalopram
- Indatraline
- Lometraline
- Norfluoxetine
- Tametraline
