= Escitalopram =

SSRI antidepressant

- Skeletal structure of escitalopram

- Ball-and-stick model of escitalopram

Clinical data
- Pronunciation: /ˌɛsəˈtæləˌpræm/ eh-sə-TA-lə-pram
- Trade names: Cipralex, Lexapro, others
- Other names: (S)-citalopram; S-citalopram; S-(+)-citalopram; S(+)-citalopram; (+)-citalopram; LU-26054; MLD-55
- AHFS/Drugs.com: Monograph
- MedlinePlus: a603005
- License data: US DailyMed: Escitalopram
- Pregnancy category: AU: C
- Routes of administration: By mouth
- Drug class: Selective serotonin reuptake inhibitor (SSRI)
- ATC code: N06AB10 (WHO)

Legal status
- Legal status: AU: S4 (Prescription only); BR: Class C1 (Other controlled substances); CA: ℞-only; UK: POM (Prescription only); US: ℞-only; EU: Rx-only; In general: ℞ (Prescription only)

Pharmacokinetic data
- Bioavailability: ~80%
- Protein binding: ~55–56% (low)
- Metabolism: Liver (CYP2C19, CYP3A4, CYP2D6)
- Metabolites: • Desmethylcitalopram • Didesmethylcitalopram
- Elimination half-life: ~27–32 hours
- Excretion: Urine (major; 8–10% unchanged), feces (minor)

Identifiers
- IUPAC name: (S)-1-[3-(dimethylamino)propyl]-1-(4-fluorophenyl)-1,3-dihydroisobenzofuran-5-carbonitrile
- CAS Number: 128196-01-0
- PubChem CID: 146570
- DrugBank: DB01175
- ChemSpider: 129277
- UNII: 4O4S742ANY
- KEGG: D07913
- ChEBI: CHEBI:36791
- ChEMBL: ChEMBL1508
- CompTox Dashboard (EPA): DTXSID8048440
- ECHA InfoCard: 100.244.188

Chemical and physical data
- Formula: C_{20}H_{21}FN_{2}O
- Molar mass: 324.399 g·mol^{−1}
- 3D model (JSmol): Interactive image
- Chirality: Levorotatory enantiomer
- SMILES: Fc1ccc(cc1)[C@@]3(OCc2cc(C#N)ccc23)CCCN(C)C
- InChI: InChI=1S/C20H21FN2O/c1-23(2)11-3-10-20(17-5-7-18(21)8-6-17)19-9-4-15(13-22)12-16(19)14-24-20/h4-9,12H,3,10-11,14H2,1-2H3/t20-/m0/s1; Key:WSEQXVZVJXJVFP-FQEVSTJZSA-N

Escitalopram, sold under the brand names Lexapro and Cipralex, among others, is an antidepressant medication of the selective serotonin reuptake inhibitor (SSRI) class. It is mainly used to treat major depressive disorder, generalized anxiety disorder, panic disorder, obsessive–compulsive disorder (OCD), and social anxiety disorder. Escitalopram is taken by mouth. For commercial use, it is formulated as an oxalate salt exclusively.

Common side effects include headache, nausea, sexual problems, mild sedation, and trouble sleeping. In some patients, sexual dysfunction may persist even after the drug is discontinued, a condition known as post-SSRI sexual dysfunction; regulatory agencies including the European Medicines Agency and Health Canada have recommended that escitalopram's product labeling warn of this risk. More serious side effects may include suicidal thoughts in people up to the age of 24 years.

Escitalopram was approved for medical use in the United States in 2002. Escitalopram is rarely replaced by twice the dose of citalopram; escitalopram is safer and more effective. It is on the World Health Organization's List of Essential Medicines. In 2024, it was the thirteenth most commonly prescribed medication in the United States, with more than 41 million prescriptions. In Australia, it was one of the top ten most prescribed medications between 2017 and 2023.

== Medical uses ==
Escitalopram is approved by the US Food and Drug Administration (FDA) for the treatment of major depressive disorder in adolescents and adults, and generalized anxiety disorder (GAD) in adults, in dosage from 5 to 20 mg. In European countries including the United Kingdom, it is approved for depression and anxiety disorders; these include: generalized anxiety disorder, social anxiety disorder (SAD), obsessive–compulsive disorder (OCD), and panic disorder with or without agoraphobia. In Australia it is approved for major depressive disorder.

=== Depression ===
Escitalopram is among the most effective and well-tolerated antidepressants for the short-term treatment of major depressive disorder in adults. It also seems to be the safest one to give to children and adolescents.

Controversy existed regarding the effectiveness of escitalopram compared with its predecessor, citalopram. The importance of this issue followed from the greater cost of escitalopram relative to the generic mixture of isomers of citalopram, prior to the expiration of the escitalopram patent in 2012, which led to charges of evergreening. Accordingly, this issue has been examined in at least 10 different systematic reviews and meta analyses. As of 2012, reviews had concluded (with caveats in some cases) that escitalopram is modestly superior to citalopram in efficacy and tolerability.

=== Anxiety disorders ===
Escitalopram appears to be effective in treating generalized anxiety disorder, with relapse on escitalopram at 20% rather than placebo at 50%, which translates to a number needed to treat of 3.33. Escitalopram appears effective in treating social anxiety disorder as well.

=== Other ===
Escitalopram may reduce premenstrual symptoms in women with premenstrual syndrome and premenstrual dysphoric disorder. It seems to be more effective when taken continuously compared to luteal phase administration. It is also occasionally prescribed off-label for insomnia secondary to a mental disorder, and vasomotor symptoms (hot flashes) associated with menopause.

== Side effects ==
Escitalopram has a relatively favorable side effect profile compared to other antidepressant medications. Some of the most common side effects in order of frequency are, headache, nausea, somnolence, insomnia, dry mouth, fatigue, decreased libido, constipation, and flu-like symptoms.

Similar to other SSRIs, escitalopram has been shown to affect sexual function, causing delayed ejaculation, and anorgasmia.

There is also evidence that SSRIs are correlated with an increase in suicidal ideation in certain individuals. An analysis conducted by the FDA found a statistically insignificant 1.5 to 2.4-fold (depending on the statistical technique used) increase of suicidality among the adults treated with escitalopram for psychiatric indications. The authors of a related study note the general problem with statistical approaches: due to the rarity of suicidal events in clinical trials, it is hard to draw firm conclusions with a sample smaller than two million patients.

Citalopram and escitalopram are associated with a mild dose-dependent QT interval prolongation, which is a measure of how rapidly the heart muscle repolarizes after each heartbeat. Prolongation of the QT interval is a risk factor for torsades de pointes (TdP), a heart rhythm disturbance that is sometimes fatal.

Despite the observed change in the QT interval, the risk of TdP from escitalopram appears to be quite low, and it is similar to other antidepressants that are not known to affect the QT interval. A 2013 review discusses several reasons to be optimistic about the safety of escitalopram. It references a crossover study in which 113 subjects were each given four different treatments in randomized order: placebo, 10 mg/day escitalopram, 30 mg/day escitalopram, or 400 mg/day moxifloxacin (a positive control known to cause QTc prolongation). At 10 mg/day, escitalopram increased the QTc interval by 4.5 milliseconds (ms). At 30 mg/day, the QTc increased by 10.7 ms. A QTc increase of less than 60 ms is not likely to confer significant risk. The 30 mg/day escitalopram dose induced significantly less QTc prolongation than a therapeutically equivalent 60 mg/day dose of citalopram, which increased the QTc interval by 18.5 ms.

More data about the cardiac risk from escitalopram can be found in a large observational study from Sweden that took note of all the medications used by all the patients presenting with TdP, and found the incidence of TdP in escitalopram users to be only 0.7 cases of TdP for every 100,000 patients who took the drug (ages 18–64), and only 4.1 cases of TdP for every 100,000 elderly patients who took the drug (ages 65 and up). Of the 9 antidepressants that were used by patients with TdP, escitalopram ranked 7th by TdP incidence in elderly patients (only venlafaxine and amitriptyline had less risk), and it ranked 5th of 9 by TdP incidence in patients ages 18–64.

Antidepressants as a class had a relatively low risk of TdP, and most patients on an antidepressant who experienced TdP were also taking another drug that prolonged QT interval. Specifically, 80% of the escitalopram users who experienced TdP were taking at least one other drug known to cause TdP. For comparison, the most popular antiarrhythmic drug in the study was sotalol with 52,750 users, and sotalol had a TdP incidence of 81.1 cases and 41.2 cases of TdP per 100,000 users in the ≥65 and 18-to-64-year-old demographics, respectively.

Drugs that prolong the QT interval, such as escitalopram, should be used with caution in those with congenital long QT syndrome or known pre-existing QT interval prolongation, or in combination with other medicines that prolong the QT interval. ECG measurements should be considered for patients with cardiac disease, and electrolyte disturbances should be corrected before starting treatment. In December 2011, the UK implemented new restrictions on the maximum daily doses at 20 mg for adults and 10 mg for those older than 65 years or with liver impairment. The US Food and Drug Administration and Health Canada did not similarly order restrictions on escitalopram dosage, only on its predecessor citalopram.

Like other SSRIs, escitalopram has also been reported to cause hyponatremia (low sodium levels), with rates ranging from 0.5 to 32%, which can often be attributed to SIADH. This is typically not dose-dependent and at higher risk for occurrence within the first few weeks of starting treatment.

Like other SSRIs, escitalopram often exacerbates symptoms of mania and hypomania in individuals misdiagnosed with a depressive disorder instead of a bipolar disorder, making it crucial for clinicians to rule out bipolar disorders before prescribing escitalopram.

=== Very common effects ===
Very common effects (>10% incidence) include:

- Headache (24%)
- Nausea (18%)
- Ejaculation disorders (9–14%)
- Somnolence (4–13%)
- Insomnia (7–12%)

=== Common (1–10% incidence) ===
Common effects (1–10% incidence) include:

- Abnormal dreams
- Anisocoria
- Anorgasmia
- Anxiety
- Arthralgia (joint pain)
- Constipation
- Decreased or increased appetite
- Diarrhea
- Dilated pupils
- Dizziness
- Dry mouth
- Excessive sweating
- Fatigue
- Fever
- Impotence (erectile dysfunction)
- Libido changes
- Myalgia (muscular aches and pains)
- Paraesthesia (abnormal skin sensation)
- Restlessness
- Sinusitis (nasal congestion)
- Tremor
- Vomiting
- Yawning

=== Psychomotor effects ===
The most common effect is fatigue or somnolence, particularly in older adults, although patients with pre-existing daytime sleepiness and fatigue may experience paradoxical improvement of these symptoms.

Escitalopram has not been shown to affect serial reaction time, logical reasoning, serial subtraction, multitasking, or Mackworth Clock task performance.

=== Post-SSRI sexual dysfunction ===
Post-SSRI sexual dysfunction (PSSD) is an iatrogenic condition in which sexual side effects persist after discontinuation of serotonin reuptake inhibiting antidepressants, including escitalopram. Characteristic symptoms include genital numbness, pleasureless or weak orgasm, loss of libido, and erectile dysfunction; non-sexual symptoms such as emotional blunting and cognitive impairment may also occur. The condition can arise after even brief exposure to a serotonin reuptake inhibitor and may persist indefinitely; there is currently no established treatment. The DSM-5 noted in 2013 that serotonin reuptake inhibitor-induced sexual dysfunction may persist after the agent is discontinued.

A 2023 retrospective cohort study of over 12,000 males estimated the risk of irreversible sexual dysfunction at approximately 0.46% of patients treated with serotonergic antidepressants, including SSRIs, though the actual prevalence remains uncertain and the condition is likely underreported. A 2023 systematic review found that escitalopram was the single most frequently reported SSRI in PSSD case reports, followed by citalopram, paroxetine, sertraline, and fluoxetine.

In 2019, the European Medicines Agency's Pharmacovigilance Risk Assessment Committee (PRAC) recommended that product labels for all SSRIs and SNRIs, including escitalopram, be updated to state that sexual dysfunction may be long-lasting even after treatment is stopped. Health Canada followed with similar label updates in 2021. In 2024, Australia's Therapeutic Goods Administration aligned all SSRI and SNRI product information to reflect this risk.

=== Pregnancy ===
Antidepressant exposure (including escitalopram) is associated with shorter duration of pregnancy (by three days), increased risk of preterm delivery (by 55%), lower birth weight (by 75 g), and lower Apgar scores (by <0.4 points). Antidepressant exposure is not associated with an increased risk of spontaneous abortion. There is a tentative association of SSRI use during pregnancy with heart problems in the baby. The advantages of their use during pregnancy may thus not outweigh the possible negative effects on the baby.

=== Withdrawal ===
Escitalopram discontinuation, particularly abruptly, may cause certain withdrawal symptoms such as "electric shock" sensations, colloquially called "brain shivers" or "brain zaps" by those affected. Frequent symptoms in one study were dizziness (44%), muscle tension (44%), chills (44%), confusion or trouble concentrating (40%), amnesia (28%), and crying (28%). Very slow tapering is recommended.

There have been spontaneous reports of discontinuation of escitalopram and other SSRIs and SNRIs, especially when abrupt, leading to dysphoric mood, irritability, agitation, anxiety, headache, lethargy, emotional lability, insomnia, and hypomania. Other symptoms such as panic attacks, hostility, aggression, impulsivity, akathisia (psychomotor restlessness), mania, worsening of depression, and suicidal ideation can emerge when the dose is adjusted down.

== Overdose ==
Excessive doses of escitalopram usually cause relatively minor untoward effects, such as agitation and tachycardia. However, dyskinesia, hypertonia, and clonus may occur in some cases. Severe side effects of escitalopram overdose include seizures (which may be delayed), cardiovascular toxicity including QRS/QTc prolongation which can lead to arrhythmias (Torsades de pointes, ventricular fibrillation, and ventricular tachycardia), hypertension, and serotonin syndrome. Treatment of escitalopram overdoses typically involves supportive care, such as giving activated charcoal or giving benzodiazepines for seizures. Because of the risk of arrhythmias (which may be delayed) prolonged cardiac monitoring is strongly recommended.

== Interactions ==
Escitalopram weakly inhibits CYP2D6, and hence may increase plasma levels of some CYP2D6 substrates such as aripiprazole, risperidone, tramadol, or codeine. As escitalopram is only a weak inhibitor of CYP2D6, analgesia from tramadol may not be affected. Escitalopram (at the maximum dose of 20 mg/day) has been found to increase peak levels of the CYP2D6 substrate desipramine by 40% and total exposure by 100%. Likewise, it has been found to increase peak levels of the CYP2D6 substrate metoprolol by 50% and overall exposure by 82%. Escitalopram does not inhibit CYP3A4, CYP1A2, CYP2C9, CYP2C19, or CYP2E1.

Exposure to escitalopram is increased moderately, by about 50%, when it is taken with omeprazole, a CYP2C19 inhibitor. The authors of this study suggested that this increase is unlikely to be of clinical concern. Combination of citalopram with fluoxetine or fluvoxamine resulted in increased exposure to the escitalopram enantiomer, owing to the strong inhibition of CYP2C19 and CYP2D6 by these agents.

Bupropion, a known strong CYP2D6 inhibitor, has been found to significantly increase citalopram plasma concentration and systemic exposure (peak levels increased by 30%, total exposure increased by 40%); as of April 2018 the interaction with escitalopram had not been studied, but some monographs warned of the potential interaction. Citalopram did not affect the pharmacokinetics of bupropion or its metabolites in the study.

Escitalopram should be taken with caution when using St. John's wort, ginseng, dextromethorphan, linezolid, tramadol, and other serotonergic drugs due to the risk of serotonin syndrome. As an SSRI, escitalopram should not be given concurrently with MAOIs.

Escitalopram, similarly to other SSRIs, may increase bleeding risk with NSAIDs (e.g., ibuprofen, naproxen, mefenamic acid), antiplatelet drugs, anticoagulants, omega-3 fatty acids, vitamin E, and garlic supplements due to escitalopram's inhibitory effects on platelet aggregation via blocking serotonin transporters on platelets.

Escitalopram can also prolong the QT interval, and hence it is not recommended in patients who are concurrently on other medications that also can prolong the QT interval. These drugs include antiarrhythmics, antipsychotics, tricyclic antidepressants, some antihistamines (e.g., astemizole, mizolastine), macrolide and fluoroquinolone antibiotics, some 5-HT_{3} receptor antagonists (except palonosetron), and some antiretrovirals (e.g., ritonavir, saquinavir, lopinavir).

== Pharmacology ==
=== Mechanism of action ===
Binding profile
Site	K_{i} (nM)
SERT	0.8–1.1
NET	7,800
DAT	27,400
5-HT_{1A}	>1,000
5-HT_{2A}	>1,000
5-HT_{2C}	2,500
α_{1}	3,900
α_{2}	>1,000
D_{2}	>1,000
H_{1}	2,000
mACh	1,240
hERG	2,600 (IC_{50})

Escitalopram increases intrasynaptic levels of the neurotransmitter serotonin by blocking the reuptake of the neurotransmitter into the presynaptic neuron. Over time, this leads to a downregulation of pre-synaptic 5-HT_{1A} receptors, which is associated with an improvement in passive stress tolerance, and delayed downstream increase in expression of brain-derived neurotrophic factor, which may contribute to a reduction in negative affective biases.

Of the SSRIs currently available, escitalopram has the highest selectivity for the serotonin transporter (SERT) compared to the norepinephrine transporter (NET), making the side-effect profile relatively mild in comparison to less-selective SSRIs. In addition to its antagonist action at the orthosteric site of SERT, escitalopram also binds to an allosteric site on the transporter, thereby decreasing its disassociation rate. Escitalopram binds to this allosteric site at a greater affinity than other SSRIs. The clinical relevance of this action is unknown.

=== Pharmacokinetics ===
Escitalopram is a substrate of P-glycoprotein and hence P-glycoprotein inhibitors such as verapamil and quinidine may improve its blood-brain barrier penetrability. In a preclinical study in rats combining escitalopram with a P-glycoprotein inhibitor, its antidepressant-like effects were enhanced.

== Chemistry ==
Escitalopram is the (S)-enantiomer (left-handed version) of the racemate citalopram, which is responsible for its name: escitalopram.

== History ==
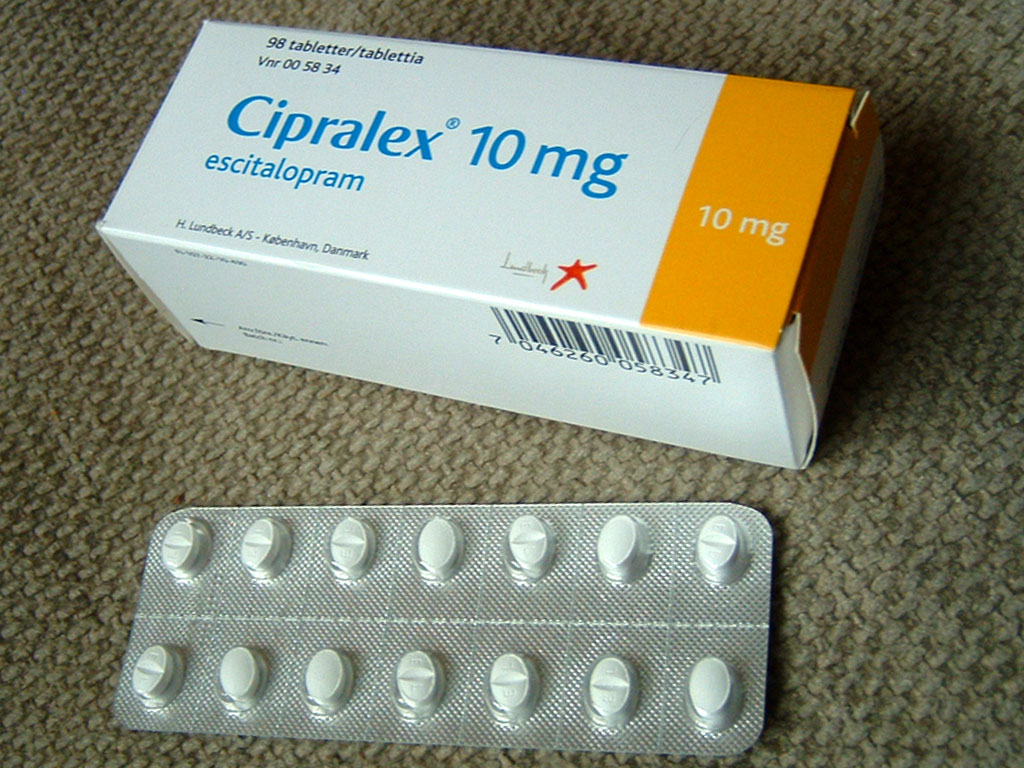
Cipralex brand escitalopram 10 mg package and tablet sheet. It is a reference escitalopram formulation, and was produced by Lundbeck.

Escitalopram was developed in cooperation between Lundbeck and Forest Laboratories. Its development was initiated in 1997, and the resulting new drug application was submitted to the US FDA in March 2001. The short time (3.5 years) it took to develop escitalopram can be attributed to the previous experience of Lundbeck and Forest with citalopram, which has similar pharmacology.

== Society and culture ==
=== Brand names ===
Escitalopram is sold under many brand names worldwide such as Cipralex, Lexapro, Lexam, Mozarin, Aciprex, Depralin, Ecytara, Elicea, Gatosil, Nexpram, Nexito, Nescital, Szetalo, Stalopam, Pramatis, Betesda, Scippa and Rexipra.

=== Legal status ===
The FDA issued the approval of escitalopram for major depression in August 2002, and for generalized anxiety disorder in December 2003. In May 2006, the FDA approved a generic version of escitalopram by Teva. In July 2006, the U.S. District Court of Delaware decided in favor of Lundbeck regarding a patent infringement dispute and ruled the patent on escitalopram valid.

In 2006, Forest Laboratories was granted an 828-day (2 years and 3 months) extension on its US patent for escitalopram. This pushed the patent expiration date from 7 December 2009, to 14 September 2011. Together with the 6-month pediatric exclusivity, the final expiration date was 14 March 2012.

=== Allegations of illegal marketing ===
In 2004, separate civil suits alleging illegal marketing of citalopram and escitalopram for use by children and teenagers by Forest were initiated by two whistleblowers: a physician named Joseph Piacentile and a Forest salesman named Christopher Gobble. In February 2009, the suits were joined. Eleven states and the District of Columbia filed notices of intent to intervene as plaintiffs in the action.

The suits alleged that Forest illegally engaged in off-label promotion of Lexapro for use in children; hid the results of a study showing lack of effectiveness in children; paid kickbacks to physicians to induce them to prescribe Lexapro to children; and conducted so-called "seeding studies" that were, in reality, marketing efforts to promote the drug's use by doctors. Forest denied the allegations but ultimately agreed to settle with the plaintiffs for over $313 million.

== See also ==
- List of antidepressants
