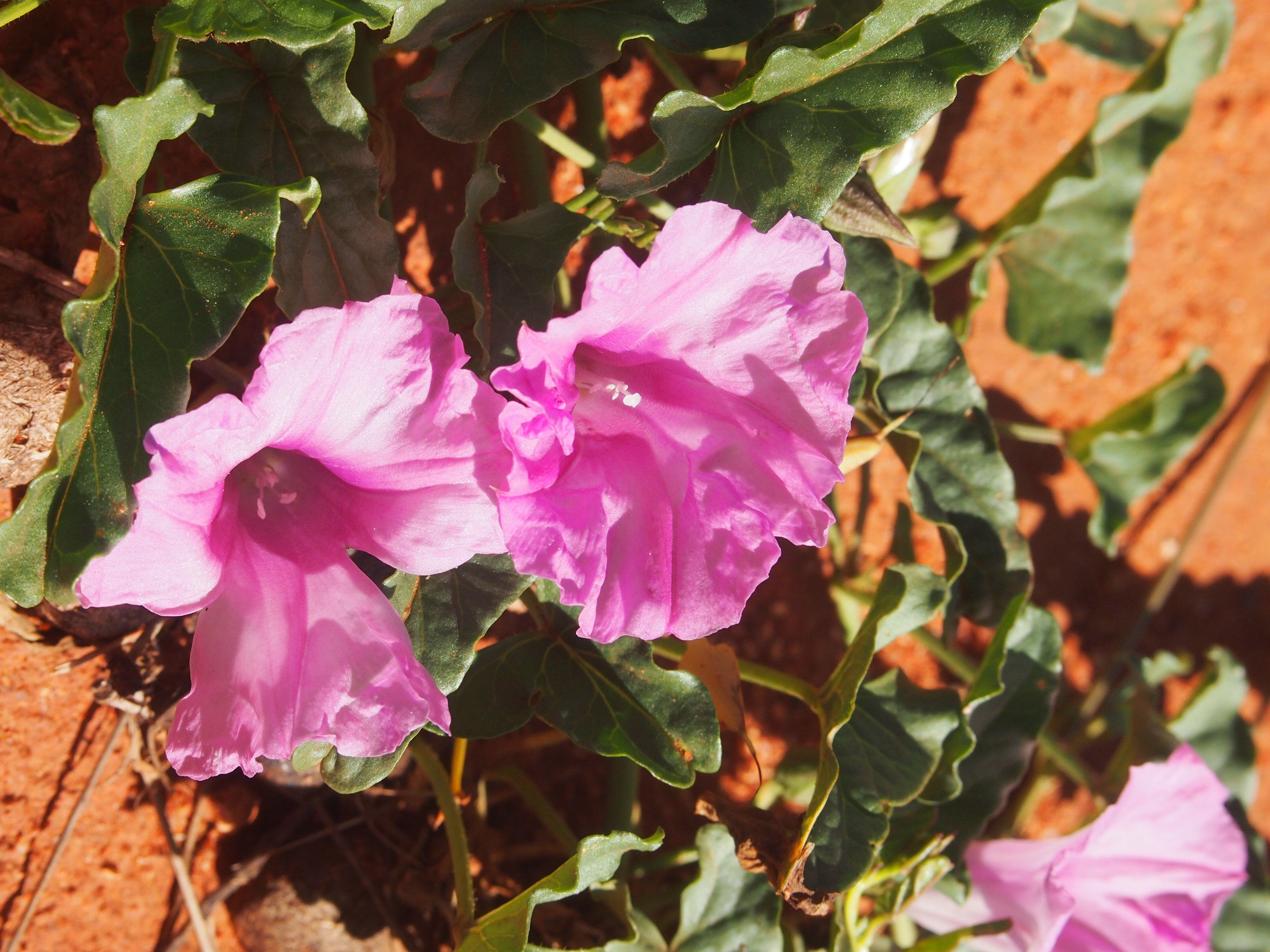

Conservation status
- Least Concern (TPWCA)

Scientific classification
- Kingdom: Plantae
- Clade: Tracheophytes
- Clade: Angiosperms
- Clade: Eudicots
- Clade: Asterids
- Order: Solanales
- Family: Convolvulaceae
- Genus: Ipomoea
- Species: I. muelleri

Binomial name
- Ipomoea muelleri Benth.

= Ipomoea muelleri =

Plant species

Ipomoea muelleri is a vine in the Convolvulaceae family. It is native to the Northern Territory, Queensland, South Australia, and Western Australia.

It was first described in 1868 by George Bentham, and the specific epithet, muelleri, honours Ferdinand von Mueller.

== Habitat ==
It is found in open forest and at the edges of monsoon forests and vine thickets.

== Aboriginal names & uses ==
The Alyawarr speaking people call it anaytapaytap, twatywert; the Anmatyerr: atywert-atywert; the Kaytetye: atywert-atywerte, kalamp-atywert-atywerte; the Warlpiri: karlampi-jurtujurtu, ngarlangkartapi, yutajiti.

The Warumungu people of the Barkly call it Karlampijurrujurru and dig out the young tubers (yams) to roast on hot ashes.
