= Clavicipitic acid =

Identifiers
| 3D model (JSmol) | Interactive image |
| ChEBI | CHEBI:23325 |
| ChemSpider | 8440634 |
| PubChem CID | 10265155 |
- InChI: InChI=1S/C16H18N2O2/c1-9(2)6-13-11-4-3-5-12-15(11)10(8-17-12)7-14(18-13)16(19)20/h3-6,8,13-14,17-18H,7H2,1-2H3,(H,19,20) Key: VZMAHZAQMKNJIG-UHFFFAOYSA-N
- SMILES: CC(=CC1C2=C3C(=CNC3=CC=C2)CC(N1)C(=O)O)C

Properties
| Chemical formula | C_{16}H_{18}N_{2}O_{2} |
| Molar mass | 270.332 g·mol^{−1} |
- Except where otherwise noted, data are given for materials in their standard state (at 25 °C [77 °F], 100 kPa). Infobox references

Clavicipitic acid is an ergoline-related compound found in ergot; it is a tricyclic indole alkaloid, but is in fact an amino acid that can be described as a specific structural analogue of lysergamide (ergine).

Clavicipitic acid, a metabolite of Claviceps, is a mixture of isomers formed from tryptophan and mevalonic acid, but does not subsequently convert into the tetracyclic elymoclavine. Its formation represents a deviation in the biosynthesis of ergoline-based compounds following the first stage specific to this pathway, namely the isoprenylation of tryptophan.
