= Ethonam =

Chemical compound

Identifiers
- IUPAC name: Ethyl 3-(1,2,3,4-tetrahydronaphthalen-1-yl)imidazole-4-carboxylate
- CAS Number: 15037-44-2
- PubChem CID: 27007
- ChemSpider: 49010
- UNII: G84P716Z93
- KEGG: D04085
- ChEMBL: ChEMBL25148
- CompTox Dashboard (EPA): DTXSID30864551

Chemical and physical data
- Formula: C_{16}H_{18}N_{2}O_{2}
- Molar mass: 270.332 g·mol^{−1}

Ethonam is an antifungal agent.

== Synthesis ==
Ethonam synthesis:

2-Aminotetralin () is alkylated with ethyl chloroacetate to afford the glycine derivative. Heating with formic acid then affords the amide (2). This compound is then reacted with ethyl formate to yield hydroxymethylene ester (3). Reaction with isothiocyanic acid gives the imidazole-2-thiol (5). The sequence may first involve hydrolysis of the formamido group, followed by addition of the amine to isothiocyanic acid; cyclization of the thiourea nitrogen with the formyl function would complete formation of the heterocycle. Desulfurization by means of Raney nickel finishes the synthesis of ethonam (6).
