= Sertraline =

SSRI antidepressant

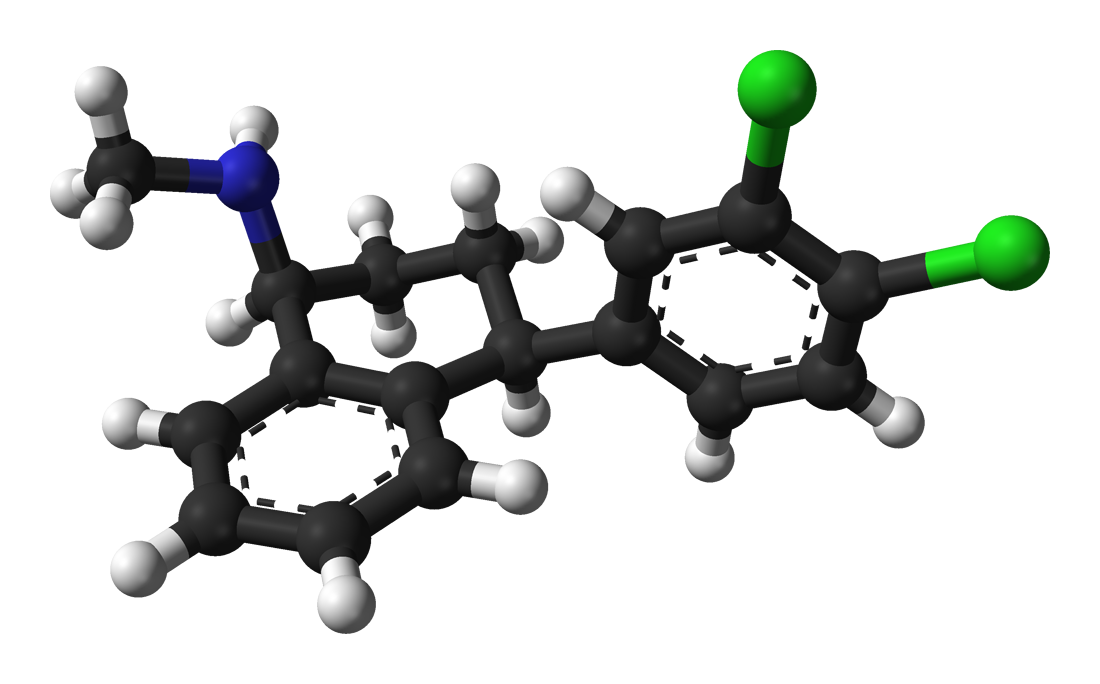

Clinical data
- Pronunciation: /ˈsɜːrtrəˌliːn/ SUR-trə-leen
- Trade names: Zoloft, others
- AHFS/Drugs.com: Monograph
- MedlinePlus: a697048
- License data: US DailyMed: Sertraline
- Pregnancy category: AU: C
- Addiction liability: None
- Routes of administration: By mouth
- Drug class: Selective serotonin reuptake inhibitor (SSRI)
- ATC code: N06AB06 (WHO)

Legal status
- Legal status: AU: S4 (Prescription only); BR: Class C1 (Other controlled substances); CA: ℞-only; NZ: Prescription only; UK: POM (Prescription only); US: ℞-only; In general: ℞ (Prescription only)

Pharmacokinetic data
- Bioavailability: ~40–45%
- Metabolism: Liver (primarily N-demethylation mainly by CYP2B6; also metabolism by CYP2C19, others)
- Metabolites: Desmethylsertraline; Others (e.g., hydroxylated metabolites, glucuronide conjugates)
- Elimination half-life: Sertraline: 26 hours (32 hours in females, 22 hours in males; range 13–45 hours); Desmethylsertraline: 62–104 hours
- Excretion: Urine (40–45%); Feces (40–45%)

Identifiers
- IUPAC name: (1S,4S)-4-(3,4-Dichlorophenyl)-N-methyl-1,2,3,4-tetrahydronaphthalen-1-amine
- CAS Number: 79617-96-2
- PubChem CID: 68617
- IUPHAR/BPS: 4798
- DrugBank: DB01104
- ChemSpider: 61881
- UNII: QUC7NX6WMB
- KEGG: D02360; as HCl: D00825
- ChEBI: CHEBI:9123
- ChEMBL: ChEMBL809
- CompTox Dashboard (EPA): DTXSID6023577

Chemical and physical data
- Formula: C_{17}H_{17}Cl_{2}N
- Molar mass: 306.23 g·mol^{−1}
- 3D model (JSmol): Interactive image
- SMILES: ClC1=CC=C([C@H]2C3=C([C@H](CC2)NC)C=CC=C3)C=C1Cl
- InChI: InChI=1S/C17H17NCl2/c1-20-17-9-7-12(13-4-2-3-5-14(13)17)11-6-8-15(18)16(19)10-11/h2-6,8,10,12,17,20H,7,9H2,1H3/t12-,17-/m0/s1; Key:VGKDLMBJGBXTGI-SJCJKPOMSA-N

Sertraline, sold under the brand name Zoloft among others, is an antidepressant medication of the selective serotonin reuptake inhibitor (SSRI) class used to treat major depressive disorder, generalized anxiety disorder, social anxiety disorder, obsessive–compulsive disorder (OCD), panic disorder, and premenstrual dysphoric disorder.

The drug shares the common side effects and contraindications of other SSRIs, with high rates of nausea, diarrhea, headache, insomnia, mild sedation, dry mouth, and sexual dysfunction, but it appears not to lead to much weight gain, and its effects on cognitive performance are mild. In some patients, sexual dysfunction may persist even after the drug is discontinued, a condition known as post-SSRI sexual dysfunction; regulatory agencies including the European Medicines Agency and Health Canada have recommended that sertraline's product labeling warn of this risk. Similar to other antidepressants, the use of sertraline for depression may be associated with a mildly elevated rate of suicidal thoughts in people under the age of 25 years old. It should not be used together with monoamine oxidase inhibitors (MAOIs): this combination may cause serotonin syndrome, which can be life-threatening in some cases. Sertraline taken during pregnancy is associated with an increase in congenital heart defects in newborns.

Sertraline was developed by scientists at Pfizer and approved for medical use in the United States in 1991. It is on the World Health Organization's List of Essential Medicines. It is available as a generic medication. In 2016, sertraline was the most commonly prescribed psychotropic medication in the United States. In 2024, it was the 12th most commonly prescribed medication in the United States, with more than 44 million prescriptions. Sertraline ranks among the top 10 most prescribed medications in Australia between 2017 and 2023.

== Medical uses ==
Sertraline has been approved for major depressive disorder, obsessive–compulsive disorder (OCD), post-traumatic stress disorder (PTSD), premenstrual dysphoric disorder, panic disorder, social anxiety disorder (SAD), and generalized anxiety disorder (GAD). Sertraline is approved for use in children with OCD.

=== Depression ===
In meta-analyses, sertraline efficacy is similar to that of other SSRI antidepressants, with an odds ratio for response in clinical depression of between 1.44 and 1.67. However, as with other antidepressants, the nature and clinical significance of this effect remain disputed. A major study of sertraline in a broad primary care population found improvements in general mental health, quality of life, and anxiety. However, it failed to find significant effects on depression in either the mildly or severely depressed, and the clinical relevance and accuracy of the positive effects found have been questioned.

In several double-blind studies, sertraline was consistently more effective than placebo for dysthymia, a more chronic variety of depression, and comparable to imipramine in that respect. Sertraline also improves the functional impairments of dysthymia to a similar degree whether group cognitive behavioral therapy is undergone or not.

Limited pediatric data also demonstrates a reduction in depressive symptoms in the pediatric population, though it remains a second-line therapy after fluoxetine.

==== Comparison with other antidepressants ====
In general, sertraline efficacy is similar to that of other antidepressants. For example, a meta-analysis of 12 new-generation antidepressants showed that sertraline and escitalopram are the best in terms of efficacy and acceptability in the acute-phase treatment of adults with depression. Comparative clinical trials demonstrated that sertraline is similar in efficacy against depression to moclobemide, nefazodone, escitalopram, bupropion, citalopram, fluvoxamine, paroxetine, venlafaxine, and mirtazapine. Sertraline may be more efficacious for the treatment of depression in the acute phase (first four weeks) than fluoxetine.

There are differences between sertraline and some other antidepressants in their efficacy in the treatment of different subtypes of depression and in their adverse effects. For severe depression, sertraline is as good as clomipramine but is better tolerated. Sertraline appears to work better in melancholic depression than fluoxetine, paroxetine, and mianserin and is similar to the tricyclic antidepressants such as amitriptyline and clomipramine. In the treatment of depression accompanied by OCD, sertraline performs significantly better than desipramine on the measures of both OCD and depression. Sertraline is equivalent to imipramine for the treatment of depression with co-morbid panic disorder, but it is better tolerated. Compared with amitriptyline, sertraline offered a greater overall improvement in quality of life of depressed patients.

==== Depression in elderly ====
Sertraline used for the treatment of depression in elderly (older than 60) patients is superior to placebo and comparable to another SSRI, fluoxetine, and tricyclic antidepressants (TCAs) amitriptyline, nortriptyline and imipramine. Sertraline has much lower rates of adverse effects than these TCAs, with the exception of nausea, which occurs more frequently with sertraline. In addition, sertraline appears to be more effective than fluoxetine or nortriptyline in the older-than-70 subgroup. Accordingly, a meta-analysis of antidepressants in older adults found that sertraline, paroxetine and duloxetine were better than placebo. However, in a 2003 trial the effect size was modest, and there was no improvement in quality of life as compared to placebo. With depression in dementia, there is no benefit of sertraline treatment compared to either placebo or mirtazapine.

=== Obsessive–compulsive disorder ===
Sertraline is effective for the treatment of OCD in adults, adolescents and children. It was better tolerated and, based on intention-to-treat analysis, performed better than the gold standard of OCD treatment clomipramine. Continuing sertraline treatment helps prevent relapses of OCD with long-term data supporting its use for up to 24 months. The sertraline dosages necessary for the effective treatment of OCD are higher than the usual dosage for depression. The onset of action is also slower for OCD than for depression. The treatment recommendation is to start treatment with half of the maximal recommended dose for at least two months. After that, the dose can be raised to the maximal recommended in the cases of unsatisfactory response.

Cognitive behavioral therapy alone is not more effective than sertraline in adolescents and children; however, a combination of these treatments is effective.

=== Panic disorder ===
Sertraline is superior to placebo for the treatment of panic disorder. The response rate was independent of the dose. In addition to decreasing the frequency of panic attacks by about 80% (vs. 45% for placebo) and decreasing general anxiety, sertraline resulted in an improvement in quality of life on most parameters. The patients rated as "improved" on sertraline reported better quality of life than the ones who "improved" on placebo. The authors of the study argued that the improvement achieved with sertraline is different and of a better quality than the improvement achieved with a placebo. Sertraline is equally effective for men and women, and for patients with or without agoraphobia. Previous unsuccessful treatment with benzodiazepines does not diminish its efficacy. However, the response rate was lower for the patients with more severe panic. Starting treatment simultaneously with sertraline and clonazepam, with subsequent gradual discontinuation of clonazepam, may accelerate the response.

Double-blind comparative studies found sertraline to have the same effect on panic disorder as paroxetine or imipramine. While imprecise, comparison of the results of trials of sertraline with separate trials of other anti-panic agents (clomipramine, imipramine, clonazepam, alprazolam, and fluvoxamine) indicates approximate equivalence of these medications.

=== Other anxiety disorders ===
Sertraline has been successfully used for the treatment of social anxiety disorder. All three major domains of the disorder (fear, avoidance, and physiological symptoms) respond to sertraline. Maintenance treatment, after the response is achieved, prevents the return of the symptoms. The improvement is greater among the patients with later, adult onset of the disorder. In a comparison trial, sertraline was superior to exposure therapy, but patients treated with the psychological intervention continued to improve during a year-long follow-up, while those treated with sertraline deteriorated after treatment termination. The combination of sertraline and cognitive behavioral therapy appears to be more effective in children and young people than either treatment alone.

Sertraline has not been approved for the treatment of generalized anxiety disorder; however, several guidelines recommend it as a first-line medication referring to good quality controlled clinical trials.

=== Premenstrual dysphoric disorder ===
Sertraline is effective in alleviating the symptoms of premenstrual dysphoric disorder, a severe form of premenstrual syndrome. Significant improvement was observed in 50–60% of cases treated with sertraline vs. 20–30% of cases on placebo. The improvement began during the first week of treatment, and in addition to mood, irritability, and anxiety, improvement was reflected in better family functioning, social activity, and general quality of life. Work functioning and physical symptoms, such as swelling, bloating, and breast tenderness, were less responsive to sertraline. Taking sertraline only during the luteal phase, that is, the 12–14 days before menses is not as effective as continuous treatment. Continuous treatment with sub-therapeutic doses of sertraline (25 mg vs. usual 50–100 mg) is also effective.

=== Other indications ===
Sertraline is approved for the treatment of post-traumatic stress disorder (PTSD). The UK's National Institute for Clinical Excellence recommends it for patients who prefer drug treatment to a psychological one. Other guidelines also suggest sertraline as a first-line option for pharmacological therapy. When necessary, long-term pharmacotherapy can be beneficial. There are both negative and positive clinical trial results for sertraline, which may be explained by the types of psychological traumas, symptoms, and comorbidities included in the various studies. Positive results were obtained in trials that included predominantly women (75%) with a majority (60%) having physical or sexual assault as the traumatic event. Somewhat contrary to the above suggestions, a meta-analysis of sertraline clinical trials for PTSD found it to be statistically superior to placebo in the reduction of PTSD symptoms but the effect size was small. Another meta-analysis relegated sertraline to the second line, proposing trauma focused psychotherapy as a first-line intervention. The authors noted that Pfizer had declined to submit the results of a negative trial for inclusion in the meta-analysis, making the results unreliable.

Sertraline, when taken daily, can be useful for the treatment of premature ejaculation. A disadvantage of sertraline is that it requires continuous daily treatment to delay ejaculation significantly.

A 2019 systematic review suggested that sertraline may be a good way to control anger, irritability, and hostility in depressed patients and patients with other comorbidities.

=== Therapeutic dosage ===
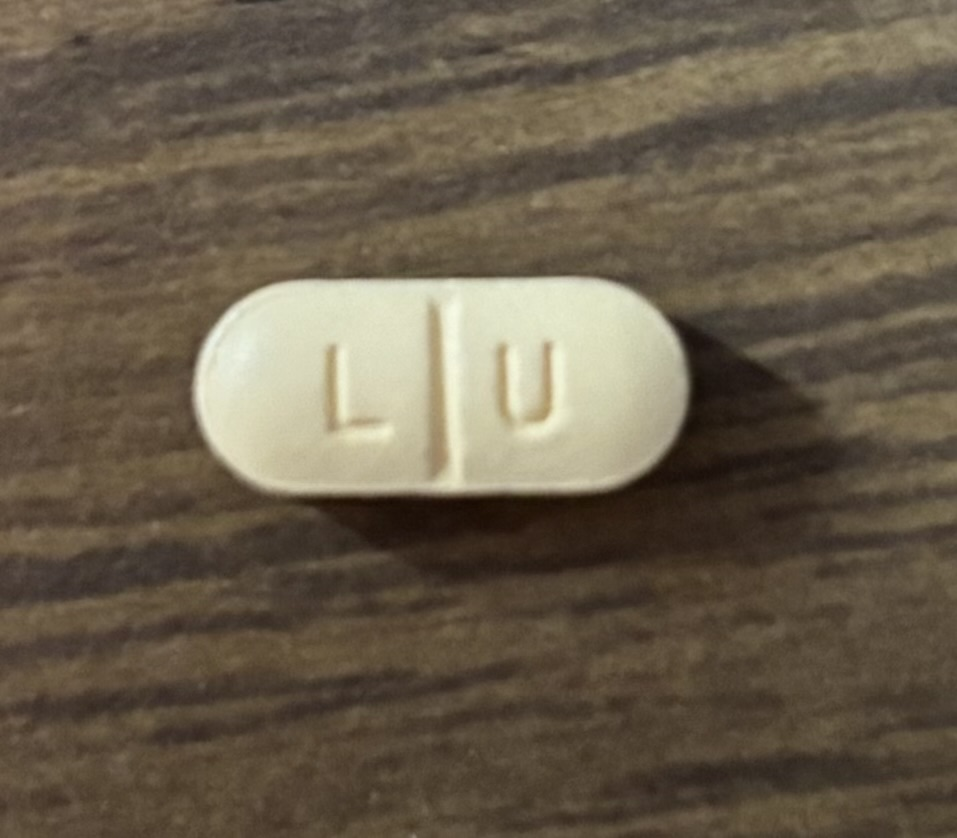
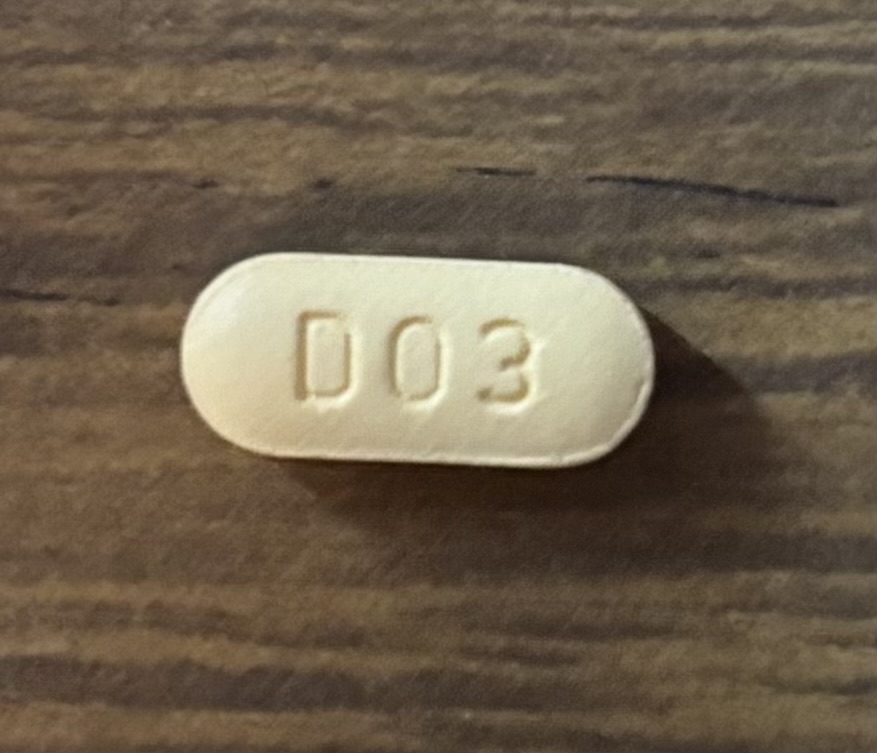
Both sides of a single 100mg Sertraline pill.

The therapeutic dosage varies according to the patient's age or clinical condition, but for all treatments with sertraline, it is recommended to start with lower dosages (25 to 50 mg/daily) and adjust according to the patient's therapeutic response, with a maximum maintenance dose of up to 200 mg per day.

== Contraindications ==
Sertraline is contraindicated in individuals taking monoamine oxidase inhibitors or the antipsychotic pimozide. Liquid formulations of sertraline contain ethanol and are therefore contraindicated with disulfiram. The prescribing information recommends that treatment of the elderly and patients with liver impairment "must be approached with caution". Due to the slower elimination of sertraline in these groups, their exposure to sertraline may be as high as three times the average exposure for the same dose.

== Side effects ==
Nausea, ejaculation failure, insomnia, diarrhea, dry mouth, somnolence, dizziness, tremor, headache, excessive sweating, fatigue and decreased libido are the common adverse effects associated with sertraline with the greatest difference from placebo. Those that most often result in interruption of the treatment are nausea, diarrhea, and insomnia. The incidence of diarrhea is higher with sertraline – especially when prescribed at higher doses – in comparison with other SSRIs.

Over more than six months of sertraline therapy for depression, people showed no significant weight increase. A 30-month-long treatment with sertraline for OCD also resulted in no significant weight gain. Although the difference did not reach statistical significance, the average weight gain was lower for fluoxetine (1%) but higher for citalopram, fluvoxamine and paroxetine (2.5%). Of the sertraline group, 4.5% gained a large amount of weight (defined as more than 7% gain). This result compares favorably with placebo, where, according to the literature, 3–6% of patients gained more than 7% of their initial weight. The large weight gain was observed only among female members of the sertraline group; the significance of this finding is unclear because of the small size of the group.

Over a two-week treatment of healthy volunteers, sertraline slightly improved verbal fluency but did not affect word learning, short-term memory, vigilance, flicker fusion time, choice reaction time, memory span, or psychomotor coordination. In spite of lower subjective rating, that is, feeling that they performed worse, no clinically relevant differences were observed in the objective cognitive performance in a group of people treated for depression with sertraline for 1.5 years as compared to healthy controls. In children and adolescents taking sertraline for six weeks for anxiety disorders, 18 out of 20 measures of memory, attention, and alertness stayed unchanged. Divided attention was improved and verbal memory under interference conditions decreased marginally. Because of the large number of measures taken, it is possible that these changes were still due to chance. The unique effect of sertraline on dopaminergic neurotransmission may be related to these effects on cognition and vigilance.

Sertraline has a low level of exposure of an infant through the breast milk and is recommended as the preferred option for the antidepressant therapy of breast-feeding mothers. However, there is 29–42% increase in congenital heart defects among children whose mothers were prescribed sertraline during pregnancy, with sertraline use in the first trimester associated with 2.7-fold increase in septal heart defects.

Abrupt interruption of sertraline treatment may result in withdrawal or discontinuation syndrome. Dizziness, insomnia, anxiety, agitation, and irritability are common symptoms. It typically occurs within a few days from drug discontinuation and lasts a few weeks. The withdrawal symptoms for sertraline are less severe and frequent than for paroxetine, and more frequent than for fluoxetine. In most cases symptoms are mild, short-lived, and resolve without treatment. More severe cases are often successfully treated by temporary reintroduction of the drug with a slower tapering-off rate.

Sertraline and SSRI antidepressants in general may be associated with bruxism, restless legs syndrome and other movement disorders. Sertraline appears to be associated with microscopic colitis, a rare condition of unknown etiology.

=== Sexual ===
Like other SSRIs, sertraline is associated with sexual side effects, including sexual arousal disorder, erectile dysfunction and difficulty achieving orgasm. While nefazodone and bupropion do not have negative effects on sexual functioning, 67% of men on sertraline experienced ejaculation difficulties versus 18% before the treatment. Sexual arousal disorder, defined as "inadequate lubrication and swelling for women and erectile difficulties for men", occurred in 12% of people on sertraline as compared with 1% of patients on placebo. The mood improvement resulting from the treatment with sertraline sometimes counteracted these side effects, so that sexual desire and overall satisfaction with sex stayed the same as before the sertraline treatment. However, under the action of placebo the desire and satisfaction slightly improved.

=== Post-SSRI sexual dysfunction ===
Post-SSRI sexual dysfunction (PSSD) is an iatrogenic condition in which sexual side effects persist after discontinuation of serotonin reuptake inhibiting antidepressants, including sertraline. Characteristic symptoms include genital numbness, pleasureless or weak orgasm, loss of libido, and erectile dysfunction; non-sexual symptoms such as emotional blunting and cognitive impairment may also occur. The condition can arise after even brief exposure to a serotonin reuptake inhibitor and may persist indefinitely; there is currently no established treatment. The DSM-5 noted in 2013 that serotonin reuptake inhibitor-induced sexual dysfunction may persist after the agent is discontinued. The UK's Medicines and Healthcare products Regulatory Agency received its first report of a sexual dysfunction persisting after an SSRI was stopped — involving fluoxetine — in 1991, and sertraline has been among the SSRIs most frequently implicated in subsequent reports.

A 2023 retrospective cohort study of over 12,000 males estimated the risk of irreversible sexual dysfunction at approximately 0.46% of patients treated with serotonergic antidepressants, including SSRIs, though the actual prevalence remains uncertain and the condition is likely underreported. A 2023 systematic review found that nearly every SSRI currently marketed has been associated with reports of PSSD, with escitalopram, citalopram, paroxetine, sertraline, and fluoxetine accounting for the majority of reported cases.

In 2019, the European Medicines Agency's Pharmacovigilance Risk Assessment Committee (PRAC) recommended that product labels for all SSRIs and SNRIs, including sertraline, be updated to state that sexual dysfunction may be long-lasting even after treatment is stopped. Health Canada followed with similar label updates in 2021. In 2024, Australia's Therapeutic Goods Administration aligned all SSRI and SNRI product information to reflect this risk, noting that sertraline already carried a warning about persistent sexual dysfunction.

=== Suicide ===
The US Food and Drug Administration (FDA) requires all antidepressants, including sertraline, to carry a boxed warning stating that antidepressants increase the risk of suicide in persons younger than 25 years. This warning is based on statistical analyses conducted by two independent groups of FDA experts that found a 100% increase of suicidal thoughts and behavior in children and adolescents, and a 50% increase in the 18–24 age group.

Suicidal ideation and behavior in clinical trials are rare. For the above analysis, the FDA combined the results of 295 trials of 11 antidepressants for psychiatric indications to obtain statistically significant results. Considered separately, sertraline use in adults decreased the odds of suicidal behavior with a marginal statistical significance of 37% or 50% depending on the statistical technique used. The authors of the FDA analysis note that "given the large number of comparisons made in this review, chance is a very plausible explanation for this difference". The more complete data submitted later by the sertraline manufacturer Pfizer indicated increased suicidal behavior. Similarly, the analysis conducted by the UK MHRA found a 50% increase of odds of suicide-related events, not reaching statistical significance, in the patients on sertraline as compared to the ones on placebo.

== Overdose ==
Acute overdosage is often manifested by emesis, lethargy, ataxia, tachycardia and seizures. Plasma, serum or blood concentrations of sertraline and norsertraline, its major active metabolite, may be measured to confirm a diagnosis of poisoning in hospitalized patients or to aid in the medicolegal investigation of fatalities. As with most other SSRIs its toxicity in overdose is considered relatively low.

== Interactions ==
As with other SSRIs, sertraline may increase the risk of bleeding with NSAIDs (ibuprofen, naproxen, mefenamic acid), antiplatelet drugs, anticoagulants, omega-3 fatty acids, vitamin E, and garlic supplements due to sertraline's inhibitory effects on platelet aggregation via blocking serotonin transporters on platelets. Sertraline, in particular, may potentially diminish the efficacy of levothyroxine.

Sertraline is a moderate inhibitor of CYP2D6 and CYP2B6 in vitro. Accordingly, in human trials it caused increased blood levels of CYP2D6 substrates such as metoprolol, dextromethorphan, desipramine, imipramine and nortriptyline, as well as the CYP3A4/CYP2D6 substrate haloperidol. This effect is dose-dependent; for example, co-administration with 50 mg of sertraline resulted in 20% greater exposure to desipramine, while 150 mg of sertraline led to a 70% increase. In a placebo-controlled study, the concomitant administration of sertraline and methadone caused a 40% increase in blood levels of the latter, which is primarily metabolized by CYP2B6. Bupropion is metabolized by CYP2B6, which is inhibited by sertraline, and this may result in an interaction between sertraline and bupropion.

Sertraline had a slight inhibitory effect on the metabolism of diazepam, tolbutamide, and warfarin, which are CYP2C9 or CYP2C19 substrates; the clinical relevance of this effect was unclear. As expected from in vitro data, sertraline did not alter the human metabolism of the CYP3A4 substrates erythromycin, alprazolam, carbamazepine, clonazepam, and terfenadine; neither did it affect metabolism of the CYP1A2 substrate clozapine.

Sertraline did not affect the actions of digoxin and atenolol, which are not metabolized in the liver. Case reports suggest that taking sertraline with phenytoin or zolpidem may induce sertraline metabolism and decrease its efficacy, and that taking sertraline with lamotrigine may increase the blood level of lamotrigine, possibly by inhibition of glucuronidation.

CYP2C19 inhibitor esomeprazole increased sertraline concentrations in blood plasma by approximately 40%.

Clinical reports indicate that interaction between sertraline and the MAOIs isocarboxazid and tranylcypromine may cause serotonin syndrome. In a placebo-controlled study in which sertraline was co-administered with lithium, 35% of the subjects experienced tremors, while none of those taking placebo did.

Grapefruit should be avoided due to it inhibiting the CYP3A4 enzyme that metabolises the breakdown of sertraline, causing increased levels of sertraline in the blood serum.

== Pharmacology ==
=== Pharmacodynamics ===
Molecular targets of sertraline
Site	K_{i} (nM)	Species	References
SERT	0.15–3.3	Human	
NET	420–925	Human	
DAT	22–315	Human	
5-HT_{1A}	35000+	Human	
5-HT_{2A}	2207	Rat	
5-HT_{2C}	2298	Pig	
α_{1A}	1900	Human	
α_{1B}	3500	Human	
α_{1D}	2500	Human	
α_{2}	477–4100	Human	
D_{2}	10700	Human	
H_{1}	24000	Human	
mACh	427–2100	Human	
σ_{1}	32–57	Rat	
σ_{2}	5297	Rat	
M_{3}	5886	Human	
Values are K_{i} (nM), unless otherwise noted. The smaller the value, the more strongly the drug binds to or inhibits the site.

Sertraline is a selective serotonin reuptake inhibitor (SSRI). By binding to the serotonin transporter (SERT) it inhibits neuronal reuptake of serotonin and potentiates serotonergic activity in the central nervous system. Over time, this leads to a downregulation of pre-synaptic 5-HT_{1A} receptors, which is associated with an improvement in passive stress tolerance, and delayed downstream increase in expression of brain-derived neurotrophic factor (BDNF), which may contribute to a reduction in negative affective biases. It does not significantly affect histamine, acetylcholine, GABA or benzodiazepine receptors.

Sertraline also shows relatively high activity as an inhibitor of the dopamine transporter (DAT) occupying ~20% of DAT receptors at doses 200mg and above, and antagonist of the sigma σ_{1} receptor (but not the σ_{2} receptor). However, sertraline affinity for its main target (SERT) is much greater than its affinity for σ_{1} receptor and DAT. Although there could be a role for the σ_{1} receptor in the pharmacology of sertraline, the significance of this receptor in its actions is unclear. Similarly, the clinical relevance of sertraline's blockade of the dopamine transporter is uncertain.

Sertraline is a REDD1-dependent mTOR inhibitor. It blocks AKT/mTOR pathway and has autophagy-inducing activity.

=== Pharmacokinetics ===
Desmethylsertraline, the major metabolite of sertraline

==== Absorption ====
Following a single oral dose of sertraline, mean peak blood levels of sertraline occur between 4.5 and 8.4 hours. Bioavailability is likely linear and dose-proportional over a dose range of 150 to 200 mg. Concomitant intake of sertraline with food slightly increases sertraline peak levels and total exposure. There is an approximate 2-fold accumulation of sertraline with continuous administration and steady-state levels are reached within one week.

==== Distribution ====
Sertraline is highly plasma protein bound (98.5%) across a concentration range of 20 to 500 ng/mL. Despite the high plasma protein binding, sertraline and its metabolite desmethylsertraline at respective tested concentrations of 300 ng/mL and 200 ng/mL were found not to interfere with the plasma protein binding of warfarin and propranolol, two other highly plasma protein-bound drugs.

==== Metabolism ====
Sertraline is subject to extensive first-pass metabolism, as indicated by a small study of radiolabeled sertraline in which less than 5% of plasma radioactivity was unchanged sertraline in two males. The principal metabolic pathway for sertraline is N-demethylation into desmethylsertraline (N-desmethylsertraline) mainly by CYP2B6. Reduction, hydroxylation, and glucuronide conjugation of both sertraline and desmethylsertraline also occur. Desmethylsertraline, while pharmacologically active, is substantially (50-fold) weaker than sertraline as a serotonin reuptake inhibitor and its influence on the clinical effects of sertraline is thought to be negligible. Based on in vitro studies, sertraline is metabolized by multiple cytochrome 450 isoforms; however, it appears that in the human body CYP2C19 plays the most important role, followed by CYP2B6. In addition to the cytochrome P450 system, sertraline can be oxidatively deaminated in vitro by monoamine oxidases; however, this metabolic pathway has never been studied in vivo.

==== Elimination ====
The elimination half-life of sertraline is on average 26 hours, with a range of 13 to 45 hours. The elimination half-life of desmethylsertraline is 62 to 104 hours.

In a small study of two people, sertraline was excreted to similar degrees in urine and feces (40 to 45% each within 9 days). Unchanged sertraline was not detectable in urine, whereas 12 to 14% of unchanged sertraline was present in feces.

=== Pharmacogenomics ===
CYP2C19 and CYP2B6 are thought to be the key cytochrome P450 enzymes involved in the metabolism of sertraline. Relative to CYP2C19 normal (extensive) metabolizers, poor metabolizers have 2.7-fold higher levels of sertraline and intermediate metabolizers have 1.4-fold higher levels. In contrast, CYP2B6 poor metabolizers have 1.6-fold higher levels of sertraline and intermediate metabolizers have 1.2-fold higher levels.

== Chemistry ==
In terms of chemical structure, sertraline is a 1-aminotetralin. Several notable analogues sertraline are known, including desmethylsertraline, dasotraline, tametraline, and lometraline.

== History ==
Skeletal formulae of thiothixene, lometraline and tametraline, from which sertraline was derived. Commonalities to the structure of sertraline are highlighted in red.

The history of sertraline dates to the early 1970s when Pfizer chemist Reinhard Sarges invented a novel series of psychoactive compounds, including lometraline, based on the structures of the neuroleptics thiothixene and pinoxepin. Further work on these compounds led to tametraline, a norepinephrine and weaker dopamine reuptake inhibitor. Development of tametraline was soon stopped because of undesired stimulant effects observed in animals. A few years later, in 1977, pharmacologist Kenneth Koe, after comparing the structural features of a variety of reuptake inhibitors, became interested in the tametraline series. He asked another Pfizer chemist, Willard Welch, to synthesize some previously unexplored tametraline derivatives. Welch generated several potent norepinephrine and triple reuptake inhibitors, but to the surprise of the scientists, one representative of the generally inactive cis-analogs was a serotonin reuptake inhibitor. Welch then prepared stereoisomers of this compound, which were tested in vivo by animal behavioral scientist Albert Weissman. The most potent and selective (+)-isomer (Note: Also known as "cis-(1S,4S)". Out of all four possible enantiomers, cis-(1R,4R) is also active on the serotonin transporter, and trans-(1R,4S) is an SNDRI.) was taken into further development and eventually named sertraline. Weissman and Koe recalled that the group did not set up to produce an antidepressant of the SSRI type—in that sense their inquiry was not "very goal driven", and the invention of the sertraline molecule was serendipitous. According to Welch, they worked outside the mainstream at Pfizer, and even "did not have a formal project team". The group had to overcome initial bureaucratic reluctance to pursue sertraline development, as Pfizer was considering licensing an antidepressant candidate from another company.

Sertraline was approved by the US Food and Drug Administration (FDA) in 1991 based on the recommendation of the Psychopharmacological Drugs Advisory Committee; it had already become available in the United Kingdom the previous year. The FDA committee achieved a consensus that sertraline was safe and effective for the treatment of major depression. During the discussion, Paul Leber, the director of the FDA Division of Neuropharmacological Drug Products, noted that granting approval was a "tough decision", since the treatment effect on outpatients with depression had been "modest to minimal". Other experts emphasized that the drug's effect on inpatients had not differed from placebo and criticized the poor design of the clinical trials by Pfizer. For example, 40% of participants dropped out of the trials, significantly decreasing their validity.

Until 2002, sertraline was only approved for use in adults ages 18 and over; that year, it was approved by the FDA for use in treating children aged 6 or older with severe OCD. In 2003, the UK Medicines and Healthcare products Regulatory Agency issued guidance that, apart from fluoxetine (Prozac), SSRIs are not suitable for the treatment of depression in patients under 18. However, sertraline can still be used in the UK for the treatment of OCD in children and adolescents. In 2005, the FDA added a boxed warning concerning pediatric suicidal behavior to all antidepressants, including sertraline. In 2007, labeling was again changed to add a warning regarding suicidal behavior in young adults ages 18 to 24.

== Society and culture ==
=== Generic availability ===
The US patent for Zoloft expired in 2006, and sertraline is available in generic form and is marketed under many brand names worldwide.

=== Brand names ===
In the US, Zoloft is marketed by Viatris after Upjohn was spun off from Pfizer.

=== Interest during COVID-19 pandemic ===
Sertraline has been the most sought-after antidepressant worldwide before, during, and after the COVID-19 pandemic, according to Google Trends data. The pandemic has led to an increase in searches for antidepressants, with sertraline, fluoxetine, duloxetine, and venlafaxine showing the highest search volumes, whereas searches of citalopram decreased during the pandemic.

== Research ==
Sertraline may be useful to treat murine Zaire ebolavirus (murine EBOV). The World Health Organization (WHO) considers this a promising area of research.

Lass-Flörl et al., 2003 finds it significantly inhibits phospholipase B in the fungal genus Candida, reducing virulence.

Sertraline is also an effective leishmanicide. Specifically, Palit & Ali 2008 find that sertraline kills almost all promastigotes of Leishmania donovani.

Sertraline is strongly antibacterial against some species. It is also known to act as a photosensitizer of bacterial surfaces. In combination with antibacterials its photosensitization effect reverses antibacterial resistance. As such sertraline shows promise for food preservation.

Lass-Flörl et al., 2003 finds this compound acts as a fungicide against Candida parapsilosis. Its anti-Cp effect is indeed due to its serotonergic activity and not its other effects.

Sertraline is a promising trypanocide. It acts at several different life stages and against several strains. Sertraline's trypanocidal mechanism of action is by way of interference with bioenergetics.

When mothers take sertraline during pregnancy, there is research evidence that the newborn may experience sertraline withdrawal symptoms.

== See also ==
- List of antidepressants
