= Lometraline =

Chemical compound

Clinical data
- Other names: N,N-dimethyl-8-chloro-5-methoxy-1-aminotetralin
- ATC code: None

Identifiers
- IUPAC name: 8-chloro-5-methoxy-N,N-dimethyl-1,2,3,4-tetrahydro-1-naphthalenamine
- CAS Number: 39951-65-0 34552-78-8 (hydrochloride)
- PubChem CID: 34789
- ChemSpider: 32014
- UNII: V78B234QEY
- KEGG: D02669
- ChEMBL: ChEMBL2111119
- CompTox Dashboard (EPA): DTXSID70865981

Chemical and physical data
- Formula: C_{13}H_{18}ClNO
- Molar mass: 239.74 g·mol^{−1}
- 3D model (JSmol): Interactive image
- SMILES: Clc1ccc(OC)c2c1C(N(C)C)CCC2
- InChI: InChI=1S/C13H18ClNO/c1-15(2)11-6-4-5-9-12(16-3)8-7-10(14)13(9)11/h7-8,11H,4-6H2,1-3H3; Key:MTWNWMGGMZUIMZ-UHFFFAOYSA-N

Lometraline (INN; developmental code name CP-14,368) is a drug and an aminotetralin derivative. A structural modification of tricyclic neuroleptics, lometraline was originally patented by Pfizer as an antipsychotic, tranquilizer, and antiparkinsonian agent. However, it was instead later studied as a potential antidepressant and/or anxiolytic agent, though clinical studies revealed no psychoactivity at the doses used and further investigation was suspended. Further experimental modifications of the chemical structure of lometraline resulted in the discovery of tametraline, a potent inhibitor of the reuptake of dopamine and norepinephrine, which in turn led to the discovery of the antidepressant sertraline, a selective serotonin reuptake inhibitor (SSRI).
