= Citalopram =

SSRI antidepressant

- (R)-(−)-citalopram (top), (S)-(+)-citalopram (bottom)

Clinical data
- Pronunciation: /saɪˈtæləˌpræm, sɪ-/; sy-TA-lə-pram
- Trade names: Celexa, Cipramil, Talam, others
- AHFS/Drugs.com: Monograph
- MedlinePlus: a699001
- License data: US DailyMed: Citalopram
- Pregnancy category: AU: C
- Dependence liability: Low
- Routes of administration: oral, intravenous
- Drug class: Selective serotonin reuptake inhibitor (SSRI)
- ATC code: N06AB04 (WHO)

Legal status
- Legal status: AU: S4 (Prescription only); BR: Class C1 (Other controlled substances); CA: ℞-only; UK: POM (Prescription only); US: ℞-only

Pharmacokinetic data
- Bioavailability: 80% peak at 4 hours
- Protein binding: <80%
- Metabolism: Liver (CYP3A4 and CYP2C19)
- Metabolites: Desmethylcitalopram (DCT) and didesmethylcitalopram (DDCT)
- Elimination half-life: 35 hours
- Excretion: Mostly as unmetabolized citalopram, partly DCT, and traces of DDCT in urine

Identifiers
- IUPAC name: (RS)-1-[3-(Dimethylamino)propyl]-1-(4-fluorophenyl)-1,3-dihydroisobenzofuran-5-carbonitrile
- CAS Number: 59729-33-8
- PubChem CID: 2771
- IUPHAR/BPS: 7547
- DrugBank: DB00215
- ChemSpider: 2669
- UNII: 0DHU5B8D6V
- KEGG: D07704; as salt: D00822
- ChEBI: CHEBI:3723
- ChEMBL: ChEMBL549
- CompTox Dashboard (EPA): DTXSID8022826
- ECHA InfoCard: 100.056.247

Chemical and physical data
- Formula: C_{20}H_{21}FN_{2}O
- Molar mass: 324.399 g·mol^{−1}
- 3D model (JSmol): Interactive image
- Chirality: Racemic mixture
- SMILES: Fc1ccc(cc1)C3(OCc2cc(C#N)ccc23)CCCN(C)C
- InChI: InChI=1S/C20H21FN2O/c1-23(2)11-3-10-20(17-5-7-18(21)8-6-17)19-9-4-15(13-22)12-16(19)14-24-20/h4-9,12H,3,10-11,14H2,1-2H3; Key:WSEQXVZVJXJVFP-UHFFFAOYSA-N

Citalopram, sold under the brand name Celexa among others, is an antidepressant of the selective serotonin reuptake inhibitor (SSRI) class. It is used to treat major depressive disorder, obsessive–compulsive disorder, panic disorder, and social anxiety disorder. The antidepressant effects may take one to four weeks to occur. It is typically taken orally (swallowed by mouth). In some European countries, it is sometimes given intravenously (injected into a vein) to initiate treatment, before switching to the oral route of administration for continuation of treatment. It has also been used intravenously in other parts of the world in some other circumstances.

Common side effects include nausea, trouble sleeping, sexual problems, shakiness, feeling tired, and sweating. In some patients, sexual dysfunction may persist even after the drug is discontinued, a condition known as post-SSRI sexual dysfunction; regulatory agencies including the European Medicines Agency and Health Canada have recommended that citalopram's product labeling warn of this risk. Serious side effects include an increased risk of suicide in those under the age of 25, serotonin syndrome, glaucoma, and QT prolongation.

Citalopram was approved for medical use in the United States in 1998. It is on the World Health Organization's List of Essential Medicines. It is available as a generic medication. In 2023, it was the 43rd most commonly prescribed medication in the United States, with more than 14 million prescriptions.

== Medical uses ==
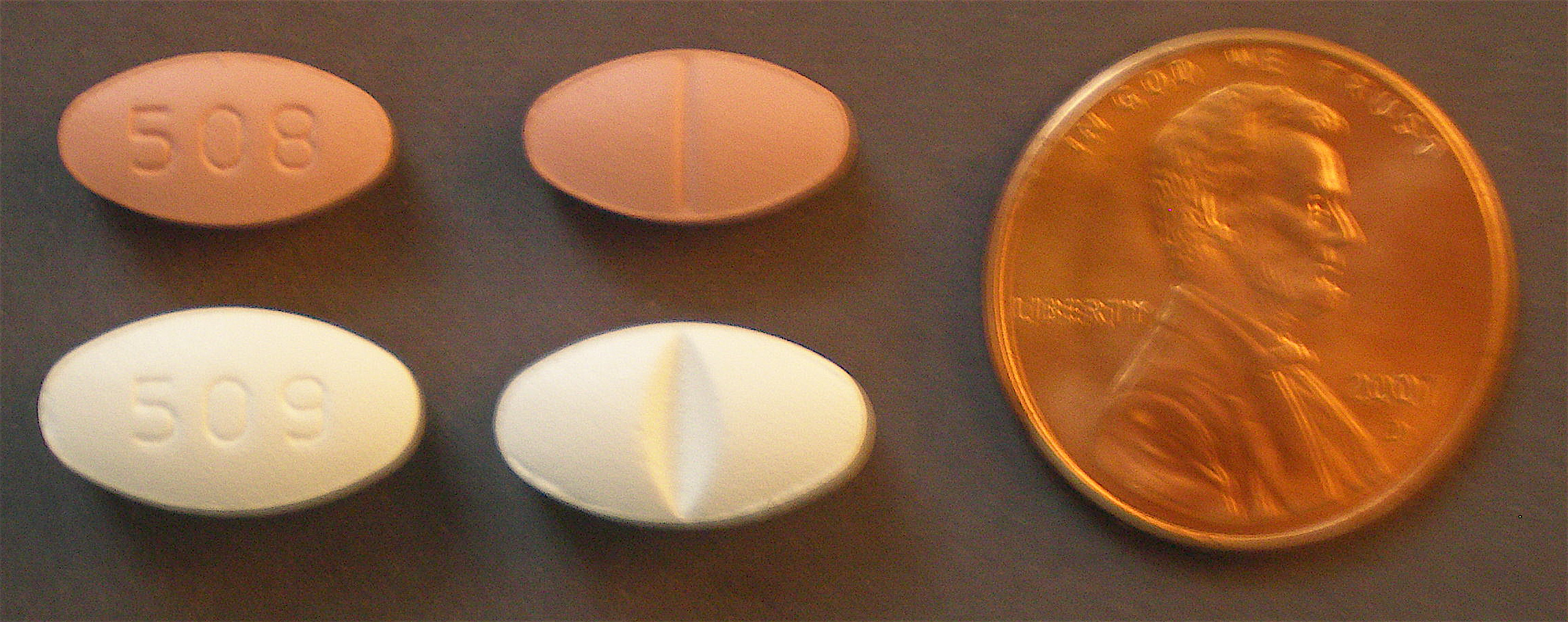
Citalopram HBr tablets in 20-mg (coral, marked 508) and 40-mg (white, marked 509), and a United States one-cent coin (size 19.05 mm/0.75 in)

=== Depression ===
In the United States, citalopram is approved to treat major depressive disorder. Citalopram appears to have comparable efficacy and superior tolerability relative to other antidepressants. In the National Institute for Health and Clinical Excellence ranking of ten antidepressants for efficacy and cost-effectiveness, citalopram is fifth in effectiveness (after mirtazapine, escitalopram, venlafaxine, and sertraline) and fourth in cost-effectiveness.

Evidence for the effectiveness of citalopram for treating depression in children is uncertain.

=== Panic disorder ===
Citalopram is licensed in the UK and other European countries for panic disorder, with or without agoraphobia.

=== Other ===
Citalopram may be used off-label to treat anxiety, and dysthymia, premenstrual dysphoric disorder, body dysmorphic disorder, and obsessive–compulsive disorder.

It appears to be as effective as fluvoxamine and paroxetine in obsessive–compulsive disorder. Some data suggest the effectiveness of intravenous infusion of citalopram in resistant OCD. Citalopram is well tolerated and as effective as moclobemide in social anxiety disorder. There are studies suggesting that citalopram can be useful in reducing aggressive and impulsive behavior. It appears to be superior to placebo for behavioural disturbances associated with dementia. It has also been used successfully for hypersexuality in early Alzheimer's disease.

A meta-analysis, including studies with fluoxetine, paroxetine, sertraline, escitalopram, and citalopram versus placebo, showed SSRIs to be effective in reducing symptoms of premenstrual syndrome, whether taken continuously or just in the luteal phase. For alcoholism, citalopram has produced a modest reduction alcohol intake and increase in drink-free days in studies of alcoholics, possibly by decreasing desire or reducing the reward.

While on its own citalopram is less effective than amitriptyline in the prevention of migraines, in refractory cases, combination therapy may be more effective.

Citalopram and other SSRIs can be used to treat hot flashes.

A 2009 multisite randomized controlled study found no benefit and some adverse effects in autistic children from citalopram, raising doubts about whether SSRIs are effective for treating repetitive behavior in children with autism.

Some research suggests citalopram interacts with cannabinoid protein-couplings in the rat brain, and this is put forward as a potential cause of some of the drug's antidepressant effects.

== Administration ==
Citalopram is typically taken in one dose, either in the morning or evening. It can be taken with or without food. Its absorption does not increase when taken with food, but doing so can help prevent nausea. Nausea is often caused when the 5-HT_{3} receptors actively absorb free serotonin, as this receptor is present within the digestive tract.

== Adverse effects ==
Citalopram theoretically causes side effects by increasing the concentration of serotonin in other parts of the body (e.g., the intestines). Other side effects, such as increased apathy and emotional flattening, may be caused by the decrease in dopamine release associated with increased serotonin. Citalopram is also a mild antihistamine, which may be responsible for some of its sedating properties.

Other common side effects of citalopram include drowsiness, insomnia, nausea, weight changes (usually weight gain), increase in appetite, vivid dreaming, frequent urination, dry mouth, increased sweating, trembling, diarrhea, excessive yawning, severe tinnitus, and fatigue. Less common side effects include bruxism, vomiting, cardiac arrhythmia, blood pressure changes, dilated pupils, anxiety, mood swings, headache, hyperactivity and dizziness. Rare side effects include convulsions, hallucinations, severe allergic reactions and photosensitivity. If sedation occurs, the dose may be taken at bedtime rather than in the morning. Some data suggest citalopram may cause nightmares. Citalopram is associated with a higher risk of arrhythmia than other SSRIs.

Citalopram and other SSRIs can induce a mixed state, especially in those with undiagnosed bipolar disorder. One of the other rare side effects of citalopram is visual snow syndrome which does not resolve after the discontinuation of the medicine.

=== Post-SSRI sexual dysfunction ===
Sexual dysfunction is a common side effect of citalopram and other SSRIs. In some patients, these effects persist after discontinuation of the drug, a condition known as post-SSRI sexual dysfunction (PSSD). Characteristic symptoms include genital numbness, pleasureless or weak orgasm, loss of libido, and erectile dysfunction; non-sexual symptoms such as emotional blunting and cognitive impairment may also occur. The condition can arise after even brief exposure to a serotonin reuptake inhibitor and may persist indefinitely; there is currently no established treatment. The DSM-5 noted in 2013 that serotonin reuptake inhibitor-induced sexual dysfunction may persist after the agent is discontinued.

A 2023 retrospective cohort study of over 12,000 males estimated the risk of irreversible sexual dysfunction at approximately 0.46% of patients treated with serotonergic antidepressants, including SSRIs, though the actual prevalence remains uncertain and the condition is likely underreported. A 2023 systematic review found that citalopram was the second most frequently reported SSRI in PSSD case reports, after escitalopram.

In 2019, the European Medicines Agency's Pharmacovigilance Risk Assessment Committee (PRAC) recommended that product labels for all SSRIs and SNRIs, including citalopram, be updated to state that sexual dysfunction may be long-lasting even after treatment is stopped. Health Canada followed with similar label updates in 2021. In 2024, Australia's Therapeutic Goods Administration aligned all SSRI and SNRI product information to reflect this risk; citalopram was among the products requiring updated warnings.

=== Abnormal heart rhythm ===
In August 2011, the FDA announced, "Citalopram causes dose-dependent QT interval prolongation. Citalopram should no longer be prescribed at doses greater than 40 mg per day". A further clarification, issued in March 2012, restricted the maximum dose to 20 mg for subgroups of patients, including those older than 60 years and those taking an inhibitor of cytochrome P450 2C19.7.

=== Endocrine effects ===
As with other SSRIs, citalopram can cause an increase in serum prolactin level. Citalopram has no significant effect on insulin sensitivity in women of reproductive age and no changes in glycaemic control were seen in another trial.

=== Exposure in pregnancy ===
Antidepressant exposure (including citalopram) during pregnancy is associated with shorter duration of gestation (by three days), increased risk of preterm delivery (by 55%), lower birth weight (by 75 g), and lower Apgar scores (by <0.4 points). Antidepressant exposure is not associated with an increased risk of spontaneous abortion. It is uncertain whether there is an increased prevalence of septal heart defects among children whose mothers were prescribed an SSRI in early pregnancy.

=== Overdose ===
Overdosage may result in vomiting, sedation, disturbances in heart rhythm, dizziness, sweating, nausea, tremors, and rarely amnesia, confusion, coma, or convulsions. Overdose deaths have occurred, sometimes involving other drugs, but also with citalopram as the sole agent. Citalopram and N-desmethylcitalopram may be quantified in blood or plasma to confirm a diagnosis of poisoning in hospitalized patients or to assist in a medicolegal death investigation. Blood or plasma citalopram concentrations are usually in a range of 50-400 μg/L in persons receiving the drug therapeutically, 1000–3000 μg/L in patients who survive acute overdosage, and 3–30 mg/L in those who do not survive. It is the most dangerous of SSRIs in overdose.

=== Suicidality ===
In the United States, citalopram carries a boxed warning stating it may increase suicidal thinking and behavior in those under age 24.

=== Discontinuation syndrome ===
SSRI discontinuation syndrome has been reported when treatment is stopped. It includes sensory, and gastrointestinal symptoms, dizziness, lethargy, and sleep disturbances, as well as psychological symptoms such as anxiety/agitation, irritability, and poor concentration. Electric shock-like sensations are typical for SSRI discontinuation. Withdrawal symptoms can occur when this medicine is suddenly stopped, such as paraesthesiae, sleeping problems (difficulty sleeping and intense dreams), feeling dizzy, agitated or anxious, nausea, vomiting, tremors, confusion, sweating, headache, diarrhea, palpitations, changes in emotions, irritability, and eye or eyesight problems. Citalopram doses should be reduced gradually when treatment is finished.

== Interactions ==
=== Serotonin syndrome ===
Citalopram should not be taken with St John's wort, tryptophan or 5-HTP as the resulting drug interaction could lead to serotonin syndrome. With St John's wort, this may be caused by compounds in the plant extract reducing the efficacy of the hepatic cytochrome P450 enzymes that process citalopram. Tryptophan and 5-HTP are precursors to serotonin. When taken with an SSRI, such as citalopram, this can lead to levels of serotonin that can be lethal. This may also be the case when SSRIs are taken with SRAs (serotonin releasing agents) such as in the case of MDMA. It is possible that SSRIs could reduce the effects associated with an SRA since SSRIs stop the reuptake of Serotonin by blocking SERT. This would allow less serotonin in and out of the transporters, thus decreasing the likelihood of neurotoxic effects. However, these concerns are still disputed as the exact pharmacodynamic effects of citalopram and MDMA have yet to be fully identified. Citalopram is contraindicated in individuals taking MAOIs, owing to a potential for serotonin syndrome.

=== Other interactions ===
SSRIs, including citalopram, can increase the risk of bleeding, especially when coupled with aspirin, NSAIDs, warfarin, or other anticoagulants. Taking citalopram with omeprazole may cause higher blood levels of citalopram. This is a potentially dangerous interaction, so dosage adjustments may be needed or alternatives may be prescribed.

== Pharmacology ==
=== Pharmacodynamics ===
Citalopram contains two pharmacodynamically distinct enantiomers: (S)-citalopram (escitalopram) and (R)-citalopram. (S)-citalopram is a highly selective serotonin reuptake inhibitor and is thought to be responsible for most of the SRI activity of citalopram. (R)-citalopram, by comparison, is a 20-fold less potent SERT inhibitor and antagonizes the actions of (S)-citalopram at this site. The mechanism of antagonism is uncertain, but may involve kinetic interactions between the two; it has been proposed that the long-lasting inhibited state of SERT induced by (S)-citalopram may be attenuated by (R)-citalopram binding.

Citalopram has a ~6-fold higher affinity for H1 histamine receptors than (S)-citalopram (K_{i} = 257nM vs 1500nM), though the clinical significance of this difference is unknown. Both citalopram and escitalopram have similar affinities for the σ1 receptor (K_{i} = 50nM).

=== Pharmacokinetics ===
Citalopram is considered safe and well tolerated in the therapeutic dose range. Distinct from some other agents in its class, it exhibits linear pharmacokinetics and minimal drug interaction potential, making it a better choice for the elderly or comorbid patients.

== Stereochemistry ==
Citalopram has one stereocenter, to which a 4-fluoro phenyl group and an N, N-dimethyl-3-aminopropyl group bind. As a result of this chirality, the molecule exists in (two) enantiomeric forms (mirror images). They are termed S-(+)-citalopram and R-(–)-citalopram.

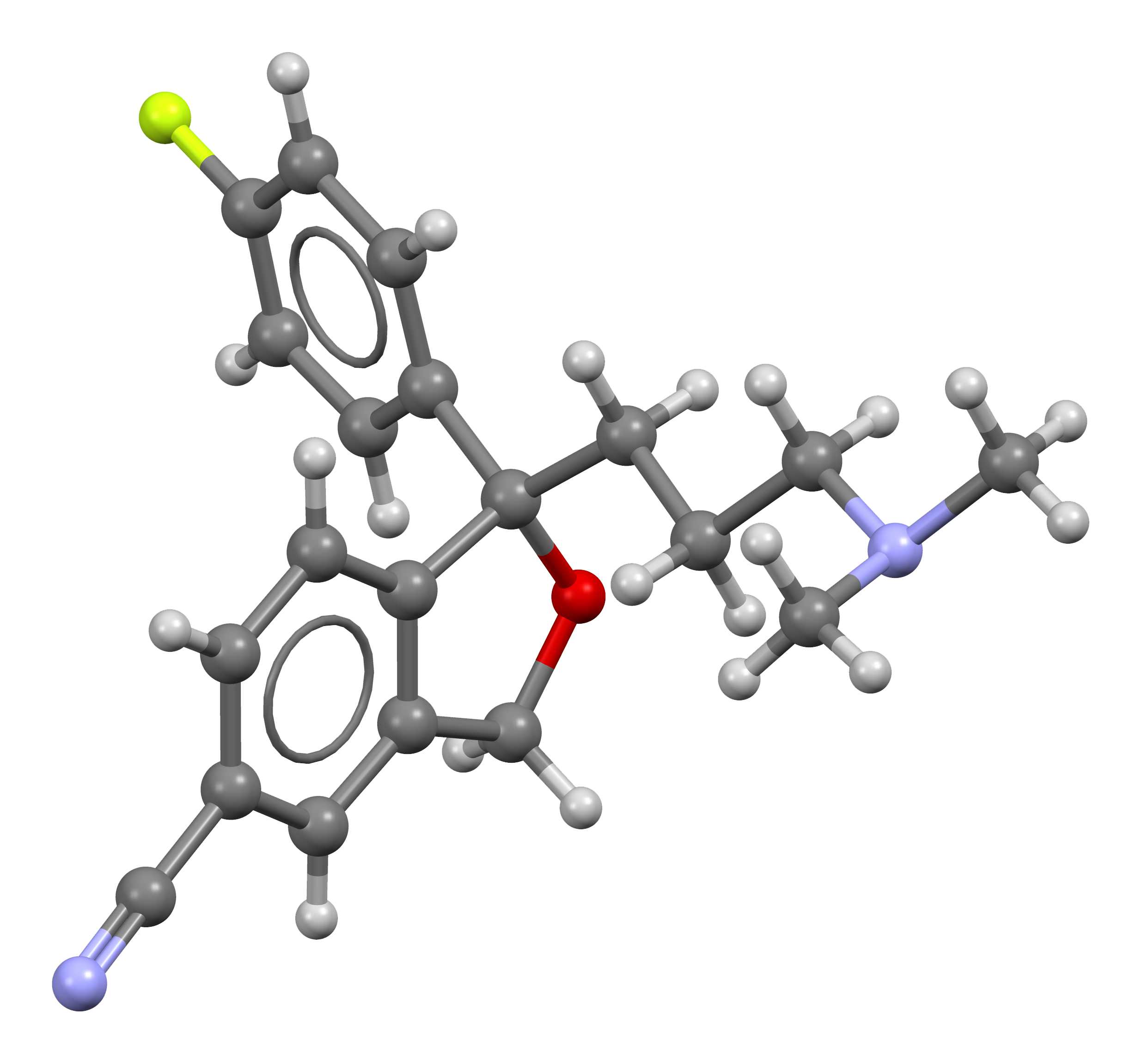

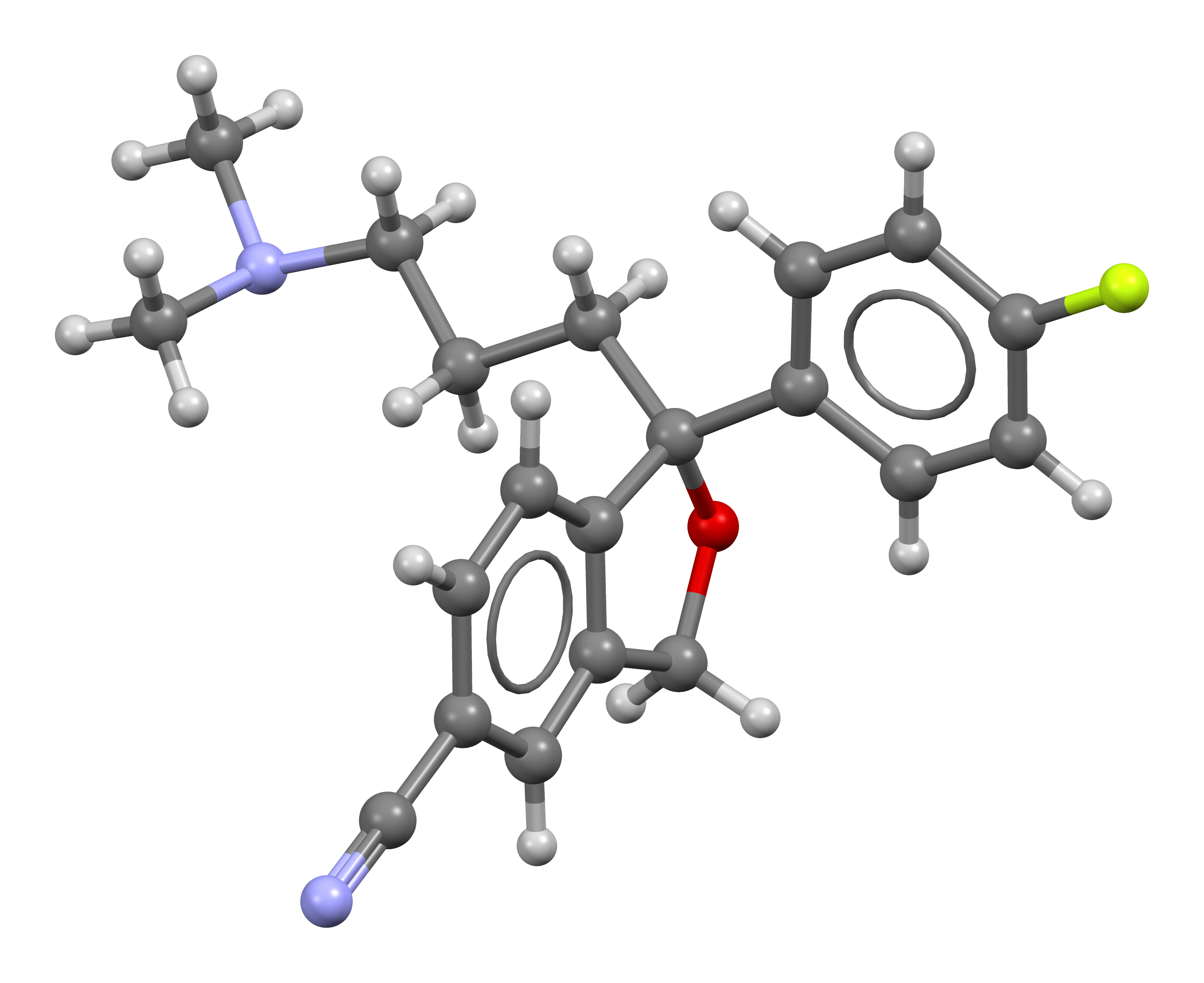

(S)-(+)-citalopram

(R)-(–)-citalopram

Citalopram is sold as a racemic mixture, consisting of 50% (R)-(−)-citalopram and 50% (S)-(+)-citalopram. Only the (S)-(+) enantiomer has the desired antidepressant effect. Lundbeck now markets the (S)-(+) enantiomer, the generic name of which is escitalopram. Whereas citalopram is supplied as the hydrobromide, escitalopram is sold as the oxalate salt (hydrooxalate). In both cases, the salt forms of the amine make these otherwise lipophilic compounds water-soluble.

== Metabolism ==
Citalopram is metabolized in the liver mostly by CYP2C19, but also by CYP3A4 and CYP2D6. Metabolites desmethylcitalopram and didesmethylcitalopram are significantly less energetic and their contribution to the overall action of citalopram is negligible. The half-life of citalopram is about 35 hours. Approximately 80% is cleared by the liver and 20% by the kidneys. The elimination process is slower in the elderly and in patients with liver or kidney failure. With once-daily dosing, steady plasma concentrations are achieved in about a week. Potent inhibitors of CYP2C19 and 3A4 might decrease citalopram clearance. Tobacco smoke exposure was found to inhibit the biotransformation of citalopram in animals, suggesting that the elimination rate of citalopram is decreased after tobacco smoke exposure. After intragastric administration, the half-life of the racemic mixture of citalopram was increased by about 287%.

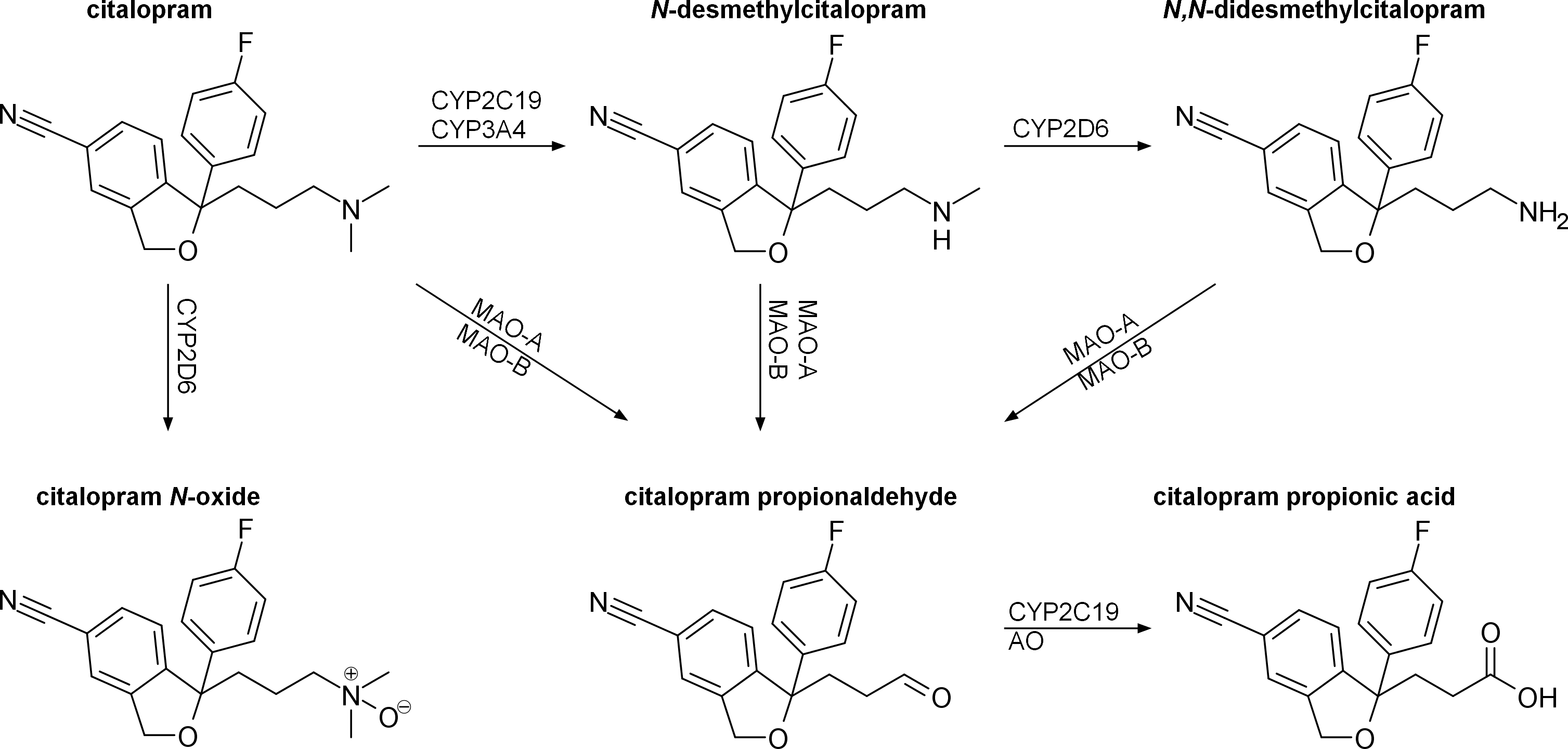
Metabolism of citalopram in humans

Binding profile
Receptor	K_{i} (nM)
SERT	1.6
NET	6190
5-HT_{2C}	617
α_{1}	1211
M_{1}	1430
H_{1}	283

== History ==
Citalopram was first synthesized in 1972 by chemist Klaus Bøgesø and his research group at the pharmaceutical company Lundbeck and was first marketed in 1989 in Denmark. It was first marketed in the US in 1998. The original patent expired in 2003, allowing other companies to legally produce and market generic versions.

== Society and culture ==
=== Brand names ===
Citalopram is sold under these brand names:

- Akarin (Denmark, Nycomed)
- C Pram S (India)
- Celapram (Australia, New Zealand),
- Celexa (U.S. and Canada, Forest Laboratories, Inc.)
- Celica (Australia)
- Ciazil (Australia, New Zealand)
- Cilate (South Africa)
- Cilift (South Africa)
- Cipram (Denmark, Turkey, H. Lundbeck A/S)
- Cipramil (Australia, Brazil, Belgium, Chile, Finland, Germany, Netherlands, Iceland, Ireland, Israel, New Zealand, Norway, Russia, South Africa, Sweden, United Kingdom)
- Cipraned, Cinapen (Greece)
- Ciprapine (Ireland)
- Ciprotan (Ireland)
- Citabax, Citaxin (Poland)
- Cital (Poland)
- Citalec (Czech Republic, Slovakia)
- Citalex (Iran, Serbia)
- Citalo (Australia, Egypt, Pakistan)
- Citalopram (Canada, Denmark, Finland, Germany, Ireland, The Netherlands, New Zealand, Spain, Sweden, Switzerland, United Kingdom, U.S.)
- Citol (Russia, Turkey)
- Citox (Mexico)
- Citrol (Europe and Australia)
- Citta (Brazil)
- Dalsan (Eastern Europe)
- Denyl (Brazil)
- Depram (Egypt)
- Elopram (Italy)
- Estar (Pakistan)
- Humorup (Argentina)
- Humorap (Peru, Bolivia)
- Lopraxer (Greece)
- Oropram (Iceland, Actavis),
- Opra (Russia)
- Pram (Russia)
- Pramcit (Pakistan)
- Procimax (Brazil)
- Recital (Israel, Thrima Inc. for Unipharm Ltd.)
- Sepram (Finland)
- Seropram (various European countries, including the Czech Republic)
- Szetalo (India)
- Talam (Europe and Australia)
- Temperax (Argentina, Chile, Peru)
- Vodelax (Turkey)
- Zentius (South America, by Roemmers and Recalcine)
- Zetalo (India)
- Cipratal (Kuwait, GCC)
- Zylotex (Portugal)

=== European Commission fine ===
On 19 June 2013, the European Commission imposed a fine of €93.8 million on the Danish pharmaceutical company Lundbeck, plus a total of €52.2 million on several generic pharmaceutical-producing companies. This was in response to Lundbeck entering an agreement with the companies to delay their sales of generic citalopram after Lundbeck's patent on the drug had expired, thus reducing competition in breach of European antitrust law.

== See also ==
- List of antidepressants
