= Aminotetralin =

Aminotetralin may refer to:

- 1-Aminotetralin
- 2-Aminotetralin
