= Indatraline =

Chemical compound

Clinical data
- Other names: Lu 19-005
- Routes of administration: By mouth
- Drug class: Serotonin-norepinephrine-dopamine reuptake inhibitor; Antidepressant
- ATC code: none

Legal status
- Legal status: In general: uncontrolled

Identifiers
- IUPAC name: (1R,3S)-3-(3,4-dichlorophenyl)-N-methyl-2,3-dihydro-1H-inden-1-amine
- CAS Number: 86939-10-8
- PubChem CID: 126280
- ChemSpider: 16736639
- UNII: 4U40Y96J1Z
- ChEMBL: ChEMBL146332
- CompTox Dashboard (EPA): DTXSID4043981

Chemical and physical data
- Formula: C_{16}H_{15}Cl_{2}N
- Molar mass: 292.20 g·mol^{−1}
- 3D model (JSmol): Interactive image
- SMILES: Clc1ccc(cc1Cl)[C@@H]3C[C@H](NC)c2ccccc23
- InChI: InChI=1S/C16H15Cl2N/c1-19-16-9-13(11-4-2-3-5-12(11)16)10-6-7-14(17)15(18)8-10/h2-8,13,16,19H,9H2,1H3/t13-,16-/m0/s1; Key:SVFXPTLYMIXFRX-BBRMVZONSA-N

Indatraline (Lu 19-005) is an antidepressive agent and non-selective monoamine transporter inhibitor that blocks the reuptake of dopamine, norepinephrine, and serotonin with similar efficacy to cocaine. This compound may be used to treat cocaine addictions as its effects have a slower onset and a longer duration than those of cocaine. Indatraline has been shown to block the action of methamphetamine and MDMA in laboratory experiments.

== Methylation ==
Indatraline is N-alkylated at the amino group, making it possible to slow the onset of action, so that it is not until N-demethylation occurs that the molecules become active. N-methylindatraline has a longer duration than indatraline because norindatraline is inactive, whereas demethylating N-methylindatraline does not terminate the actions of the parent compound.

Effects of N-dimethylindatraline start about 20–30 minutes after administration; it takes a longer time for this chemical to absorb into the body than cocaine.

== Synthesis ==
Two main routes have been reported. The first route was reported by Bøgesø and co-workers.

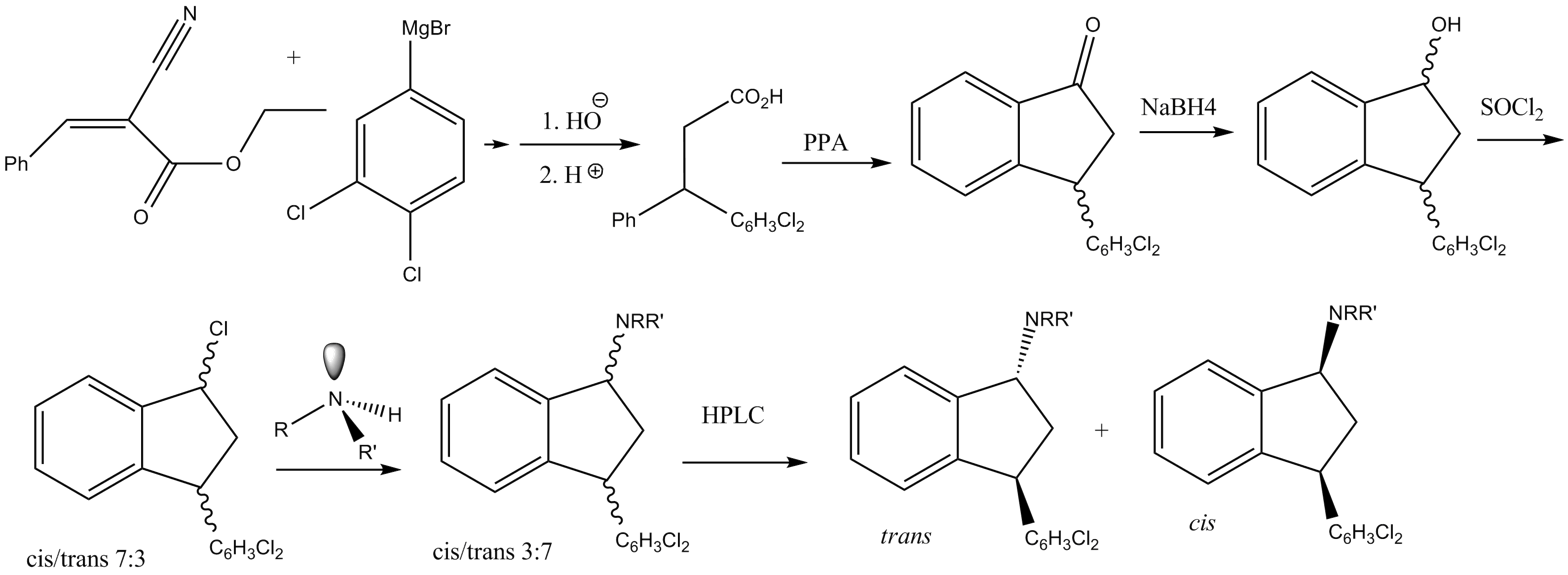

The other has been adapted to scale-up:

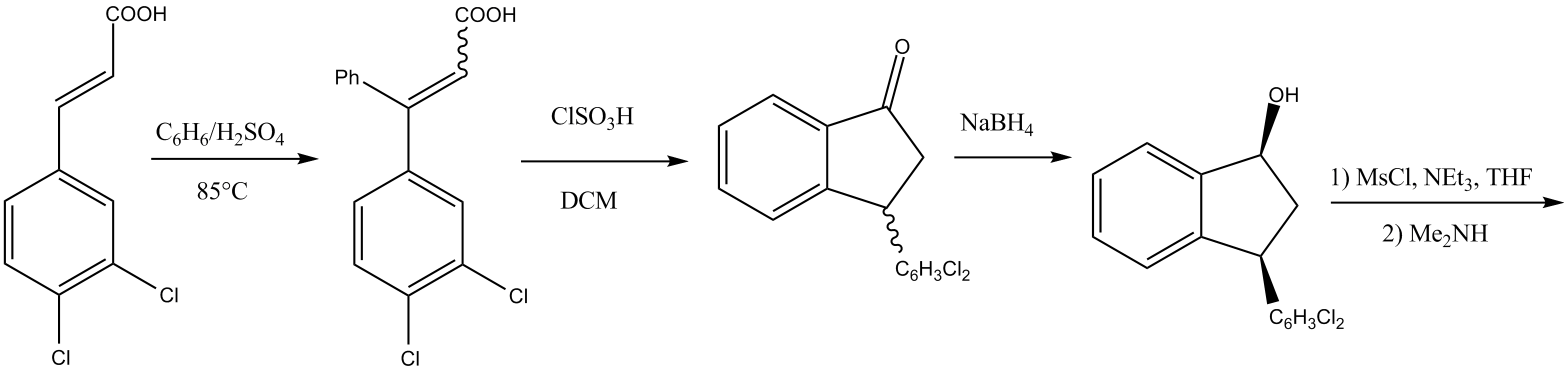

Another method involves the contraction of a dihydronaphthalene (6–6 fused system) to form the 6–5 indane skeleton.

Routes based on 1-indanone-type intermediates are not as simple as a direct reduction of an imine or oxime. The undesirable cis diastereomers are formed instead of the desirable trans isomers. This adds an extra step to the synthetic route. First, the ketones are reduced to mostly cis alcohols. Second, the cis alcohols are converted to the corresponding mesylates, conserving stereochemistry. Third, the mesylates can then be reacted, e.g. with, N-methylbenzylamine, causing a Walden inversion (SN2). Finally, the removal of the benzyl affords the product as a racemic mixture.

== See also ==
- Sertraline
- Tametraline
- Ibogamine
