= Tametraline =

Chemical compound

Clinical data
- Other names: CP-24,441
- ATC code: none

Identifiers
- IUPAC name: (1R,4S)-N-methyl-4-phenyl-1,2,3,4-tetrahydronaphthalen-1-amine
- CAS Number: 52795-02-5; HCl: 52760-47-1
- PubChem CID: 104180
- ChemSpider: 143316
- UNII: 440C8K5Y5K; HCl: 2FY1A2A305
- CompTox Dashboard (EPA): DTXSID90200774

Chemical and physical data
- Formula: C_{17}H_{19}N
- Molar mass: 237.346 g·mol^{−1}
- 3D model (JSmol): Interactive image
- SMILES: CN[C@H](CC1)C(C=CC=C2)=C2[C@H]1C3=CC=CC=C3
- InChI: InChI=1S/C17H19N/c1-18-17-12-11-14(13-7-3-2-4-8-13)15-9-5-6-10-16(15)17/h2-10,14,17-18H,11-12H2,1H3/t14-,17+/m0/s1; Key:NVXPZMLRGBVYQV-WMLDXEAASA-N

Tametraline (CP-24,441) is the parent of a series of chemical compounds investigated at Pfizer that eventually led to the development of sertraline.

Sertraline has been called "3,4-dichloro-tametraline". This is correct but it is an oversimplification in the sense that sertraline is the S,S-isomer whereas tametraline is the 1R,4S-stereoisomer.

1R-Methylamino-4S-phenyl-tetralin is a potent inhibitor of norepinephrine uptake in rat brain synaptosomes, reverses reserpine induced hypothermia in mice, and blocks uptake of ^{3}H-Norepinephrine into rat heart.

Tametraline is a norepinephrine–dopamine reuptake inhibitor.

Indatraline is an indanamine homolog of tetralin-based tametraline, although in the case of indatraline the product is pm-dichlorinated.

== See also ==
- Cyproheptadine
- Dasotraline
- Desmethylsertraline
- EXP-561 (1-amino-4-phenylbicyclo[2.2.2]octane)
- JNJ-7925476
- Lometraline
- Nefopam
- Sertraline
