= 5-MeO-EiPT =

Chemical compound

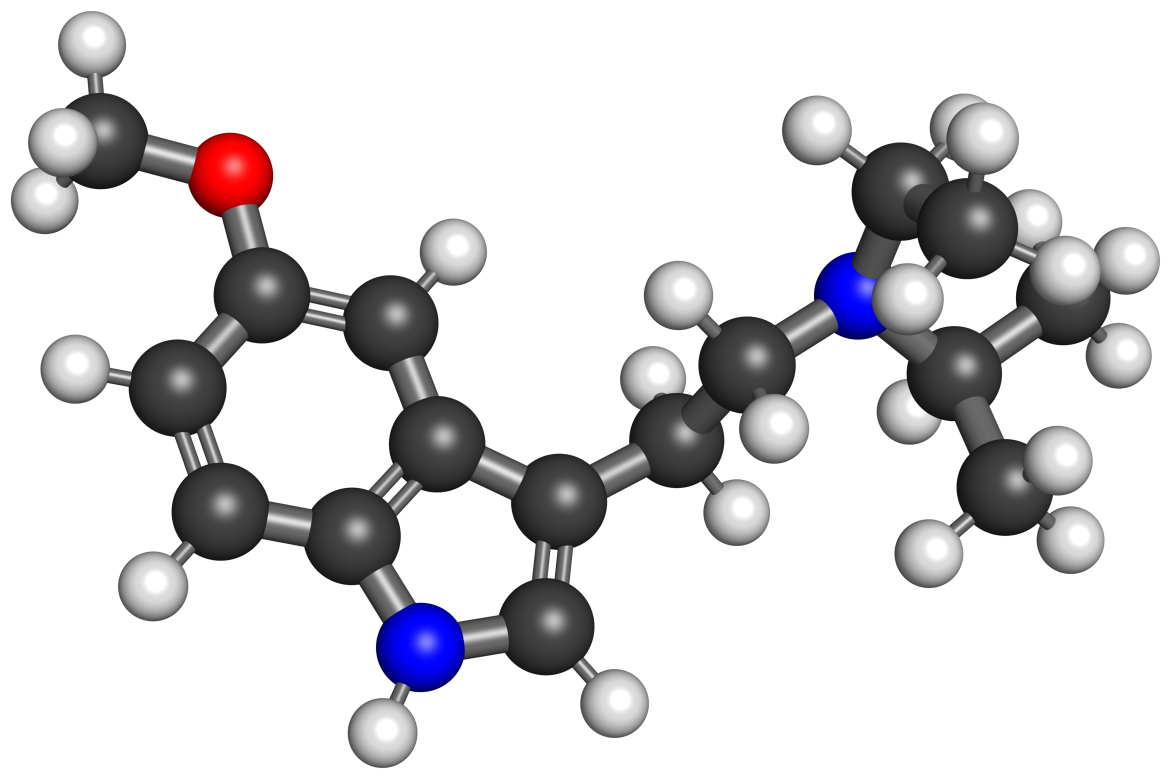

Clinical data
- Other names: 5-Methoxy-N-ethyl-N-isopropyltryptamine
- Drug class: Non-selective serotonin receptor agonist; Serotonin 5-HT_{2A} receptor agonist; Serotonergic psychedelic; Hallucinogen
- ATC code: None

Legal status
- Legal status: DE: NpSG (Industrial and scientific use only); UK: Class A

Identifiers
- IUPAC name: N-ethyl-5-methoxy-N-(1-methylethyl)-1H-indole-3-ethanamine
- CAS Number: 850032-66-5
- PubChem CID: 53485366
- ChemSpider: 30798626
- UNII: 5M8HT6UV7B
- CompTox Dashboard (EPA): DTXSID70704548

Chemical and physical data
- Formula: C_{16}H_{24}N_{2}O
- Molar mass: 260.381 g·mol^{−1}
- 3D model (JSmol): Interactive image
- SMILES: CC(C)N(CC)CCC1=CNC2=CC=C(OC)C=C21
- InChI: InChI=1S/C16H24N2O/c1-5-18(12(2)3)9-8-13-11-17-16-7-6-14(19-4)10-15(13)16/h6-7,10-12,17H,5,8-9H2,1-4H3; Key:VVEQXDHSGNBFLZ-UHFFFAOYSA-N

5-MeO-EiPT, also known as 5-methoxy-N-ethyl-N-isopropyltryptamine, is a psychedelic drug of the tryptamine family which has been sold online as a designer drug.

== Use and effects ==
5-MeO-EiPT was not included nor mentioned in Alexander Shulgin's book TiHKAL (Tryptamines I Have Known and Loved). When subsequently asked about 5-MeO-EiPT, Shulgin said that he never got around to making or exploring it and that its dose, duration, and effects were unknown. In any case, 5-MeO-EiPT has been used as a novel recreational designer drug.

== Pharmacology ==
=== Pharmacodynamics ===
5-MeO-EiPT acts as a potent full agonist of the serotonin 5-HT_{2A} receptor. It also shows high affinity for the serotonin 5-HT_{1A} receptor and interacts very weakly with the serotonin transporter (SERT). The drug produces the head-twitch response, a behavioral proxy of psychedelic effects, in rodents. However, it produces a rather weak head-twitch response, suggesting that it might have reduced hallucinogenic effects relative to other psychedelic tryptamines or might be non-hallucinogenic. The serotonin 5-HT_{1A} receptor antagonist WAY-100635 augmented the head-twitch response induced by 5-MeO-EiPT in rodents. The drug also produces hypothermia and hypolocomotion in rodents.

== Chemistry ==
=== Analogues ===
Analogues of 5-MeO-EiPT include ethylisopropyltryptamine (EiPT), 4-HO-EiPT (ethiprocin), 4-AcO-EiPT (ethipracetin), 5-MeO-DMT, 5-MeO-DET, 5-MeO-DPT, 5-MeO-DiPT, 5-MeO-DALT, 5-MeO-MET, 5-MeO-MPT, 5-MeO-MiPT, 5-MeO-MsBT, 5-MeO-EPT, 5-MeO-PiPT, and 5-MeO-iPALT (ASR-3001), among others.

== History ==
5-MeO-EiPT was first described by Alexander Shulgin by 2002.

== Society and culture ==
=== Legal status ===
5-MeO-EiPT is illegal in Japan. 5-MeO-EiPT is illegal in Italy. Sweden's public health agency suggested classifying 5-MeO-EiPT as a hazardous substance, on May 15, 2019.

== See also ==
- Substituted tryptamine
