= 4-HO-EPT =

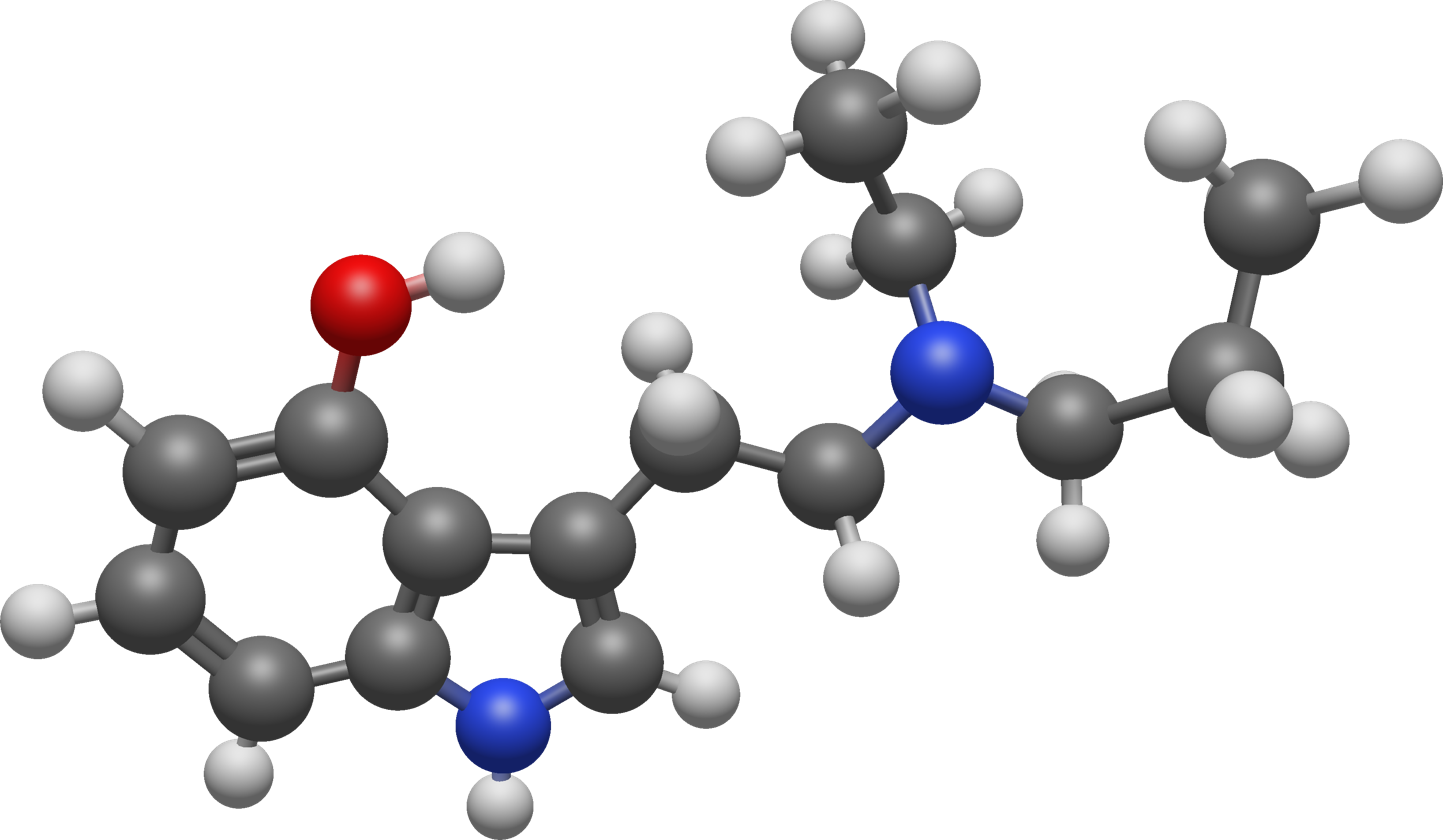

Clinical data
- Other names: 4-OH-EPT; 4-Hydroxy-N-ethyl-N-propyltryptamine; Eprocin
- Routes of administration: Oral
- Drug class: Non-selective serotonin receptor agonist; Serotonin 5-HT_{2A} receptor agonist; Serotonergic psychedelic; Hallucinogen
- ATC code: None

Identifiers
- IUPAC name: 3-{2-[ethyl(propyl)amino]ethyl}-1H-indol-4-ol
- CAS Number: 2595431-59-5
- PubChem CID: 138454310
- ChemSpider: 129433801
- UNII: Y3J8M5UX6G
- CompTox Dashboard (EPA): DTXSID801336292

Chemical and physical data
- Formula: C_{15}H_{22}N_{2}O
- Molar mass: 246.354 g·mol^{−1}
- 3D model (JSmol): Interactive image
- SMILES: CCCN(CC)CCC1=CNC2=CC=CC(O)=C12
- InChI: InChI=1S/C15H22N2O/c1-3-9-17(4-2)10-8-12-11-16-13-6-5-7-14(18)15(12)13/h5-7,11,16,18H,3-4,8-10H2,1-2H3; Key:JQELEPKHBXEAHR-UHFFFAOYSA-N

4-HO-EPT, also known as 4-hydroxy-N-ethyl-N-propyltryptamine or as eprocin, is a psychedelic drug of the tryptamine family, which is structurally related to psilocin (4-HO-DMT). It was encountered as a novel designer drug in Japan by 2021.

== Use and effects ==
4-HO-EPT was not included nor mentioned in Alexander Shulgin's book TiHKAL (Tryptamines I Have Known and Loved). Subsequently, however, an assumed prodrug of 4-HO-EPT, 4-AcO-EPT, has emerged as a novel designer drug, and has been said based on online anecdotal reports to have a dose of 20 to 30 mg orally.

== Pharmacology ==
=== Pharmacodynamics ===
4-HO-EPT activities
Target	Affinity (K_{i}, nM)
5-HT_{1A}	163
5-HT_{1B}	1,097
5-HT_{1D}	644
5-HT_{1E}	591
5-HT_{2A}	546 (K_{i}); 3.2 (EC_{50}); 100% (E_{max})
5-HT_{2B}	62 (K_{i}); 4.3 (EC_{50}); 89% (E_{max})
5-HT_{2C}	1,272 (K_{i}); 129 (EC_{50}); 89% (E_{max})
5-HT_{5A}	1,576
5-HT_{6}	284
5-HT_{7}	438
α_{2A}	2,073
α_{2B}, α_{2C}	>10,000
D_{2}	3,010
D_{3}	985
D_{4}, D_{5}	>10,000
H_{1}	406
H_{2}	>10,000
M_{4}	>10,000
σ_{1}	1,400
σ_{2}	1,773
KOR	>10,000
NR2B	5,947
SERT	1,257
DAT	>10,000
Notes: The smaller the value, the more avidly the drug interacts with the site. Sources:

4-HO-EPT is a potent full agonist of the serotonin 5-HT_{2A}, 5-HT_{2B}, and 5-HT_{2C} receptors. It has one to two orders of magnitude greater potency as a serotonin 5-HT_{2A} and 5-HT_{2B} receptor agonist than as a serotonin 5-HT_{2C} receptor agonist. The drug also shows affinity for other serotonin receptors, such as the serotonin 5-HT_{1A} and 5-HT_{6} receptors. 4-HO-EPT produces the head-twitch response, a behavioral proxy of psychedelic effects, in rodents.

=== Pharmacokinetics ===
The metabolism of 4-HO-EPT has been studied.

== Chemistry ==
=== Analogues ===
Analogues of 4-HO-EPT include ethylpropyltryptamine (EPT), 5-MeO-EPT, 5-fluoro-EPT, 4-HO-MPT, 4-HO-PiPT, 4-HO-DET, and 4-HO-DPT, among others.

== Society and culture ==
=== Legal status ===
==== Canada ====
4-HO-EPT is not a controlled substance in Canada as of 2025.

==== United Kingdom ====
4-HO-EPT is illegal in the United Kingdom as a result of the Psychoactive Substances Act of 2016.

==== United States ====
4-HO-EPT may be considered an analogue of psilocin, which is a Schedule I drug under the Controlled Substances Act. As such, the sale for human consumption would be illegal under the Federal Analogue Act.

== See also ==
- Substituted tryptamine
