= 4-HO-EiPT =

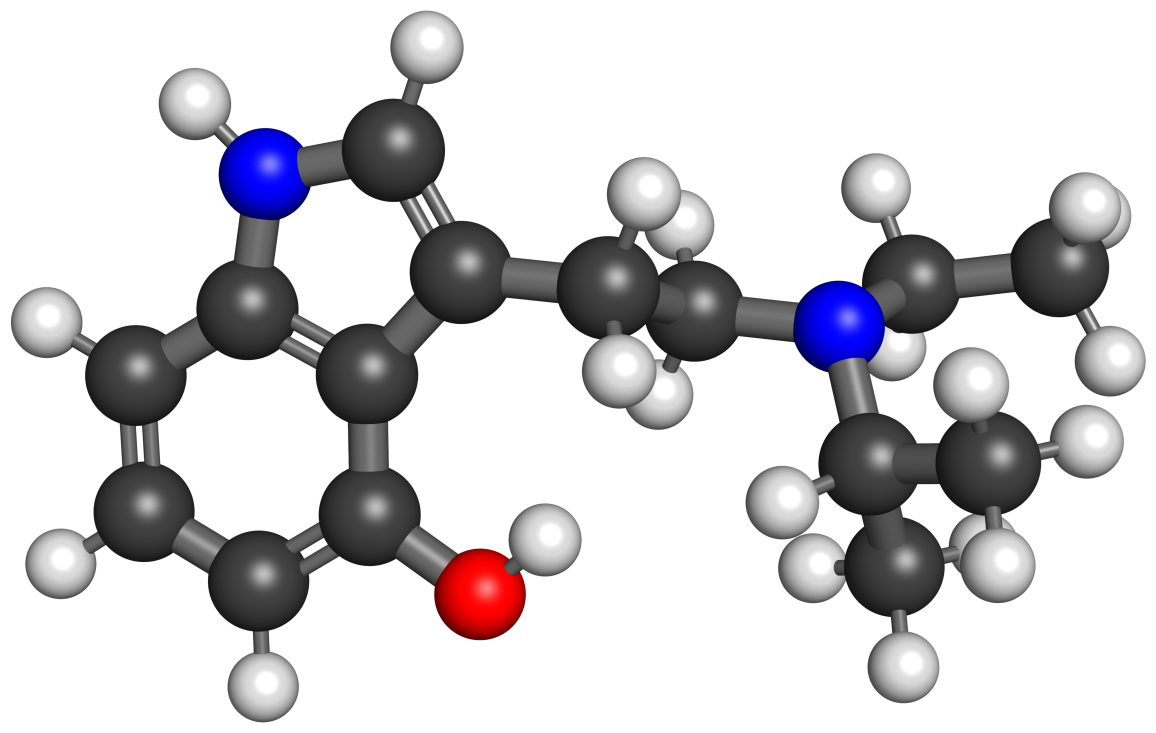

Clinical data
- Other names: 4-OH-EiPT; 4-Hydroxy-N-ethyl-N-isopropyltryptamine; Ethiprocin; Eiprocin
- ATC code: None

Identifiers
- IUPAC name: 3-[2-[ethyl(propan-2-yl)amino]ethyl]-1H-indol-4-ol
- PubChem CID: 156137203
- ChemSpider: 115285204

Chemical and physical data
- Formula: C_{15}H_{2}N_{2}O
- Molar mass: 226.194 g·mol^{−1}
- 3D model (JSmol): Interactive image
- SMILES: CCN(CCC1=CNC2=C1C(=CC=C2)O)C(C)C
- InChI: InChI=1S/C15H22N2O/c1-4-17(11(2)3)9-8-12-10-16-13-6-5-7-14(18)15(12)13/h5-7,10-11,16,18H,4,8-9H2,1-3H3; Key:ICODNLSOEJNDGB-UHFFFAOYSA-N

4-HO-EiPT, also known as 4-hydroxy-N-ethyl-N-isopropyltryptamine, is a little-known chemical compound of the tryptamine and 4-hydroxytryptamine families. It is closely related to known psychedelic tryptamines and designer drugs such as ethylisopropyltryptamine (EiPT) and 5-MeO-EiPT.

== Use and effects ==
4-HO-EiPT was not included nor mentioned in Alexander Shulgin's book TiHKAL (Tryptamines I Have Known and Loved).

== Chemistry ==
=== Analogues ===
Analogues of 4-HO-EiPT include ethylisopropyltryptamine (EiPT), 4-AcO-EiPT, 5-MeO-EiPT, 4-HO-MET, 4-HO-MPT, 4-HO-MiPT, 4-HO-PiPT, and 4-HO-DiPT, among others.

== See also ==
- Substituted tryptamine
