= 5-MeO-EPT =

Chemical compound

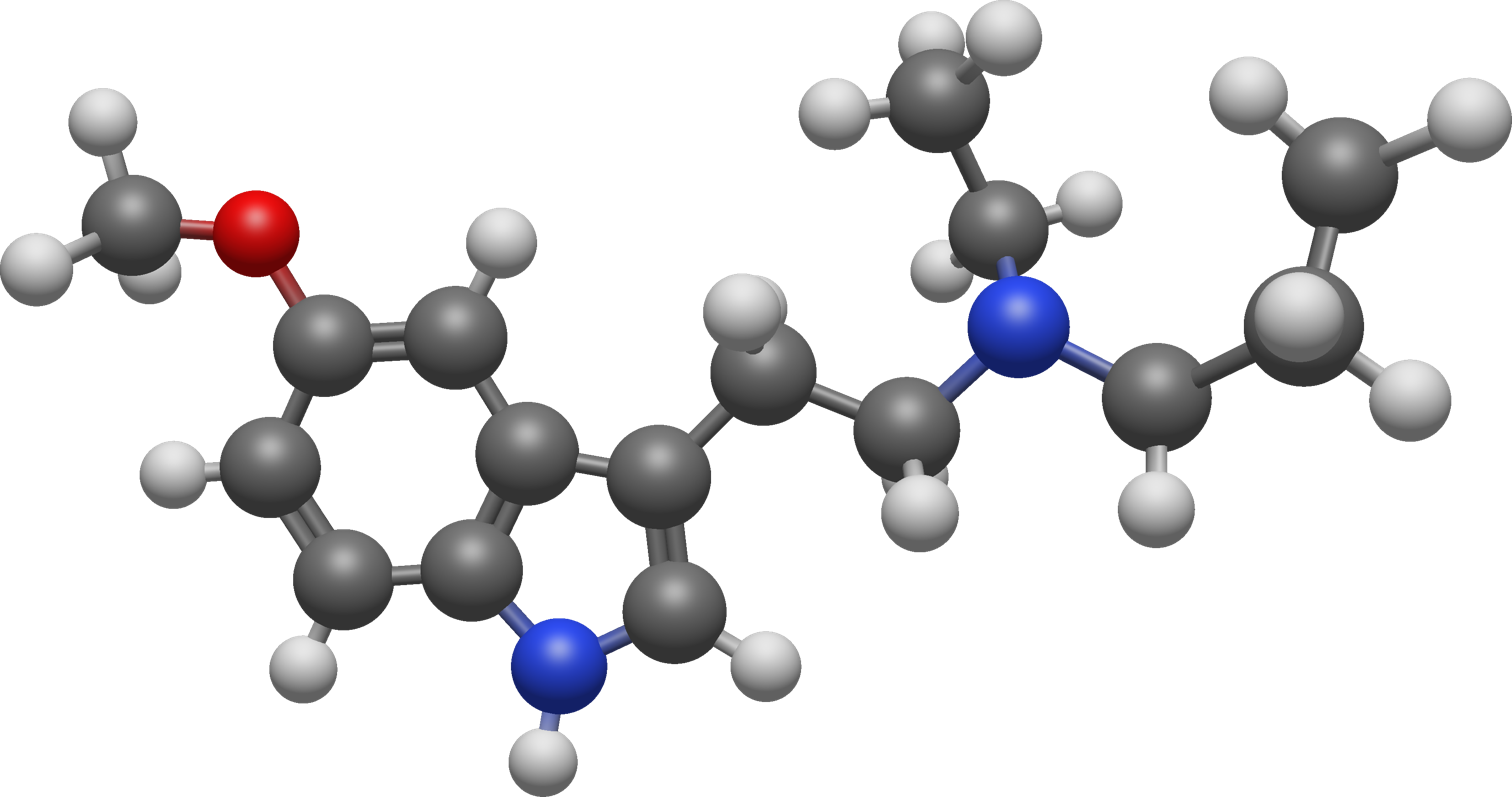

Clinical data
- Other names: 5-Methoxy-N-ethyl-N-propyltryptamine
- Drug class: Serotonergic psychedelic; Hallucinogen

Legal status
- Legal status: DE: NpSG (Industrial and scientific use only); UK: Class A; Illegal in Singapore and Japan

Identifiers
- IUPAC name: N-ethyl-N-[2-(5-methoxy-1H-indol-3-yl)ethyl]propan-1-amine
- CAS Number: 850032-67-6
- PubChem CID: 74405226
- ChemSpider: 52083392
- UNII: 138I4B27P7
- CompTox Dashboard (EPA): DTXSID201337404

Chemical and physical data
- Formula: C_{16}H_{24}N_{2}O
- Molar mass: 260.381 g·mol^{−1}
- 3D model (JSmol): Interactive image
- SMILES: CCCN(CC)CCC1=CNC2=C1C=C(C=C2)OC
- InChI: InChI=1S/C16H24N2O/c1-4-9-18(5-2)10-8-13-12-17-16-7-6-14(19-3)11-15(13)16/h6-7,11-12,17H,4-5,8-10H2,1-3H3; Key:OQHFIOKNGNJPPF-UHFFFAOYSA-N

5-MeO-EPT, also known as 5-methoxy-N-ethyl-N-propyltryptamine, is a psychedelic tryptamine derivative which has been sold as a designer drug.

== Use and effects ==
5-MeO-EPT was not included nor mentioned in Alexander Shulgin's book TiHKAL (Tryptamines I Have Known and Loved).

== Chemistry ==
=== Analogues ===
Analogues of 5-MeO-EPT include ethylpropyltryptamine (EPT), 4-HO-EPT (eprocin), 5-fluoro-EPT, 5-MeO-MET, 5-MeO-MPT, 5-MeO-MiPT, and 5-MeO-EiPT, among others.

== Society and culture ==
=== Legal status ===
5-MeO-EPT is illegal in Singapore and Japan, as well as falling within the scope of drug analogue laws in a number of other jurisdictions.

== See also ==
- Substituted tryptamine
