= 4-AcO-MET =

Chemical compound

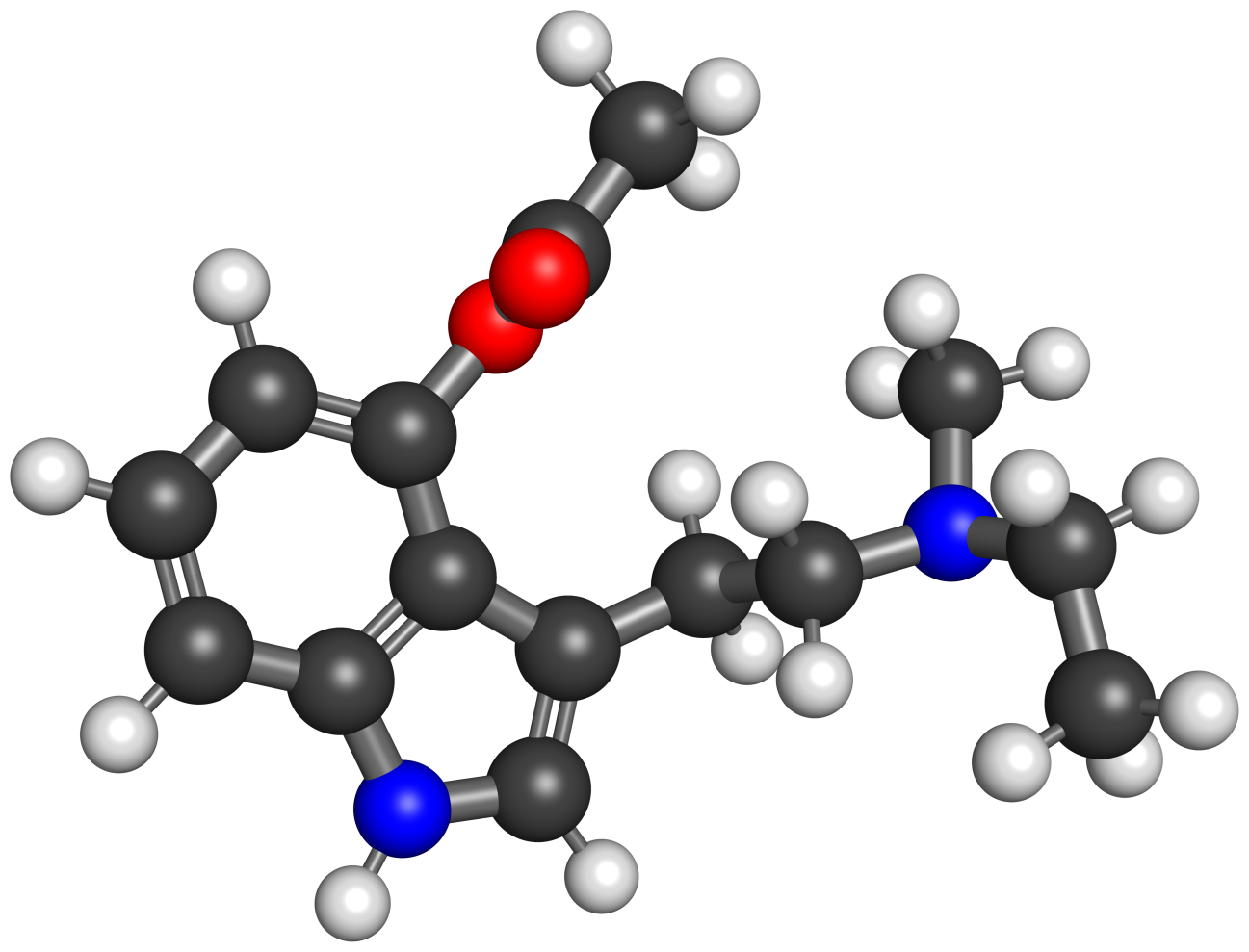

Clinical data
- Other names: 4-Acetoxy-MET; 4-Acetoxy-N-methyl-N-ethyltryptamine; Metacetin
- Routes of administration: Oral
- Drug class: Serotonergic psychedelic; Hallucinogen
- ATC code: None

Legal status
- Legal status: BR: Class F2 (Prohibited psychotropics)

Pharmacokinetic data
- Duration of action: 4–10 hours

Identifiers
- IUPAC name: [3-[2-[ethyl(methyl)amino]ethyl]-1H-indol-4-yl] acetate
- CAS Number: 1445751-40-5
- PubChem CID: 71308138
- ChemSpider: 26633897
- UNII: PCJ17NV1P0
- CompTox Dashboard (EPA): DTXSID301029955

Chemical and physical data
- Formula: C_{15}H_{20}N_{2}O_{2}
- Molar mass: 260.337 g·mol^{−1}
- 3D model (JSmol): Interactive image
- SMILES: CCN(C)CCc1c[nH]c2c1c(ccc2)OC(=O)C
- InChI: InChI=1S/C15H20N2O2/c1-4-17(3)9-8-12-10-16-13-6-5-7-14(15(12)13)19-11(2)18/h5-7,10,16H,4,8-9H2,1-3H3; Key:OMDKHOOGGJRLLX-UHFFFAOYSA-N

4-AcO-MET, also known as 4-acetoxy-N-methyl-N-ethyltryptamine or metacetin, is a psychedelic drug of the tryptamine family. It is the acetate ester of 4-HO-MET, and a homologue of 4-AcO-DMT. The drug is a novel compound with very little history of human use. It has been encountered as a novel designer drug.

== Use and effects ==
4-AcO-MET is thought to be a prodrug of 4-HO-MET. The dose of 4-AcO-MET is said to be 5 to 40 mg orally and its duration is said to be 4 to 10 hours. It is said to produce psilocin (4-HO-DMT)-like psychedelic effects.

== Pharmacology ==
=== Pharmacodynamics ===
Due to its similarity to the psilocin prodrug 4-AcO-DMT, which is deacetylated to form psilocin in vivo, it is expected that 4-AcO-MET is also quickly hydrolyzed into 4-HO-MET by serum esterases, but human studies concerning the metabolic fate of this drug are lacking.

The pharmacology of 4-AcO-MET has been studied.

== Chemistry ==
=== Analogues ===
Analogues of 4-AcO-MET include methylethyltryptamine (MET), 4-HO-MET (metocin), 5-MeO-MET, 4-AcO-DMT (psilacetin), 4-AcO-DET (ethacetin), 4-AcO-MPT, and 4-PrO-MET, among others.

== History ==
4-AcO-MET was encountered as a novel designer drug in Europe in 2009.

== Society and culture ==
=== Legal status ===
==== Canada ====
4-AcO-MET is not a controlled substance in Canada as of 2025.

==== Switzerland ====
In Switzerland, 4-AcO-MET is a controlled substance under Verzeichnis E.

==== United Kingdom ====
In the United Kingdom, 4-AcO-MET is a Class A drug in the United Kingdom because it is an ester of the drug 4-HO-MET, which is a Class A drug under the tryptamine catch-all clause.

==== United States ====
In the United States, 4-AcO-MET is not scheduled. It may be considered an analogue of psilocin, a Schedule I drug under the Controlled Substances Act. As such, the sale for human consumption or the use for illicit non-medical purposes could be considered a crime under the Federal Analogue Act.

== See also ==
- Substituted tryptamine
