= Methylpropyltryptamine =

Psychedelic drug

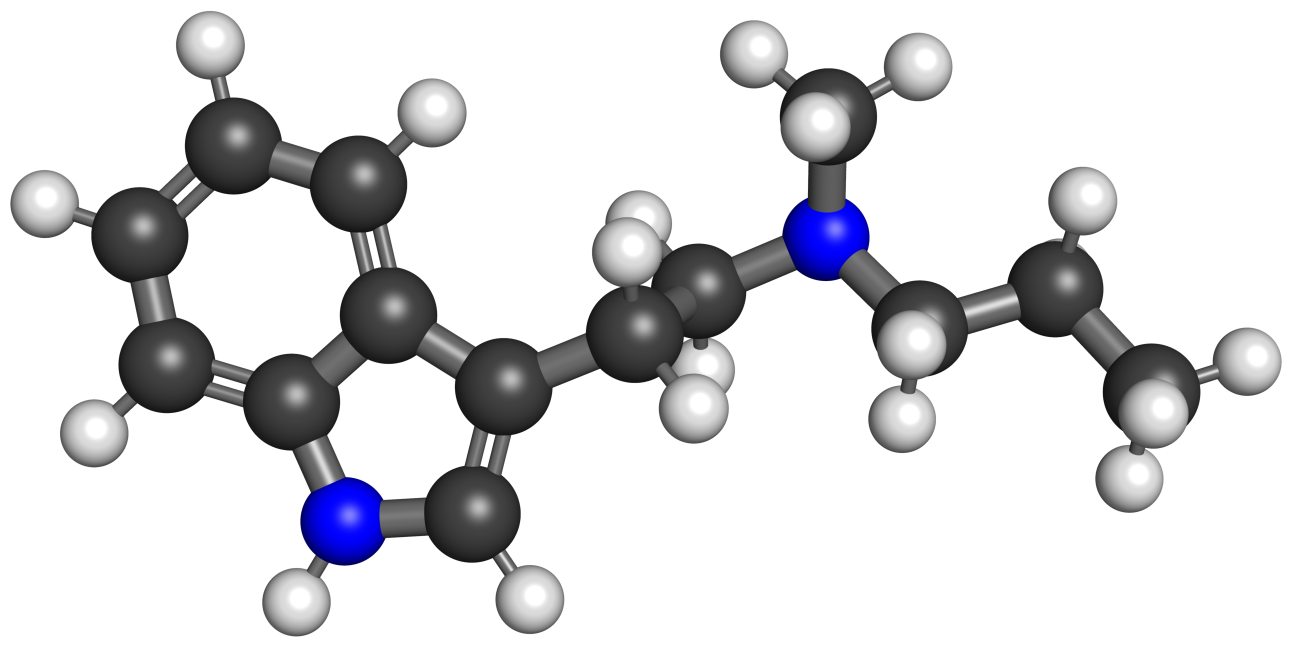

Clinical data
- Other names: MPT; N-Methyl-N-propyltryptamine
- Routes of administration: Oral
- Drug class: Serotonergic psychedelic; Hallucinogen
- ATC code: None

Identifiers
- IUPAC name: N-[2-(1H-indol-3-yl)ethyl]-N-methylpropan-1-amine
- CAS Number: 850032-72-3
- PubChem CID: 74405270
- ChemSpider: 96351249
- UNII: CWD3LY2N3Z

Chemical and physical data
- Formula: C_{14}H_{20}N_{2}
- Molar mass: 216.328 g·mol^{−1}
- 3D model (JSmol): Interactive image
- SMILES: CCCN(C)CCC1=CNC2=C1C=CC=C2
- InChI: InChI=1S/C14H20N2/c1-3-9-16(2)10-8-12-11-15-14-7-5-4-6-13(12)14/h4-7,11,15H,3,8-10H2,1-2H3; Key:SZUNESAKJQIJAC-UHFFFAOYSA-N

Methylpropyltryptamine (MPT), also known as N-methyl-N-propyltryptamine, is a psychedelic drug of the tryptamine family. It is a homologue of methylethyltryptamine (MET).

== Use and effects ==
In his book TiHKAL (Tryptamines I Have Known and Loved), Alexander Shulgin described MPT's effects as being unknown and its dose as being greater than 50 mg orally.

== Chemistry ==
=== Detection ===
An analytical method for MPT's detection has been reported.

=== Crystal structure ===
In 2019, Chadeayne et al. published the crystal structure of MPT. The authors describe the structure as "...a single molecule in the asymmetric unit, with an indole group that demonstrates a mean deviation from planarity of 0.015 A°."

=== Analogues ===
Analogues of MPT include 4-HO-MPT, 5-MeO-MPT, methylethyltryptamine (MET), ethylpropyltryptamine (EPT), ethylisopropyltryptamine (EiPT), and dipropyltryptamine (DPT), among others.

== Society and culture ==
=== Legal status ===
==== Canada ====
MPT is not a controlled substance in Canada as of 2025.

==== United States ====
MPT is not an explicitly controlled substance in the United States. However, it is an isomer of diethyltryptamine (DET), which is a schedule I controlled substance in this country, and so may be considered a controlled substance in the United States similarly.

== See also ==
- Substituted tryptamine
