= C14H19FN2 =

The molecular formula C_{14}H_{19}FN_{2} may refer to:

- 5-Fluoro-DET
- 6-Fluoro-DET
