= 4-AcO-DET =

Chemical compound

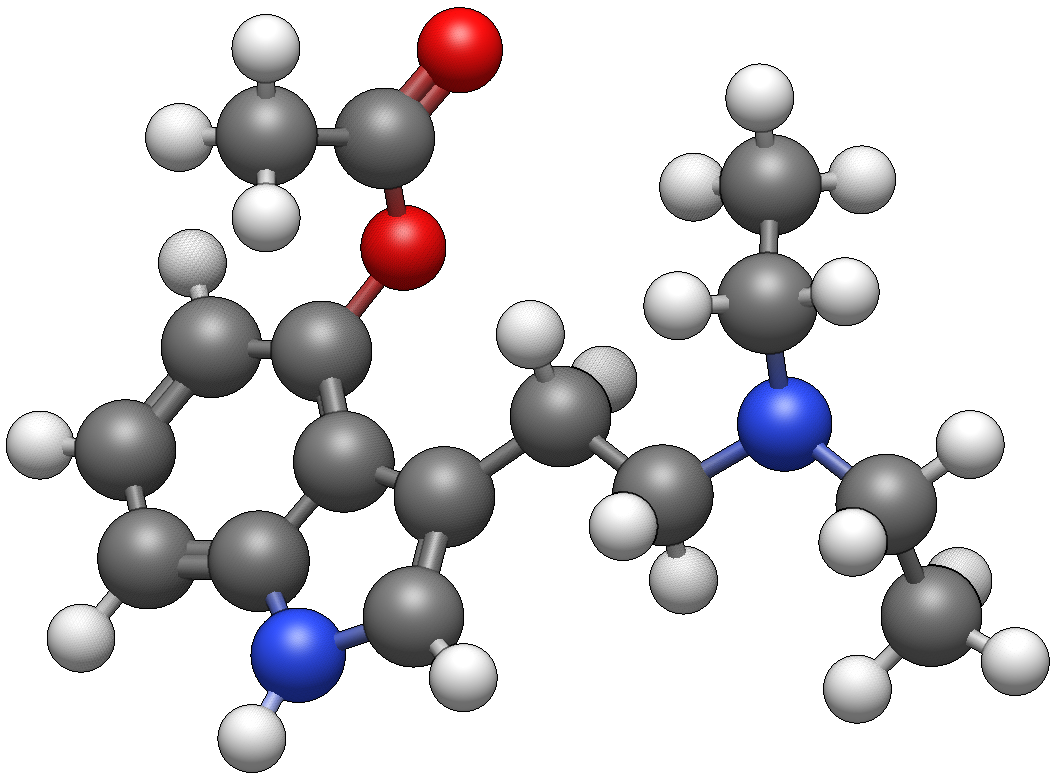

Clinical data
- Other names: 4-Acetoxy-DET; 4-Acetoxy-N,N-diethyltryptamine; Ethacetin; Ethylacybin
- Routes of administration: Oral
- Drug class: Serotonergic psychedelic; Hallucinogen
- ATC code: None

Legal status
- Legal status: DE: NpSG (Industrial and scientific use only); UK: Class A

Pharmacokinetic data
- Duration of action: 3–6 hours

Identifiers
- IUPAC name: 3-(2-diethylaminoethyl)-1H-indol-4-yl acetate
- CAS Number: 1135424-15-5
- PubChem CID: 24801867
- ChemSpider: 21106239
- UNII: 43U8799479
- CompTox Dashboard (EPA): DTXSID60647359

Chemical and physical data
- Formula: C_{16}H_{22}N_{2}O_{2}
- Molar mass: 274.364 g·mol^{−1}
- 3D model (JSmol): Interactive image
- SMILES: CC(OC1=CC=CC2=C1C(CCN(CC)CC)=CN2)=O
- InChI: InChI=1S/C16H22N2O2/c1-4-18(5-2)10-9-13-11-17-14-7-6-8-15(16(13)14)20-12(3)19/h6-8,11,17H,4-5,9-10H2,1-3H3; Key:ODVLAYUXIAMBFN-UHFFFAOYSA-N

4-AcO-DET, also known as 4-acetoxy-N,N-diethyltryptamine as well as ethacetin or ethylacybin, is a psychedelic tryptamine.

== Use and effects ==
4-AcO-DET is orally active, and doses of 10 to 25 mg are common. Effects last 3 to 6 hours. The free base is also active when smoked in a dose range of 5 to 20 mg. Smoking 4-AcO-DET greatly speeds up the onset; peak effects are experienced within 10 minutes, and are usually over within 1 hour.

== Pharmacology ==
It is expected that 4-AcO-DET is quickly hydrolyzed into the free phenolic 4-HO-DET by serum esterases, but human studies concerning the metabolic fate of this drug are lacking.

== Chemistry ==
4-AcO-DET is said to be more chemically stable than 4-HO-DET.

=== Analogues ===
Analogues of 4-AcO-DET include diethyltryptamine (DET), 4-HO-DET (ethocin), ethocybin (4-PO-DET), 4-AcO-DMT (psilacetin), 4-AcO-DPT, 4-AcO-MET, and 4-AcO-MPT, among others.

== History ==
4-AcO-DET was first synthesized by Albert Hofmann and Franz Troxler at Sandoz in 1958.

== Society and culture ==
=== Legal status ===
==== Canada ====
4-AcO-DET is not an explicitly nor implicitly controlled substance in Canada as of 2025.

==== Finland ====
Listed in the "government decree on psychoactive substances banned from the consumer market".

==== Sweden ====
Sveriges riksdags health ministry Statens folkhälsoinstitut classified 4-AcO-DET as "health hazard" under the act Lagen om förbud mot vissa hälsofarliga varor (translated Act on the Prohibition of Certain Goods Dangerous to Health) as of Nov 1, 2005, in their regulation SFS 2005:733 listed as 4-acetoxi-N,N-dietyltryptamin (4-AcO-DET), making it illegal to sell or possess.

==== United States ====
4-AcO-DET is not an explicitly controlled substance in the United States. However, it could be considered a controlled substance under the Federal Analogue Act if intended for human consumption.

=== In consumer products ===
In December of 2025 the California department of public health issued a warning that products being sold as Magic Mushroom gummies chocolate bars and syrups contained 4-Aco-DET alongside 4-Aco-DMT. They advised against consuming these products stating they may cause "severe illness, hospitalization, or even death". Severe adverse reactions such as extreme anxiety and vomiting have been reported from consumer products containing 4-Aco-DET from a variety of different brands.

== See also ==
- Substituted tryptamine
