= Bretisilocin =

Chemical compound

- Molecular structure of 5-fluoro-MET (bretisilocin)

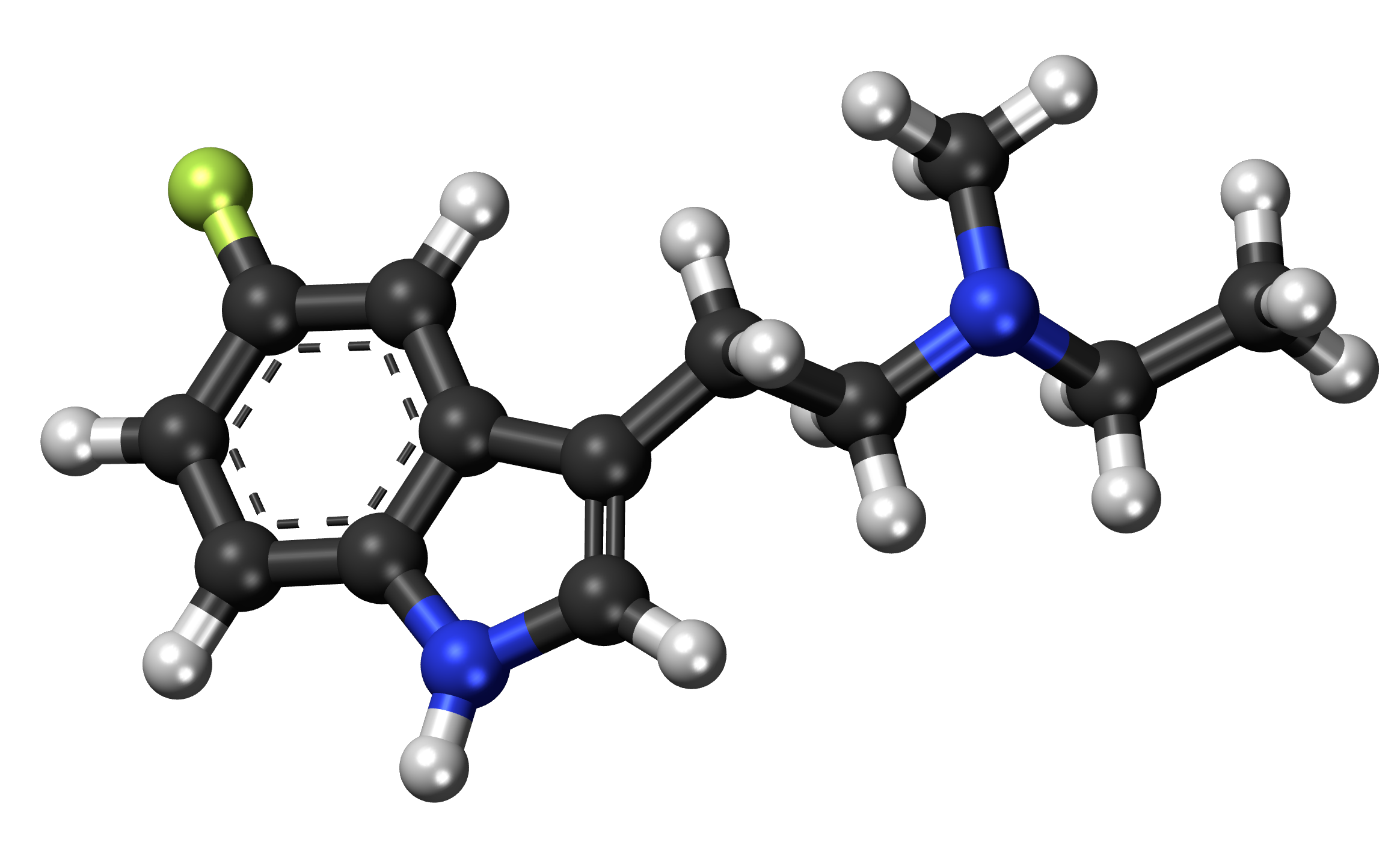
- 3D representation of a 5-fluoro-MET (bretisilocin) molecule

Clinical data
- Other names: GM-2505; GM2505; 5-Fluoro-N-methyl-N-ethyltryptamine; 5F-MET; 5-F-MET; 5-Fluoro-MET
- Routes of administration: Intravenous, intranasal
- Drug class: Serotonergic psychedelic; Hallucinogen; Serotonin 5-HT_{2A} and 5-HT_{2C} receptor agonist; Serotonin 5-HT_{2B} receptor partial agonist or antagonist; Serotonin releasing agent

Legal status
- Legal status: Investigational

Pharmacokinetic data
- Onset of action: IV: 10–20 minutes (peak)
- Elimination half-life: 45 (40–50) minutes
- Duration of action: IV: 60–90 minutes

Identifiers
- IUPAC name: N-ethyl-2-(5-fluoro-1H-indol-3-yl)-N-methylethanamine
- CAS Number: 2698331-35-8
- PubChem CID: 156836209
- ChemSpider: 129221851
- UNII: DS425RQ8SX
- ChEMBL: ChEMBL5028766

Chemical and physical data
- Formula: C_{13}H_{17}FN_{2}
- Molar mass: 220.291 g·mol^{−1}
- 3D model (JSmol): Interactive image
- SMILES: CCN(C)CCC1=CNC2=C1C=C(C=C2)F
- InChI: InChI=1S/C13H17FN2/c1-3-16(2)7-6-10-9-15-13-5-4-11(14)8-12(10)13/h4-5,8-9,15H,3,6-7H2,1-2H3; Key:XRWQULAXCLVBPP-UHFFFAOYSA-N

Bretisilocin, also known by its developmental code name GM-2505 and as 5-fluoro-N-methyl-N-ethyltryptamine (5F-MET or 5-fluoro-MET), is a serotonergic psychedelic of the tryptamine family which is under development for the treatment of major depressive disorder. It is an analogue of dimethyltryptamine (DMT) and is the 5-fluorinated derivative of methylethyltryptamine (MET). Bretisilocin's route of administration is intravenous infusion.

The drug acts as a potent and well-balanced serotonin 5-HT_{2A} and 5-HT_{2C} receptor agonist, serotonin 5-HT_{2B} receptor partial agonist or antagonist, and serotonin releasing agent. It produces psychedelic-like effects in animals and similarly produces robust hallucinogenic effects in humans. The duration of bretisilocin is 60 to 90 minutes and is intermediate between the durations of DMT and psilocybin. It has been regarded by its developer as an "improved version of DMT".

Bretisilocin was patented by Andrew Kruegel and Gilgamesh Pharmaceuticals in 2021. It was originally developed by Gilgamesh Pharmaceuticals and is now under development by AbbVie. As of October 2026, the drug is in phase 2 clinical trials for the treatment of major depressive disorder. Bretisilocin was acquired from Gilgamesh Pharmaceuticals by AbbVie in a deal worth up to $1.2 billion in August 2025. It was encountered as a novel recreational designer drug in 2026.

== Use and effects ==
Bretisilocin, given by intravenous injection, produces threshold psychedelic effects at doses of 1 mg and 3.3 mg, has an optimal dose range of 10 to 15 mg, and produces particularly intense effects at a dose of 20 mg. The drug's effects at doses of 15 to 20 mg intravenously were described as equivalent to or greater than those of 30 mg psilocybin orally or 100 to 200 μg LSD orally based on hallucinogen rating scales. The 20 mg dose of bretisilocin was associated with more challenging experiences including anxiety, cognitive impairment, and dread of ego dissolution, which led to selection of a lower optimal dose range of 10 to 15 mg intravenously. Compared to other psychedelics like psilocybin and LSD, bretisilocin has a much shorter duration, but is longer-lasting than dimethyltryptamine (DMT). Its duration is about 60 to 90 minutes, whereas psilocybin has a duration of multiple hours and DMT has a duration of as short as 10 minutes. The psychedelic effects of bretisilocin are generally resolved by approximately 2 hours after administration, but have been found to last up to 4 to 6 hours in some individuals. Peak effects occur about 10 to 20 minutes following injection.

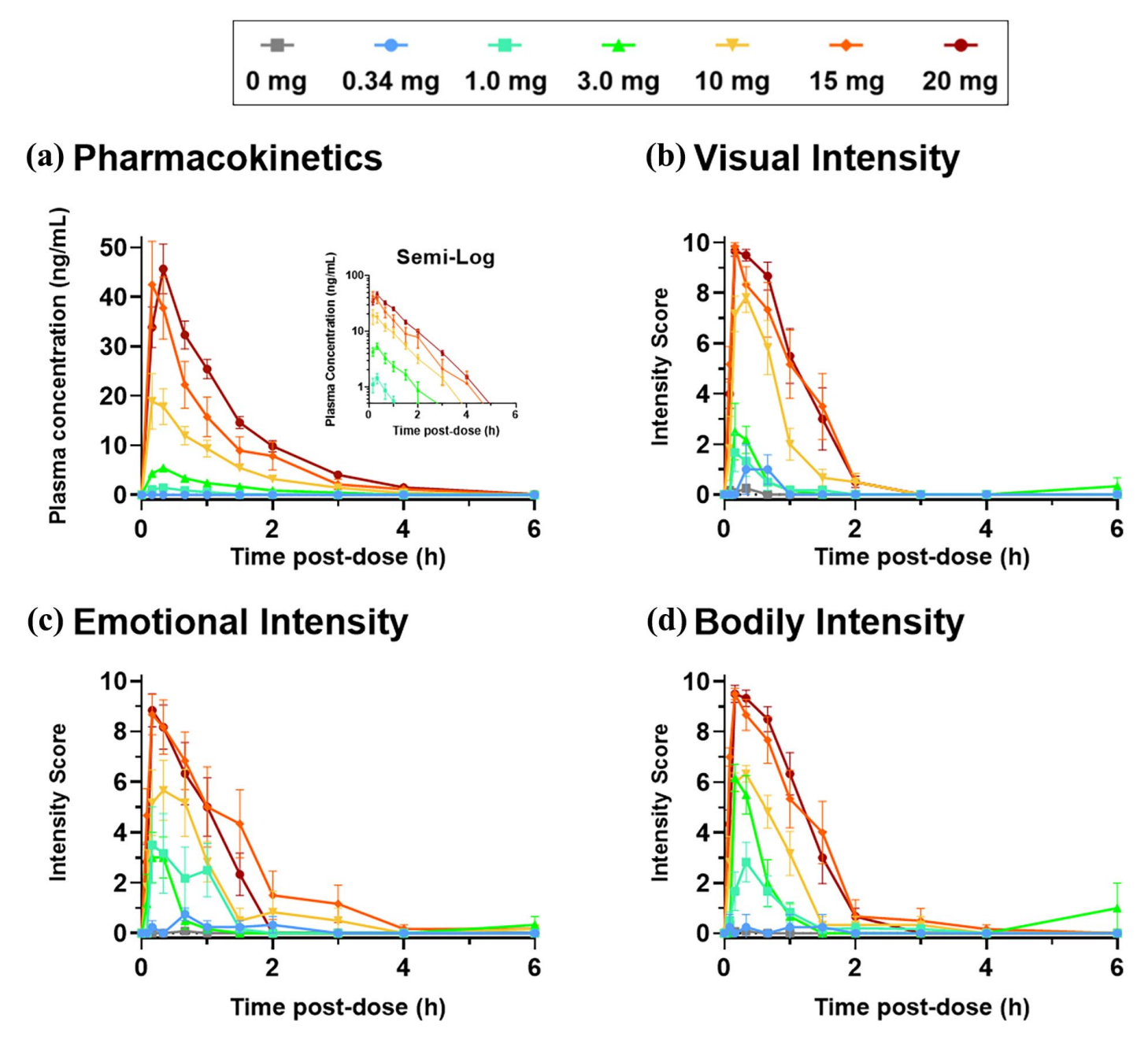
Circulating levels and psychedelic subjective effects of bretisilocin at doses of 0.34 to 20 mg by intravenous injection.

The drug, administered intravenously in clinical studies, produces effects in humans including "altered states of consciousness, altered visual depth perception, abnormal thinking, euphoric mood, feeling drunk, feeling of body temperature changes, relaxation, sensory processing disorder (including intense visual effects with color changes), sensory overload, and time perception altered". The subjective effects of bretisilocin were described as very robust and consistent in strength with the effects of other psychedelics including LSD, DMT, and psilocybin as have been reported in clinical studies. In addition to intravenous administration, bretisilocin has been anecdotally reported by recreational users to be active intranasally.

== Side effects ==
Side effects of bretisilocin include acute sensory processing disorder, altered state of consciousness, abnormal thinking, euphoric mood, fatigue, and small increases in heart rate and blood pressure, among others. Adverse effects like fatigue and headache occur after the psychedelic experience and can persist for up to 24 hours after administration.

== Pharmacology ==
=== Pharmacodynamics ===
Bretisilocin acts as a potent and well-balanced serotonin 5-HT_{2A} and 5-HT_{2C} receptor agonist, serotonin 5-HT_{2B} receptor antagonist, and serotonin releasing agent. In another study however, it was a moderate-efficacy partial agonist of the serotonin 5-HT_{2B} receptor (22.5% Emax). The drug appears to have negligible activity as a serotonin 5-HT_{1A} receptor agonist. However, another study found that it was a serotonin 5-HT_{1A} receptor full agonist, with an EC_{50} at this receptor that was about 44-fold less potent than at the serotonin 5-HT_{2A} receptor.

The affinity (K_{i}) of bretisilocin for the serotonin 5-HT_{2A} receptor was 4.9 nM with DOI as the radioligand and 140–191 nM with ketanserin as the radioligand. Its EC_{50} (E_{max}) values were 15.0–20.6 nM (80.6–87.6%) at the serotonin 5-HT_{2A} receptor and 9.5 nM (85.1%) at the serotonin 5-HT_{2C} receptor, whereas its IC_{50} at the serotonin 5-HT_{2B} receptor was 5.8 nM. It showed much higher efficacy at the serotonin 5-HT_{2A} receptor than its parent compound MET (E_{max} = 87.6% vs. 36.2%, respectively). Bretisilocin showed very weak activity at the serotonin 5-HT_{1A} receptor (EC_{50} = 16,918 nM, E_{max} = 83.0%). In addition to its actions at the serotonin 5-HT_{2} receptors, it is a partial serotonin releasing agent in rat brain synaptosomes, with an EC_{50} of 8.4–15.7 nM and an E_{max} of 66.8–71.4%. Bretisilocin is also a serotonin reuptake inhibitor to a much weaker extent (IC_{50} = 418.9 nM). Additional values have also been published.

Bretisilocin is related to DMT and is considered by its developer to be an "improved version of DMT". It also induces more serotonin release than DMT, which may provide it with more entactogen-like qualities compared to DMT. Bretisilocin produces the head-twitch response, a behavioral proxy of psychedelic effects, in rodents. It shows antidepressant-like effects in rodents. The drug dose-dependently produces hypolocomotion in rodents similarly to many other serotonergic psychedelics. Likewise, it produces anti-obsessional effects in the form of reduced marble burying in rodents. Bretisilocin does not produce conditioned place preference (CPP) in rodents, suggesting lack of reinforcing properties.

=== Pharmacokinetics ===
The pharmacokinetics of bretisilocin have been studied. The time to peak concentrations with intravenous injection is 10 to 20 minutes. Its elimination half-life is approximately 45 minutes (range 40 to 50 minutes).

== Chemistry ==
Bretisilocin, also known as 5-fluoro-N-methyl-N-ethyltryptamine, is a substituted tryptamine derivative. It is a derivative of dimethyltryptamine (DMT) and methylethyltryptamine (MET) as well as of 5-fluorotryptamine (5-FT).

=== Synthesis ===
The chemical synthesis of bretisilocin has been described.

=== Analogues ===
Some analogues of bretisilocin include 5-fluoro-DMT, 5-fluoro-DET, 5-fluoro-EPT, 5-chloro-DMT, 5-bromo-DMT, 5-fluoro-AMT, 5-fluoro-AET, 5-MeO-MET, and 7-F-5-MeO-MET, among others.

== History ==
Bretisilocin was first described in the literature in 2021. It was patented by Andrew Kruegel at Gilgamesh Pharmaceuticals. The drug was encountered as a novel recreational designer drug in March 2026.

== Society and culture ==
=== Names ===
Bretisilocin is the generic name of the drug and its INN. It is also known by its developmental code name GM-2505.

=== Legal status ===
==== Canada ====
Bretisilocin is not a controlled substance in Canada as of 2025.

==== United States ====
Bretislocin is not an explicitly controlled substance in the United States. However, it could be considered a controlled substance under the Federal Analogue Act if intended for human consumption.

== Research ==
Bretisilocin is under development as a potential pharmaceutical drug by AbbVie. As of October 2026, it is in phase 2 clinical trials for the treatment of major depressive disorder. A phase 2a trial of bretisilocin for major depressive disorder has been completed and the efficacy and safety data for the trial have been released. The drug was originally developed by Gilgamesh Pharmaceuticals and was acquired by AbbVie in a deal worth up to $1.2 billion in August 2025. Bretisilocin entered European Medicines Agency's priority medicines (PRIME) scheme for major depressive disorder in March 2026.

== See also ==
- Substituted tryptamine
- List of investigational hallucinogens and entactogens
- List of investigational antidepressants
- Luvesilocin (RE104; FT-104; 4-GO-DiPT)
