= 7-F-5-MeO-MET =

Chemical compound

5-MeO-7-F-MET

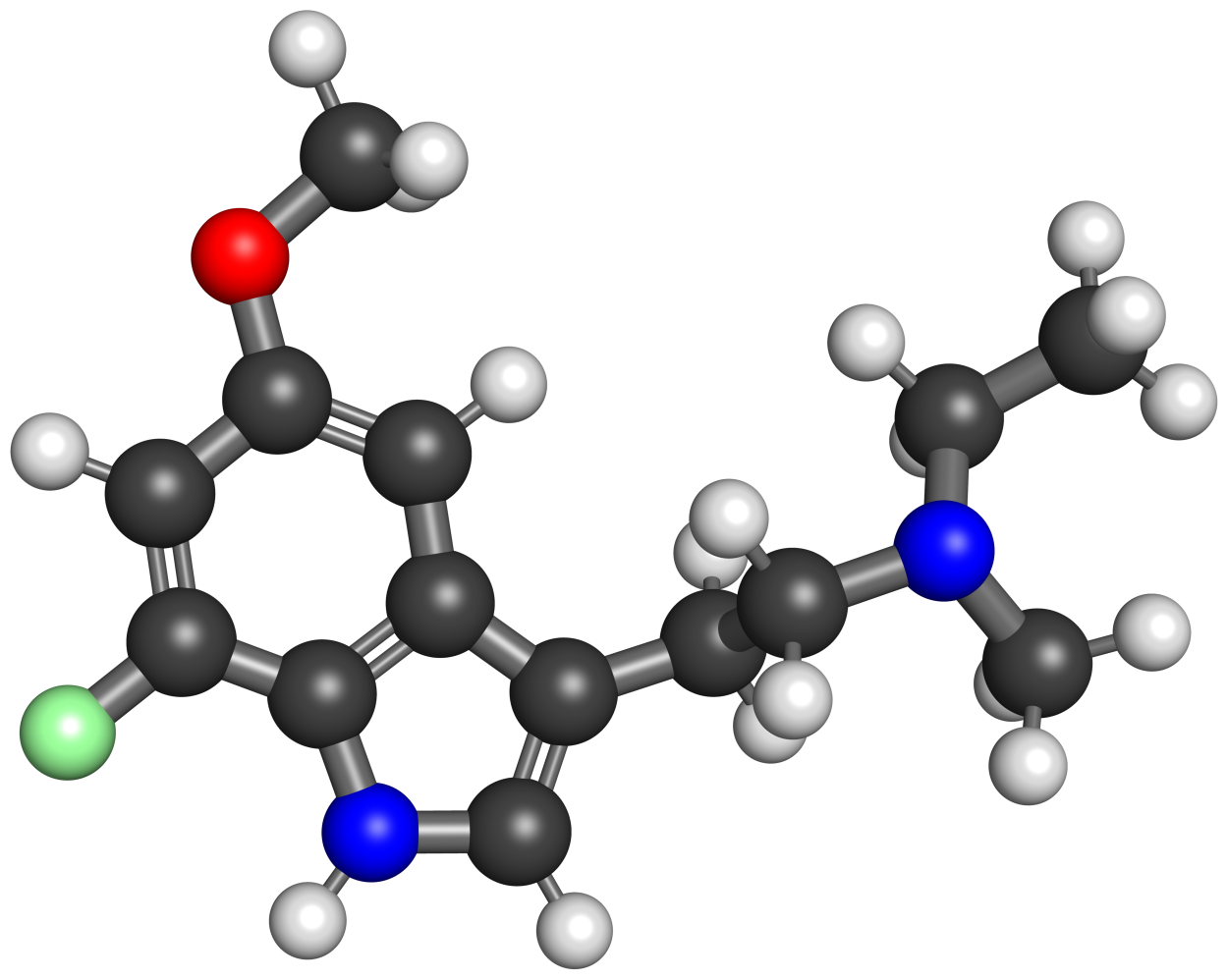

Identifiers
- IUPAC name: N-ethyl-2-(7-fluoro-5-methoxy-1H-indol-3-yl)-N-methylethanamine
- CAS Number: 2880993-15-5
- PubChem CID: 166157921
- UNII: 5X5MXX7RUF

Chemical and physical data
- Formula: C_{14}H_{19}FN_{2}O
- Molar mass: 250.317 g·mol^{−1}
- 3D model (JSmol): Interactive image
- SMILES: CCN(C)CCC1=CNC2=C1C=C(C=C2F)OC
- InChI: InChI=1S/C14H19FN2O/c1-4-17(2)6-5-10-9-16-14-12(10)7-11(18-3)8-13(14)15/h7-9,16H,4-6H2,1-3H3; Key:IKYKXFMGTKYLAU-UHFFFAOYSA-N

7-F-5-MeO-MET (5-MeO-7-F-MET, 5-Methoxy-7-fluoro-N-methyl-N-ethyltryptamine) is a tryptamine derivative which acts as a serotonin receptor agonist selective for the 5-HT_{2} subtypes, with a pEC_{50} of 8.71 at 5-HT_{2A}, vs 8.25 at 5-HT_{2B} and 7.69 at 5-HT_{2C}. In animal tests it produced the most potent head-twitch response of a range of related fluorinated tryptamine derivatives tested, though still with slightly lower potency than psilocybin.

== See also ==
- Substituted tryptamine
- 7-Fluorotryptamine
- 7-Chloro-AMT
- 5-Fluoro-MET
- 4-Fluoro-5-methoxy-DMT
- 5-MeO-MET
- Methylethyltryptamine (MET)
- 5-MeO-7-TMT
- O-4310
