= Ethocybin =

Psychedelic drug

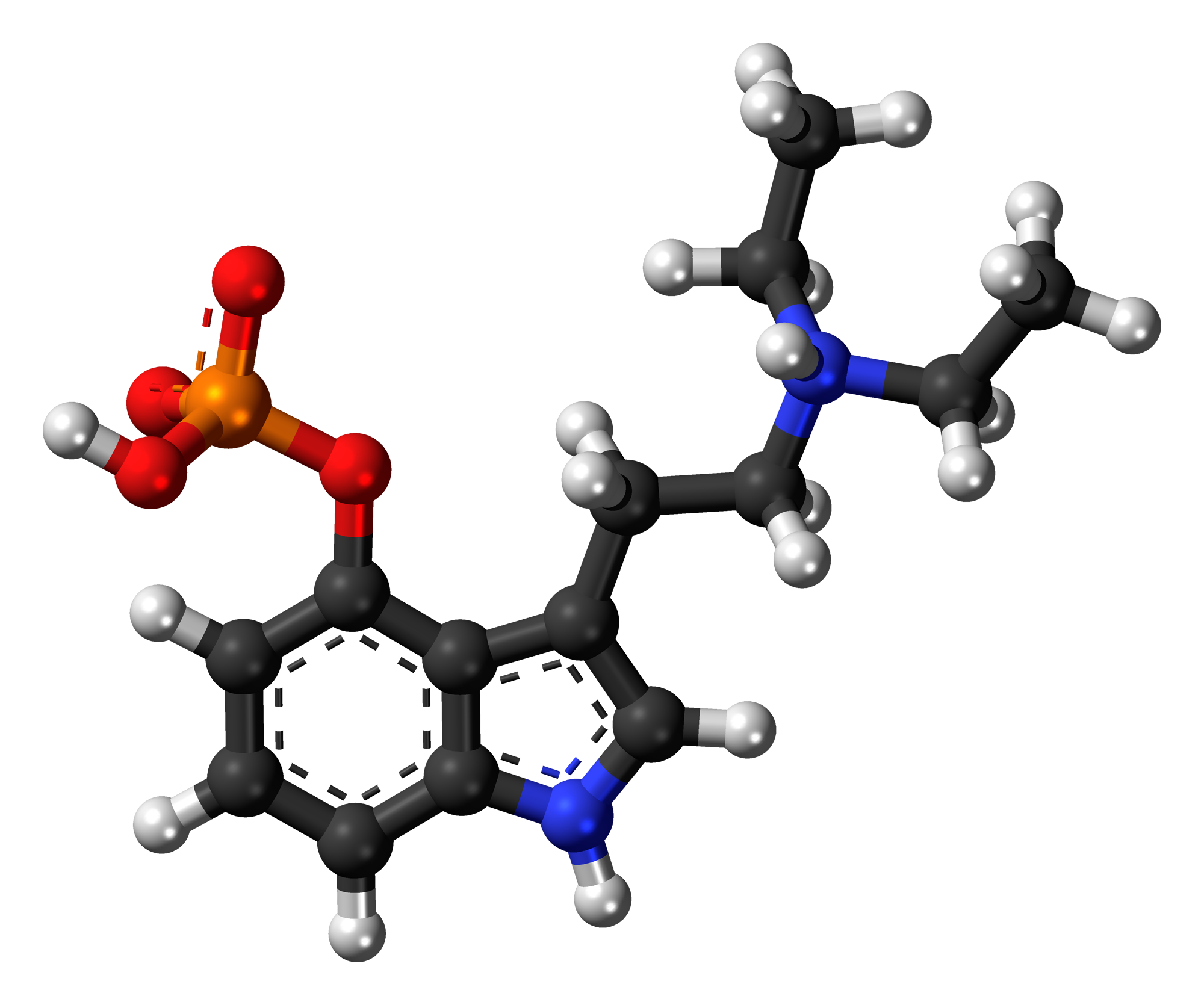

Clinical data
- Other names: 4-Phosphoryloxy-N,N-diethyltryptamine; CEY-19; 4-phosphoryloxy-DET; 4-PO-DET
- Routes of administration: Oral
- Drug class: Serotonin receptor agonist; Serotonin 5-HT_{2A} receptor agonist; Serotonergic psychedelic; Hallucinogen
- ATC code: None

Legal status
- Legal status: DE: Anlage I (Authorized scientific use only); UK: Class A

Pharmacokinetic data
- Duration of action: 2–6 hours

Identifiers
- IUPAC name: Phosphoric acid mono-[3-(2-diethylamino-ethyl)-1H-indol-4-yl] ester
- CAS Number: 60480-02-6
- PubChem CID: 53633102
- ChemSpider: 21106438
- UNII: Z47K2YT973
- CompTox Dashboard (EPA): DTXSID80705541

Chemical and physical data
- Formula: C_{14}H_{21}N_{2}O_{4}P
- Molar mass: 312.306 g·mol^{−1}
- 3D model (JSmol): Interactive image
- SMILES: CCN(CC)CCC2=CNC1=CC=CC(OP(O)(O)=O)=C12
- InChI: InChI=1S/C14H21N2O4P/c1-3-16(4-2)9-8-11-10-15-12-6-5-7-13(14(11)12)20-21(17,18)19/h5-7,10,15H,3-4,8-9H2,1-2H3,(H2,17,18,19); Key:AAVKQQUBPHSCML-UHFFFAOYSA-N

Ethocybin also known as 4-phosphoryloxy-N,N-diethyltryptamine (4-PO-DET) or as CEY-19, is a psychedelic drug of the tryptamine and 4-hydroxytryptamine families related to the psilocybin-containing mushroom alkaloid psilocybin. It is assumed to act as a prodrug of 4-HO-DET (CZ-74) analogously to how psilocybin (4-PO-DMT) acts as a prodrug of psilocin (4-HO-DMT). The drug was first described in the literature by Albert Hofmann and colleagues at Sandoz by 1963.

== Pharmacology ==
Ethocybin may be dephosphorylated in vivo to 4-HO-DET (ethocin), analogously to how psilocybin (4-PO-DMT) is metabolized to psilocin (4-HO-DMT). This chemical reaction takes place under strongly acidic conditions or enzymatically by phosphatases in the body. 4-HO-DET acts as a partial agonist of the serotonin 5-HT_{2A} receptor.

== Chemistry ==
=== Analogues ===
Analogues of ethocybin include 4-HO-DET (ethocin), 4-AcO-DET (ethacetin), psilocybin (4-PO-DMT), psilocin (4-HO-DMT), baeocystin (4-PO-NMT), and aeruginascin (4-PO-TMT), among others.

== History ==
Albert Hofmann and colleagues working at Sandoz were the first to synthesize and describe ethocybin (CEY-19) along with 4-HO-DET (CZ-74), which shortly followed his discovery of psilocin and psilocybin. They first described the drug in a patent by 1963. Along with 4-HO-DET, ethocybin was one of the earliest structurally modified or synthetic psychedelic tryptamines to be developed.

== Society and culture ==
=== Legal status ===
==== Canada ====
Ethocybin is not an explicitly nor implicitly controlled substance in Canada as of 2025.

==== United States ====
Ethocybin is not an explicitly controlled substance in the United States. However, it could be considered a controlled substance under the Federal Analogue Act if intended for human consumption.

== Research ==
Ethocybin, under the code name CEY-19 and along with 4-HO-DET (CZ-74), has been studied in psychedelic-assisted psychotherapy.

== See also ==
- Substituted tryptamine
