= 5-Fluoro-EPT =

Chemical compound

Identifiers
- IUPAC name: N-ethyl-N-[2-(5-fluoro-1H-indol-3-yl)ethyl]propan-1-amine
- CAS Number: 2698331-33-6
- PubChem CID: 156836218
- ChemSpider: 129221323
- ChEMBL: ChEMBL5028990

Chemical and physical data
- Formula: C_{15}H_{21}FN_{2}
- Molar mass: 248.345 g·mol^{−1}
- 3D model (JSmol): Interactive image
- SMILES: CCCN(CC)CCC1=CNC2=C1C=C(C=C2)F
- InChI: InChI=1S/C15H21FN2/c1-3-8-18(4-2)9-7-12-11-17-15-6-5-13(16)10-14(12)15/h5-6,10-11,17H,3-4,7-9H2,1-2H3; Key:QONMHCQBCANXJS-UHFFFAOYSA-N

5-Fluoro-EPT (5F-EPT, 5-fluoro-N-ethyl-N-propyltryptamine) is a psychedelic tryptamine derivative related to drugs such as EPT and 5-MeO-EPT. It acts as a potent full agonist at the 5-HT_{2A} receptor with an EC_{50} of 5.54 nM and an efficacy of 104% (compared to serotonin). It produces a head-twitch response in animal studies, and is claimed to have antidepressant activity.

== See also ==
- Substituted tryptamine
- 5-Fluoro-AMT
- 5-Fluoro-AET
- 5-Fluoro-DMT
- 5-Fluoro-DET
- 5-Fluoro-MET
- 5-Fluoro-T
