= 5-MeO-MET =

Chemical compound

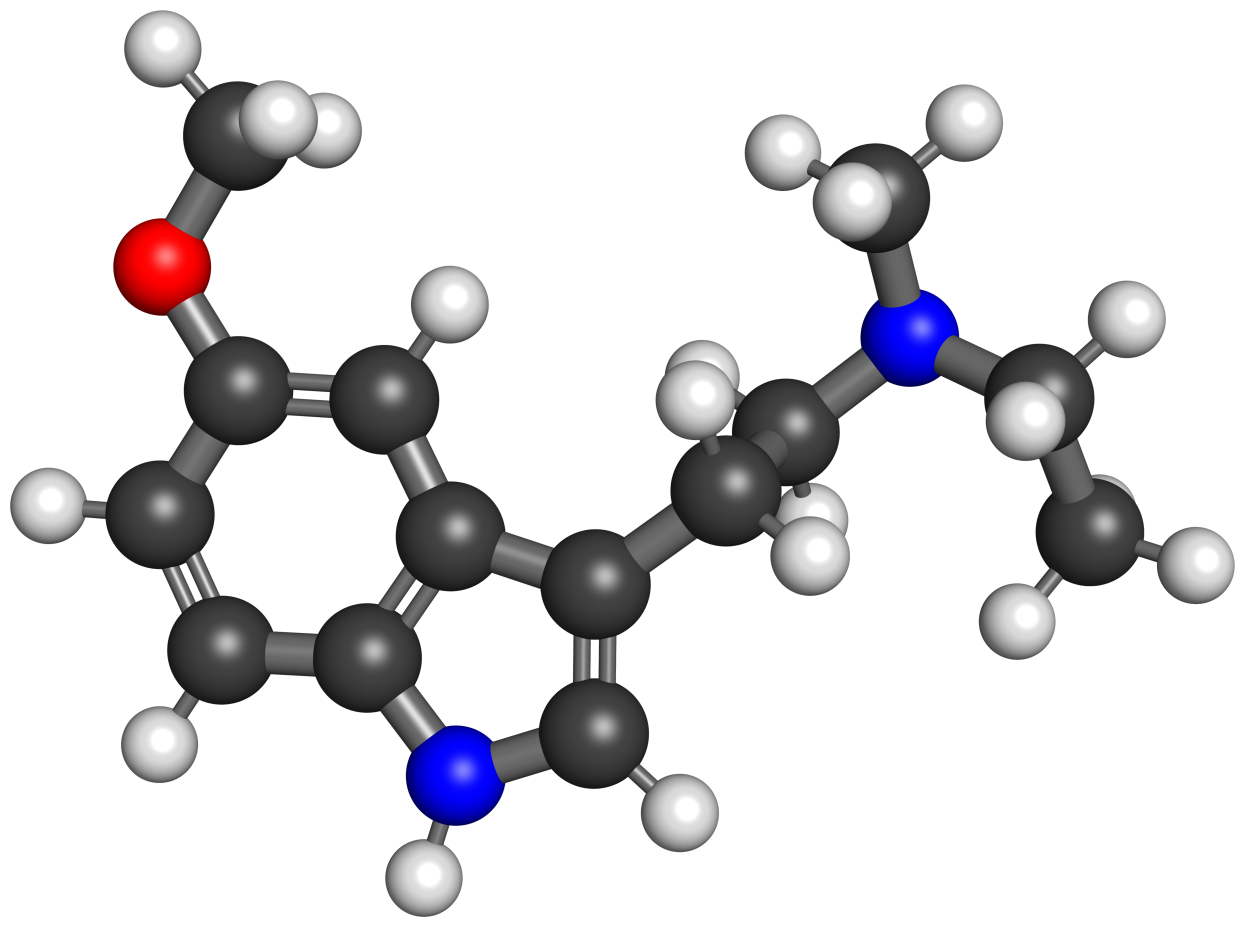

Clinical data
- Other names: 5-OMe-MET; 5-Methoxy-N-methyl-N-ethyltryptamine
- Drug class: Serotonin receptor modulator; Serotonin 5-HT_{2A} receptor agonist; Serotonergic psychedelic; Hallucinogen

Pharmacokinetic data
- Onset of action: Unknown
- Duration of action: Unknown

Identifiers
- IUPAC name: N-ethyl-2-(5-methoxy-1H-indol-3-yl)-N-methylethan-1-amine
- CAS Number: 16977-53-0
- PubChem CID: 6619012
- ChemSpider: 5051184
- UNII: 2CNT3HAM6G
- CompTox Dashboard (EPA): DTXSID10937676

Chemical and physical data
- Formula: C_{14}H_{20}N_{2}O
- Molar mass: 232.327 g·mol^{−1}
- 3D model (JSmol): Interactive image
- SMILES: CCN(CCc1c[nH]c2c1cc(OC)cc2)C
- InChI: InChI=1S/C14H20N2O/c1-4-16(2)8-7-11-10-15-14-6-5-12(17-3)9-13(11)14/h5-6,9-10,15H,4,7-8H2,1-3H3; Key:AVECDEWGCOLCPZ-UHFFFAOYSA-N

5-MeO-MET, also known as 5-methoxy-N-methyl-N-ethyltryptamine, is a serotonin receptor modulator, putative serotonergic psychedelic, and relatively rare designer drug of the tryptamine family related to psychedelic drugs like methylethyltryptamine (MET) and 5-MeO-DMT.

== Use and effects ==
5-MeO-MET was not included nor mentioned in Alexander Shulgin's book TiHKAL (Tryptamines I Have Known and Loved). Relatedly, its properties, such as dose and duration, and its effects were not described. However, Nervewing later described the effects of 5-MeO-MET in an interview with Hamilton Morris and elsewhere. They described 5-MeO-MET as producing no interesting psychological effects, as feeling like they had purely physically poisoned themselves, as feeling terrible and miserable, and as causing specific symptoms including nausea, chills, muscle aches, and almost vomiting, among others.

== Pharmacology ==
=== Pharmacodynamics ===
Early studies found 5-MeO-MET to be more potent in animal behavioral tests than 5-MeO-DMT. Subsequent studies confirmed that 5-MeO-MET interacts with serotonin receptors similarly to other psychedelic tryptamines. A more modern study found that 5-MeO-MET is a potent serotonin 5-HT_{1A} receptor ligand and serotonin 5-HT_{2A} receptor agonist and produces the head-twitch response, a behavioral proxy of psychedelics, in rodents. Its activities were of similar potency as 5-MeO-DMT.

== Chemistry ==
=== Analogues ===
Analogues of 5-MeO-MET include methylethyltryptamine (MET), 4-HO-MET (metocin), 4-AcO-MET (metacetin), 4-PrO-MET, 5-HO-MET, bretisilocin (5-fluoro-MET), 7F-5-MeO-MET, 5-MeO-DMT, 5-MeO-DET, 5-MeO-MPT, 5-MeO-EPT, 5-MeO-MALT, and 5-MeO-MiPT, among others.

== History ==
5-MeO-MET was first synthesized and limitedly studied in the 1960s. The drug was first identified on the illicit market in June 2012 in Sweden. It was made illegal in Norway in 2013.

== Society and culture ==
=== Legal status ===
==== Canada ====
5-MeO-MET is not a controlled substance in Canada as of 2025.

==== Sweden ====
5-MeO-MET is a controlled substance in Sweden.

=== Japan ===
On October 27, 2026, Japan's Ministry of Health, Labour and Welfare promulgated a ministerial ordinance designating 5-MeO-MET and its salts as designated substances under the Pharmaceuticals and Medical Devices Act. The national designation takes effect on November 6, 2026.

Separately, Tokyo, Osaka, Chiba, Aichi, and Gunma introduced prefectural restrictions on 5-MeO-MET effective October 28, 2026, nine days before the national designation took effect. Historical designation records from these prefectures show that such local measures serve as interim controls and are subsequently withdrawn or lapse when corresponding national restrictions take effect.

==== United States ====
5-MeO-MET is not an explicitly controlled substance in the United States. However, it could be considered a controlled substance under the Federal Analogue Act if intended for human consumption.

== See also ==
- Substituted tryptamine
