= 4-AcO-MPT =

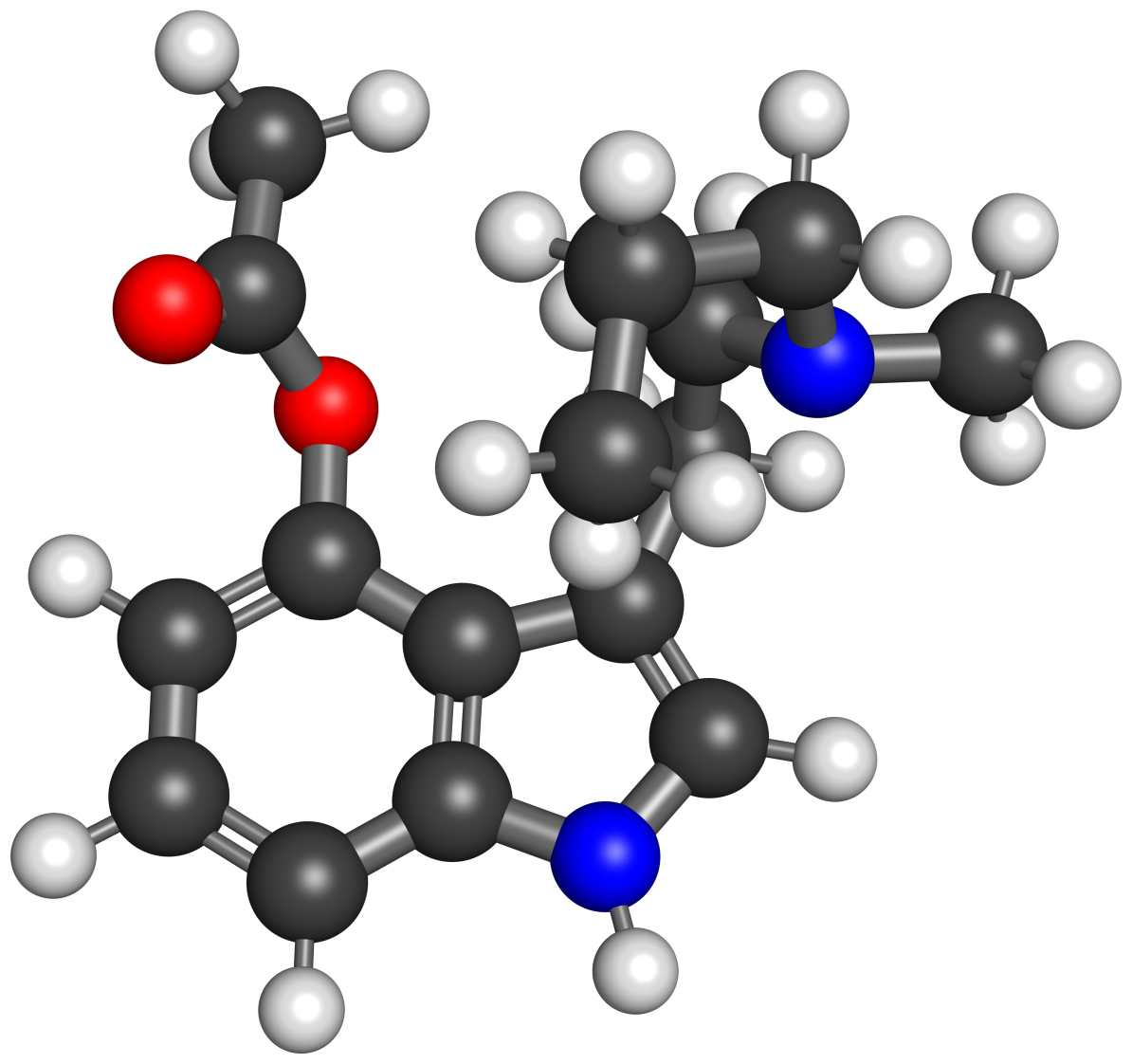

Clinical data
- Other names: 4-Acetoxy-MPT; 4-Acetoxy-N-methyl-N-propyltryptamine
- Routes of administration: Oral
- Drug class: Non-selective serotonin receptor agonist; Serotonin 5-HT_{2A} receptor agonist; Serotonergic psychedelic; Hallucinogen
- ATC code: None

Identifiers
- IUPAC name: [3-[2-[methyl(propyl)amino]ethyl]-1H-indol-4-yl] acetate
- CAS Number: 2173386-55-3
- PubChem CID: 140837843
- ChemSpider: 84400425
- UNII: D28FL93BLV

Chemical and physical data
- Formula: C_{16}H_{22}N_{2}O_{2}
- Molar mass: 274.364 g·mol^{−1}
- 3D model (JSmol): Interactive image
- SMILES: CCCN(C)CCC1=CNC2=C1C(=CC=C2)OC(=O)C
- InChI: InChI=1S/C16H22N2O2/c1-4-9-18(3)10-8-13-11-17-14-6-5-7-15(16(13)14)20-12(2)19/h5-7,11,17H,4,8-10H2,1-3H3; Key:CECCEKYTLKWWJJ-UHFFFAOYSA-N

4-AcO-MPT, also known as 4-acetoxy-N-methyl-N-propyltryptamine, is a psychedelic drug of the tryptamine and 4-hydroxytryptamine families related to 4-AcO-DMT (psilacetin).

== Pharmacology ==
=== Pharmacodynamics ===
4-AcO-MPT is thought to act as a prodrug of 4-HO-MPT and hence is believed to act as a non-selective serotonin receptor agonist including of the serotonin 5-HT_{2A} receptor. The receptor interactions of 4-AcO-MPT have been studied. The drug produces the head-twitch response, a behavioral proxy of psychedelic effects, in rodents,

== Chemistry ==
=== Analogues ===
Analogues of 4-AcO-MPT include methylpropyltryptamine (MPT), 4-HO-MPT (meprocin), 5-MeO-MPT, 4-AcO-DMT (psilacetin), 4-AcO-MET (metacetin), 4-AcO-MiPT (mipracetin), and 4-AcO-DPT (depracetin), among others.

== History ==
4-AcO-MPT was first described in the scientific literature by at least 2017. It was first encountered as a novel designer drug in 2018.

== Society and culture ==
=== Legal status ===
==== Canada ====
4-AcO-MPT is not a controlled substance in Canada as of 2025.

==== Sweden ====
4-AcO-MPT is a controlled substance in Sweden.

== See also ==
- Substituted tryptamine
