= 5-HO-MET =

Clinical data
- Other names: 5-OH-MET; 5-Hydroxy-MET; 5-Hydroxy-N-methyl-N-ethyltryptamine
- Drug class: Serotonergic psychedelic; Hallucinogen
- ATC code: None

Identifiers
- IUPAC name: 3-[2-[ethyl(methyl)amino]ethyl]-1H-indol-5-ol
- CAS Number: 1443666-13-4
- PubChem CID: 146478790

Chemical and physical data
- Formula: C_{13}H_{18}N_{2}O
- Molar mass: 218.300 g·mol^{−1}
- 3D model (JSmol): Interactive image
- SMILES: CCN(C)CCC1=CNC2=C1C=C(C=C2)O
- InChI: InChI=1S/C13H18N2O/c1-3-15(2)7-6-10-9-14-13-5-4-11(16)8-12(10)13/h4-5,8-9,14,16H,3,6-7H2,1-2H3; Key:BQUBMTNAIITQAI-UHFFFAOYSA-N

5-HO-MET, also known as 5-hydroxy-N-methyl-N-ethyltryptamine, is a psychedelic drug of the tryptamine and 5-hydroxytryptamine families related to bufotenin (5-HO-DMT). It is the derivative of bufotenin in which one of the two methyl groups at the amine has been extended to an ethyl group. The drug is also an analogue of methylethyltryptamine (MET), 4-HO-MET (metocin), and 5-MeO-MET. 5-HO-MET was reported as a novel designer drug in Canada in 2025. Its predicted log P is 1.6, relative to 1.2 in the case of bufotenin.

== See also ==
- Substituted tryptamine
