= Ethylisopropyltryptamine =

Chemical compound

EiPT

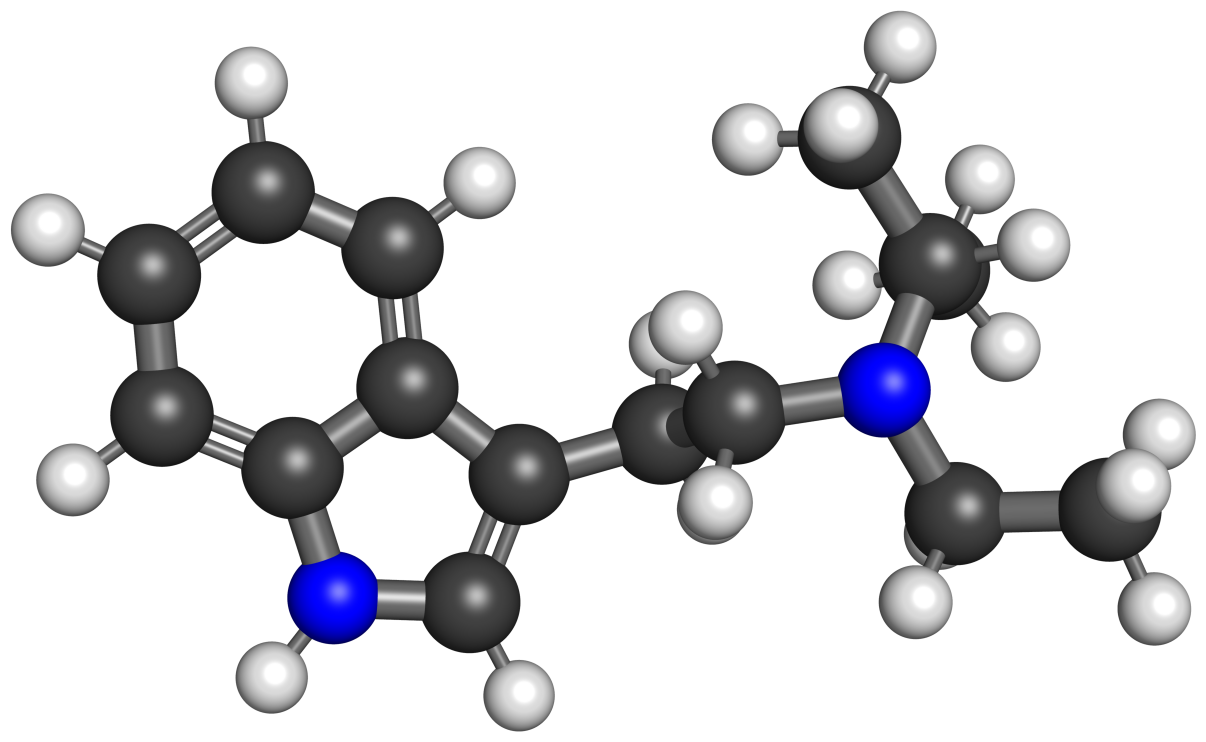

Clinical data
- Other names: EiPT; N-Ethyl-N-isopropyltryptamine
- Routes of administration: Oral
- Drug class: Psychedelic drug; Serotonergic psychedelic
- ATC code: none

Legal status
- Legal status: DE: NpSG (Industrial and scientific use only); UK: Class A

Pharmacokinetic data
- Duration of action: 4–6 hours

Identifiers
- IUPAC name: N-ethyl-N-[2-(1H-indol-3-yl)ethyl]propan-2-amine
- CAS Number: 848130-11-0
- PubChem CID: 44719455
- ChemSpider: 21106305
- UNII: 63J8CXV5Z8
- CompTox Dashboard (EPA): DTXSID60660346

Chemical and physical data
- Formula: C_{15}H_{22}N_{2}
- Molar mass: 230.355 g·mol^{−1}
- 3D model (JSmol): Interactive image
- Melting point: 71 to 73 °C (160 to 163 °F)
- SMILES: CCN(C(C)C)CCc1c[nH]c2ccccc12
- InChI: InChI=1S/C15H22N2/c1-4-17(12(2)3)10-9-13-11-16-15-8-6-5-7-14(13)15/h5-8,11-12,16H,4,9-10H2,1-3H3; Key:HQZLBYMOYCJZRF-UHFFFAOYSA-N

Ethylisopropyltryptamine (EiPT), also known as N-ethyl-N-isopropyltryptamine, is a psychedelic drug of the tryptamine family. It is taken orally.

EiPT appears to have been first synthesized and described by Alexander Shulgin following the Speeter-Anthony route.

== Use and effects ==
In his book TiHKAL (Tryptamines I Have Known and Loved), Alexander Shulgin lists the dose of EiPT as 24 to 40 mg and its duration as 4 to 6 hours. According to Shulgin, this compound tends to produce nausea, dysphoria, and other unpleasant side effects. It also seems to largely lack the hallucinatory and visual properties usually associated with psychedelic drugs.

== Chemistry ==
EiPT is short for N-ethyl-N-isopropyltryptamine. The full chemical name of this structure is N-ethyl-N-[2-(1H-indol-3-yl)ethyl]propan-2-amine. The compound is a substituted tryptamine, which all belong to a larger family of compounds known as indolethylamines.

=== Synthesis ===
The chemical synthesis of EiPT has been described.

=== Analogues ===
Analogues of EiPT include 4-HO-EiPT, 4-AcO-EiPT, 5-MeO-EiPT, methylisopropyltryptamine (MiPT), propylisopropyltryptamine (PiPT), ethylpropyltryptamine (EPT), diethyltryptamine (DET), and diisopropyltryptamine (DiPT), among others.

== Society and culture ==
=== Legal status ===
==== United States ====
EiPT is unscheduled and uncontrolled in the United States, but possession and sales of EiPT could be prosecuted under the Federal Analog Act because of its structural similarities to DET.

== See also ==
- Substituted tryptamine
