= 4-AcO-EiPT =

Clinical data
- Other names: 4-AcO-EIPT; 4-Acetoxy-N-ethyl-N-isopropyltryptamine; Ethipracetin; Eipracetin
- Drug class: Serotonergic psychedelic; Hallucinogen
- ATC code: None

Identifiers
- IUPAC name: [3-[2-[ethyl(propan-2-yl)amino]ethyl]-1H-indol-4-yl] acetate
- CAS Number: 3038824-69-7
- PubChem CID: 156137202
- ChemSpider: 129433247
- UNII: FL46K98B4Q

Chemical and physical data
- Formula: C_{17}H_{24}N_{2}O_{2}
- Molar mass: 288.391 g·mol^{−1}
- 3D model (JSmol): Interactive image
- SMILES: CCN(CCC1=CNC2=C1C(=CC=C2)OC(=O)C)C(C)C
- InChI: InChI=1S/C17H24N2O2/c1-5-19(12(2)3)10-9-14-11-18-15-7-6-8-16(17(14)15)21-13(4)20/h6-8,11-12,18H,5,9-10H2,1-4H3; Key:VYHGUTGSNXCMKF-UHFFFAOYSA-N

4-AcO-EiPT, also known as 4-acetoxy-N-ethyl-N-isopropyltryptamine or as ethipracetin, is a psychedelic drug of the tryptamine and 4-hydroxytryptamine families related to 4-AcO-DMT (psilacetin). It is the acetate ester of 4-HO-EiPT (ethiprocin) and a skeletal isomer of 4-AcO-EPT. The drug is taken orally. It is said to be similar in effects to 5-MeO-DiPT, producing psychedelic and mild stimulant effects. The pharmacology and toxicity of 4-AcO-EiPT have not been studied, but it is assumed that it acts on serotonin receptors. 4-AcO-EiPT was first discussed online in 2011. It was encountered as a novel designer drug being sold by online vendors in early 2022.

== See also ==
- Substituted tryptamine
