= 4-HO-MPT =

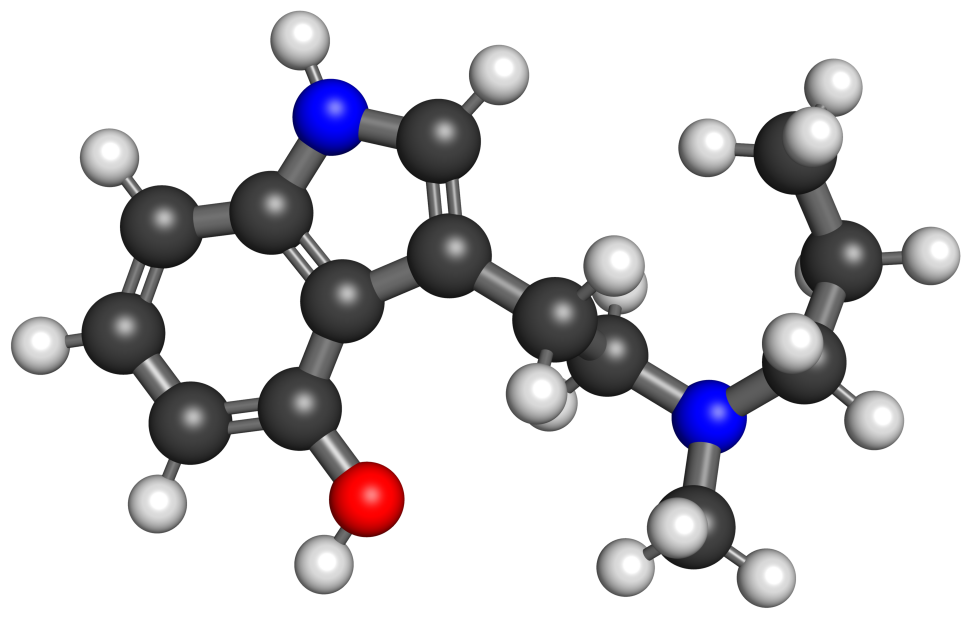

Clinical data
- Other names: 4-OH-MPT; 4-Hydroxy-N-methyl-N-propyltryptamine; Meprocin
- Routes of administration: Oral
- Drug class: Non-selective serotonin receptor agonist; Serotonin 5-HT_{2A} receptor agonist; Serotonergic psychedelic; Hallucinogen
- ATC code: None

Identifiers
- IUPAC name: 3-[2-[methyl(propyl)amino]ethyl]-1H-indol-4-ol
- CAS Number: 763035-03-6 (free base) 77872-42-5 (hydrochloride)
- PubChem CID: 21786584
- ChemSpider: 10513074
- UNII: 37A55H0XW4
- CompTox Dashboard (EPA): DTXSID90904008

Chemical and physical data
- Formula: C_{14}H_{20}N_{2}O
- Molar mass: 232.327 g·mol^{−1}
- 3D model (JSmol): Interactive image
- SMILES: OC1=CC=CC2=C1C(CCN(C)CCC)=CN2
- InChI: InChI=1S/C14H20N2O/c1-3-8-16(2)9-7-11-10-15-12-5-4-6-13(17)14(11)12/h4-6,10,15,17H,3,7-9H2,1-2H3; Key:XFQDDPQGBLSNCN-UHFFFAOYSA-N

4-HO-MPT, also known as 4-hydroxy-N-methyl-N-propyltryptamine or as meprocin, is a psychedelic drug of the tryptamine and 4-hydroxytryptamine families. It is a higher homologue of psilocin (4-HO-DMT) as well as the 4-hydroxyl analogue of N-methyl-N-propyltryptamine (MPT). The drug is taken orally.

It acts as a non-selective serotonin receptor agonist, including of the serotonin 5-HT_{2A} receptor. The drug produces psychedelic-like effects in animals.

4-HO-MPT was first described in the scientific literature by 1981. It was encountered as a novel designer drug by 2021.

== Use and effects ==
The dose and duration of 4-HO-MPT are listed as "unknown" in Alexander Shulgin's book TiHKAL (Tryptamines I Have Known and Loved). In more recent publications, the dose has been reported to be 20 to 30 mg orally, with a mean dose of 25 mg. In a single trial of 8 mg 4-HO-MPT hydrochloride orally from TiHKAL, it was described as producing visual distortion, vertigo, and slight insomnia.

== Pharmacology ==
=== Pharmacodynamics ===
4-HO-MPT activities
Target	Affinity (K_{i}, nM)
5-HT_{1A}	106–910 (K_{i}); 490 (EC_{50}); 90% (E_{max})
5-HT_{1B}	224
5-HT_{1D}	170
5-HT_{1E}	246
5-HT_{2A}	71–114 (K_{i}); 3.8–64^{a} (EC_{50}); 53%^{a}–98% (E_{max})
5-HT_{2B}	8 (K_{i}); 3.4 (EC_{50}); 58% (E_{max})
5-HT_{2C}	150–203 (K_{i}); 46–66^{a} (EC_{50}); 83–100%^{a} (E_{max})
5-HT_{5A}	664
5-HT_{6}	48
5-HT_{7}	99
α_{2A}	3,625
α_{2B}	1,844
α_{2C}	IA
D_{2}	IA
D_{3}	921
D_{4}, D_{5}	IA
H_{1}	92
H_{2}	IA
M_{4}	IA
σ_{1}	891
σ_{2}	1,166
KOR	IA
NR2B	3,658
SERT	910–1,180 (K_{i}); 575 (IC_{50})
DAT	IA
Notes: The smaller the value, the more avidly the drug binds to the site. Footnotes: ^{a} = Stimulation of IP_{1} formation. Sources:

4-HO-MPT acts as a potent agonist of the serotonin 5-HT_{2A}, 5-HT_{2B}, and 5-HT_{2C} receptors. It is a partial or full agonist of the serotonin 5-HT_{2A} receptor, a moderate-efficacy partial agonist of the serotonin 5-HT_{2B} receptor, and a high-efficacy partial agonist of the serotonin 5-HT_{2C} receptor. The drug has more than an order of magnitude higher potency as an agonist of the serotonin 5-HT_{2A} and 5-HT_{2B} receptors than as an agonist of the serotonin 5-HT_{2C} receptor. It also interacts with other serotonin receptors such as 5-HT_{6} and 5-HT_{7} receptors with high affinity and non-serotonergic targets. Additionally it inhibits serotonin transporter.

4-HO-MPT produces the head-twitch response, a behavioral proxy of psychedelic effects, in rodents.

== Chemistry ==
=== Synthesis ===
The chemical synthesis of 4-HO-MPT has been described.

=== Analogues ===
Analogues of 4-HO-MPT include methylpropyltryptamine (MPT), 4-AcO-MPT, 5-MeO-MPT, psilocin (4-HO-DMT), 4-HO-DET (ethocin), 4-HO-DPT (deprocin), 4-HO-MET (metocin), and 4-HO-PiPT (iprocin), among others.

== History ==
4-HO-MPT was first described in the scientific literature by David Repke and colleagues in 1981. Subsequently, its effects in humans were described by Alexander Shulgin in his 1997 book TiHKAL (Tryptamines I Have Known and Loved). The drug was encountered as a novel designer drug by 2021.

== Society and culture ==
=== Legal status ===
==== International ====
4-HO-MPT is not scheduled by the United Nations' Convention on Psychotropic Substances.

==== Canada ====
4-HO-MPT is not an explicitly nor implicitly controlled substance in Canada as of 2025.

==== United States ====
4-HO-MPT is not scheduled at the federal level in the United States, but it is possible that 4-HO-MPT could legally be considered an analog of psilocin, in which case, sales or possession with intent for human consumption could potentially be prosecuted under the Federal Analogue Act.

== See also ==
- Substituted tryptamine
