= 4-AcO-EPT =

Clinical data
- Other names: 4-Acetoxy-EPT; 4-Acetoxy-N-ethyl-N-propyltryptamine; 4-HO-EPT AC; 4-OH-EPT AC
- Routes of administration: Oral
- Drug class: Serotonin receptor agonist; Serotonin 5-HT_{2A} receptor agonist; Serotonergic psychedelic; Hallucinogen
- ATC code: None

Identifiers
- IUPAC name: [3-[2-[ethyl(propyl)amino]ethyl]-1H-indol-4-yl] acetate
- CAS Number: 2750249-90-0
- PubChem CID: 138454311
- ChemSpider: 112747177
- CompTox Dashboard (EPA): DTXSID001343207

Chemical and physical data
- Formula: C_{17}H_{24}N_{2}O_{2}
- Molar mass: 288.391 g·mol^{−1}
- 3D model (JSmol): Interactive image
- SMILES: CCCN(CC)CCC1=CNC2=C1C(=CC=C2)OC(=O)C
- InChI: InChI=1S/C17H24N2O2/c1-4-10-19(5-2)11-9-14-12-18-15-7-6-8-16(17(14)15)21-13(3)20/h6-8,12,18H,4-5,9-11H2,1-3H3; Key:VMFRFQVZMZGHOK-UHFFFAOYSA-N

4-AcO-EPT, also known as 4-acetoxy-N-ethyl-N-propyltryptamine, is a psychedelic drug of the tryptamine and 4-hydroxytryptamine families related to 4-AcO-DMT (psilacetin). It is the acetate ester of 4-HO-EPT (eprocin) and is thought to act as a prodrug of 4-HO-EPT. Based on online anecdotal reports, 4-AcO-EPT is said to have a dose of 20 to 30 mg orally. It shows reduced affinity and agonistic potency at serotonin receptors, including the serotonin 5-HT_{2A} receptor, compared to 4-HO-EPT. Similarly to 4-HO-EPT, 4-AcO-EPT produces the head-twitch response, a behavioral proxy of psychedelic effects, in rodents, and does so with comparable potency, in line with it being a prodrug. 4-AcO-EPT was encountered as a novel designer drug online in 2018, in Europe in 2020, and in the United States in 2021.

== Society and culture ==
=== Legal status ===
==== Canada ====
4-AcO-EPT is not a controlled substance in Canada as of 2025.

== See also ==
- Substituted tryptamine
