= 4-HO-DET =

Psychedelic drug

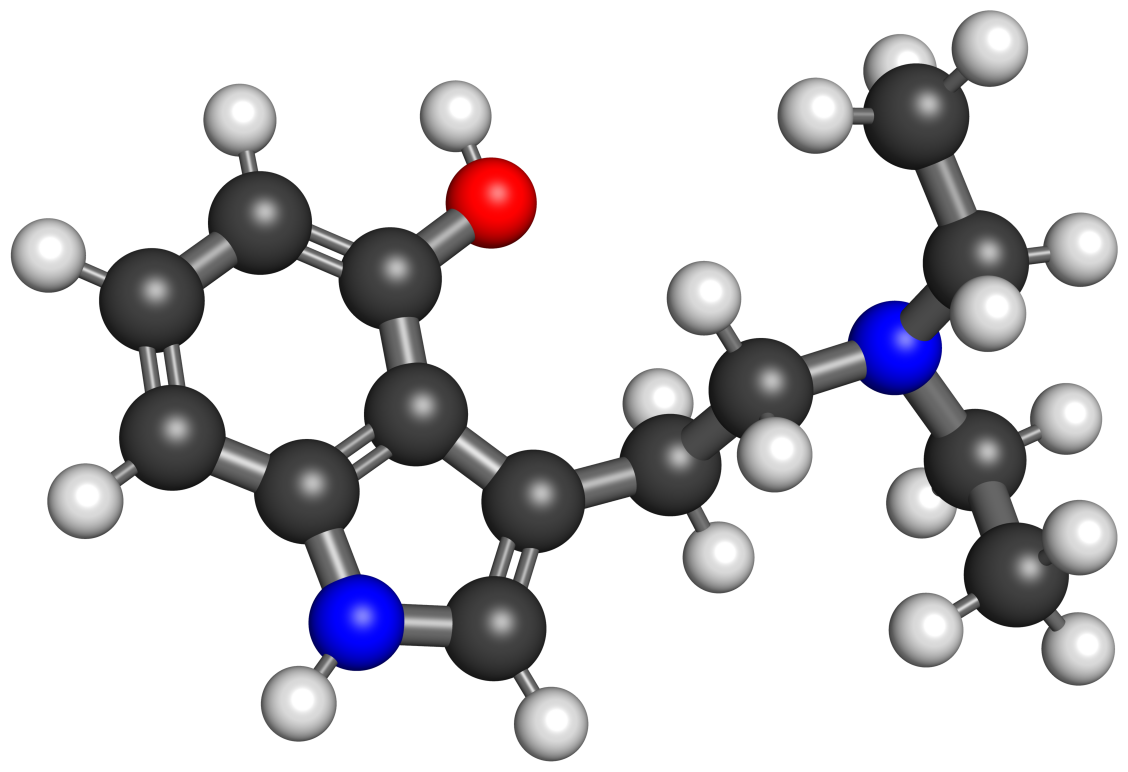

Clinical data
- Other names: 4-Hydroxy-DET; 4-OH-DET; 4-Hydroxy-N,N-diethyltryptamine; Ethocin; CZ-74; CZ74
- Routes of administration: Oral
- Drug class: Serotonin receptor agonist; Serotonin 5-HT_{2A} receptor agonist; Serotonergic psychedelic; Hallucinogen
- ATC code: None

Legal status
- Legal status: DE: Anlage I (Authorized scientific use only); UK: Class A

Pharmacokinetic data
- Onset of action: 30–45 minutes
- Duration of action: 2–6 hours

Identifiers
- IUPAC name: 3-(2-diethylaminoethyl)-1H-indol-4-ol
- CAS Number: 22204-89-3
- PubChem CID: 9991554
- ChemSpider: 8167136
- UNII: 7E0BR15575
- ChEMBL: ChEMBL143202
- CompTox Dashboard (EPA): DTXSID60176755

Chemical and physical data
- Formula: C_{14}H_{20}N_{2}O
- Molar mass: 232.327 g·mol^{−1}
- 3D model (JSmol): Interactive image
- Melting point: 104 to 106 °C (219 to 223 °F)
- SMILES: CCN(CC)CCc1c[nH]c2cccc(O)c12
- InChI: InChI=1S/C14H20N2O/c1-3-16(4-2)9-8-11-10-15-12-6-5-7-13(17)14(11)12/h5-7,10,15,17H,3-4,8-9H2,1-2H3; Key:OHHYMKDBKJPILO-UHFFFAOYSA-N

4-HO-DET, also known as 4-hydroxy-N,N-diethyltryptamine as well as ethocin or CZ-74, is a psychedelic drug of the tryptamine and 4-hydroxytryptamine families related to psilocin (4-HO-DMT). It is taken orally.

The drug acts as a non-selective serotonin receptor agonist, including of the serotonin 5-HT_{2A} receptor among others. It produces psychedelic-like effects in animals. 4-HO-DET is closely structurally related to other psychedelic tryptamines such as psilocin, diethyltryptamine (DET), and 4-HO-MET. Ethocybin (4-PO-DET; CEY-19) and 4-AcO-DET are assumed to act as prodrugs of 4-HO-DET.

4-HO-DET was first described in the literature by 1963. It was developed at Sandoz by Albert Hofmann and colleagues. The drug was studied in psychedelic-assisted psychotherapy by Hanscarl Leuner and colleagues in the 1960s. Later, it was described further by Alexander Shulgin in his 1997 book TiHKAL (Tryptamines I Have Known and Loved). 4-HO-DET was encountered as a novel designer drug in 2005.

== Use and effects ==
In his book TiHKAL (Tryptamines I Have Known and Loved) and other publications, Alexander Shulgin variably lists the dose range of 4-HO-DET as 10 to 25 mg orally, either as 4-HO-DET itself or as presumed prodrugs like ethocybin (4-PO-DET) or 4-AcO-DET, and its duration as 2 to 6 hours. Threshold effects are said to occur at doses of 5 to 15 mg, whereas loss of contact with reality is said to occur at doses over 30 mg. However, strong effects have also been reported at a dose of 15 mg of ethocybin. A typical dose estimate has been reported to be around 17.5 mg. The onset of 4-HO-DET is described as being around 30 to 45 minutes.

The drug has been reported to be very similar to psilocin and psilocybin in its qualitative effects but to be somewhat shorter in duration, for instance as short as 2 to 3 hours. The effects of 4-HO-DET, either as 4-HO-DET itself or as presumed prodrugs, have been reported to include closed-eye visuals, open-eye visuals such as fire light turning into bursts of color, potential for intense psychedelic visuals, auditory hallucinations, time dilation, temporal and spatial disorientation, body image disturbance, musical immersion, derealization, ego death, feeling like one has ceased to exist, feelings of oneness with the universe or reality, ineffability, "sparkly-ness", powerful emotions including feelings of intense love, peace, acceptance, awe, reverence, and joy, feelings of sadness, uncomfortableness, and feeling overwhelmed.

Other effects included feeling intoxicated, sedation, restlessness, loss of language ability, impaired concentration, compulsion to talk and interact with others, and lack of erotic feelings. At very high doses, effects including temporary psychosis, depersonalization, mystical experiences, delirium, schizophrenia-like behavior, catatonia, and paranoia have been found to occur. Physical effects have been reported to include stomach and abdominal discomfort, appetite loss, jaw tightening, body tremors, motor incoordination, body disturbance, diuretic effects, and increased blood pressure.

== Pharmacology ==
=== Pharmacodynamics ===
4-HO-DET activities
Target	Affinity (K_{i}, nM)
5-HT_{1A}	396–1,840 (K_{i}); 1,030 (EC_{50}); 80% (E_{max})
5-HT_{1B}	2,242
5-HT_{1D}	585
5-HT_{1E}	568
5-HT_{2A}	269–400 (K_{i}); 6.5–296^{a} (EC_{50}); 80^{a}–100% (E_{max})
5-HT_{2B}	73 (K_{i}); 6.3 (EC_{50}); 71% (E_{max})
5-HT_{2C}	388–436 (K_{i}); 151^{a}–264 (EC_{50}); 80–83%^{a} (E_{max})
5-HT_{5A}	1,429
5-HT_{6}	230
5-HT_{7A}	826
α_{2A}–α_{2C}	IA
D_{2}–D_{5}	IA
H_{1}	1,079
H_{2}	9,984
M_{4}	IA
σ_{1}	IA
σ_{2}	3,026
NR2B	8,720
SERT	1,411–1,800 (K_{i}); 383 (IC_{50})
DAT	IA
Notes: The smaller the value, the more avidly drug interacts with the site. Footnotes: ^{a} = Stimulation of IP_{1} formation. Sources:

4-HO-DET acts as a potent non-selective serotonin receptor agonist, including of the serotonin 5-HT_{2A}, 5-HT_{2B}, and 5-HT_{2C} receptors. It may also act as a serotonin reuptake inhibitor, with low affinity but moderate potency. The drug showed no significant activity at various other assessed targets, including adrenergic receptors (α_{2A}-, α_{2B}, α_{2C}), dopamine receptors (D_{2}–D_{5}), muscarinic acetylcholine receptors (M_{4}), and the dopamine transporter (DAT).

It induces the head-twitch response, a behavioral proxy of psychedelic effects, in rodents. Its potency for inducing the head-twitch response in mice is approximately 2-fold lower than that of psilocin.

== Chemistry ==
4-HO-DET, also known as 4-hydroxy-N,N-diethyltryptamine, is a substituted tryptamine and 4-hydroxytryptamine. It is the 4-hydroxy derivative of N,N-diethyltryptamine (DET) and is a close analogue of psilocin (4-hydroxy-N,N-dimethyltryptamine; 4-HO-DMT).

=== Synthesis ===
The chemical synthesis of 4-HO-DET has been described.

=== Analogues ===
4-HO-DET is the N,N-diethyl analogue of psilocin (4-HO-DMT). Other analogues of 4-HO-DET include diethyltryptamine (DET), 5-MeO-DET, 4-HO-DPT, 4-HO-MET, 4-HO-EPT, and 5-HO-DET, among others. The acetate ester of 4-HO-DET is known as 4-AcO-DET and the phosphate ester is known as ethocybin (4-PO-DET or CEY-19). These compounds are assumed to be prodrugs of 4-HO-DET, as has been shown with the acetate and phosphate esters of other methylated tryptamines such as psilocin (e.g., psilocybin (4-PO-DMT) and 4-AcO-DMT).

== History ==
4-HO-DET was first described in the literature by 1963. It was developed by Albert Hofmann and Franz Troxler at Sandoz in the 1950s and went by the developmental code name CZ-74. Along with its presumed prodrug ethocybin (4-PO-DET; CEY-19), 4-HO-DET was one of the earliest structurally modified or synthetic psychedelic tryptamines to be developed. It was used along with ethocybin in clinical studies of psychedelic-assisted psychotherapy by the German researchers Hanscarl Leuner and Gerhard Baer in the 1960s. The drug was synthesized and studied, along with many other 4-hydroxytryptamines, by David Repke and colleagues in the 1970s and 1980s. It was later additionally described by Alexander Shulgin in his 1997 book TiHKAL (Tryptamines I Have Known and Loved). 4-HO-DET was encountered as a novel designer drug in Europe in 2005.

== Society and culture ==
=== Religious use ===
The Temple of the True Inner Light once considered 4-HO-DET for religious use but ended up selecting dipropyltryptamine (DPT) instead.

=== Legal status ===
==== Canada ====
4-HO-DET is not a controlled substance in Canada as of 2025.

==== Finland ====
Scheduled in the "government decree on psychoactive substances banned from the consumer market".

==== Sweden ====
Sveriges riksdags health ministry Statens folkhälsoinstitut classified 4-HO-DET as "health hazard" under the act Lagen om förbud mot vissa hälsofarliga varor (translated Act on the Prohibition of Certain Goods Dangerous to Health) as of Nov 1, 2005, in their regulation SFS 2005:733 listed as 4-hydroxi-N,N-diethyltryptamin (4-HO-DET), making it illegal to sell or possess.

==== United States ====
4-HO-DET is unscheduled in the United States, but purchase, sale, or possession for human consumption could be prosecuted under the Federal Analogue Act.

== Research ==
4-HO-DET, under the code name CZ-74 and along with ethocybin (CEY-19), has been studied in psychedelic-assisted psychotherapy.

== See also ==
- Substituted tryptamine
