= 4-HO-MET =

Chemical compound

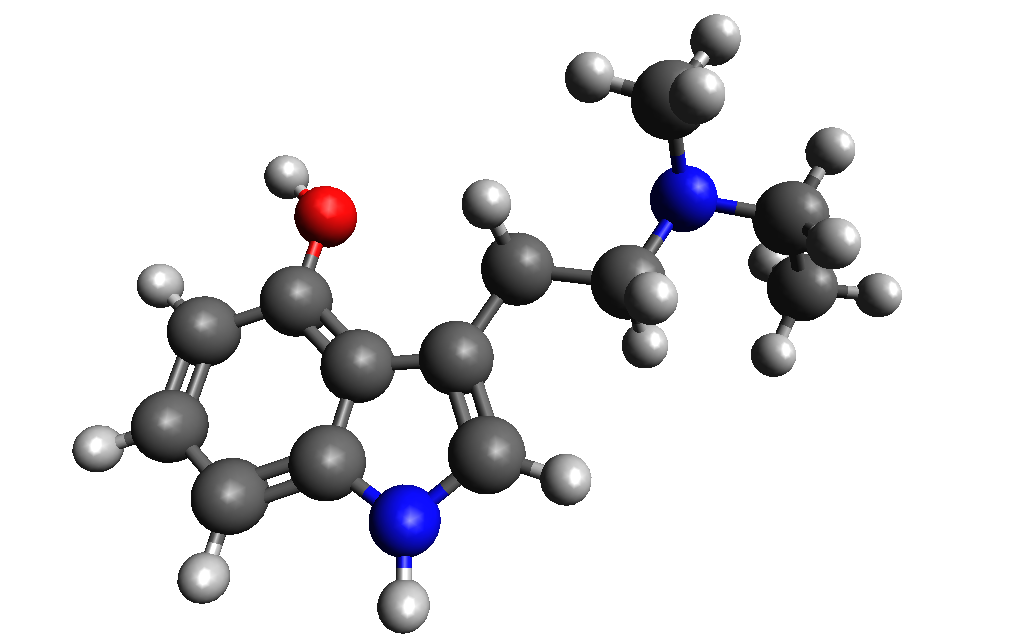

Clinical data
- Other names: 4-OH-MET; 4-Hydroxy-N-methyl-N-ethyltryptamine; Metocin; Methylcybin
- Routes of administration: Oral
- Drug class: Non-selective serotonin receptor agonist; Serotonin 5-HT_{2A} receptor agonist; Serotonergic psychedelic; Hallucinogen
- ATC code: None

Legal status
- Legal status: US: Unscheduled; Schedule I controlled substance in Virginia

Pharmacokinetic data
- Onset of action: ≤30 minutes
- Duration of action: 4–6 hours

Identifiers
- IUPAC name: 3-{2-[Ethyl(methyl)amino]ethyl}-1H-indol-4-ol
- CAS Number: 77872–41–4
- PubChem CID: 21786582
- ChemSpider: 10513072
- UNII: 6RN01B78NY
- CompTox Dashboard (EPA): DTXSID70228491

Chemical and physical data
- Formula: C_{13}H_{18}N_{2}O
- Molar mass: 218.300 g·mol^{−1}
- 3D model (JSmol): Interactive image
- SMILES: CCN(C)CCc2c[nH]c1cccc(O)c12
- InChI: InChI=1S/C13H18N2O/c1-3-15(2)8-7-10-9-14-11-5-4-6-12(16)13(10)11/h4-6,9,14,16H,3,7-8H2,1-2H3; Key:ORWQBKPSGDRPPA-UHFFFAOYSA-N

4-HO-MET, also known as 4-hydroxy-N-methyl-N-ethyltryptamine, as well as metocin or methylcybin, is a psychedelic drug of the tryptamine and 4-hydroxytryptamine families related to psilocin (4-HO-DMT). It is taken orally.

The drug acts as a non-selective serotonin receptor agonist, including of the serotonin 5-HT_{2A} receptor. It is a close structural analogue of psilocin (4-HO-DMT) and is the 4-hydroxyl analogue of methylethyltryptamine (MET).

4-HO-MET was discovered by Alexander Shulgin in the 1970s. It was first described in the literature by David Repke and colleagues in 1981. The drug was encountered as a novel recreational and designer drug by 2008. It is openly sold as a legal recreational drug in the United States.

== Use and effects ==
In his book TiHKAL (Tryptamines I Have Known and Loved), Alexander Shulgin lists the dose range of 4-HO-MET as 10 to 20 mg orally and its duration as 4 to 6 hours. However, a wider recreational dose range of 2 to 45 mg or more orally, with a typical dose estimate of 15 mg, has also been reported. The drug's effects onset is said to be within 5 to 60 minutes, with effects coming up within 5 to 30 minutes. This is followed with a plateau of 90 minutes to 6 hours and coming down phase between 2 to 4 hours. When insufflated, the total duration and duration of each phase is shorter.

The effects of 4-HO-MET have been reported to include pupil dilation, euphoria, tingling sensations, perceptual changes, closed- and open-eye visuals, synesthesia, time dilation, intensified perceptions, thoughts, and feelings, and a general change in thought processes. Other specific effects include alteration of color and form, feeling sounds, and a wave-like experience with alternation between near-normal perception one moment and a "swirl of altered concept" the next moment.

4-HO-MET is said to produce qualitative effects very similar to those of psilocin. Shulgin has stated that he doubts it could be distinguished from psilocin in any blinded clinical study. However, the drug has also been described as being relatively or very light, more clear-headed and functional, and having less head space. On the other hand, it is said to still produce strong psychedelic visuals. This profile of effects has been described as being analogous to the case of 2C-B.

In addition to its use on its own, 4-HO-MET, along with the related tryptamine psychedelic 5-MeO-MiPT, is employed at low doses as a component of the MDMA-mimicking Borax combo.

== Pharmacology ==
=== Pharmacodynamics ===
4-HO-MET activities
Target	Affinity (K_{i}, nM)
5-HT_{1A}	135–950 (K_{i}); 1,390 (EC_{50}); 90% (E_{max})
5-HT_{1B}	331
5-HT_{1D}	197
5-HT_{1E}	161
5-HT_{1F}	ND
5-HT_{2A}	4.0–177 (K_{i}); 18–97 (EC_{50}); 54–95% (E_{max})
5-HT_{2B}	12 (K_{i}); 2.64–>20,000 (EC_{50}); 44–71% (E_{max})
5-HT_{2C}	141–164 (K_{i}); 30–113 (EC_{50}); 87–101% (E_{max})
5-HT_{3}	ND
5-HT_{4}	ND
5-HT_{5A}	304
5-HT_{6}	70
5-HT_{7}	60
α_{1A}	9,700
α_{1B}, α_{1D}	ND
α_{2A}	1,666–2,400
α_{2B}, α_{2C}	IA
β_{1}–β_{3}	ND
β_{2}	ND
D_{1}	25,000
D_{2}	4,000
D_{3}	6,700
D_{4}, D_{5}	IA
H_{1}	483–820
H_{2}	IA
H_{3}, H_{4}	ND
M_{1}–M_{3}, M_{5}	ND
M_{2}	IA
I_{1}	ND
σ_{1}, σ_{2}	IA
TAAR1	12,000 (K_{i}) (mouse); 3,100 (K_{i}) (rat); 2,500 (EC_{50}) (mouse); 2,100 (EC_{50}) (rat) >10,000 (EC_{50}) (human); 78% (E_{max}) (mouse); 71% (E_{max}) (rat)
SERT	200–2,310 (K_{i}); 830–9,000 (IC_{50}); IA (EC_{50})
NET	13,000 (K_{i}); 11,000 (IC_{50}); IA (EC_{50})
DAT	>26,000 (K_{i}) >100,000 (IC_{50}); IA (EC_{50})
Notes: The smaller the value, the more avidly the drug binds to the site. All proteins are human unless otherwise specified. Refs:

4-HO-MET binds to various serotonin receptors and is known to act as an agonist of the serotonin 5-HT_{2A}, 5-HT_{2B}, 5-HT_{2C}, and 5-HT_{1A} receptors. It is thought that the hallucinogenic effects of serotonergic psychedelics like 4-HO-MET are mediated by serotonin 5-HT_{2A} receptor activation.

=== Pharmacokinetics ===
The metabolism of 4-HO-MET has been studied. In vitro experiments using pooled human liver microsomes identified twelve metabolites. Four metabolites were detected in vivo from human urine, of which two were detected in vitro.

== Chemistry ==
4-HO-MET, also known as 4-hydroxy-N-methyl-N-ethyltryptamine, is a substituted tryptamine and 4-hydroxytryptamine. It is the 4-hydroxy derivative of N-methyl-N-ethyltryptamine (MET) and is a close analogue of psilocin (4-hydroxy-N,N-dimethyltryptamine; 4-HO-DMT).

=== Synthesis ===
The chemical synthesis of 4-HO-MET has been described.

=== Analogues ===
Analogues of 4-HO-MET include psilocin (4-HO-DMT), 4-HO-DET (ethocin), 4-HO-MiPT (miprocin), 4-HO-DPT (deprocin), 4-HO-MPT (meprocin), 4-HO-DALT (dalocin), and 4-HO-MALT (malocin), among others. 4-AcO-MET (metacetin) and 4-PrO-MET are ester prodrugs of 4-HO-MET. Other analogues of 4-HO-MET include methylethyltryptamine (MET), 5-HO-MET, and 5-MeO-MET.

== History ==
4-HO-MET was first synthesized and discovered by Alexander Shulgin in the 1970s. It was first described in the scientific literature by David Repke and colleagues by 1981. Subsequently, 4-HO-MET was described by Shulgin in his book TiHKAL (Tryptamines I Have Known and Loved) in 1997 as being- aside from its synthesis- indistinguishable from any other ethyl homologue. It was encountered as a novel recreational and designer drug in Europe by 2008 and recently in the United States in 2025.

== Society and culture ==
=== Recreational use ===
Voyager Labs by Judd Weiss openly sells 4-HO-MET as a legal recreational drug in the United States as of the mid-2020s.

=== Legal status ===
==== Canada ====
4-HO-MET is not a controlled substance in Canada as of 2025.

==== Finland ====
Scheduled in the "government decree on psychoactive substances banned from the consumer market".

==== Germany ====
4-HO-MET is ruled under the Neue-psychoaktive-Stoffe-Gesetz (NpSG) since July 18, 2019. Production and Import with intent to distribute is punishable. Possession is forbidden but not punishable, although ordering it in small quantities can still be seen as an intent to distribute it and be punished.

4-Propionoxy-N-methyl-N-ethyltryptamine (also referred to as 4-PrO-MET) is the ester prodrug of 4-HO-MET. Unlike many other tryptamine derivatives, it is currently not explicitly listed under the German Neue-psychoaktive-Stoffe-Gesetz (NpSG). This means that, while its use as a recreational substance is not legally permitted, the compound may be obtained and handled for legitimate research purposes, provided all other relevant legal requirements and safety regulations are observed.

==== Sweden ====
The Swedish Riksdag added 4-HO-MET to Schedule I ("substances, plant materials and fungi which normally do not have medical use") as narcotics in Sweden as of May 1, 2012, published by Medical Products Agency in their regulation LVFS 2012:6.

==== United Kingdom ====
4-HO-MET is a class A drug in the United Kingdom, as a result of the tryptamine catch-all clause.

==== United States ====
4-HO-MET is not scheduled at the federal level in the United States, but it is possible that it could be considered an analogue of psilocin, in which case purchase, sale, or possession could be prosecuted under the Federal Analogue Act.

It is a schedule I substance in some states, such as South Dakota and West Virginia.

== See also ==
- Substituted tryptamine
