= 5-Fluoro-DET =

Chemical compound

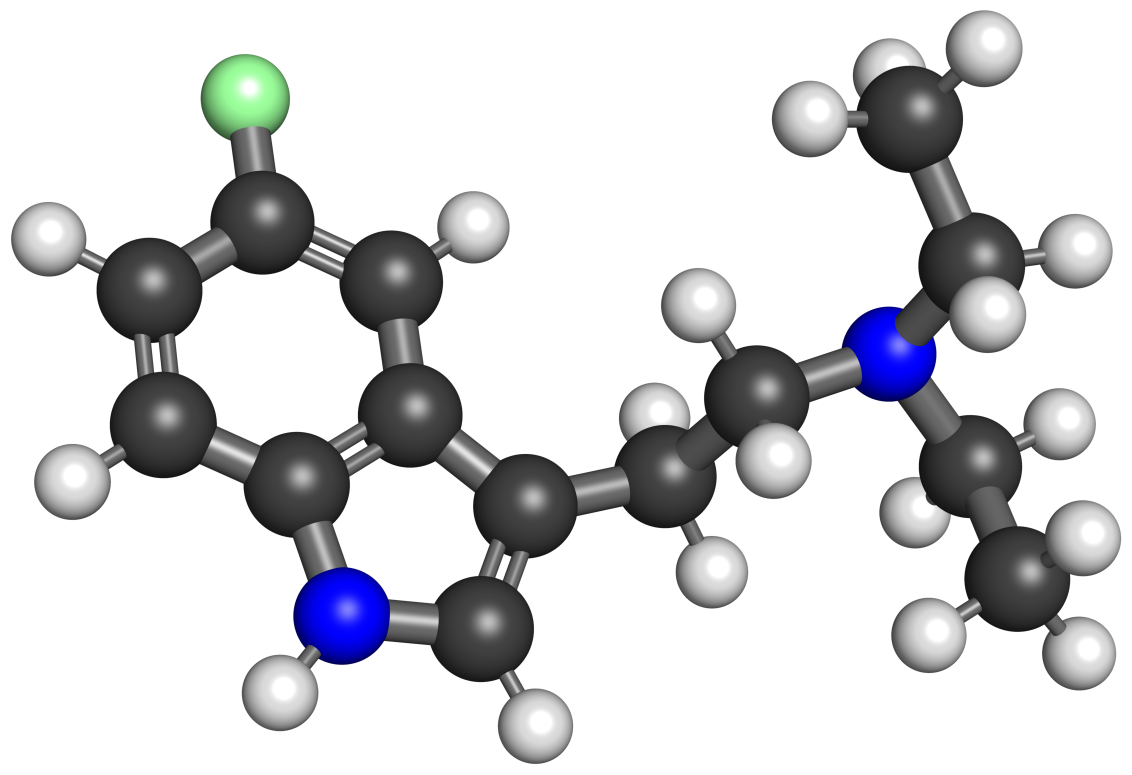

Clinical data
- Other names: 5-F-DET; 5-Fluoro-N,N-diethyltryptamine

Identifiers
- IUPAC name: N,N-diethyl-2-(5-fluoro-1H-indol-3-yl)ethanamine
- CAS Number: 46805-07-6
- PubChem CID: 49856188
- ChemSpider: 26381379
- ChEMBL: ChEMBL1630730

Chemical and physical data
- Formula: C_{14}H_{19}FN_{2}
- Molar mass: 234.318 g·mol^{−1}
- 3D model (JSmol): Interactive image
- SMILES: CCN(CC)CCC1=CNC2=C1C=C(C=C2)F
- InChI: InChI=1S/C14H19FN2/c1-3-17(4-2)8-7-11-10-16-14-6-5-12(15)9-13(11)14/h5-6,9-10,16H,3-4,7-8H2,1-2H3; Key:LBJIPBJDJFZKIQ-UHFFFAOYSA-N

5-Fluoro-DET, or 5-F-DET, also known as 5-fluoro-N,N-diethyltryptamine, is a tryptamine derivative related to drugs such as diethyltryptamine (DET) and 5-MeO-DET. It is known to act as an inhibitor of the enzyme myeloperoxidase, and is also thought to be an agonist at the serotonin 5-HT_{2A} receptor.

== See also ==
- Substituted tryptamine
- 5-Fluoro-DMT
- Bretisilocin (5-fluoro-MET)
- 5-Fluoro-EPT
- 5-Fluorotryptamine
- 6-Fluoro-DET
