= 4-PrO-MET =

Clinical data
- Other names: 4-Propionyloxy-MET; 4-Propionyloxy-N-methyl-N-ethyltryptamine; O-Propionyl-4-HO-MET; O-Propionylmetocin
- Routes of administration: Oral
- Drug class: Serotonergic psychedelic; Hallucinogen
- ATC code: None

Identifiers
- IUPAC name: [3-[2-[ethyl(methyl)amino]ethyl]-1H-indol-4-yl] propanoate
- CAS Number: 3104587-26-7
- PubChem CID: 169222171

Chemical and physical data
- Formula: C_{16}H_{22}N_{2}O_{2}
- Molar mass: 274.364 g·mol^{−1}
- 3D model (JSmol): Interactive image
- SMILES: CCC(=O)OC1=CC=CC2=C1C(=CN2)CCN(C)CC
- InChI: InChI=1S/C16H22N2O2/c1-4-15(19)20-14-8-6-7-13-16(14)12(11-17-13)9-10-18(3)5-2/h6-8,11,17H,4-5,9-10H2,1-3H3; Key:ACMPLXDHJQJMIW-UHFFFAOYSA-N

4-PrO-MET, also known as 4-propionyloxy-N-methyl-N-ethyltryptamine or as O-propionyl-4-HO-MET, is a psychedelic drug of the tryptamine and 4-hydroxytryptamine families related to 4-AcO-DMT (psilacetin). It is thought to be a prodrug of 4-HO-MET (metocin) similarly to 4-AcO-MET (metacetin). 4-PrO-MET was encountered online as a novel designer drug in August or September 2025. It is anecdotally claimed to produce more intense psychedelic visuals than psilocin (4-HO-DMT) but to be "less heavy" and to have good tolerability. 4-PrO-MET is not an explicitly controlled substance in the United States or in Canada.

== See also ==
- Substituted tryptamine
- 4-PrO-DMT and 4-PrO-DiPT
