= Methylethyltryptamine =

Chemical compound

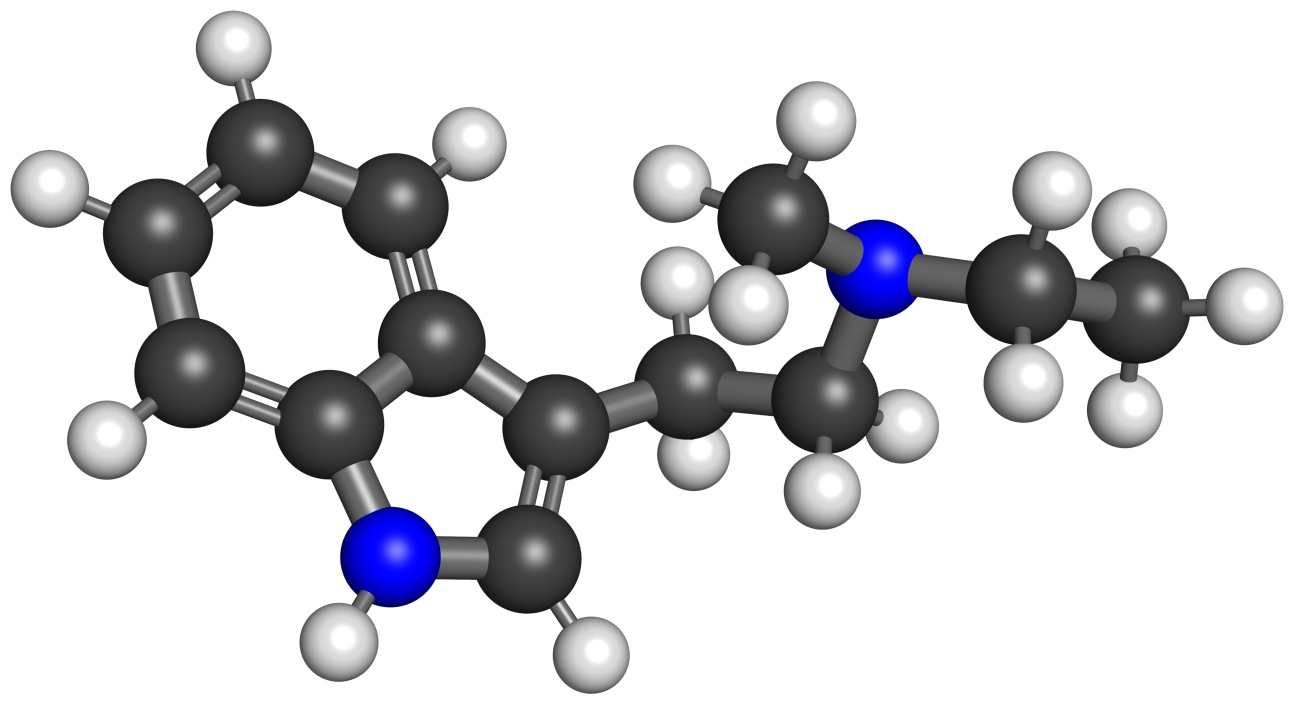

Clinical data
- Other names: MET; N-Methyl-N-ethyltryptamine; N,N-MET
- Routes of administration: Oral; Vaporized/inhaled
- Drug class: Serotonergic psychedelic; Hallucinogen; Serotonin 5-HT_{2A} and 5-HT_{2C} receptor agonist; Serotonin releasing agent
- ATC code: None

Pharmacokinetic data
- Onset of action: Unknown
- Duration of action: Unknown

Identifiers
- IUPAC name: N-ethyl-2-(1H-indol-3-yl)-N-methylethan-1-amine
- CAS Number: 5599-69-9
- PubChem CID: 824845
- ChemSpider: 720502
- UNII: 4KX1J1D3RD
- CompTox Dashboard (EPA): DTXSID901024010

Chemical and physical data
- Formula: C_{13}H_{18}N_{2}
- Molar mass: 202.301 g·mol^{−1}
- 3D model (JSmol): Interactive image
- SMILES: c1cccc2c1c(c[nH]2)CCN(CC)C
- InChI: InChI=1S/C13H18N2/c1-3-15(2)9-8-11-10-14-13-7-5-4-6-12(11)13/h4-7,10,14H,3,8-9H2,1-2H3; Key:MYEGVMLMDWYPOA-UHFFFAOYSA-N

Methylethyltryptamine (MET), also known as N-methyl-N-ethyltryptamine (N,N-MET), is a psychedelic drug of the tryptamine family. It is taken orally or via inhalation.

The drug acts as an agonist of the serotonin 5-HT_{2} receptors and to a lesser extent as a serotonin releasing agent. It is closely related to dimethyltryptamine (DMT) and to diethyltryptamine (DET).

MET appears to have been first described in the literature in 1981. It was only briefly mentioned in Alexander Shulgin's 1997 book TiHKAL (Tryptamines I Have Known and Loved). The drug was encountered as a novel designer drug in Europe in 2014.

== Use and effects ==
MET was briefly mentioned in Alexander Shulgin's TiHKAL (Tryptamines I Have Known and Loved) and other publications, where he has stated it to be orally active as a psychedelic at doses of 80 to 100 mg. Its duration, onset, and peak were not provided. The free base of MET has been reported to be active as a psychedelic via vaporization at a dose of 15 mg per informal anecdotal reports. Very little information is available on the effects of MET. However, its effects have been reported to include hallucinations, euphoria, tactile enhancement, cognitive effects, pupil dilation, muscle cramps, teeth grinding, and increased heart rate and blood pressure.

== Pharmacology ==
=== Pharmacodynamics ===
MET is a serotonin 5-HT_{2A} and 5-HT_{2C} receptor partial agonist. It shows very weak activity as an agonist of the serotonin 5-HT_{1A} and 5-HT_{2B} receptors. In addition to acting at the serotonin 5-HT_{2} receptors, MET is a serotonin releasing agent with lower potency. It produces the head-twitch response, a behavioral proxy of psychedelic effects, in animals.

== Chemistry ==
MET, also known as N-methyl-N-ethyltryptamine, is a substituted tryptamine derivative. It is closely related to N,N-dimethyltryptamine (DMT) and to other N,N-dialkylated tryptamines.

=== Analogues ===
Analogues of MET besides DMT include DET, DPT, DiPT, DBT, MiPT, MBT, EPT, EiPT, and PiPT, among others. Derivatives of MET include 4-HO-MET, 5-HO-MET, 5-MeO-MET, bretisilocin (5-fluoro-MET; GM-2505), and 7-F-5-MeO-MET, among others.

== History ==
MET appears to have first been described in the literature by 1981. It was specifically mentioned in Michael Valentine Smith's Psychedelic Chemistry. Subsequently, MET was briefly described in Alexander Shulgin's TiHKAL (Tryptamines I Have Known and Loved) in 1997. MET was encountered as a novel designer drug in Europe in 2014.

== Society and culture ==
=== Religious use ===
The Temple of the True Inner Light once considered MET for religious use but ended up selecting dipropyltryptamine (DPT) instead.

=== Legal status ===
==== Canada ====
MET is not a controlled substance in Canada as of 2025.

==== United States ====
MET is not an explicitly controlled substance in the United States. However, it could be considered a controlled substance under the Federal Analogue Act if intended for human consumption.

== See also ==
- Substituted tryptamine
- Bretisilocin (5-fluoro-MET; GM-2505)
