= 5-MeO-MPT =

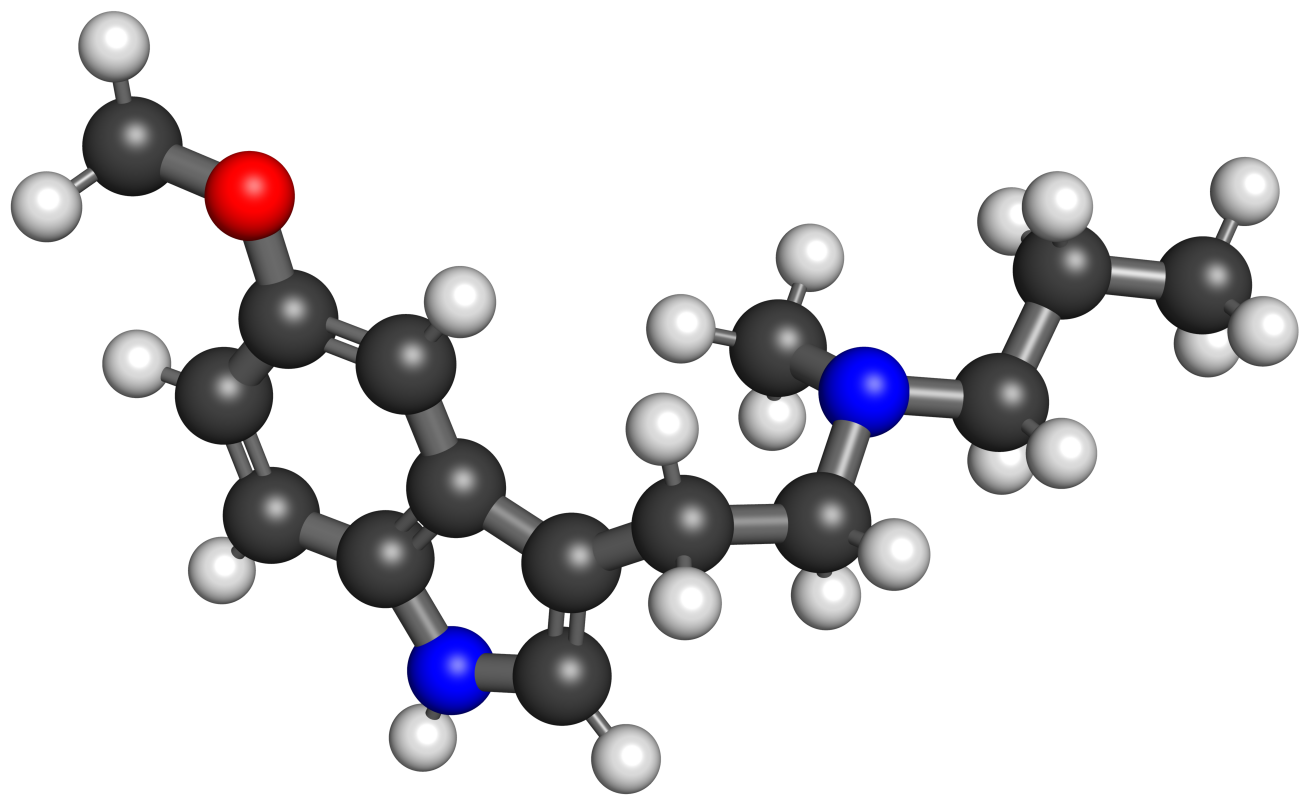

Clinical data
- Other names: 5-Methoxy-N-methyl-N-propyltryptamine
- ATC code: None

Identifiers
- IUPAC name: N-[2-(5-methoxy-1H-indol-3-yl)ethyl]-N-methylpropan-1-amine
- PubChem CID: 74405225

Chemical and physical data
- Formula: C_{15}H_{22}N_{2}O
- Molar mass: 246.354 g·mol^{−1}
- 3D model (JSmol): Interactive image
- SMILES: CCCN(C)CCC1=CNC2=C1C=C(C=C2)OC
- InChI: InChI=1S/C15H22N2O/c1-4-8-17(2)9-7-12-11-16-15-6-5-13(18-3)10-14(12)15/h5-6,10-11,16H,4,7-9H2,1-3H3; Key:YQHARYRPMKOJND-UHFFFAOYSA-N

5-MeO-MPT, also known as 5-methoxy-N-methyl-N-propyltryptamine, is a chemical compound of the tryptamine and 5-methoxytryptamine families. It is closely related to the known psychedelic tryptamine and designer drug 4-HO-MPT as well as to methylpropyltryptamine (MPT).

== Use and effects ==
5-MeO-MPT was not included nor mentioned in Alexander Shulgin's book TiHKAL (Tryptamines I Have Known and Loved).

== Chemistry ==
=== Analogues ===
Analogues of 5-MeO-MPT include methylpropyltryptamine (MPT), 4-HO-MPT (meprocin), 4-AcO-MPT, 5-MeO-DMT, 5-MeO-DET, 5-MeO-DPT, 5-MeO-MET, 5-MeO-MALT, and 5-MeO-MiPT, among others.

== See also ==
- Substituted tryptamine
