= Ethylpropyltryptamine =

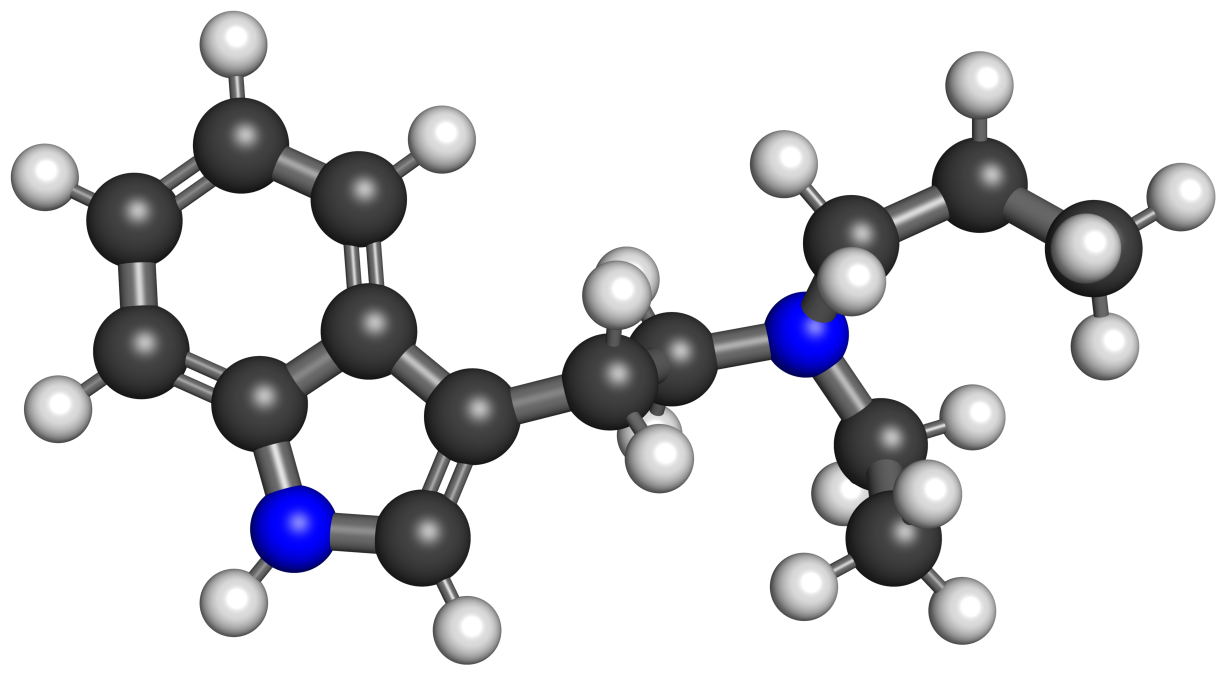

Clinical data
- Other names: EPT; N-Ethyl-N-propyltryptamine
- Drug class: Serotonergic psychedelic; Hallucinogen
- ATC code: None

Identifiers
- IUPAC name: N-ethyl-N-[2-(1H-indol-3-yl)ethyl]propan-1-amine
- CAS Number: 850032-68-7
- PubChem CID: 74405184
- ChemSpider: 81407759
- UNII: FRE36KL4BD
- ChEMBL: ChEMBL4871007
- CompTox Dashboard (EPA): DTXSID101336291

Chemical and physical data
- Formula: C_{15}H_{22}N_{2}
- Molar mass: 230.355 g·mol^{−1}
- 3D model (JSmol): Interactive image
- SMILES: CCCN(CC)CCC1=CNC2=CC=CC=C12
- InChI: InChI=1S/C15H22N2/c1-3-10-17(4-2)11-9-13-12-16-15-8-6-5-7-14(13)15/h5-8,12,16H,3-4,9-11H2,1-2H3; Key:LCDYRMYSOIVPRS-UHFFFAOYSA-N

Ethylpropyltryptamine (EPT), also known as N-ethyl-N-propyltryptamine, is a rarely encountered psychedelic drug in the tryptamine family. It has been identified in illicit products in Japan.

== Use and effects ==
EPT was not included nor mentioned in Alexander Shulgin's book TiHKAL (Tryptamines I Have Known and Loved).

== Chemistry ==
=== Analogues ===
Analogues of EPT include methylethyltryptamine (MET), methylpropyltryptamine (MPT), diethyltryptamine (DET), dipropyltryptamine (DPT), among others.

== Society and culture ==
=== Legal status ===
==== Canada ====
EPT is not a controlled substance in Canada as of 2025.

==== United Kingdom ====
It is illegal to sell, distribute, supply, transport or trade the pharmaceutical drug under the Psychoactive Substances Act of 2016.

==== United States ====
EPT is unscheduled but it may be considered an analogue of DMT, which is a Schedule I drug under the Controlled Substances Act. As such, the sale for human consumption could be illegal under the Federal Analogue Act.

== See also ==
- Substituted tryptamine
