= N-Propyltryptamine =

Clinical data
- Other names: NPT; N-n-Propyltryptamine
- Drug class: Serotonin receptor modulator
- ATC code: None

Identifiers
- IUPAC name: N-[2-(1H-indol-3-yl)ethyl]propan-1-amine
- PubChem CID: 45605
- ChemSpider: 41495

Chemical and physical data
- Formula: C_{13}H_{18}N_{2}
- Molar mass: 202.301 g·mol^{−1}
- 3D model (JSmol): Interactive image
- SMILES: CCCNCCC1=CNC2=CC=CC=C21
- InChI: InChI=1S/C13H18N2/c1-2-8-14-9-7-11-10-15-13-6-4-3-5-12(11)13/h3-6,10,14-15H,2,7-9H2,1H3; Key:KBFBIAGUZWNRFI-UHFFFAOYSA-N

N-Propyltryptamine (NPT) is a serotonin receptor modulator of the tryptamine family related to N-methyltryptamine (NMT). According to Alexander Shulgin in his book TiHKAL (Tryptamines I Have Known and Loved), NPT is not known to have been tested in humans. It acts as a serotonin receptor agonist in the rat uterus and stomach strip, with slightly lower potency than dimethyltryptamine (DMT). However, in contrast to DMT and NMT, NPT did not cause central effects in dogs. It is said to be less toxic than dipropyltryptamine (DPT) in rodents. The chemical synthesis of NPT has been described. NPT was first described in the scientific literature by Speeter and Anthony by 1954. Subsequently, the drug was described by Shulgin in TiHKAL in 1997.

== See also ==
- Substituted tryptamine
