= C14H18N2 =

The molecular formula C_{14}H_{18}N_{2} (molar mass: 214.31 g/mol) may refer to:

- 1,8-Bis(dimethylamino)naphthalene
- Ciclindole
- MALT (psychedelic drug)
- Methylcyclopropyltryptamine
- Pyr-T, or N,N-tetramethylenetryptamine
- 10,11-Secoergoline
- SN-22
- WAY-163909
