= 5,6-MDO-DMT =

Chemical compound

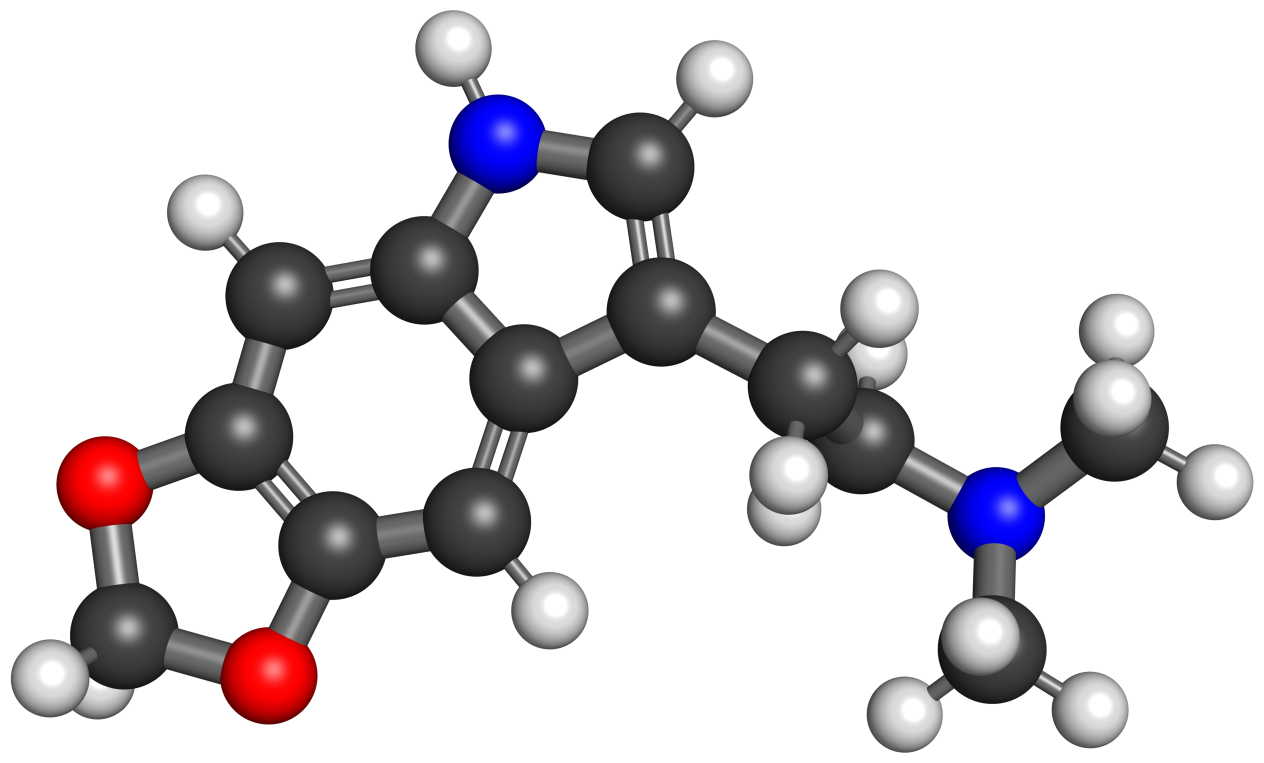

Clinical data
- Routes of administration: Smoking
- ATC code: None

Pharmacokinetic data
- Onset of action: Unknown
- Duration of action: Unknown

Identifiers
- IUPAC name: 2-(5H-[1,3]dioxolo[4,5-f]indol-7-yl)-N,N-dimethylethanamine
- CAS Number: 82173-81-7
- PubChem CID: 13140993
- ChemSpider: 10524352
- UNII: QPJ5N6RF24
- ChEMBL: ChEMBL283686
- CompTox Dashboard (EPA): DTXSID101336584

Chemical and physical data
- Formula: C_{13}H_{16}N_{2}O_{2}
- Molar mass: 232.283 g·mol^{−1}
- 3D model (JSmol): Interactive image
- SMILES: CN(C)CCC1=CNC2=CC3=C(C=C21)OCO3
- InChI: InChI=1S/C13H16N2O2/c1-15(2)4-3-9-7-14-11-6-13-12(5-10(9)11)16-8-17-13/h5-7,14H,3-4,8H2,1-2H3; Key:QHEIGHVZMWJQHB-UHFFFAOYSA-N

5,6-MDO-DMT, or 5,6-methylenedioxy-N,N-dimethyltryptamine, is a lesser-known chemical compound of the tryptamine family. It is the 5,6-methylenedioxy derivative of dimethyltryptamine (DMT) and is an analogue of 5-MeO-DMT. In his 1991 book TiHKAL (Tryptamines I Have Known and Loved), Alexander Shulgin lists the dose as greater than 5 mg smoked and the duration as unknown. 5,6-MDO-DMT produced no effects whatsoever at a dose of 5 mg smoked. Higher doses were not assessed. Very little data exists about the pharmacological properties, metabolism, and toxicity of 5,6-MDO-DMT. Its chemical synthesis has been described. 5,6-MDO-DMT was first described in the scientific literature by Toni B. Kline and colleagues in 1982.

== See also ==
- Substituted tryptamine
- 5,6-MDO-MiPT
- 6-MeO-DMT
