= N-Cyclopropyltryptamine =

Clinical data
- Other names: NcPT
- Drug class: Monoamine oxidase inhibitor (MAOI)
- ATC code: None

Identifiers
- IUPAC name: N-[2-(1H-indol-3-yl)ethyl]cyclopropanamine
- PubChem CID: 41421
- ChemSpider: 37794

Chemical and physical data
- Formula: C_{13}H_{16}N_{2}
- Molar mass: 200.285 g·mol^{−1}
- 3D model (JSmol): Interactive image
- SMILES: C1CC1NCCC2=CNC3=CC=CC=C32
- InChI: InChI=1S/C13H16N2/c1-2-4-13-12(3-1)10(9-15-13)7-8-14-11-5-6-11/h1-4,9,11,14-15H,5-8H2; Key:VYIORSRXNBGASE-UHFFFAOYSA-N

N-Cyclopropyltryptamine (NcPT) is a monoamine oxidase inhibitor (MAOI) of the tryptamine family related to N-methyltryptamine (NMT).

It is a potent MAOI, with greater activity than pargyline (56–67% inhibition at 100 nM versus 41% inhibition at 100 nM, respectively). The drug markedly potentiates the behavioral effects of 5-hydroxytryptophan (5-HTP) in rodents. In addition, it produces tremors, hypolocomotion, motor incoordination, and vasodilation in rodents. NcPT has also been reported to have antihyperglycemic activity. The drug has not been assessed in terms of psychedelic-related behavioral effects.

The chemical synthesis of NcPT has been described. Some notable derivatives of NcPT include 5-MeO-NcPT, 7-MeO-NcPT, 5,6-DiMeO-NcPT, and 6,7-DiMeO-NcPT, which showed MAOI activity similarly to NcPT. Some other derivatives include the psychedelic designer drugs N-methyl-N-cyclopropyltryptamine (McPT), 4-HO-McPT, and 4-AcO-McPT.

NcPT was first described in the scientific literature by 1975.

== See also ==
- Substituted tryptamine
