= Z5247692566 =

Clinical data
- Drug class: Serotonin 5-HT_{2A} receptor agonist
- ATC code: None

Identifiers
- IUPAC name: 4-[(3,3-dimethyloxolan-2-yl)methyl]-3-[(1H-indol-3-yl)methyl]morpholine

Chemical and physical data
- Formula: C_{20}H_{28}N_{2}O_{2}
- Molar mass: 328.456 g·mol^{−1}
- 3D model (JSmol): Interactive image
- SMILES: CC1(C)CCOC1CN1CCOCC1Cc1c[NH]c2ccccc21
- InChI: InChI=InChI=1S/C20H28N2O2/c1-20(2)7-9-24-19(20)13-22-8-10-23-14-16(22)11-15-12-21-18-6-4-3-5-17(15)18/h3-6,12,16,19,21H,7-11,13-14H2,1-2H3; Key:MWTNBIGFALLYOU-UHFFFAOYSA-N

Z5247692566 (Z2566) is a tryptamine derivative which acts as a serotonin 5-HT_{2A} receptor agonist. It was discovered from a molecule docking screen against the AlphaFold model of the 5-HT_{2A} receptor. It has two stereogenic centres and four possible isomers, but it is unclear which of these is the active isomer that was docked against 5-HT_{2A}.

== See also ==
- Cyclized tryptamine
- List of miscellaneous 5-HT_{2A} receptor agonists
- Ultra-large-scale docking
- DMBMPP
- Lucigenol
- MPMI (drug)
