= 4-HO-MBT =

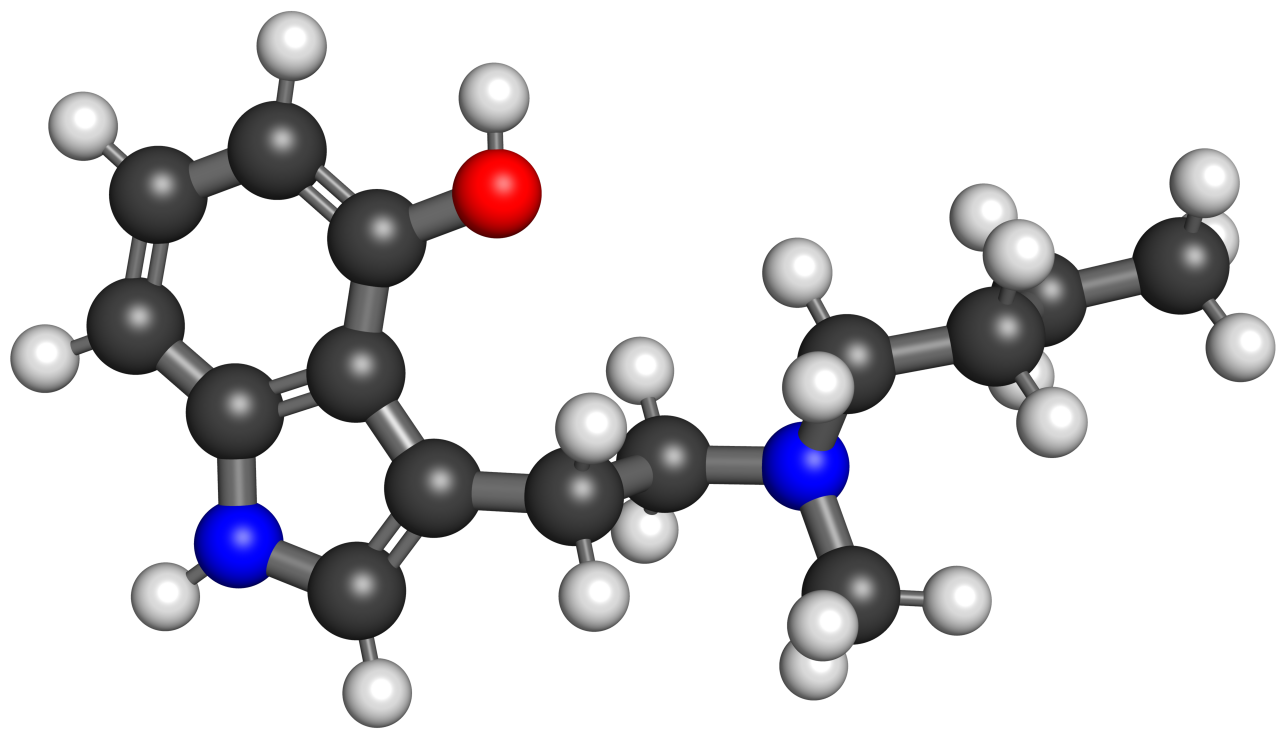

Clinical data
- Other names: 4-OH-MBT; 4-Hydroxy-N-methyl-N-butyltryptamine
- ATC code: None

Identifiers
- IUPAC name: 3-[2-[butyl(methyl)amino]ethyl]-1H-indol-4-ol
- PubChem CID: 21786587
- ChemSpider: 10513077

Chemical and physical data
- Formula: C_{15}H_{22}N_{2}O
- Molar mass: 246.354 g·mol^{−1}
- 3D model (JSmol): Interactive image
- SMILES: CCCCN(C)CCC1=CNC2=C1C(=CC=C2)O
- InChI: InChI=1S/C15H22N2O/c1-3-4-9-17(2)10-8-12-11-16-13-6-5-7-14(18)15(12)13/h5-7,11,16,18H,3-4,8-10H2,1-2H3; Key:CVGNGEGPBYQCMP-UHFFFAOYSA-N

4-HO-MBT, also known as 4-hydroxy-N-methyl-N-butyltryptamine, is a chemical compound of the tryptamine and 4-hydroxytryptamine families related to the psychedelic drug psilocin (4-HO-DMT).

== Use and effects ==
4-HO-MBT was briefly described by Alexander Shulgin in his book TiHKAL (Tryptamines I Have Known and Loved), but was not tested by him and its properties and effects are unknown.

== Chemistry ==
=== Isomers ===
There are four possible isomers of 4-HO-MBT, with the others including 4-HO-MiBT, 4-HO-MsBT, and 4-HO-MtBT. Of these, only 4-HO-MtBT has been tested as a possible psychedelic drug. According to Alexander Shulgin in his book TiHKAL (Tryptamines I Have Known and Loved), a dose of 15 mg 4-HO-MtBT orally produced virtually no effects. Higher doses were not explored.

=== Analogues ===
Analogues of 4-HO-MBT include methylbutyltryptamine (MBT), 4-HO-MET (metocin), 4-HO-MPT (meprocin), psilocin (4-HO-DMT), and 4-HO-DBT, among others.

== History ==
4-HO-MBT was first described in the scientific literature by David Repke and colleagues in 1981. It was further described by Alexander Shulgin in his 1997 book TiHKAL (Tryptamines I Have Known and Loved).

== See also ==
- Substituted tryptamine
