= AHR-1229 =

Clinical data
- Other names: AHR1229; N-Butyl-N-(1-phenylpyrrolidin-4-yl)tryptamine; 3-[2-(3-Indolyl-)ethyl]butylamino-1-phenylpyrrolidine
- ATC code: None

Identifiers
- IUPAC name: N-butyl-N-[2-(1H-indol-3-yl)ethyl]-1-phenylpyrrolidin-3-amine
- PubChem CID: 86175355
- ChemSpider: 57478198

Chemical and physical data
- Formula: C_{24}H_{31}N_{3}
- Molar mass: 361.533 g·mol^{−1}
- 3D model (JSmol): Interactive image
- SMILES: CCCCN(CCC1=CNC2=CC=CC=C21)C3CCN(C3)C4=CC=CC=C4
- InChI: InChI=1S/C24H31N3/c1-2-3-15-26(16-13-20-18-25-24-12-8-7-11-23(20)24)22-14-17-27(19-22)21-9-5-4-6-10-21/h4-12,18,22,25H,2-3,13-17,19H2,1H3; Key:CDYYGETYBLUMPO-UHFFFAOYSA-N

AHR-1229, also known as N-butyl-N-(1-phenylpyrrolidin-4-yl)tryptamine, is a drug of the tryptamine family which was studied as a possible dopamine antagonist. It increases alertness and produces "small repetitive head movements" in rodents, effects said to be indicative of behavioral excitation, whereas it modestly antagonizes intra-accumbens dopamine-induced hyperlocomotion. Conversely, the drug did not produce catalepsy, did not affect amphetamine-induced lethality, did not affect prolactin levels, and did not displace spiperone binding to dopamine receptors. AHR-1229 was first described in the scientific literature by 1983.

== See also ==
- Substituted tryptamine
