= Substituted tryptamine =

Class of indoles

The structure of substituted tryptamines. Tryptamine itself is obtained when R4=R5=RN_{1}=RN_{2}=Rα = H.

The structure of substituted tryptamines with all positions labeled.

Substituted tryptamines, or simply tryptamines, also known as serotonin analogues (i.e., 5-hydroxytryptamine analogues), are organic compounds which may be thought of as being derived from tryptamine itself. The molecular structures of all tryptamines contain an indole ring system, joined to an amino (NH_{2}) group via an ethyl (−CH2–CH2−) sidechain. In substituted tryptamines, the indole ring, sidechain, and/or amino group are modified by substituting another group for one of the hydrogen (H) atoms.

Well-known tryptamines include serotonin, an important neurotransmitter, and melatonin, a hormone involved in regulating the sleep-wake cycle. Tryptamine alkaloids are found in fungi, plants and animals; and sometimes used by humans for the neurological or psychotropic effects of the substance. Prominent examples of tryptamine alkaloids include psilocybin (from "psilocybin mushrooms") and DMT. In South America, dimethyltryptamine is obtained from numerous plant sources, like chacruna, and it is often used in ayahuasca brews. Many synthetic tryptamines have also been made, including the migraine drug sumatriptan, and psychedelic drugs. A 2022 study has found the variety of tryptamines present in wild mushrooms may affect the therapeutic impact.

The tryptamine structure, in particular its indole ring, may be part of the structure of some more complex compounds, for example cyclized tryptamines like LSD, ibogaine, harmaline, mitragynine and yohimbine. A thorough investigation of dozens of tryptamine compounds was published by Alexander Shulgin and Ann Shulgin in 1997 under the title TiHKAL (Tryptamines I Have Known and Loved).

== Use and effects ==
The doses, potencies, durations, and effects of psychedelic tryptamines have been reviewed by Alexander Shulgin and other authors.

=== Ring-unsubstituted tryptamines ===
Oral doses and durations of ring-unsubstituted tryptamines
Compound	Chemical name	Dose	Duration
Tryptamine (T)	Tryptamine	>100 mg^{a}	–
NMT	N-Methyltryptamine	Unknown^{b}	–
NET	N-Ethyltryptamine	Unknown	Unknown
NPT	N-Propyltryptamine	Unknown	Unknown
NiPT	N-Isopropyltryptamine	Unknown	Unknown
NsBT	N-sec-Butyltryptamine	25–75 mg	"Short"
NtBT	N-tert-Butyltryptamine	5–20 mg	Unknown
NAT	N-Amyltryptamine	>100 mg	–
NHT	N-Hexyltryptamine	>100 mg	–
DMT	N,N-Dimethyltryptamine	>350–1,000 mg^{c}	–
DET	N,N-Diethyltryptamine	50–150 mg	2–4 hours
DPT	N,N-Dipropyltryptamine	100–250 mg	2–4 hours
DiPT	N,N-Diisopropyltryptamine	25–100 mg (15–150 mg+)	4–8 hours
DALT	N,N-Diallyltryptamine	60–80 mg	<3 hours
DBT	N,N-Dibutyltryptamine	≥100 mg	Unknown
DAT	N,N-Diamyltryptamine	Unknown	Unknown
DHT	N,N-Dihexyltryptamine	>100 mg	–
MET	N-Methyl-N-ethyltryptamine	80–100 mg	Unknown
MPT	N-Methyl-N-propyltryptamine	>50 mg	Unknown
MiPT	N-Methyl-N-isopropyltryptamine	10–25 mg	3–4 hours
MALT	N-Methyl-N-allyltryptamine	25–50 mg	Unknown
MBT	N-Methyl-N-butyltryptamine	250–400 mg	4–6 hours
MsBT	N-Methyl-N-sec-butyltryptamine	250–400 mg	Unknown
EPT	N-Ethyl-N-propyltryptamine	Unknown	Unknown
EiPT	N-Ethyl-N-isopropyltryptamine	24–40 mg	4–6 hours
PiPT	N-Propyl-N-isopropyltryptamine	Unknown	Unknown
Pyr-T	N,N-Tetramethylenetryptamine	Unknown	Unknown
Pip-T	N,N-Pentamethylenetryptamine	Unknown	Unknown
Mor-T	3-(2-Morpholinoethyl)indole	Unknown^{d}	Unknown
Footnotes: ^{a} = Tryptamine is not orally active, but is active intravenously at a dose of 250 mg with a very short duration. ^{b} = NMT is not orally active, but is said to be active smoked at a dose of 50 to 120 mg with a duration of seconds to minutes. Also reportedly orally active with an MAOI. ^{c} = DMT is active parenterally at doses of 50 to 100 mg (2–100 mg) smoked, intramuscularly, or subcutaneously and at doses of 4 to 30 mg intravenously (bolus), with a duration of <1 hour or 5–20 minutes. For continuous intravenous infusion, the dose is 0.6 to 2.4 mg/minute. Also orally active with an MAOI (as in ayahuasca or pharmahuasca), with a typical dose of 50 mg (range 20–120 mg) and a duration of 4 to 6 hours. ^{d} = Mor-T was inactive at a dose of 30 mg by intramuscular injection. Refs: Individual:

=== 4-Hydroxytryptamines ===
Oral doses and durations of 4-hydroxytryptamines
Compound	Chemical name	Dose	Duration
4-HT (4-HO-T)	4-Hydroxytryptamine	Unknown	Unknown
Norbaeocystin (4-PO-T)	4-Phosphoryloxytryptamine	Unknown	Unknown
Norpsilocin (4-HO-NMT)	4-Hydroxy-N-methyltryptamine	Unknown	Unknown
Baeocystin (4-PO-NMT)	4-Phosphoryloxy-N-methyltryptamine	4–10 mg^{a}	Unknown
Psilocin (4-HO-DMT)	4-Hydroxy-N,N-dimethyltryptamine	10–20 mg (5–40 mg+)	3–6 hours
Psilocybin (4-PO-DMT)	4-Phosphoryloxy-N,N-dimethyltryptamine	10–20 mg (5–40 mg+)	3–6 hours
4-AcO-DMT (psilacetin)	4-Acetoxy-N,N-dimethyltryptamine	10–30 mg	3–8 hours
4-PrO-DMT	4-Propionyloxy-N,N-dimethyltryptamine	Unknown	Unknown
4-HO-DET (ethocin)	4-Hydroxy-N,N-diethyltryptamine	10–25 mg	4–6 hours
Ethocybin (4-PO-DET)	4-Phosphoryloxy-N,N-diethyltryptamine	15–30 mg	4–6 hours
4-HO-DPT (deprocin)	4-Hydroxy-N,N-dipropyltryptamine	>20 mg	5–8 hours
4-HO-DiPT (iprocin)	4-Hydroxy-N,N-diisopropyltryptamine	12–20 mg (3–30 mg+)	2–3 hours
4-AcO-DiPT (ipracetin)	4-Acetoxy-N,N-diisopropyltryptamine	6–10 mg	Unknown
Luvesilocin (4-GO-DiPT)	4-Glutaryloxy-N,N-diisopropyltryptamine	Unknown^{b}	Unknown^{b}
4-HO-DALT (daltocin)	4-Hydroxy-N,N-diallyltryptamine	Unknown	Unknown
4-HO-DBT	4-Hydroxy-N,N-dibutyltryptamine	>20 mg	Unknown
4-HO-DiBT	4-Hydroxy-N,N-diisobutyltryptamine	>20 mg	Unknown
4-HO-DtBT	4-HydroxyN,N-di-tert-butyltryptamine	Unknown	Unknown
4-HO-MET (metocin)	4-Hydroxy-N-methyl-N-ethyltryptamine	10–20 mg (2–45 mg+)	4–6 hours
4-HO-MPT (meprocin)	4-Hydroxy-N-methyl-N-propyltryptamine	8–30 mg	Unknown
4-HO-MiPT (miprocin)	4-Hydroxy-N-methyl-N-isopropyltryptamine	12–25 mg (6–30 mg)	4–6 hours
4-HO-MALT (maltocin)	4-Hydorxy-N-methyl-N-allyltryptamine	Unknown	Unknown
4-HO-MtBT	4-Hydroxy-N-methyl-N-tert-butyltryptamine	>15 mg	Unknown
4-HO-EPT (eprocin)	4-Hydroxy-N-ethyl-N-propyltryptamine	Unknown	Unknown
4-HO-EiPT	4-Hydroxy-N-ethyl-N-isopropyltryptamine	Unknown	Unknown
4-HO-PiPT (piprocin)	4-Hydroxy-N-propyl-N-isopropyltryptamine	Unknown	Unknown
4-HO-TMT	4-Hydroxy-N,N,N-trimethyltryptamine	Unknown	Unknown
Aeruginascin (4-PO-TMT)	4-Phosphoryloxy-N,N,N-trimethyltryptamine	Unknown	Unknown
4-HO-pyr-T	4-Hydroxy-N,N-tetramethylenetryptamine	>20 mg	Unknown
Footnotes: ^{a} = Baeocystin has conflicting reports, some say that it's active and some say that it's inactive. ^{b} = Luvesilocin is known to be active subcutaneously at doses of 5 to 40 mg with an average duration of 3.6 hours. Refs: Individual:

=== 5-Hydroxytryptamines ===
Oral doses and durations of 5-hydroxytryptamines
Compound	Chemical name	Dose	Duration
Serotonin (5-HT, 5-HO-T)	5-Hydroxytryptamine	>100 mg^{a}	–
N-Methylserotonin (norbufotenin; 5-HO-NMT)	5-Hydroxy-N-methyltryptamine	Unknown	Unknown
Bufotenin (5-HO-DMT)	5-Hydroxy-N,N-dimethyltryptamine	>100 mg^{b}	–
O-Acetylbufotenin (5-AcO-DMT)	5-Acetoxy-N,N-dimethyltryptamine	Unknown	Unknown
O-Pivalylbufotenin (5-t-BuCO-DMT)	5-Pivaloxy-N,N-dimethyltryptamine	Unknown	Unknown
5-HO-DET	5-Hydroxy-N,N-diethyltryptamine	Unknown	Unknown
5-HO-DPT (DiPS, NDPS)	5-Hydroxy-N,N-dipropyltryptamine	Unknown	Unknown
5-HO-DiPT	5-Hydroxy-N,N-diisopropyltryptamine	Unknown	Unknown
5-HO-MET	5-Hydroxy-N-methyl-N-ethyltryptamine	Unknown	Unknown
Footnotes: ^{a} = Serotonin does not cross the blood–brain barrier and is not psychoactive. ^{b} = Bufotenin is not orally active, but is active intravenously at doses of 8 to 16 mg with a duration of 1 to 2 hours and is active via insufflation and other parenteral routes. Refs: Individual:

=== 5-Methoxytryptamines ===
Oral doses and durations of 5-methoxytryptamines
Compound	Chemical name	Dose	Duration
5-MT (5-MeO-T)	5-Methoxytryptamine	Unknown	Unknown
5-MeO-NMT	5-Methoxy-N-methyltryptamine	Unknown	Unknown
5-MeO-NET	5-Methoxy-N-ethyltryptamine	Unknown	Unknown
5-MeO-NiPT	5-Methoxy-N-isopropyltryptamine	Unknown	Unknown
5-MeO-DMT (mebufotenin)	5-Methoxy-N,N-dimethyltryptamine	>35 mg^{a}	–
5-MeO-DET	5-Methoxy-N,N-diethyltryptamine	1–3 mg	3–4 hours
5-MeO-DPT	5-Methoxy-N,N-dipropyltryptamine	6–10 mg	2–4 hours
5-MeO-DiPT	5-Methoxy-N,N-diisopropyltryptamine	6–12 mg	4–8 hours
5-MeO-DALT	5-Methoxy-N,N-diallyltryptamine	12–25 mg	2–4 hours
5-MeO-DBT	5-Methoxy-N,N-dibutyltryptamine	Unknown	Unknown
5-MeO-DsBT	5-Methoxy-N,N-di-sec-butyltryptamine	Unknown	Unknown
5-MeO-MET	5-Methoxy-N-methyl-N-ethyltryptamine	Unknown	Unknown
5-MeO-MPT	5-Methoxy-N-methyl-N-propyltryptamine	Unknown	Unknown
5-MeO-MiPT	5-Methoxy-N-methyl-N-isopropyltryptamine	4–6 mg (0.5–20 mg+)	4–6 hours
5-MeO-MALT	5-Methoxy-N-methyl-N-allyltryptamine	Unknown	Unknown
5-MeO-MsBT	5-Methoxy-N-methyl-N-sec-butyltryptamine	10–30 mg	3–4 hours
5-MeO-EPT	5-Methoxy-N-ethyl-N-propyltryptamine	Unknown	Unknown
5-MeO-EiPT	5-Methoxy-N-ethyl-N-isopropyltryptamine	Unknown	Unknown
5-MeO-PiPT	5-Methoxy-N-propyl-N-isopropyltryptamine	Unknown	Unknown
5-MeO-iPALT (ASR-3001)	5-Methoxy-N-isopropyl-N-allyltryptamine	8–14 mg	1.5–2.5 hours
5-MeO-pyr-T	5-Methoxy-N,N-tetramethylenetryptamine	0.5–2 mg	Several hours
Melatonin (5-MeO-NAcT)	5-Methoxy-N-acetyltryptamine	1–10 mg^{b}	A few hours
Footnotes: ^{a} = 5-MeO-DMT is not orally active, but is active at a dose of 2 to 20 mg smoked or 2 to 3 mg intravenously, with a duration of 5 to 20 minutes. Also orally active with an MAOI at doses of 10 to 25 mg. ^{b} = Melatonin is not a psychedelic but a hypnotic and is non-hallucinogenic at doses of up to 1,200 mg. Refs: Individual:

=== α-Alkyltryptamines ===
Oral doses and durations of α-alkyltryptamines
Compound	Chemical name	Dose	Duration
AMT (α-methyl-T; Indopan)^{a}	α-Methyltryptamine	15–40 mg	12–16 hours
AET (α-ethyl-T; etryptamine; Monase)^{b}	α-Ethyltryptamine	100–160 mg	6–8 hours
α,N-DMT (N-methyl-AMT)^{c}	α-Methyl-N-methyltryptamine	50–100 mg	6–8 hours
α,N,N-TMT (N,N-dimethyl-AMT)	α,N,N-Trimethyltryptamine	Unknown^{d}	Unknown
2,α-DMT (2-methyl-AMT)	2-Methyl-α-methyltryptamine	300–500 mg	7–10 hours
4-HO-AMT (MP-14)	4-Hydroxy-α-methyltryptamine	15–20 mg+	Unknown
4-Methyl-AMT (MP-809)	4-Methyl-α-methyltryptamine	20–60 mg+	Unknown
5-Fluoro-AMT (PAL-212, PAL-544)	5-Fluoro-α-methyltryptamine	25 mg+	>9 hours
5-Chloro-AMT (PAL-542)	5-Chloro-α-methyltryptamine	Unknown	Unknown
5-Fluoro-AET (PAL-545)	5-Fluoro-α-ethyltryptamine	Unknown	Unknown
5-Chloro-AET (PAL-526)	5-Chloro-α-ethyltryptamine	Unknown	Unknown
6-Fluoro-AMT	6-Fluoro-α-methyltryptamine	25–75 mg	"Long"
α-Methylserotonin (AMS; 5-HO-AMT)	α-Methyl-5-hydroxytryptamine	Unknown	Unknown
α,O-DMS (5-MeO-AMT)	α-Methyl-5-methoxytryptamine	2.5–5 mg (0.5–15 mg)	12–18 hours
α,N,O-TMS (5-MeO-N-methyl-AMT)	α-Methyl-5-methoxy-N-methyltryptamine	10–20 mg	6–8 hours
α,N,N,O-TeMS (5-MeO-N,N-dimethyl-AMT)	5-Methoxy-α,N,N-trimethyltryptamine	Unknown	Unknown
5-MeO-AET	α-Ethyl-5-methoxytryptamine	~70 mg	Several hours
Bk-NM-AMT (β-keto-N-methyl-AMT)^{e}	α-Methyl-β-keto-N-methyltryptamine	Unknown	Unknown
Footnotes: ^{a} = AMT is a not only a psychedelic but is also a stimulant and entactogen. ^{b} = AET is an entactogen and stimulant and is not a psychedelic. ^{c} = α,N-DMT is a stimulant and is not a psychedelic or entactogen. ^{d} = α,N,N-TMT has been reported to be an active psychedelic orally but to be much less potent than AMT. ^{e} = Bk-NM-AMT is expected to be an entactogen and stimulant but not a psychedelic. Refs: Individual:

=== Other tryptamines ===
Oral doses and durations of other tryptamines
Compound	Chemical name	Dose	Duration
Lespedamine (1-MeO-DMT)	1-Methoxy-N,N-dimethyltryptamine	Unknown	Unknown
2-Methyl-DMT	2-Methyl-N,N-dimethyltryptamine	50–100 mg	4–6 hours
2-Methyl-DET	2-Methyl-N,N-diethyltryptamine	80–120 mg	6–8 hours
4-MeO-DMT	4-Methoxy-N,N-dimethyltryptamine	Unknown	Unknown
4-MeO-DET	4-Methoxy-N,N-diethyltryptamine	>30 mg	Unknown
4-MeO-DiPT	4-Methoxy-N,N-diisopropyltryptamine	Unknown	Unknown
4-MeO-MiPT	4-Methoxy-N-methyl-N-isopropyltryptamines	20–30 mg	4–6 hours
4,5-MDO-DMT	4,5-Methylenedioxy-N,N-dimethyltryptamine	Unknown	Unknown
4,5-MDO-DiPT	4,5-Methylenedioxy-N,N-diisopropyltryptamine	>25 mg	Unknown
5-Fluoro-DMT	5-Fluoro-N,N-dimethyltryptamine	Unknown	Unknown
5-Chloro-DMT	5-Chloro-N,N-dimethyltryptamine	Unknown	Unknown
5-Bromo-DMT	5-Bromo-N,N-dimethyltryptamine	Unknown^{a}	Unknown
Bretisilocin (5-fluoro-MET)	5-Fluoro-N-methyl-N-ethyltryptamine	Unknown^{b}	Unknown^{b}
5-MeO-2-TMT	5-Methoxy-2-methyl-N,N-dimethyltryptamine	75–150 mg	5–10 hours
5-MeS-DMT	5-Methylthio-N,N-dimethyltryptamine	Unknown^{c}	Unknown^{c}
5,6-MeO-MiPT	5,6-Dimethoxy-N-methyl-N-isopropyltryptamine	>75 mg	Unknown
5,6-MDO-DMT	5,6-Methylenedioxy-N,N-dimethyltryptamine	>5 mg	Unknown
5,6-MDO-DiPT	5,6-Methylenedioxy-N,N-diisopropyltryptamine	Unknown	Unknown
5,6-MDO-MiPT	5,6-Methylenedioxy-N-methyl-N-isopropyltryptamine	>50–60 mg	Unknown
6-Fluoro-DMT	6-Fluoro-N,N-dimethyltryptamine	Unknown	Unknown
6-Fluoro-DET	6-Fluoro-N,N-diethyltryptamine	>80 mg	Unknown
6-HO-DMT	6-Hydroxy-N,N-dimethyltryptamine	>80 mg	Unknown
6-HO-DET	6-Hydroxy-N,N-diethyltryptamine	≥10 mg^{d}	3–4 hours^{d}
6-MeO-DMT	6-Methoxy-N,N-dimethyltryptamine	Unknown	Unknown
6-MeO-DiPT	6-Methoxy-N,N-diisopropyltryptamine	>50 mg	Unknown
6-MeO-MiPT	6-Methoxy-N-methyl-N-isopropyltryptamine	>50 mg	Unknown
7-HO-DMT	7-Hydroxy-N,N-dimethyltryptamine	Unknown	Unknown
7-MeO-DMT	7-Methoxy-N,N-dimethyltryptamine	Unknown	Unknown
7-MeO-DiPT	7-Methoxy-N,N-diisopropyltryptamine	>70 mg	Unknown
7-MeO-MiPT	7-Methoxy-N-methyl-N-isopropyltryptamine	>70 mg	Unknown
Footnotes: ^{a} = 5-Bromo-DMT is active via smoking at a dose of 20 to 50 mg. ^{b} = Bretisilocin is active intravenously with a dose range of 10 to 20 mg and a duration of 60 to 90 minutes. ^{c} = 5-MeS-DMT's oral dose and duration are unknown, but smoked the dose is 15 to 30 mg and the duration is 10 to 30 minutes or <1 hour. ^{d} = Controversial and uncertain. Refs: Individual:

== Pharmacology ==
=== Pharmacodynamics ===
Serotonin receptor affinities (K_{i}, nM) of selected psychedelic tryptamines (Jain et al., 2025)
Compound	5-HT_{1A}	5-HT_{1B}	5-HT_{1D}	5-HT_{1E}	5-HT_{2A}	5-HT_{2B}	5-HT_{2C}	5-HT_{3}	5-HT_{5A}	5-HT_{6}	5-HT_{7}	SERT
DMT	269	447	117	380	380	112	257	–	2,090	275	69	2,400
Psilocin	372	191	98	339	200	25	245	–	447	79	87	2,570
Psilocybin	5,250	–	195	–	851	479	3,090	–	–	776	–	–
4-AcO-MALT	977	–	871	417	692	25	631	–	–	661	794	3,090
Bufotenin	8.3	59	22	25	224	6.2	209	166	302	18	8.9	1,120
5-MeO-DMT	10	91	21	575	200	15	490	–	589	25	4.4	–
5-MeO-DiPT	170	–	871	–	324	46	–	–	–	2,190	–	–
5-MeO-DALT	17	1,020	54	977	457	100	2,240	–	–	162	60	4,470
5-MeO-EiPT	54	1,170	174	–	1,622	98	–	–	–	407	661	5,620
LSD	5.9	21	3.5	135	8.5	5.5	17	–	1.8	16	8.5	–

Serotonin receptor affinities (K_{i}, nM) of selected psychedelic tryptamines (Ray, 2010)
Compound	5-HT_{1A}	5-HT_{1B}	5-HT_{1D}	5-HT_{1E}	5-HT_{2A}	5-HT_{2B}	5-HT_{2C}	5-HT_{3}	5-HT_{5A}	5-HT_{6}	5-HT_{7}	SERT
DMT	>10,000	>10,000	93	456	2,323	108	335	>10,000	611	487	883	3,742
DPT	32	854	619	2,338	2,579	42	1,567	>10,000	4,373	4,543	284	157
DiPT	121	>10,000	3,742	>10,000	>10,000	399	>10,000	>10,000	>10,000	>10,000	3,423	1,258
Psilocin	63	305	19	44	340	4.7	141	>10,000	70	72	72	852
5-MeO-DMT	1.9	74	6.3	360	2,011	3,884	538	>10,000	277	36	3.9	2,032
5-MeO-DiPT	132	5,137	1,718	>10,000	>10,000	163	>10,000	>10,000	>10,000	>10,000	1,231	2,531
5-MeO-MiPT	12	303	23	3,496	448	59	2,186	>10,000	953	130	20	6,409
6-Fluoro-DMT	393	218	55	461	866	30	674	>10,000	961	26	41	145
5-MeO-2-TMT	200	>10,000	250	1,800	>10,000	?	4,020	?	10,450	60	145	>10,000
EMDT	170	>10,000	290	520	>10,000	?	1,810	?	4,620	16	300	>10,000
Ibogaine	>10,000	>10,000	>10,000	?	14,142	?	>10,000	>10,000	?	?	?	549
LSD	7.3	3.9	7.8	93	11	30	31	>10,000	9	6.9	6.6	>10,000

== Chemistry ==
=== Synthesis ===
The chemical syntheses of numerous tryptamines have been described by Alexander Shulgin in his book TiHKAL (Tryptamines I Have Known and Loved). A well-known and widely used synthetic approach for making tryptamines is the Speeter–Anthony route, which starts with indole. Other tryptamine synthesis routes have also been described, for instance starting with tryptamine rather than indole. The chemical syntheses of the psychedelic tryptamines bufotenin (5-HO-DMT) and 5-MeO-DMT (mebufotenin) have been comprehensively reviewed.

== List of substituted tryptamines ==
Structure	Name	Origin	Ring sub.	R^{N1}	R^{N2}	Chemical name	CAS #
	Tryptamine (T)	Animals, plants, fungi	H	H	H	3-(2-aminoethyl)indole / 2-(1H-indol-3-yl)ethanamine	61-54-1
	N-Methyltryptamine (NMT)	Plants	H	H	CH_{3}	N-methyltryptamine	61-49-4
	2-HO-NMT	Plants	2-OH	H	CH_{3}	2-hydroxy-N-methyltryptamine	106987-89-7
	5-MeO-NMT	Plants	5-OCH_{3}	H	CH_{3}	5-methoxy-N-methyltryptamine	2009-03-2
	Serotonin (5-HT)	Animals, plants	5-OH	H	H	5-hydroxytryptamine	50-67-9
	N-Methylserotonin (NMS; norbufotenin; 5-HO-NMT)	Plants	5-OH	H	CH_{3}	5-hydroxy-N-methyltryptamine	1134-01-6
	Bufotenin (5-HO-DMT)	Animals, plants, fungi	5-OH	CH_{3}	CH_{3}	5-hydroxy-N,N-dimethyltryptamine	487-93-4
	Bufotenidine (5-HTQ)	Amphibians	5-O^{−}	(CH_{3})_{3}		3-[2-(trimethylazaniumyl)ethyl]-1H-indol-5-olate	487-91-2
	Bufoviridine (5-SO-DMT)	Amphibians	5-SO	CH_{3}	CH_{3}	5-sulfooxy-N,N-dimethyltryptamine	16369-08-7
	5-Methoxytryptamine (5-MT; 5-MeO-T)	Animals, plants	5-OCH_{3}	H	H	5-methoxytryptamine	608-07-1
	Melatonin (5-MeO-NAcT)	Animals, plants, microbes	5-OCH_{3}	H	O=C-CH_{3}	5-methoxy-N-acetyltryptamine	73-31-4
	N-Acetylserotonin (NAS; normelatonin; 5-HO-NAcT)	Animals	5-OH	H	O=C-CH_{3}	5-hydroxy-N-acetyltryptamine	1210-83-9
	6-Hydroxymelatonin	Animals	5-OCH_{3}, 6-OH	H	O=C-CH_{3}	N-[2-(6-Hydroxy-5-methoxy-1H-indol-3-yl)ethyl]acetamide	2208-41-5
	4-Hydroxytryptamine (4-HT)	Fungi	4-OH	H	H	4-hydroxytryptamine	570-14-9
	4-HO-NMT	Fungi	4-OH	H	CH_{3}	4-hydroxy-N-methyltryptamine	28363-70-4
	Psilocin (4-HO-DMT)	Fungi	4-OH	CH_{3}	CH_{3}	4-hydroxy-N,N-dimethyltryptamine	520-53-6
	4-HO-TMT	Fungi	4-OH	CH_{3}	CH_{3}	4-hydroxy-N,N,N-trimethyltryptammonium	262285-41-6
	Norbaeocystin (4-PO-T)	Fungi	4-OPO_{3}H_{2}	H	H	4-phosphoryloxy-tryptamine	21420-59-7
	Baeocystin (4-PO-NMT)	Fungi	4-OPO_{3}H_{2}	H	CH_{3}	4-phosphoryloxy-N-methyl-tryptamine	21420-58-6
	Psilocybin (4-PO-DMT)	Fungi	4-OPO_{3}H_{2}	CH_{3}	CH_{3}	4-phosphoryloxy-N,N-dimethyltryptamine	520-52-5
	Aeruginascin (4-PO-TMT)	Fungi	4-OPO_{3}H_{2}	(CH_{3})_{3}		[3-[2-(trimethylazaniumyl)ethyl]-1H-indol-4-yl] hydrogen phosphate	114264-95-8
	Dimethyltryptamine (DMT)	Animals, plants	H	CH_{3}	CH_{3}	N,N-dimethyltryptamine	61-50-7
	Lespedamine (1-MeO-DMT)	Plants	1-OCH_{3}	CH_{3}	CH_{3}	1-methoxy-N,N-dimethyltryptamine	4335-93-7
	5-MeO-DMT (mebufotenin)	Animals, plants	5-OCH_{3}	CH_{3}	CH_{3}	5-methoxy-N,N-dimethyltryptamine	1019-45-0
	5-Bromo-DMT	Marine sponges, invertebrates	5-Br	CH_{3}	CH_{3}	5-bromo-N,N-dimethyltryptamine	17274-65-6
	6-Bromotryptamine	Marine invertebrates	6-Br	H	H	6-bromotryptamine	96624-18-9
	5,6-Dibromotryptamine	Marine invertebrates	5,6-Br	H	H	5,6-dibromotryptamine	
	5,6-Dibromo-NMT	Marine invertebrates	5,6-Br	H	CH_{3}	5,6-dibromo-N-methyltryptamine	
	5,6-Dibromo-DMT	Marine sponges, invertebrates	5,6-Br	CH_{3}	CH_{3}	5,6-dibromo-N,N-dimethyltryptamine	72853-80-6
	Desformylflustrabromine (dFBr)	Marine invertebrates	2-(α,α-dimethylallyl), 6-Br	H	CH_{3}	2-[6-bromo-2-(2-methylbut-3-en-2-yl)-1H-indol-3-yl]-N-methylethanamine	474657-72-2
	Convolutindole A	Marine invertebrates	2,4,6-Br, 1,7-OCH_{3}	CH_{3}	CH_{3}	1,7-dimethoxy-2,4,6-tribromo-N,N-dimethyltryptamine	443356-86-3
	α,α-Dideuterotryptamine	artificial	H	H	H	α,α-Dideuterotryptamine	?
	β,β-Dideuterotryptamine	artificial	H	H	H	β,β-Dideuterotryptamine	?
	1-Methyltryptamine (1-MT)	artificial	1-CH_{3}	H	H	1-Methyltryptamine	7518-21-0
	4-Methoxytryptamine (4-MeO-T)	artificial	4-OCH_{3}	H	H	4-Methoxytryptamine	3610-35-3
	4-Fluorotryptamine (4-FT)	artificial	4-F	H	H	4-Fluorotryptamine	467452-26-2
	5-Methoxytryptamine-α,α,β,β-d4 (5-MT-d4)	artificial	5-OCH_{3}	H	H	α,α,β,β-Tetradeutero-5-methoxytryptamine	96236-05-4
	5-Methyltryptamine (5-MT)	artificial	5-CH_{3}	H	H	5-Methyltryptamine	1821-47-2
	5-Fluorotryptamine (5-FT)	artificial	5-F	H	H	5-Fluorotryptamine	576-16-9
	5-Chlorotryptamine (5-Cl-T)	artificial	5-Cl	H	H	5-Chlorotryptamine	3764-94-1
	5-Bromotryptamine (5-Br-T)	artificial	5-Br	H	H	5-Bromotryptamine	3610-42-2
	6-Methyltryptamine (6-MT)	artificial	6-CH_{3}	H	H	6-Methyltryptamine	62500-90-7
	6-Hydroxytryptamine (6-HT)	artificial	6-OH	H	H	6-Hydroxytryptamine	443-31-2
	6-Methoxytryptamine (6-MeO-T)	artificial	6-OCH_{3}	H	H	6-Methoxytryptamine	3610-36-4
	6-Fluorotryptamine (6-FT)	artificial	6-F	H	H	6-Fluorotryptamine	575-85-9
	7-Methyltryptamine (7-MT)	artificial	7-CH_{3}	H	H	7-Methyltryptamine	14490-05-2
	7-Hydroxytryptamine (7-HT)	artificial	7-OH	H	H	7-Hydroxytryptamine	15700-23-9
	7-Methoxytryptamine (7-MeO-T)	artificial	7-OCH_{3}	H	H	7-Methoxytryptamine	2436-04-6
	7-Fluorotryptamine (7-F-T)	artificial	7-F	H	H	7-Fluorotryptamine	191927-74-9
	7-Chlorotryptamine (7-Cl-T)	artificial	7-Cl	H	H	7-Chlorotryptamine	3804-16-8
	Acetryptine (5-acetyltryptamine; 5-AT)	artificial	5-COCH_{3}	H	H	5-Acetyltryptamine	3551-18-6
	5-Phenoxytryptamine (5-PhO-T)	artificial	5-OC_{6}H_{5}	H	H	5-Phenoxytryptamine	31363-70-9
	5-Benzyloxytryptamine (5-BT)	artificial	5-OCH_{2}C_{6}H_{5}	H	H	5-Benzyloxytryptamine	20776-45-8
	5-Carboxamidotryptamine (5-CT)	artificial	5-CONH_{2}	H	H	5-Carboxamidotryptamine	74885-09-9
	5-Nitrotryptamine (Nitro-I)	artificial	5-NO_{2}	H	H	5-Nitrotryptamine	55747-72-3
	5-(Nonyloxy)tryptamine (5-NOT)	artificial	5-O(CH_{2})_{8}CH_{3}	H	H	5-Nonyloxytryptamine	157798-12-4
	2-Methyl-5-hydroxytryptamine	artificial	2-CH_{3}, 5-OH	H	H	3-(2-aminoethyl)-2-methyl-1H-indol-5-ol	78263-90-8
	N-Ethyltryptamine (NET)	artificial	H	H	CH_{2}CH_{3}	N-ethyltryptamine	61-53-0
	N-Propyltryptamine (NPT)	artificial	H	H	CH_{2}CH_{2}CH_{3}	N-propyltryptamine	
	N-Isopropyltryptamine (NiPT)	artificial	H	H	CH(CH_{3})_{2}	N-isopropyltryptamine	14121-10-9
	N-Cyclopropyltryptamine (NcPT)	artificial	H	H	C_{3}H_{5}	N-cyclopropyltryptamine	
	N-sec-Butyltryptamine (NsBT)	artificial	H	H	CH(CH_{3})CH_{2}CH_{3}	N-sec-butyltryptamine	
	N-tert-Butyltryptamine (NtBT)	artificial	H	H	C(CH_{3})_{3}	N-[2-(1H-indol-3-yl)ethyl]-2-methylpropan-2-amine	1344092-44-9
	N-Amyltryptamine (NAT)	artificial	H	H	(CH_{2})_{4}CH_{3}	N-[2-(1H-indol-3-yl)ethyl]pentan-1-amine	
	N-Hexyltryptamine (NHT)	artificial	H	H	(CH_{2})_{5}CH_{3}	N-[2-(1H-indol-3-yl)ethyl]hexan-1-amine	
	N-(2-Cyanoethyl)tryptamine (CE-T)	artificial	H	H	CH_{2}CH_{2}C≡N	N-(2-Cyanoethyl)tryptamine	105115-85-3
	N-Benzyltryptamine (NBnT)	artificial	H	H	CH_{2}C_{6}H_{5}	N-benzyltryptamine	15741-79-4
	CPI-CG-8	artificial	H	H	(2-Indolylethyl)	N-Methyl-N-(2-indolylethyl)tryptamine	?
	T-NBOMe (NBOMeT)	artificial	H	H	CH_{2}C_{6}H_{4}(o-OCH_{3})	N-(2-methoxybenzyl)tryptamine	418781-81-4
	4-AcO-NMT	artificial	4-OCOCH_{3}	CH_{3}	H	4-acetoxy-N-methyltryptamine	?
	4-HO-NET	artificial	4-OH	CH_{2}CH_{3}	H	4-hydroxy-N-ethyltryptamine	
	4-HO-NPT	artificial	4-OH	CH(CH_{3})_{2}	H	4-hydroxy-N-propyltryptamine	
	4-HO-NiPT	artificial	4-OH	CH(CH_{3})_{2}	H	4-hydroxy-N-isopropyltryptamine	
	4-HO-NALT	artificial	4-OH	H	H_{2}C=CH-CH_{2}	4-hydroxy-N-allyltryptamine	
	4-HO-NBT (4-HO-NnBT)	artificial	4-OH	H	(CH_{2})_{3}CH_{3}	4-hydroxy-N-n-butyltryptamine	
	4-HO-NiBT	artificial	4-OH	H	CH_{2}CH(CH_{3})_{2}	4-hydroxy-N-isobutyltryptamine	
	4-HO-NsBT	artificial	4-OH	H	CH(CH_{3})CH_{2}CH_{3}	4-hydroxy-N-sec-butyltryptamine	
	4-HO-NtBT	artificial	4-OH	H	C(CH_{3})_{3}	4-hydroxy-N-tert-butyltryptamine	
	4-HO-NBnT	artificial	4-OH	H	CH_{2}C_{6}H_{5}	4-hydroxy-N-benzyltryptamine	
	1-Me-4-HO-T-NBOMe	artificial	1,Me, 4-OH	H	CH_{2}C_{6}H_{4}-o-OCH_{3}	1-methyl-4-hydroxy-N-(2-methoxybenzyl)tryptamine	
	4-HO-NcHT	artificial	4-OH	H	C_{6}H_{11}	4-hydroxy-N-cyclohexyltryptamine	
	5-MeO-NET	artificial	5-OCH_{3}	H	CH_{2}CH_{3}	5-methoxy-N-ethyltryptamine	1019-46-1
	5-MeO-NiPT	artificial	5-OCH_{3}	H	CH(CH_{3})_{2}	5-methoxy-N-isopropyltryptamine	109921-55-3
	5-MeO-NsBT	artificial	5-OCH_{3}	H	CH(CH_{3})CH_{2}CH_{3}	5-methoxy-N-sec-butyltryptamine	
	5-MeO-NBnT	artificial	5-OCH_{3}	H	CH_{2}C_{6}H_{5}	5-methoxy-N-benzyltryptamine	25100-31-6
	5-MeO-T-NBOMe	artificial	5-OCH_{3}	H	CH_{2}C_{6}H_{4}(o-OCH_{3})	5-methoxy-N-(ortho-methoxybenzyl)tryptamine	1335331-37-7
	5-MeO-T-NB3OMe	artificial	5-OCH_{3}	H	CH_{2}C_{6}H_{4}(m-OCH_{3})	5-methoxy-N-(meta-methoxybenzyl)tryptamine	1648553-42-7
	5-MeO-NBpBrT	artificial	5-OCH_{3}	H	CH_{2}C_{6}H_{4}(p-Br)	N-(4-Bromobenzyl)-2-(5-methoxy-1H-indol-3-yl)ethanamine	155639-13-7
	5-MeO-34MPEMT	artificial	5-OCH_{3}	CH_{3}	CH_{2}CH_{2}C_{6}H_{3}(p,m-OCH_{3})	N-methyl-N-[2-(3,4-dimethoxyphenyl)ethyl]-2-(5-methoxy-1H-indol-3-yl)ethanamine	
	Idalopirdine	artificial	6-F	H	CH_{2}C_{6}H_{4}(m-OCH_{2}CF_{2}CF_{2}H)	2-(6-Fluoro-1H-indol-3-yl)-N-(3-(2,2,3,3-tetrafluoro-propoxy)benzyl)ethanamine	467459-31-0
	Z2876442907	artificial	4-CH_{3}	H	CH_{2}(C_{3}HNS)-COOCH_{2}CH_{3}	ethyl 2-({[2-(4-methyl-1H-indol-3-yl)ethyl]amino}methyl)-1,3-thiazole-5-carboxylate	
	IHCH-2389	artificial	7-OCH_{3}	CH_{3}	(CH_{2})_{2}-C_{9}H_{7}N_{2}O		
	Cis-2',5'-dimethyl-4-HO-azt-T	artificial	4-OH	cis-(CHCH_{3})CH_{2}(CHCH_{3})		3-{2-[(2R,4S)-2,4-dimethylazetidin-1-yl]ethyl}-1H-indol-4-ol	
	Pyr-T	artificial	H	(CH_{2})_{4}		3-[2-(Pyrrolidin-1-yl)ethyl]-1H-indole	14008-96-9
	4-HO-pyr-T	artificial	4-OH	(CH_{2})_{4}		3-[2-(Pyrrolidin-1-yl)ethyl]-1H-indol-4-ol	63097-26-7
	Cis-2',5'-dimethyl-4-HO-pyr-T	artificial	4-OH	cis-(CHCH_{3})CH_{2}CH_{2}(CHCH_{3})		3-{2-[(2R,5S)-2,5-dimethylpyrrolidin-1-yl]ethyl}-1H-indol-4-ol	
	5-MeO-pyr-T	artificial	5-OCH_{3}	(CH_{2})_{4}		5-Methoxy-3-[2-(pyrrolidin-1-yl)ethyl]-1H-indole	3949-14-2
	4-F-5-MeO-pyr-T	artificial	4-F-5-OCH_{3}	(CH_{2})_{4}		4-Fluoro-5-methoxy-3-(2-pyrrolidin-1-ylethyl)-1H-indole	344790-93-8
	Pip-T	artificial	H	(CH_{2})_{5}		3-(2-Piperidin-1-ylethyl)-1H-indole	26628-87-5
	5-MeO-pip-T	artificial	5-OCH_{3}	(CH_{2})_{5}		5-Methoxy-3-(2-piperidin-1-ylethyl)-1H-indole	
	Mor-T	artificial	H	?		3-[2-(Morpholin-4-yl)ethyl]-1H-indole	25262-59-3
	5-MeO-mor-T	artificial	5-OCH_{3}	?		5-Methoxy-3-[2-(morpholin-4-yl)ethyl]-1H-indole	3949-13-1
	IsoqT	artificial	H	?		3-[2-(2-Azabicyclo[2.2.2]octan-2-yl)ethyl]-1H-indole	
	5-MeO-IsoqT	artificial	5-OCH_{3}	?		3-[2-(2-Azabicyclo[2.2.2]octan-2-yl)ethyl]-5-methoxy-1H-indole	
	Indolylethylfentanyl	artificial	H	(CH_{2})_{5}-4-N(COCH_{2}CH_{3})C_{6}H_{5}		N-[1-[2-(1H-indol-3-yl)ethyl]piperidin-4-yl]-N-phenylpropanamide	58399-46-5
	Methylethyltryptamine (MET)	artificial	H	CH_{3}	CH_{2}CH_{3}	N-Methyl-N-ethyltryptamine	5599-69-9
	Methylpropyltryptamine (MPT)	artificial	H	CH_{3}	CH_{2}CH_{2}CH_{3}	N-Methyl-N-propyltryptamine	850032-72-3
	Methylisopropyltryptamine (MiPT)	artificial	H	CH_{3}	CH(CH_{3})_{2}	N-Methyl-N-isopropyltryptamine	96096-52-5
	Methylcyclopropyltryptamine (McPT)	artificial	H	CH_{3}	C_{3}H_{5}	N-Methyl-N-cyclopropyltryptamine	1373918-63-8
	Ethylcyclopropyltryptamine (EcPT)	artificial	H	CH_{2}CH_{3}	C_{3}H_{5}	N-ethyl-N-cyclopropyltryptamine	
	Propylcyclopropyltryptamine (PcPT)	artificial	H	CH_{2}CH_{2}CH_{3}	C_{3}H_{5}	N-propyl-N-cyclopropyltryptamine	
	Isopropylcyclopropyltryptamine (iPcPT)	artificial	H	CH(CH_{3})_{2}	C_{3}H_{5}	N-isopropyl-N-cyclopropyltryptamine	
	Dicyclopropyltryptamine (DcPT)	artificial	H	C_{3}H_{5}	C_{3}H_{5}	N,N-dicyclopropyltryptamine	1373918-62-7
	Methylbutyltryptamine (MBT)	artificial	H	CH_{3}	(CH_{2})_{3}CH_{3}	N-Methyl-N-butyltryptamine	848130-12-1
	Methyl-sec-butyltryptamine (MsBT)	artificial	H	CH_{3}	CH(CH_{3})CH_{2}CH_{3}	N-Methyl-N-sec-butyltryptamine	
	Methylisobutyltryptamine (MiBT)	artificial	H	CH_{3}	CH_{2}CH(CH_{3})_{2}	N-Methyl-N-iso-butyltryptamine	
	Methylcyclopropylmethyltryptamine (McPMT)	artificial	H	CH_{3}	CH_{2}C_{3}H_{5}	N-Methyl-N-(cyclopropylmethyl)tryptamine	
	Deudimethyltryptamine (DMT-d_{10}; likely CYB004)	artificial	H	CH_{3}	CH_{3}	α,α,β,β-Tetradeutero-N,N-bis(trideuteriomethyl)tryptamine	2742678-60-8
	SPL028 (D_{2}-DMT)	artificial	H	CH_{3}	CH_{3}	α,α-Dideutero-N,N-dimethyltryptamine	?
	Diethyltryptamine (DET)	artificial	H	CH_{2}CH_{3}	CH_{2}CH_{3}	N,N-diethyltryptamine	61-51-8
	Ethylpropyltryptamine (EPT)	artificial	H	CH_{2}CH_{3}	CH_{2}CH_{2}CH_{3}	N-Ethyl-N-propyltryptamine	850032-68-7
	Ethylisopropyltryptamine (EiPT)	artificial	H	CH_{2}CH_{3}	CH(CH_{3})_{2}	N-Ethyl-N-isopropyltryptamine	848130-11-0
	Dipropyltryptamine (DPT)	artificial	H	CH_{2}CH_{2}CH_{3}	CH_{2}CH_{2}CH_{3}	N,N-dipropyltryptamine	61-52-9
	Propylisopropyltryptamine (PiPT)	artificial	H	CH_{2}CH_{2}CH_{3}	CH(CH_{3})_{2}	N-Propyl-N-isopropyltryptamine	1354632-00-0
	Diisopropyltryptamine (DiPT)	artificial	H	CH(CH_{3})_{2}	CH(CH_{3})_{2}	N,N-diisopropyltryptamine	14780-24-6
	Ethylbutyltryptamine (EBT)	artificial	H	CH_{2}CH_{3}	(CH_{2})_{3}CH_{3}	N-ethyl-N-butyltryptamine	
	Propylbutyltryptamine (PBT)	artificial	H	CH_{2}CH_{2}CH_{3}	(CH_{2})_{3}CH_{3}	N-propyl-N-butyltryptamine	
	Isopropyl-sec-butyltryptamine (iPsBT)	artificial	H	CH(CH_{3})_{2}	CH(CH_{3})CH_{2}CH_{3}	N-isopropyl-N-sec-butyltryptamine	
	Dibutyltryptamine (DBT)	artificial	H	(CH_{2})_{3}CH_{3}	(CH_{2})_{3}CH_{3}	N,N-dibutyltryptamine	15741-77-2
	Diisobutyltryptamine (DiBT)	artificial	H	CH_{2}CH(CH_{3})_{2}	CH_{2}CH(CH_{3})_{2}	N,N-diisobutyltryptamine	63938-64-7
	Di-sec-butyltryptamine (DsBT)	artificial	H	CH(CH_{3})CH_{2}CH_{3}	CH(CH_{3})CH_{2}CH_{3}	N,N-disecbutyltryptamine	
	Diamyltryptamine (DAT)	artificial	H	(CH_{2})_{4}CH_{3}	(CH_{2})_{4}CH_{3}	N,N-diamyltryptamine	
	Dihexyltryptamine (DHT)	artificial	H	(CH_{2})_{5}CH_{3}	(CH_{2})_{5}CH_{3}	N,N-dihexyltryptamine	
	Methylallyltryptamine (MALT)	artificial	H	CH_{3}	H_{2}C=CH-CH_{2}	N-methyl-N-allyltryptamine	1366416-29-6
	Diallyltryptamine (DALT)	artificial	H	H_{2}C=CH-CH_{2}	H_{2}C=CH-CH_{2}	N,N-diallyltryptamine	60676-77-9
	Propylallyltryptamine (PALT)	artificial	H	H_{2}C=CH-CH_{2}	CH_{2}CH_{2}CH_{3}	N-propyl-N-allyltryptamine	2686297-71-0
	Isopropylallyltryptamine (iPALT, ALiPT)	artificial	H	H_{2}C=CH-CH_{2}	CH(CH_{3})_{2}	N-allyl-N-isopropyltryptamine	
	N-DEAOP-NMT	artificial	H	?	CH_{3}	N-(3-diethylamino-3-oxopropyl)-N-methyltryptamine	
	5-MeO-N-DEAOP-NMT	artificial	5-OCH_{3}	?	CH_{3}	N-(3-diethylamino-3-oxopropyl)-N-methyl-5-methoxytryptamine	
	N-DEAOP-NET	artificial	H	?	CH_{2}CH_{3}	N-(3-diethylamino-3-oxopropyl)-N-ethyltryptamine	
	5-MeO-N-DEAOP-NET	artificial	5-OCH_{3}	?	CH_{2}CH_{3}	N-(3-diethylamino-3-oxopropyl)-N-ethyl-5-methoxytryptamine	
	AHR-1229	artificial	H	CH_{3}	?	N-butyl-N-(1-phenylpyrrolidin-4-yl)tryptamine	?
	N-Phosphonooxymethyl-DMT (N-POM-DMT)	artificial	H	CH_{3}	CH_{3}	N-phosphonooxymethyl-N,N-dimethyltryptamine	?
	N-Phosphonooxymethyl-5-MeO-DMT (N-POM-5-MeO-DMT)	artificial	5-OCH_{3}	CH_{3}	CH_{3}	5-methoxy-N-phosphonooxymethyl-N,N-dimethyltryptamine	?
	1-Methyl-DMT	artificial	1-CH_{3}	CH_{3}	CH_{3}	1-methyl-N,N-dimethyltryptamine	13366-47-7
	2-Methyl-DMT	artificial	2-CH_{3}	CH_{3}	CH_{3}	(2-(2-methyl-1H-indol-3-yl)-1-methyl-ethyl)dimethylamine	1080-95-1
	2-Methyl-DET	artificial	2-CH_{3}	CH_{2}CH_{3}	CH_{2}CH_{3}	N,N-Diethyl-2-(2-methyl-1H-indol-3-yl)ethan-1-amine	26628-88-6
	2-Methyl-DiPT	artificial	2-CH_{3}	CH(CH_{3})_{2}	CH(CH_{3})_{2}	2-methyl-N,N-diisopropyltryptamine	
	2-Methyl-iPALT	artificial	2-CH_{3}	CH(CH_{3})_{2}	H_{2}C=CH-CH_{2}	2-methyl-N-isopropyl-N-allyltryptamine	2915652-49-0
	4-Amino-DMT	artificial	4-NH_{2}	CH_{3}	CH_{3}	4-amino-N,N-dimethyltryptamine	60331-61-5
	4-Methyl-DMT	artificial	4-CH_{3}	CH_{3}	CH_{3}	4,N,N-trimethyltryptamine	28289-23-8
	4-MeO-DMT	artificial	4-OCH_{3}	CH_{3}	CH_{3}	4-methoxy-N,N-dimethyltryptamine	3965-97-7
	4-MeO-DET	artificial	4-OCH_{3}	CH_{2}CH_{3}	CH_{2}CH_{3}	4-methoxy-N,N-diethyltryptamine	
	4-MeO-MiPT	artificial	4-OCH_{3}	CH_{3}	CH(CH_{3})_{2}	4-methoxy-N-methyl-N-isopropyltryptamine	96096-53-6
	4-MeO-DiPT	artificial	4-OCH_{3}	CH(CH_{3})_{2}	CH(CH_{3})_{2}	4-methoxy-N,N-diisopropyltryptamine	
	Deupsilocin (d_{10}-psilocin; likely CYB003)	artificial	4-OH	CH_{3}	CH_{3}	4-Hydroxy-α,α,β,β-Tetradeutero-N,N-bis(trideuteriomethyl)tryptamine	1435934-64-7
	4-MeS-DMT	artificial	4-SCH_{3}	CH_{3}	CH_{3}	4-methylthio-N,N-dimethyltryptamine	10455-77-3
	4-AcO-DMT (psilacetin)	artificial	4-OCOCH_{3}	CH_{3}	CH_{3}	4-acetoxy-N,N-dimethyltryptamine	92292-84-7
	4-PrO-DMT	artificial	4-OCOCH_{2}CH_{3}	CH_{3}	CH_{3}	4-propionyloxy-N,N-dimethyltryptamine	1373882-11-1
	4-GO-DMT (RE109; FT-109)	artificial	4-OCO(CH_{2})_{3}COOH	CH_{3}	CH_{3}	4-glutaryloxy-N,N-dimethyltryptamine	
	4-HO-MET (metocin)	artificial	4-OH	CH_{3}	CH_{2}CH_{3}	4-hydroxy-N-methyl-N-ethyltryptamine	77872-41-4
	4-AcO-MET	artificial	4-OCOCH_{3}	CH_{3}	CH_{2}CH_{3}	4-acetoxy-N-methyl-N-ethyltryptamine	1445751-40-5
	4-PrO-MET	artificial	4-OCOCH_{2}CH_{3}	CH_{3}	CH_{2}CH_{3}	4-propionyloxy-N-methyl-N-ethyltryptamine	
	4-PO-MET	artificial	4-OPO_{3}H_{2}	CH_{3}	CH_{2}CH_{3}	4-phosphoryloxy-N-methyl-N-ethyltryptamine	
	4-HO-DET (ethocin)	artificial	4-OH	CH_{2}CH_{3}	CH_{2}CH_{3}	4-hydroxy-N,N-diethyltryptamine	22204-89-3
	4-AcO-DET	artificial	4-OCOCH_{3}	CH_{2}CH_{3}	CH_{2}CH_{3}	4-acetoxy-N,N-diethyltryptamine	1135424-15-5
	4-PO-DET (ethocybin)	artificial	4-OPO_{3}H_{2}	CH_{2}CH_{3}	CH_{2}CH_{3}	4-phosphoryloxy-N,N-diethyltryptamine	60480-02-6
	4-HO-EPT	artificial	4-OH	CH_{2}CH_{3}	CH_{2}CH_{2}CH_{3}	4-hydroxy-N-ethyl-N-propyltryptamine	2595431-59-5
	4-AcO-EPT	artificial	4-OCOCH_{3}	CH_{2}CH_{3}	CH_{2}CH_{2}CH_{3}	4-acetoxy-N-ethyl-N-propyltryptamine	2750249-90-0
	4-PO-EPT	artificial	4-OPO_{3}H_{2}	CH_{2}CH_{3}	CH_{2}CH_{2}CH_{3}	4-phosphoryloxy-N-ethyl-N-propyltryptamine	
	4-AcO-EiPT	artificial	4-OCOCH_{3}	CH_{2}CH_{3}	CH(CH_{3})_{2}	4-acetoxy-N-ethyl-N-isopropyltryptamine	
	4-HO-MPT	artificial	4-OH	CH_{3}	CH_{2}CH_{2}CH_{3}	4-hydroxy-N-methyl-N-propyltryptamine	763035-03-6
	4-AcO-MPT	artificial	4-OCOCH_{3}	CH_{3}	CH_{2}CH_{2}CH_{3}	4-acetoxy-N-methyl-N-propyltryptamine	2173386-55-3
	4-HO-MiPT	artificial	4-OH	CH(CH_{3})_{2}	CH_{3}	4-hydroxy-N-isopropyl-N-methyltryptamine	77872-43-6
	4-AcO-MiPT	artificial	4-OCOCH_{3}	CH_{3}	CH(CH_{3})_{2}	4-acetoxy-N-methyl-N-isopropyltryptamine	1024612-25-6
	4-HO-MALT	artificial	4-OH	CH_{3}	H_{2}C=CH-CH_{2}	4-hydroxy-N-methyl-N-allyltryptamine	
	4-AcO-MALT	artificial	4-OCOCH_{3}	CH_{3}	H_{2}C=CH-CH_{2}	4-acetoxy-N-Methyl-N-allyltryptamine	
	4-HO-iPALT	artificial	4-OH	CH(CH_{3})_{2}	H_{2}C=CH-CH_{2}	4-hydroxy-N-isopropyl-N-allyltryptamine	
	4-HO-MBT	artificial	4-OH	(CH_{2})_{3}CH_{3}	CH_{3}	4-hydroxy-N-butyl-N-methyltryptamine	
	4-HO-MsBT	artificial	4-OH	CH(CH_{3})CH_{2}CH_{3}	CH_{3}	4-hydroxy-N-sec-butyl-N-methyltryptamine	
	4-HO-MtBT	artificial	4-OH	C(CH_{3})_{3}	CH_{3}	4-hydroxy-N-tert-butyl-N-methyltryptamine	
	4-HO-EiBT	artificial	4-OH	CH_{2}CH(CH_{3})_{2}	CH_{2}CH_{3}	4-hydroxy-N-iso-butyl-N-ethyltryptamine	
	4-HO-McPT	artificial	4-OH	C_{3}H_{5}	CH_{3}	4-hydroxy-N-cyclopropyl-N-methyltryptamine	2883663-05-4
	4-AcO-McPT	artificial	4-OCOCH_{3}	C_{3}H_{5}	CH_{3}	4-acetoxy-N-cyclopropyl-N-methyltryptamine	
	4-HO-McPeT	artificial	4-OH	C_{5}H_{9}	CH_{3}	4-hydroxy-N-cyclopentyl-N-methyltryptamine	77872-48-1
	4-HO-McPMT	artificial	4-OH	CH_{2}C_{3}H_{5}	CH_{3}	4-hydroxy-N-cyclopropylmethyl-N-methyltryptamine	
	4-HO-DPT	artificial	4-OH	CH_{2}CH_{2}CH_{3}	CH_{2}CH_{2}CH_{3}	4-hydroxy-N,N-dipropyltryptamine	63065-88-3
	4-AcO-DPT	artificial	4-OCOCH_{3}	CH_{2}CH_{2}CH_{3}	CH_{2}CH_{2}CH_{3}	4-acetoxy-N,N-dipropyltryptamine	1445751-75-6
	4-Methylcarbonato-DPT (4-MeCO3-DPT)	artificial	4-MeCO_{3}	CH_{2}CH_{2}CH_{3}	CH_{2}CH_{2}CH_{3}	4-methylcarbonato-N,N-dipropyltryptamine	?
	4-HO-PiPT	artificial	4-OH	CH_{2}CH_{2}CH_{3}	CH(CH_{3})_{2}	4-hydroxy-N-propyl-N-isopropyltryptamine	
	4-AcO-PiPT	artificial	4-OCOCH_{3}	CH_{2}CH_{2}CH_{3}	CH(CH_{3})_{2}	4-acetoxy-N-propyl-N-isopropyltryptamine	
	4-HO-DiPT	artificial	4-OH	CH(CH_{3})_{2}	CH(CH_{3})_{2}	4-hydroxy-N,N-diisopropyltryptamine	132328-45-1
	4-AcO-DiPT	artificial	4-OCOCH_{3}	CH(CH_{3})_{2}	CH(CH_{3})_{2}	4-acetoxy-N,N-diisopropyltryptamine	936015-60-0
	4-PrO-DiPT	artificial	4-OCOCH_{2}CH_{3}	CH(CH_{3})_{2}	CH(CH_{3})_{2}	4-propionyloxy-N,N-diisopropyltryptamine	1373882-13-3
	Luvesilocin (RE104; FT-104)	artificial	4-OCO(CH_{2})_{3}COOH	CH(CH_{3})_{2}	CH(CH_{3})_{2}	4-glutaryloxy-N,N-diisopropyltryptamine	
	4-PO-DiPT	artificial	4-OPO_{3}H_{2}	CH(CH_{3})_{2}	CH(CH_{3})_{2}	4-phosphoryloxy-N,N-diisopropyltryptamine	1373882-09-7
	4-HO-DALT	artificial	4-OH	H_{2}C=CH-CH_{2}	H_{2}C=CH-CH_{2}	4-hydroxy-N,N-diallyltryptamine	2173386-70-2
	4-AcO-DALT	artificial	4-OCOCH_{3}	H_{2}C=CH-CH_{2}	H_{2}C=CH-CH_{2}	4-acetoxy-N,N-diallyltryptamine	1445751-71-2
	4-HO-DBT	artificial	4-OH	(CH_{2})_{3}CH_{3}	(CH_{2})_{3}CH_{3}	4-hydroxy-N,N-dibutyltryptamine	63065-89-4
	4-HO-DiBT	artificial	4-OH	CH_{2}CH(CH_{3})_{2}	CH_{2}CH(CH_{3})_{2}	4-hydroxy-N,N-diisobutyltryptamine	
	4-HO-DsBT	artificial	4-OH	CH(CH_{3})CH_{2}CH_{3}	CH(CH_{3})CH_{2}CH_{3}	4-hydroxy-N,N-disecbutyltryptamine	127507-01-1
	4-Fluoro-DMT	artificial	4-F	CH_{3}	CH_{3}	4-fluoro-N,N-dimethyltryptamine	1644-64-0
	4-Bromo-DMT	artificial	4-Br	CH_{3}	CH_{3}	4-bromo-N,N-dimethyltryptamine	?
	5-MeO-DMT-d4 (α,α,β,β-tetradeutero-5-MeO-DMT)	artificial	5-OCH_{3}	CH_{3}	CH_{3}	α,α,β,β-Tetradeutero-5-methoxy-N,N-dimethyltryptamine	66521-37-7
	5-MeO-MET	artificial	5-OCH_{3}	CH_{2}CH_{3}	CH_{3}	5-methoxy-N-methyl-N-ethyltryptamine	16977-53-0
	5-MeO-DET	artificial	5-OCH_{3}	CH_{2}CH_{3}	CH_{2}CH_{3}	5-methoxy-N,N-diethyltryptamine	2454-70-8
	5-MeO-MPT	artificial	5-OCH_{3}	CH_{3}	CH_{2}CH_{2}CH_{3}	5-methoxy-N-methyl-N-propyltryptamine	
	5-MeO-EPT	artificial	5-OCH_{3}	CH_{2}CH_{3}	CH_{2}CH_{2}CH_{3}	5-methoxy-N-ethyl-N-propyltryptamine	850032-67-6
	5-MeO-DPT	artificial	5-OCH_{3}	CH_{2}CH_{2}CH_{3}	CH_{2}CH_{2}CH_{3}	5-methoxy-N,N-dipropyltryptamine	69496-75-9
	5-MeO-MALT	artificial	5-OCH_{3}	H_{2}C=CH-CH_{2}	CH_{3}	5-methoxy-N-Methyl-N-allyltryptamine	1373918-64-9
	5-MeO-DALT	artificial	5-OCH_{3}	H_{2}C=CH-CH_{2}	H_{2}C=CH-CH_{2}	5-methoxy-N,N-diallyltryptamine	928822-98-4
	ASR-3001 (5-MeO-iPALT)	artificial	5-OCH_{3}	H_{2}C=CH-CH_{2}	CH_{2}CH(CH_{3})_{2}	5-methoxy-N-allyl-N-isopropyltryptamine	
	5-MeO-MiPT	artificial	5-OCH_{3}	CH_{3}	CH(CH_{3})_{2}	5-methoxy-N,N-methylisopropyltryptamine	96096-55-8
	5,6-MeO-MiPT	artificial	5-OCH_{3}, 6-OCH_{3}	CH_{3}	CH(CH_{3})_{2}	5,6-dimethoxy-N,N-methylisopropyltryptamine	
	5-MeO-MBT	artificial	5-OCH_{3}	CH_{3}	(CH_{2})_{3}CH_{3}	5-methoxy-N-methyl-N-butyltryptamine	
	5-MeO-MsBT	artificial	5-OCH_{3}	CH_{3}	CH(CH_{3})CH_{2}CH_{3}	5-methoxy-N-methyl-N-sec-butyltryptamine	
	5-MeO-McPT	artificial	5-OCH_{3}	CH_{3}	C_{3}H_{5}	5-methoxy-N-methyl-N-cyclopropyltryptamine	
	5-MeO-McBT	artificial	5-OCH_{3}	CH_{3}	C_{4}H_{7}	5-methoxy-N-methyl-N-cyclobutyltryptamine	
	5-MeO-EiPT	artificial	5-OCH_{3}	CH_{2}CH_{3}	CH(CH_{3})_{2}	5-methoxy-N-ethyl-N-isopropyltryptamine	850032-66-5
	5-MeO-PiPT	artificial	5-OCH_{3}	CH_{2}CH_{2}CH_{3}	CH(CH_{3})_{2}	5-methoxy-N-propyl-N-isopropyltryptamine	
	5-MeO-DiPT	artificial	5-OCH_{3}	CH(CH_{3})_{2}	CH(CH_{3})_{2}	5-methoxy-N,N-diisopropyltryptamine	4021-34-5
	5,6-DiMeO-DiPT (5,6-MeO-DiPT)	artificial	5-OCH_{3}, 6-OCH_{3}	CH(CH_{3})_{2}	CH(CH_{3})_{2}	5,6-dimethoxy-N,N-diisopropyltryptamine	?
	5-MeO-DBT	artificial	5-OCH_{3}	(CH_{2})_{3}CH_{3}	(CH_{2})_{3}CH_{3}	5-methoxy-N,N-dibutyltryptamine	73785-42-9
	5-MeO-DsBT	artificial	5-OCH_{3}	CH(CH_{3})CH_{2}CH_{3}	CH(CH_{3})CH_{2}CH_{3}	5-methoxy-N,N-di-sec-butyltryptamine	
	5-MeS-DMT	artificial	5-SCH_{3}	CH_{3}	CH_{3}	5-methylthio-N,N-dimethyltryptamine	5102-11-4
	5-AcO-DMT (O-acetylbufotenine)	artificial	5-OCOCH_{3}	CH_{3}	CH_{3}	5-acetoxy-N,N-dimethyltryptamine	16977-50-7
	5-t-BuCO-DMT (O-pivalylbufotenine)	artificial	?	CH_{3}	CH_{3}	5-pivaloxy-N,N-dimethyltryptamine	?
	5-AcO-MET	artificial	5-OCOCH_{3}	CH_{3}	CH_{2}CH_{3}	5-acetoxy-N-methyl-N-ethyltryptamine	
	5-AcO-DET	artificial	5-OCOCH_{3}	CH_{2}CH_{3}	CH_{2}CH_{3}	5-acetoxy-N,N-diethyltryptamine	
	5-AcO-EPT	artificial	5-OCOCH_{3}	CH_{2}CH_{3}	CH_{2}CH_{2}CH_{3}	5-acetoxy-N-ethyl-N-propyltryptamine	
	5-AcO-DPT	artificial	5-OCOCH_{3}	CH_{2}CH_{2}CH_{3}	CH_{2}CH_{2}CH_{3}	5-acetoxy-N,N-dipropyltryptamine	
	5-AcO-MiPT	artificial	5-OCOCH_{3}	CH_{3}	CH(CH_{3})_{2}	5-acetoxy-N-methyl-N-isopropyltryptamine	
	5-AcO-DiPT	artificial	5-OCOCH_{3}	CH(CH_{3})_{2}	CH(CH_{3})_{2}	5-acetoxy-N,N-diisopropyltryptamine	
	5-Ethoxy-DMT	artificial	5-OCH_{2}CH_{3}	CH_{3}	CH_{3}	5-ethoxy-N,N-dimethyltryptamine	855245-09-9
	5-Ethoxy-MET	artificial	5-OCH_{2}CH_{3}	CH_{3}	CH_{2}CH_{3}	5-ethoxy-N-methyl-N-ethyltryptamine	
	5-Ethoxy-DET	artificial	5-OCH_{2}CH_{3}	CH_{2}CH_{3}	CH_{2}CH_{3}	5-ethoxy-N,N-diethyltryptamine	
	5-Ethoxy-MPT	artificial	5-OCH_{2}CH_{3}	CH_{3}	CH_{2}CH_{2}CH_{3}	5-ethoxy-N-methyl-N-propyltryptamine	
	5-Ethoxy-EPT	artificial	5-OCH_{2}CH_{3}	CH_{2}CH_{3}	CH_{2}CH_{2}CH_{3}	5-ethoxy-N-ethyl-N-propyltryptamine	
	5-Ethoxy-DPT	artificial	5-OCH_{2}CH_{3}	CH_{2}CH_{2}CH_{3}	CH_{2}CH_{3}	5-ethoxy-N,N-dipropyltryptamine	
	5-Ethoxy-MiPT	artificial	5-OCH_{2}CH_{3}	CH_{3}	CH(CH_{3})_{2}	5-ethoxy-N-methyl-N-isopropyltryptamine	
	5-Ethoxy-EiPT	artificial	5-OCH_{2}CH_{3}	CH_{2}CH_{3}	CH(CH_{3})_{2}	5-ethoxy-N-ethyl-N-isopropyltryptamine	
	5-Ethoxy-DiPT	artificial	5-OCH_{2}CH_{3}	CH(CH_{3})_{2}	CH(CH_{3})_{2}	5-ethoxy-N,N-diisopropyltryptamine	
	5-Ethoxy-DALT	artificial	5-OCH_{2}CH_{3}	H_{2}C=CH-CH_{2}	H_{2}C=CH-CH_{2}	5-ethoxy-N,N-diallyltryptamine	
	5-BnO-DMT	artificial	5-OCH_{2}C_{6}H_{5}	CH_{3}	CH_{3}	5-benzyloxy-N,N-dimethyltryptamine	101832-88-6
	5-HO-MET	artificial	5-OH	CH_{3}	CH_{2}CH_{3}	5-hydroxy-N-methyl-N-ethyltryptamine	1443666-13-4
	5-HO-DET	artificial	5-OH	CH_{2}CH_{3}	CH_{2}CH_{3}	5-hydroxy-N,N-diethyltryptamine	14009-42-8
	5-HO-DPT	artificial	5-OH	CH_{2}CH_{2}CH_{3}	CH_{2}CH_{2}CH_{3}	5-hydroxy-N,N-dipropyltryptamine	36288-75-2
	5-HO-MiPT	artificial	5-OH	CH_{3}	CH(CH_{3})_{2}	5-hydroxy-N-methyl-N-isopropyltryptamine	
	5-HO-DiPT	artificial	5-OH	CH(CH_{3})_{2}	CH(CH_{3})_{2}	5-hydroxy-N,N-diisopropyltryptamine	36288-76-3
	5-Methyl-DMT (5,N,N-TMT)	artificial	5-CH_{3}	CH_{3}	CH_{3}	5,N,N-trimethyltryptamine	22120-39-4
	5-Ethyl-DMT	artificial	5-CH_{2}CH_{3}	CH_{3}	CH_{3}	5-ethyl-N,N-dimethyltryptamine	171783-25-8
	5-Isopropyl-DMT	artificial	5-CH(CH_{3})_{2}	CH_{3}	CH_{3}	5-isopropyl-N,N-dimethyltryptamine	156281-04-8
	5-(t-Butyl)-DMT	artificial	5-C(CH_{3})_{3}	CH_{3}	CH_{3}	5-(tert-butyl)-N,N-dimethyltryptamine	
	5-Fluoro-NiPT	artificial	5-F	CH(CH_{3})_{2}	H	5-fluoro-N-isopropyltryptamine	?
	5-Fluoro-DMT	artificial	5-F	CH_{3}	CH_{3}	5-fluoro-N,N-dimethyltryptamine	22120-36-1
	Bretisilocin (5-fluoro-MET; GM-2505)	artificial	5-F	CH_{3}	CH_{2}CH_{3}	5-fluoro-N-methyl-N-ethyltryptamine	2698331-35-8
	5-Fluoro-DET	artificial	5-F	CH_{2}CH_{3}	CH_{2}CH_{3}	5-fluoro-N,N-diethyltryptamine	
	5-Fluoro-EPT	artificial	5-F	CH_{2}CH_{3}	CH_{2}CH_{2}CH_{3}	5-fluoro-N-ethyl-N-propyltryptamine	
	5-Fluoro-DPT	artificial	5-F	CH_{2}CH_{2}CH_{3}	CH_{2}CH_{2}CH_{3}	5-fluoro-N,N-dipropyltryptamine	
	5-Fluoro-PiPT	artificial	5-F	CH_{2}CH_{2}CH_{3}	CH(CH_{3})_{2}	5-fluoro-N-propyl-N-isopropyltryptamine	
	5-Fluoro-PcBT	artificial	5-F	CH_{2}CH_{2}CH_{3}	CH(CH_{2})_{3}	5-fluoro-N-propyl-N-cyclobutyltryptamine	
	5-Fluoro-iPcBT	artificial	5-F	CH(CH_{3})_{2}	CH(CH_{2})_{3}	5-fluoro-N-isopropyl-N-cyclobutyltryptamine	
	5-Fluoro-DiPT	artificial	5-F	CH(CH_{3})_{2}	CH(CH_{3})_{2}	5-fluoro-N,N-diisoproptryptamine	
	5-Fluoro-sBALT	artificial	5-F	CH(CH_{3})CH_{2}CH_{3}	CH_{2}CH=CH_{2}	5-fluoro-N-sec-butyl-N-allyltryptamine	
	5-Fluoro-M1MALT	artificial	5-F	CH_{3}	CH(CH_{3})CH=CH_{2}	5-fluoro-N-methyl-N-(1-methylallyl)tryptamine	
	5-Chloro-DMT	artificial	5-Cl	CH_{3}	CH_{3}	5-chloro-N,N-dimethyltryptamine	22120-32-7
	5-Iodo-DMT	artificial	5-I	CH_{3}	CH_{3}	5-iodo-N,N-dimethyltryptamine	22120-38-3
	5-TFM-DMT	artificial	5-CF_{3}	CH_{3}	CH_{3}	5-(trifluoromethyl)-N,N-dimethyltryptamine	2418713-32-1
	5-TFMO-DMT	artificial	5-OCF_{3}	CH_{3}	CH_{3}	5-(trifluoromethoxy)-N,N-dimethyltryptamine	
	5-Nitro-DMT	artificial	5-NO_{2}	CH_{3}	CH_{3}	5-nitro-N,N-dimethyltryptamine	69937-13-9
	5-CN-DMT	artificial	5-C≡N	CH_{3}	CH_{3}	5-cyano-N,N-dimethyltryptamine	17380-42-6
	5-CN-DPT	artificial	5-C≡N	CH_{2}CH_{2}CH_{3}	CH_{2}CH_{2}CH_{3}	5-cyano-N,N-dipropyltryptamine	74885-19-1
	Almotriptan	artificial	5-(CH_{2}SO_{2}N(CH_{2})_{4})	CH_{3}	CH_{3}	N,N-dimethyl-2- [5-(pyrrolidin-1-ylsulfonylmethyl)- 1H-indol-3-yl]-ethanamine	154323-57-6
	Rizatriptan	artificial	5-(CH_{2}(N_{3}(CH)_{2}))	CH_{3}	CH_{3}	N,N-dimethyl-2-[5-(1H-1,2,4-triazol-1-ylmethyl)-1H-indol-3-yl]ethanamine	145202-66-0
	Sumatriptan	artificial	5-(CH_{2}SO_{2}NHCH_{3})	CH_{3}	CH_{3}	1-[3-(2-Dimethylaminoethyl)-1H-indol-5-yl]-N-methyl-methanesulfonamide	103628-46-2
	Zolmitriptan	artificial	5-(CHNHC=OOCH_{2})	CH_{3}	CH_{3}	5-( 4-(S)-1,3-oxazolidin-2-one)-N,N-dimethyltryptamine	139264-17-8
	6-Fluoro-DMT	artificial	6-F	CH_{3}	CH_{3}	6-fluoro-N,N-dimethyltryptamine	1511-31-5
	6-Fluoro-DET	artificial	6-F	CH_{2}CH_{3}	CH_{2}CH_{3}	6-fluoro-N,N-diethyltryptamine	2836-69-3
	6-Chloro-DMT	artificial	6-Cl	CH_{3}	CH_{3}	6-chloro-N,N-dimethyltryptamine	25390-72-1
	6-Methyl-DMT	artificial	6-CH_{3}	CH_{3}	CH_{3}	6,N,N-trimethyltryptamine	
	6-Hydroxy-DMT	artificial	6-OH	CH_{3}	CH_{3}	6-hydroxy-N,N-dimethyltryptamine	1476-33-1
	6-Hydroxy-DET	artificial	6-OH	CH_{3}	CH_{3}	6-hydroxy-N,N-diethyltryptamine	1476-59-1
	6-Methoxy-DMT	artificial	6-OCH_{3}	CH_{3}	CH_{3}	6-methoxy-N,N-dimethyltryptamine	2426-88-2
	6-TFMO-DMT (6-trifluoromethoxy-DMT)	artificial	6-OCF_{3}	CH_{3}	CH_{3}	6-trifluoromethoxy-N,N-dimethyltryptamine	
	7-Methyl-DMT	artificial	7-CH_{3}	CH_{3}	CH_{3}	7,N,N-trimethyltryptamine	65882-39-5
	7-Ethyl-DMT	artificial	7-CH_{2}CH_{3}	CH_{3}	CH_{3}	7-ethyl-N,N-dimethyltryptamine	
	7-Chloro-DMT	artificial	7-Cl	CH_{3}	CH_{3}	7-chloro-N,N-dimethyltryptamine	
	7-Bromo-DMT	artificial	7-Br	CH_{3}	CH_{3}	7-bromo-N,N-dimethyltryptamine	74798-68-8
	7-Hydroxy-DMT	artificial	7-OH	CH_{3}	CH_{3}	7-hydroxy-N,N-dimethyltryptamine	7578-26-9
	7-Methoxy-DMT	artificial	7-OCH_{3}	CH_{3}	CH_{3}	7-methoxy-N,N-dimethyltryptamine	
	7-Methoxy-MiPT	artificial	7-OCH_{3}	CH_{3}	CH(CH_{3})_{2}	7-methoxy-N-methyl-N-isopropyltryptamine	
	1-Methylpsilocin	artificial	1-CH_{3}, 4-OH	CH_{3}	CH_{3}	1-Methyl-3-[2-(N,N-dimethylamino)ethyl]-4-hydroxyindole	1465-16-3
	1-Ethylpsilocin	artificial	1-CH_{2}CH_{3}, 4-OH	CH_{3}	CH_{3}	1-Ethyl-3-[2-(N,N-dimethylamino)ethyl]-4-hydroxyindole	1640-02-4
	1-Methyl-5-MeO-DiPT	artificial	1-CH_{3}, 5-OCH_{3}	CH(CH_{3})_{2}	CH(CH_{3})_{2}	1-methyl-5-methoxy-N,N-diisopropyltryptamine	1373882-10-0
	1-Acetyl-DMT (1A-DMT; DMT AР-1)	artificial	1-COCH_{3}	CH_{3}	CH_{3}	1-acetyl-N,N-dimethyltryptamine	39998-62-4
	1-Benzoyl-DMT (1Bz-DMT)	artificial	1-COC_{6}H_{5}	CH_{3}	CH_{3}	1-benzoyl-N,N-dimethyltryptamine	481661-45-4
	NBoc-DMT (NB-DMT)	artificial	1-OCOC(CH_{3})_{3}	CH_{3}	CH_{3}	1-(t-butoxycarbonyl)-N,N-dimethyltryptamine	2210243-51-7
	1-Acetyl-5-MeO-DMT (1A-5-MeO-DMT)	artificial	1-COCH_{3}, 5-OCH_{3}	CH_{3}	CH_{3}	1-acetyl-5-methoxy-N,N-dimethyltryptamine	39998-63-5
	NB-5-MeO-DMT	artificial	1-OCOC(CH_{3})_{3}, 5-OCH_{3}	CH_{3}	CH_{3}	1-(t-butoxycarbonyl)-5-methoxy-N,N-dimethyltryptamine	
	NB-5-MeO-MiPT	artificial	1-OCOC(CH_{3})_{3}, 5-OCH_{3}	CH_{3}	CH(CH_{3})_{2}	1-(t-butoxycarbonyl)-5-methoxy-N-methyl-N-isopropyltryptamine	
	NB-5-MeO-DALT	artificial	1-OCOC(CH_{3})_{3}, 5-OCH_{3}	H_{2}C=CH-CH_{2}	H_{2}C=CH-CH_{2}	1-(t-butoxycarbonyl)-5-methoxy-N,N-diallyltryptamine	
	7-Methylpsilocin (see BMB-A39a)	artificial	4-OH,7-Me	CH_{3}	CH_{3}	4-hydroxy-7-methyl-N,N-dimethyltryptamine	2770305-95-6
	7-Methylpsilocybin (see BMB-201)	artificial	4-PO,7-Me	CH_{3}	CH_{3}	4-phosphoryloxy-7-methyl-N,N-dimethyltryptamine	?
	6-Fluoropsilocin	artificial	4-OH,6-F	CH_{3}	CH_{3}	4-hydroxy-6-fluoro-N,N-dimethyltryptamine	312314-12-8
	6-Fluoro-7-methylpsilocin	artificial	4-OH,6-F,7-Me	CH_{3}	CH_{3}	4-hydroxy-6-fluoro-7-methyl-N,N-dimethyltryptamine	2873459-44-8
	6-Fluoro-5-MeO-DMT	artificial	5-OCH_{3},6-F	CH_{3}	CH_{3}	5-methoxy-6-fluoro-N,N-dimethyltryptamine	
	5,6-Difluoro-EPT	artificial	5-F, 6-F	CH_{2}CH_{3}	CH_{2}CH_{2}CH_{3}	5,6-difluoro-N-ethyl-N-propyltryptamine	
	5-MeO-2-TMT	artificial	2-CH_{3}, 5-OCH_{3}	CH_{3}	CH_{3}	2-(5-methoxy-2-methyl-H-indol-3-yl)-N,N-dimethylethanamine	67292-68-6
	5-MeO-4-TMT	artificial	4-CH_{3}, 5-OCH_{3}	CH_{3}	CH_{3}	5-Methoxy-4,N,N-trimethyltryptamine	
	5-MeO-6-TMT (P-42)	artificial	5-OCH_{3}, 6-CH_{3}	CH_{3}	CH_{3}	5-Methoxy-6,N,N-trimethyltryptamine	
	5-MeO-7-TMT (P-51)	artificial	5-OCH_{3}, 7-CH_{3}	CH_{3}	CH_{3}	5-Methoxy-7,N,N-trimethyltryptamine	61018-77-7
	4-HO-5-MeO-DMT (psilomethoxin)	artificial	4-OH, 5-OCH_{3}	CH_{3}	CH_{3}	4-Hydroxy-5-methoxy-N,N-dimethyltryptamine	2433-31-0
	5-Methylpsilocin (P-10)	artificial	4-HO, 5-CH_{3}	CH_{3}	CH_{3}	4-Hydroxy-5-methyl-N,N-dimethyltryptamine	
	5-Methylpsilocybin (5-Me-4-PO-DMT)	artificial	4-PO, 5-CH_{3}	CH_{3}	CH_{3}	4-Phosphoryloxy-5-methyl-N,N-dimethyltryptamine	?
	4-PO-5-MeO-DMT (5-methoxypsilocybin)	artificial	4-PO, 5-OCH_{3}	CH_{3}	CH_{3}	4-Phosphoryloxy-5-methoxy-N,N-dimethyltryptamine	?
	4-F-5-MeO-DMT	artificial	4-F, 5-OCH_{3}	CH_{3}	CH_{3}	4-Fluoro-5-Methoxy-N,N-dimethyltryptamine	312314-18-4
	5-Me-4-HO-MiPT (P-66)	artificial	4-HO, 5-CH_{3}	CH_{3}	CH(CH_{3})_{2}	4-Hydroxy-5-Methyl-N-methyl-N-isopropyltryptamine	
	7-Me-4-HO-DPT (P-89)	artificial	4-HO, 7-CH_{3}	CH_{2}CH_{2}CH_{3}	CH_{2}CH_{2}CH_{3}	4-Hydroxy-7-Methyl-N,N-dipropyltryptamine	
	5-MeO-7-F-MET	artificial	5-OCH_{3}, 7-F	CH_{3}	CH_{2}CH_{3}	5-Methoxy-7-Fluoro-N-methyl-N-ethyltryptamine	
	HBL20017 (4-F-5-MeS-DMT)	artificial	4-F, 5-SCH_{3}	CH_{3}	CH_{3}	4-Fluoro-5-methylthio-N,N-dimethyltryptamine	?
	HBL20016 (5-MeS-6-F-DMT)	artificial	5-SCH_{3}, 6-F	CH_{3}	CH_{3}	5-Methylthio-6-fluoro-N,N-dimethyltryptamine	?
	EMDT (2-ethyl-5-MeO-DMT)	artificial	2-CH_{2}CH_{3}, 5-OCH_{3}	CH_{3}	CH_{3}	2-(2-ethyl-5-methoxy-1H-indol-3-yl)-N,N-dimethylethanamine	263744-72-5
	ST-1936 (2-methyl-5-chloro-DMT)	artificial	2-CH_{3}, 5-Cl	CH_{3}	CH_{3}	2-(2-methyl-5-chloro-1H-indol-3-yl)-N,N-dimethylethanamine	1210-81-7
	Benanserin (benzyl antiserotonin; BAS; MC-4788; Sq-4788)	artificial	1-CH_{2}C_{6}H_{5}, 2-CH_{3}, 5-OCH_{3}	H	H	2-(1-benzyl-5-methoxy-2-methylindol-3-yl)ethanamine	441-91-8
	O-4310 (1-isopropyl-6-fluoropsilocin)	artificial	1-CH(CH_{3})_{2}, 4-OH, 6-F	CH_{3}	CH_{3}	3-[2-(dimethylamino)ethyl]-6-fluoro-1-isopropyl-1H-indol-4-ol	885671-63-6
	Indorenate (TR-3369)	artificial	5-OCH_{3}, β-COOCH_{3}	H	H	β-Methoxycarbonyl-5-methoxytryptamine	73758-06-2
	CP-132,484 (4,5-DHP-1-Me-T)	artificial	1-methyl-4,5-(OCH_{2}CH_{2}CH_{2})	H	H	1-(2-aminoethyl)-3-methyl-8,9-dihydropyrano(3,2-e)indole	143508-76-3
	4,5-DHP-DMT	artificial	4,5-(OCH_{2}CH_{2}CH_{2})	CH_{3}	CH_{3}	1-(2-dimethylaminoethyl)-8,9-dihydropyrano[3,2-e]indole	135360-97-3
	4,5-DHF-DMT (P-3)	artificial	4,5-(CH_{2}CH_{2}O)	CH_{3}	CH_{3}	2-(3,6-dihydro-2H-furo[2,3-e]indol-8-yl)-N,N-dimethylethan-1-amine	
	4,5-Methylbenzoxazole-DMT (P-131)	artificial	4,5-(OC(CH_{3})=N)	CH_{3}	CH_{3}	N,N-dimethyl-2-(2-methyl-6H-[1,3]oxazolo[4,5-e]indol-8-yl)ethan-1-amine	
	4,5-MDO-DMT	artificial	4,5-(OCH_{2}O)	CH_{3}	CH_{3}	2-(2H,6H-[1,3]Dioxolo[4,5-e]indol-8-yl)-N,N-dimethylethan-1-amine	81249-30-1
	4,5-MDO-DiPT	artificial	4,5-(OCH_{2}O)	CH(CH_{3})_{2}	CH(CH_{3})_{2}	N-[2-(2H,6H-[1,3]Dioxolo[4,5-e]indol-8-yl)ethyl]-N-(propan-2-yl)propan-2-amine	82173-82-8
	4,5-MDO-MiPT	artificial	4,5-(OCH_{2}O)	CH_{3}	CH(CH_{3})_{2}	N-[2-(6H-[1,3]dioxolo[4,5-e]indol-8-yl)ethyl]-N-methylpropan-2-amine	?
	5,6-FUR-DMT (P-4)	artificial	5,6-(CH=CHO)	CH_{3}	CH_{3}	2-(7H-furo[3,2-f]indol-5-yl)-N,N-dimethylethan-1-amine	
	5,6-MDO-DMT	artificial	5,6-(OCH_{2}O)	CH_{3}	CH_{3}	2-(2H,5H-[1,3]Dioxolo[4,5-f]indol-7-yl)-N,N-dimethylethan-1-amine	
	5,6-MDO-MiPT	artificial	5,6-(OCH_{2}O)	CH_{3}	CH(CH_{3})_{2}	N-[2-(2H,5H-[1,3]Dioxolo[4,5-f]indol-7-yl)ethyl]-N-methylpropan-2-amine	
	5,6-MDO-DiPT	artificial	5,6-(OCH_{2}O)	CH(CH_{3})_{2}	CH(CH_{3})_{2}	N-[2-(2H,5H-[1,3]Dioxolo[4,5-f]indol-7-yl)ethyl]-N-(propan-2-yl)propan-2-amine	

=== List of substituted α-alkyltryptamines ===
α-Alkyltryptamines are a group of substituted tryptamines which possess an alkyl group, such as a methyl or ethyl group, attached at the alpha carbon, and in most cases no substitution on the amine nitrogen. α-Alkylation of tryptamine makes it much more metabolically stable and resistant to degradation by monoamine oxidase, resulting in increased potency and greatly lengthened half-life. This is analogous to α-methylation of phenethylamine into amphetamine.

Many α-alkyltryptamines are drugs, acting as monoamine releasing agents, non-selective serotonin receptor agonists, and/or monoamine oxidase inhibitors, and produce psychostimulant, entactogen, and/or psychedelic effects. The most well-known of these agents are α-methyltryptamine (AMT) and α-ethyltryptamine (AET), both of which were used clinically as antidepressants for a brief period of time in the past and are abused as recreational drugs. In accordance with its action as a dual releasing agent of serotonin and dopamine, AET has been found to produce serotonergic neurotoxicity similarly to amphetamines like MDMA and PCA, and the same is also likely to hold true for other serotonin and dopamine-releasing α-alkyltryptamines such as AMT, 5-MeO-AMT, and various others.

Structure	Name	Chemical name	CAS #
	Tryptophan	(2S)-2-amino-3-(1H-indol-3-yl)propanoic acid	73-22-3
	5-Hydroxytryptophan (5-HTP)	(2S)-2-amino-3-(5-hydroxy-1H-indol-3-yl)propanoic acid	4350-09-8
	5-Methoxytryptophan (5-MTP)	(2S)-2-amino-3-(5-methoxy-1H-indol-3-yl)propanoic acid	2504-22-5
	α-Methyltryptophan	(2S)-2-amino-3-(1H-indol-3-yl)-2-methylpropanoic acid	16709-25-4
	α-Methyl-5-HTP	(2S)-2-amino-3-(5-hydroxy-1H-indol-3-yl)-2-methylpropanoic acid	150852-19-0
	α-Methyl-5-MTP	(2S)-2-amino-3-(5-methoxy-1H-indol-3-yl)-2-methylpropanoic acid	?
	AMT (αMT; α-MT; Indopan)	1-(1H-Indol-3-yl)propan-2-amine	299-26-3
	2,α-DMT (2-methyl-AMT)	1-(2-methyl-1H-indol-3-yl)propan-2-amine	4966-28-3
	4-Methyl-AMT	1-methyl-2-(4-methyl-1H-indol-3-yl)-ethylamine	3569-29-7
	5-Fluoro-AMT	1-(5-fluoro-1H-indol-3-yl)propan-2-amine	712-08-3
	5-Chloro-AMT	1-(5-Chloro-1H-indol-3-yl)propan-2-amine	712-07-2
	5-HO-AMT (αMS/α-methyl-5-HT)	3-(2-aminopropyl)-1H-indol-5-ol	304-52-9
	5-MeO-AMT	1-(5-methoxy-1H-indol-3-yl)propan-2-amine	1137-04-8
	5-Ethoxy-AMT	1-(5-ethoxy-1H-indol-3-yl)propan-2-amine	101832-83-1
	5-Isopropoxy-AMT	1-{5-[(propan-2-yl)oxy]-1H-indol-3-yl}propan-2-amine	
	5-Allyloxy-AMT	1-{5-[(prop-2-en-1-yl)oxy]-1H-indol-3-yl}propan-2-amine	
	1-Propyl-5-MeO-AMT	1-(5-methoxy-1-propylindol-3-yl)propan-2-amine	?
	BW-723C86	1-[5-(2-Thienylmethoxy)-1H-indol-3-yl]-2-propanamine	160521-72-2
	6-Fluoro-AMT	1-(6-fluoro-1H-indol-3-yl)propan-2-amine	712-11-8
	7-Chloro-AMT	1-(7-chloro-1H-indol-3-yl)propan-2-amine	711-99-9
	AL-37350A (4,5-DHP-AMT)	(S)-(+)-1-(2-Aminopropyl)-8,9-dihydropyrano[3,2-e]indole	362603-40-5
	Compound 5	1-(3H-benzo[e]indol-1-yl)propan-2-amine	
	AET (αET; α-ET)	1-(1H-indol-3-yl)butan-2-amine	2235-90-7
	4-Methyl-AET	1-(4-Methyl-1H-indol-3-yl)butan-2-amine	28289-30-7
	4-HO-AET	1-(4-hydroxy-1H-indol-3-yl)butan-2-amine	28289-28-3
	5-Fluoro-AET	1-(5-fluoro-1H-indol-3-yl)butan-2-amine	1380137-98-3
	5-Chloro-AET	1-(5-chloro-1H-indol-3-yl)butan-2-amine	?
	5-Methyl-AET	1-(5-methyl-1H-indol-3-yl)butan-2-amine	1380148-21-9
	5-MeO-AET	1-(5-methoxy-1H-indol-3-yl)butan-2-amine	4765-10-0
	7-Methyl-AET	1-(7-methyl-1H-indol-3-yl)butan-2-amine	13712-80-6
	α,N-DMT (SK&F-7024, Ro 3-1715; N-methyl-AMT)	1-(1H-indol-3-yl)-N-methylpropan-2-amine	299-24-1
	N,N-Dimethyl-AMT (α,N,N-TMT)	(2-(1H-Indol-3-yl)-1-methyl-ethyl)dimethylamine	4761-32-4
	N-Hydroxy-AMT (N-HO-AMT)	N-[1-(1H-indol-3-yl)propan-2-yl]hydroxylamine	63-33-2
	N-Methyl-5-MeO-AMT (α,N,O-TMS/α,N,O-trimethyl-5-HT)	[1-(5-methoxy-1H-indol-3-yl)propan-2-yl](methyl)amine	4822-13-3
	N,N-Dimethyl-5-MeO-AMT (5-MeO-α,N,N-TMT)	(2-(5-methoxy-1H-Indol-3-yl)-1-methyl-ethyl)dimethylamine	101831-90-7
	α-Propyltryptamine (APT; αPT; α-PT)	1-(1H-indol-3-yl)pentan-2-amine	
	Indolylpropylaminopentane (IPAP; α,N-DPT)	1-(1H-indol-3-yl)-N-propylpentan-2-amine	
	α-Methyl-DiPT	(2-(1H-Indol-3-yl)-1-methyl-ethyl)diisopropylamine	
	MPMI	3-[(1-methylpyrrolidin-2-yl)methyl]-1H-indole	143321-54-4
	Lucigenol (4-HO-MPMI)	3-(N-methylpyrrolidin-2-ylmethyl)-4-hydoxyindole	?
	5-MeO-MPMI (CP-108509)	5-Methoxy-3-{[(2R)-1-methylpyrrolidin-2-yl]methyl}-1H-indole	143321-57-7
	5-Fluoro-MPMI	5-fluoro-3-[(1-methylpyrrolidin-2-yl)methyl]-1H-indole	?
	5-Bromo-MPMI	5-bromo-3-[(1-methylpyrrolidin-2-yl)methyl]-1H-indole	143322-57-0
	Eletriptan	3-{[(2R)-1-methylpyrrolidin-2-yl]methyl}-5-[2-(benzenesulfonyl)ethyl]-1H-indole	143322-58-1
	Z5247692566	4-[(3,3-dimethyloxolan-2-yl)methyl]-3-[(1H-indol-3-yl)methyl]morpholine	
	BK-NM-AMT (α,N-dimethyl-β-ketotryptamine)	1-(1H-indol-3-yl)-2-(methylamino)propan-1-one	
	BK-5F-NM-AMT (5-fluoro-α,N-dimethyl-β-ketotryptamine)	1-(5-fluoro-1H-indol-3-yl)-2-(methylamino)propan-1-one	
	BK-5Cl-NM-AMT (5-chloro-α,N-dimethyl-β-ketotryptamine)	1-(5-chloro-1H-indol-3-yl)-2-(methylamino)propan-1-one	
	BK-5Br-NM-AMT (5-bromo-α,N-dimethyl-β-ketotryptamine)	1-(5-bromo-1H-indol-3-yl)-2-(methylamino)propan-1-one	

=== List of substituted β-ketotryptamines ===
A number of β-ketotryptamines (beta-ketotryptamines) are known. These compounds are α-alkyl-β-ketotryptamines and are analogous to the cathinones (β-ketoamphetamines) of the related phenethylamine family. Known β-ketotryptamines include BK-NM-AMT, BK-5F-NM-AMT, BK-5Cl-NM-AMT, and BK-5Br-NM-AMT. They act as monoamine releasing agents.

=== Cyclized tryptamines ===
Examples of cyclized tryptamines include:

- β-Carbolines such as harmala alkaloids like harmaline
- Ibogalogs (hexahydroazepinoindoles) such as ibogainalog, tabernanthalog, PNU-22394, and PHA-57378
- Iboga alkaloids like ibogaine, noribogaine, ibogamine, and tabernanthine
- Ergolines and lysergamides such as lysergic acid diethylamide (LSD) and ergot alkaloids like ergine (lysergic acid amide; LSA)
- Partial ergolines and lysergamides like RU-27849, FHATHBIN, NDTDI, and CT-5252
- Mitragyna alkaloids such as mitragynine
- Yohimbans such as Rauvolfia and Corynanthe alkaloids like yohimbine and rauwolscine
- Pyrrolidinylethylindoles like pyr-T, 4-HO-pyr-T, 5-MeO-pyr-T, 4-F-5-MeO-pyr-T, and L-760790
- Pyrrolidinylmethylindoles like MPMI, 4-HO-MPMI (lucigenol), 5F-MPMI, 5-MeO-MPMI, CP-135807, eletriptan, and MSP-2020
- Imidazolylindoles like AGH-107, AGH-192, and AH-494
- Piperidinylethylindoles like pip-T, 5-MeO-pip-T, and indoramin
- Tetrahydropyridinylethylindoles like AHR-1709
- Morpholinylethylindoles like mor-T and 5-MeO-mor-T
- Tetrahydropyridinylindoles like RS134-49, RU-28253, and NEtPhOH-3-THPI
- Pertines (phenylpiperazinylethylindoles) like alpertine, milipertine, oxypertine, and solypertine
- Tetrahydrocarbazolamines like ciclindole, flucindole, frovatriptan, LY-344864, and ramatroban
- Tetrahydropyrroloquinolines like bufothionine, O-methylnordehydrobufotenine, and dehydrobufotenine
- Others like 3-AMTBI, 5-MeO-IsoqT, barettin, cyclic 3-hydroxymelatonin, metralindole, and Z5247692566

Other closely related cyclized tryptamine-like compounds include the following:

- Piperidinylindoles like SN-22, BRL-54443, naratriptan, LY-334370, and sertindole
- Tetrahydropyridinylindoles like RU-24969 (5-MeO-THPI), EMD-386088, MTHPI, 5-MeO-MTHPI, tepirindole, Lu 35-138, and LY-367265
- Tetrahydropyridinylindazoles like VU6067416
- Tetrahydropyridinylpyrrolopyridines like (R)-69, (R)-70, CP-93129, and CP-94253
- Pyridopyrroloquinoxalines (tetracyclic γ-carbolines) like lumateperone, IHCH-7113, IHCH-7086, and ITI-1549

== Related compounds ==
A number of related compounds are known, with a similar structure but having the indole core flipped (isotryptamines) and/or replaced with related cores such as indene, indoline, indazole, indolizine, benzothiophene, or benzofuran. Like tryptamines, these related compounds are primarily active as agonists at the 5-HT_{2} family of serotonin receptors, with applications in the treatment of glaucoma, cluster headaches, or as anorectics.

Structure	Name	Chemical name	CAS #
	C-DMT (1-carba-DMT)	2-(3H-inden-1-yl)-N,N-dimethylethanamine	
	O-DMT (1-oxa-DMT, DMBF)	2-(1-benzofuran-3-yl)-N,N-dimethylethanamine	
	MiPBF (1-oxa-MiPT)	N-[2-(1-benzofuran-3-yl)ethyl]-N-methylpropan-2-amine	
	Dimemebfe (5-MeO-BFE; 1-oxa-5-MeO-DMT)	2-(5-Methoxy-1-benzofuran-3-yl)-N,N-dimethylethanamine	140853-58-3
	5-MeO-DiBF (1-oxa-5-MeO-DiPT)	N-[2-(5-Methoxy-1-benzofuran-3-yl)ethyl]-N-(propan-2-yl)propan-2-amine	
	3-APB (1-oxa-AMT)	3-(2-aminopropyl)benzofuran	105909-13-5
	Mebfap (5-MeO-3-APB; 1-oxa-5-MeO-AMT)	3-(2-aminopropyl)-5-methoxybenzofuran	140853-59-4
	S-DMT (1-thia-DMT)	2-(1-benzothiophen-3-yl)-N,N-dimethylethanamine	10275-64-6
	3-APBT (SKF-6678; 1-thia-AMT)	1-(1-benzothiophen-3-yl)propan-2-amine	1201-27-0
	Isotryptamine (isoT)	2-indol-1-ylethanamine	13708-58-2
	isoAMT	1-indol-1-ylpropan-2-amine	1227465-67-9
	(S)-5,6-Difluoro-isoAMT	(S)-1-(5,6-difluoroindol-1-yl)propan-2-amine	
	Ro60-0175 ((S)-5-F-6-Cl-isoAMT)	(S)-(6-chloro-5-fluoro-1H-indol-1-yl)propan-2-amine	169675-09-6
	isoDMT	2-indol-1-yl-N,N-dimethylethanamine	87482-09-5
	5-MeO-isoDMT	2-(5-methoxyindol-1-yl)-N,N-dimethylethanamine	244122-80-3
	6-MeO-isoDMT	2-(6-methoxyindol-1-yl)-N,N-dimethylethanamine	87482-11-9
	Zalsupindole (DLX-001; AAZ-A-154; (R)-5-MeO-α-Me-isoDMT)	(2R)-1-(5-methoxy-1H-indol-1-yl)-N,N-dimethylpropan-2-amine	2481740-94-5
	2ZEDMA	2-indolizin-1-yl-N,N-dimethylethanamine	
	1ZP2MA	1-indolizin-1-yl-N-methylpropan-2-amine	
	1Z2MAP1O	1-indolizin-3-yl-2-(methylamino)propan-1-one	2110204-31-2
	Example 16	1-(7-methoxyimidazo[1,5-a]pyridin-3-yl)-N,N-dimethylpropan-2-amine	
	Example 1	1-(3-methyl-8,9-dihydropyrano[2,3-g]indol-1(7H)-yl)propan-2-amine	
	VER-3323	(2S)-1-(6-bromo-2,3-dihydroindol-1-yl)propan-2-amine	259857-99-3
	AL-34662 (indazole-5-HO-AMT)	1-((S)-2-Aminopropyl)-1H-indazol-6-ol	210580-75-9
	O-Methyl-AL-34662 (indazole-5-MeO-AMT)	1-((S)-6-methoxy-2-aminopropyl)-1H-indazole	210580-60-2
	7-Methyl-AL-34662	1-((S)-2-Aminopropyl)-7-methyl-1H-indazol-6-ol	874668-67-4
	7-Chloro-AL-34662	1-((S)-2-Aminopropyl)-7-chloro-1H-indazol-6-ol	874881-86-4
	AL-38022A	(S)-2-(8,9-dihydro-7H-pyrano[2,3-g]indazol-1-yl)-1-methylethylamine	478132-11-5
	Example 9	(S)-α-methyl-pyrano[2,3-g]indazole-1(7H)-ethanamine	478132-12-6
	Example 3	(S)-7,8-dihydro-α-methyl-1H-[1,4]dioxino[2,3-g]indazole-1-ethanamine	890087-75-9
	Example 1	(S)-8,9-dihydro-α,9-dimethylpyrazolo[3,4-f][1,4]benzoxazine-1(7H)-ethanamine	1373917-69-1
	YM-348	(2S)-1-(7-ethyl-1H-furo[2,3-g]indazol-1-yl)propan-2-amine	372163-84-3
	2-Desethyl-YM-348	(2S)-1-(1H-furo[2,3-g]indazol-1-yl)propan-2-amine	748116-94-1
	I-32	3-(1-methylpyrrolidin-3-yl)-1H-indol-4-ol	
	2-Azapsilocin (Psilocin indazole analogue, P-6)	3-[2-(dimethylamino)ethyl]-1H-indazol-4-ol	
	4-Aza-5-MeO-DPT (P-11)	N-[2-(5-methoxy-1H-pyrrolo[3,2-b]pyridin-3-yl)ethyl]-N-propylpropan-1-amine	
	5-Aza-4-MeO-DiPT (P-36)	N-[2-(4-methoxy-1H-pyrrolo[3,2-c]pyridin-3-yl)ethyl]-N-(propan-2-yl)propan-2-amine	
	7-Aza-5-MeO-DiPT (P-19)	N-[2-(5-methoxy-1H-pyrrolo[2,3-b]pyridin-3-yl)ethyl]-N-(propan-2-yl)propan-2-amine	
	RS134-49	4-methyl-3-(1,2,3,6-tetrahydropyridin-5-yl)-1H-indole	2945139-94-4
	RU-28253	5-methoxy-3-(1,2,3,6-tetrahydropyridin-5-yl)-1H-indole	?
	NEtPhOH-3-THPI (compound 24c)	3-(1-(2-hydroxyphenylethyl)-1,2,3,6-tetrahydropyridin-5-yl)-1H-indole	?
	VU6067416	3-(1,2,5,6-tetrahydropyridin-3-yl)-5-bromo-1H-indazole	3027515-24-5
	(R)-69	3-[(5R)-5-methyl-1,2,5,6-tetrahydropyridin-3-yl]-1H-pyrrolo[2,3-b]pyridine	2765652-48-8
	(R)-70	3-[(3R)-1,3-dimethyl-3,6-dihydro-2H-pyridin-5-yl]-1H-pyrrolo[2,3-b]pyridine	?
	SN-22	3-(1-methylpiperidin-4-yl)-1H-indole	17403-07-5
	MTHPI	3-(1-methyl-3,6-dihydro-2H-pyridin-4-yl)-1H-indole	17403-03-1
	RU-24969 (5-MeO-THPI)	5-methoxy-3-(1,2,5,6-tetrahydro-4-pyridinyl)-1H-indole	107008-28-6
	EMD-386088	5-chloro-2-methyl-3-(1,2,3,6-tetrahydro-4-pyridinyl)-1H-indole	54635-62-0
	"Compound 6d"	3-(5-(N,N-Dimethylamino)cyclohexen-2-yl)-5-bromoindole	?
	T-70	N,N-dimethyl-2-(6H-thieno[2,3-b]pyrrol-4-yl)ethan-1-amine	?
	T-72	N,N-dimethyl-2-(4H-thieno[3,2-b]pyrrol-6-yl)ethan-1-amine	?
	Gramine	1-(1H-indol-3-yl)-N,N-dimethylmethanamine	87-52-5
	Homotryptamine	3-(1H-indol-3-yl)propan-1-amine	6245-89-2
	Dimethylhomotryptamine (DMHT)	3-(1H-indol-3-yl)-N,N-dimethylpropan-1-amine	13117-35-6
	Benzydamine	3-(1-benzyl-1H-indazol-3-yloxy)-N,N-dimethylpropan-1-amine	642-72-8
	Indalpine	3-(2-piperidin-4-ylethyl)-1H-indole	63758-79-2
	Methylindolylethylpyridine (IN-399)	1-methyl-3-(2-pyridin-4-ylethyl)indole	16571-53-2
	Benzindopyrine (pyrbenzindole; IN-461)	1-benzyl-3-(2-pyridin-4-ylethyl)indole	16571-59-8
	Compound I-5 (Psilocin-Naphthalene)	8-[2-(dimethylamino)ethyl]naphthalen-1-ol	?
	Compound I-1 (5-MeO-DMT-Naphthalene)	2-(7-methoxynaphthalen-1-yl)-N,N-dimethylethanamine	?
	Mefloquine	(S)-[2,8-bis(trifluoromethyl)quinolin-4-yl]-[(2R)-piperidin-2-yl]methanol	51742-87-1

== Overview table ==
Simple tryptamines and their common derivatives
Simple	4-Hydroxy	4-Acetoxy	5-Methoxy	5-Hydroxy
Tryptamine (T)	4-HO-T (dinorpsilocin)	4-AcO-T	5-MeO-T (O-methylserotonin)	5-HO-T (serotonin; 5-HT)
NAcT	4-HO-NAcT	4-AcO-NAcT	5-MeO-NAcT (melatonin)	5-HO-NAcT (normelatonin; NAS)
NMT	4-HO-NMT (norpsilocin)	4-AcO-NMT	5-MeO-NMT	5-HO-NMT (N-methylserotonin)
NET	4-HO-NET	4-AcO-NET	5-MeO-NET	5-HO-NET
NPT	4-HO-NPT	4-AcO-NPT	5-MeO-NPT	5-HO-NPT
NiPT	4-HO-NiPT	4-AcO-NiPT	5-MeO-NiPT	5-HO-NiPT
NALT	4-HO-NALT	4-AcO-NALT	5-MeO-NALT	5-HO-NALT
NBT (NnBT)	4-HO-NBT	4-AcO-NBT	5-MeO-NBT	5-HO-NBT
NiBT	4-HO-NiBT	4-AcO-NiBT	5-MeO-NiBT	5-HO-NiBT
NsBT	4-HO-NsBT	4-AcO-NsBT	5-MeO-NsBT	5-HO-NsBT
NtBT	4-HO-NtBT	4-AcO-NtBT	5-MeO-NtBT	5-HO-NtBT
NAT	4-HO-NAT	4-AcO-NAT	5-MeO-NAT	5-HO-NAT
NHT	4-HO-NHT	4-AcO-NHT	5-MeO-NHT	5-HO-NHT
NcPT	4-HO-NcPT	4-AcO-NcPT	5-MeO-NcPT	5-HO-NcPT
NcHT	4-HO-NcHT	4-AcO-NcHT	5-MeO-NcHT	5-HO-NcHT
NBnT	4-HO-NBnT	4-AcO-NBnT	5-MeO-NBnT	5-HO-NBnT
NBOMeT	4-HO-NBOMeT	4-AcO-NBOMeT	5-MeO-NBOMeT	5-HO-NBOMeT
NB3OMeT	4-HO-NB3OMeT	4-AcO-NB3OMeT	5-MeO-NB3OMeT	5-HO-NB3OMeT
DMT	4-HO-DMT (psilocin)	4-AcO-DMT (psilacetin)	5-MeO-DMT (mebufotenin)	5-HO-DMT (bufotenin)
DET	4-HO-DET (ethocin)	4-AcO-DET (ethacetin)	5-MeO-DET	5-HO-DET
DPT	4-HO-DPT (deprocin)	4-AcO-DPT (depracetin)	5-MeO-DPT	5-HO-DPT (DiPS, NDPS)
DiPT	4-HO-DiPT (iprocin)	4-AcO-DiPT (ipracetin)	5-MeO-DiPT (foxy)	5-HO-DiPT
DALT	4-HO-DALT (daltocin)	4-AcO-DALT (dalcetin)	5-MeO-DALT (foxtrot)	5-HO-DALT
DBT	4-HO-DBT	4-AcO-DBT	5-MeO-DBT	5-HO-DBT
DiBT	4-HO-DiBT	4-AcO-DiBT	5-MeO-DiBT	5-HO-DiBT
DsBT	4-HO-DsBT	4-AcO-DsBT	5-MeO-DsBT	5-HO-DsBT
DtBT	4-HO-DtBT	4-AcO-DtBT	5-MeO-DtBT	5-HO-DtBT
DAT	4-HO-DAT	4-AcO-DAT	5-MeO-DAT	5-HO-DAT
DHT	4-HO-DHT	4-AcO-DHT	5-MeO-DHT	5-HO-DHT
DcPT	4-HO-DcPT	4-AcO-DcPT	5-MeO-DcPT	5-HO-DcPT
MET	4-HO-MET (metocin)	4-AcO-MET (metacetin)	5-MeO-MET	5-HO-MET
MPT	4-HO-MPT (meprocin)	4-AcO-MPT	5-MeO-MPT	5-HO-MPT
MiPT	4-HO-MiPT (miprocin)	4-AcO-MiPT (mipracetin)	5-MeO-MiPT (moxy)	5-HO-MiPT
MALT	4-HO-MALT (maltocin)	4-AcO-MALT	5-MeO-MALT	5-HO-MALT
MBT	4-HO-MBT	4-AcO-MBT	5-MeO-MBT	5-HO-MBT
MiBT	4-HO-MiBT	4-AcO-MiBT	5-MeO-MiBT	5-HO-MiBT
MsBT	4-HO-MsBT	4-AcO-MsBT	5-MeO-MsBT	5-HO-MsBT
MtBT	4-HO-MtBT	4-AcO-MtBT	5-MeO-MtBT	5-HO-MtBT
McPT	4-HO-McPT	4-AcO-McPT	5-MeO-McPT	5-HO-McPT
McPMT	4-HO-McPMT	4-AcO-McPMT	5-MeO-McPMT	5-HO-McPMT
McPeT	4-HO-McPeT	4-AcO-McPeT	5-MeO-McPeT	5-HO-McPeT
EPT	4-HO-EPT (eprocin)	4-AcO-EPT	5-MeO-EPT	5-HO-EPT
EiPT	4-HO-EiPT (eiprocin)	4-AcO-EiPT (ethipracetin)	5-MeO-EiPT	5-HO-EiPT
EALT	4-HO-EALT	4-AcO-EALT	5-MeO-EALT	5-HO-EALT
EBT	4-HO-EBT	4-AcO-EBT	5-MeO-EBT	5-HO-EBT
EiBT	4-HO-EiBT (eibucin)	4-AcO-EiBT	5-MeO-EiBT	5-HO-EiBT
EsBT	4-HO-EsBT	4-AcO-EsBT	5-MeO-EsBT	5-HO-EsBT
EtBT	4-HO-EtBT	4-AcO-EtBT	5-MeO-EtBT	5-HO-EtBT
EcPT	4-HO-EcPT	4-AcO-EcPT	5-MeO-EcPT	5-HO-EcPT
PiPT	4-HO-PiPT (piprocin)	4-AcO-PiPT	5-MeO-PiPT	5-HO-PiPT
PALT	4-HO-PALT	4-AcO-PALT	5-MeO-PALT	5-HO-PALT
PBT	4-HO-PBT	4-AcO-PBT	5-MeO-PBT	5-HO-PBT
PiBT	4-HO-PiBT	4-AcO-PiBT	5-MeO-PiBT	5-HO-PiBT
PsBT	4-HO-PsBT	4-AcO-PsBT	5-MeO-PsBT	5-HO-PsBT
PtBT	4-HO-PtBT	4-AcO-PtBT	5-MeO-PtBT	5-HO-PtBT
PcPT	4-HO-PcPT	4-AcO-PcPT	5-MeO-PcPT	5-HO-PcPT
iPALT (ALiPT)	4-HO-iPALT	4-AcO-iPALT	5-MeO-iPALT (ASR-3001)	5-HO-iPALT
iPBT (BiPT)	4-HO-iPBT	4-AcO-iPBT	5-MeO-iPBT	5-HO-iPBT
iPiBT	4-HO-iPiBT	4-AcO-iPiBT	5-MeO-iPiBT	5-HO-iPiBT
iPsBT	4-HO-iPsBT	4-AcO-iPsBT	5-MeO-iPsBT	5-HO-iPsBT
iPtBT	4-HO-iPtBT	4-AcO-iPtBT	5-MeO-iPtBT	5-HO-iPtBT
iPcPT	4-HO-iPcPT	4-AcO-iPcPT	5-MeO-iPcPT	5-HO-iPcPT
TMT	4-HO-TMT	4-AcO-TMT	5-MeO-TMT	5-HO-TMT
Pyr-T	4-HO-pyr-T	4-AcO-pyr-T	5-MeO-pyr-T	5-HO-pyr-T
Pip-T	4-HO-pip-T	4-AcO-pip-T	5-MeO-pip-T	5-HO-pip-T
Mor-T	4-HO-mor-T	4-AcO-mor-T	5-MeO-mor-T	5-HO-mor-T
MPMI	4-HO-MPMI (lucigenol)	4-AcO-MPMI	5-MeO-MPMI (CP-108509)	5-HO-MPMI
3-THPI	4-HO-3-THPI	4-AcO-3-THPI	5-MeO-3-THPI (RU-28253)	5-HO-3-THPI
IsoqT	4-HO-IsoqT	4-AcO-IsoqT	5-MeO-IsoqT	5-HO-IsoqT
N-DEAOP-NMT	4-HO-N-DEAOP-NMT	4-AcO-N-DEAOP-NMT	5-MeO-N-DEAOP-NMT	5-HO-N-DEAOP-NMT
N-DEAOP-NET	4-HO-N-DEAOP-NET	4-AcO-N-DEAOP-NET	5-MeO-N-DEAOP-NET	5-HO-N-DEAOP-NET
Notes: (1) Other notable acyloxy derivatives of the above include 4-PrO-DMT, 4-PrO-DiPT, 4-PrO-MET, 4-GO-DMT, and 4-GO-DiPT (luvesilocin). (2) 4-Phosphoroxy derivatives of the above include norbaeocystin (4-PO-T), baeocystin (4-PO-NMT), psilocybin (4-PO-DMT), ethocybin (4-PO-DET), 4-PO-DiPT, 4-PO-MET, and aeruginascin (4-PO-TMT). (3) α-Alkyl derivatives of the above are as follows: Tryptamine: AMT, AET, 4-HO-AMT, 4-HO-AET, 5-MeO-AMT, 5-MeO-AET, and 5-HO-AMT (α-methylserotonin); NMT: α,N-DMT and α,N,O-TMS; NPT: IPAP (α,N-DPT); DMT: α,N,N-TMT and α,N,N,O-TeMS; and no others for the rest.

== See also ==
- Arylalkylamine
- Substituted β-carboline
- Ibogalog
- Iboga alkaloid
- Lysergamide
- TiHKAL
- List of miscellaneous 5-HT_{2A} receptor agonists
- Substituted isotryptamine
- Indazolylethylamine
- Indolizinylethylamine
- Tetrahydropyridinylpyrrolopyridine
- Substituted 2-aminoindane
- Substituted amphetamine
- Substituted benzofuran
- Substituted cathinone
- Substituted methylenedioxyphenethylamine
- Substituted phenethylamine
- 2C, DOx, 25-NB
