= 5,6-MeO-MiPT =

Chemical compound

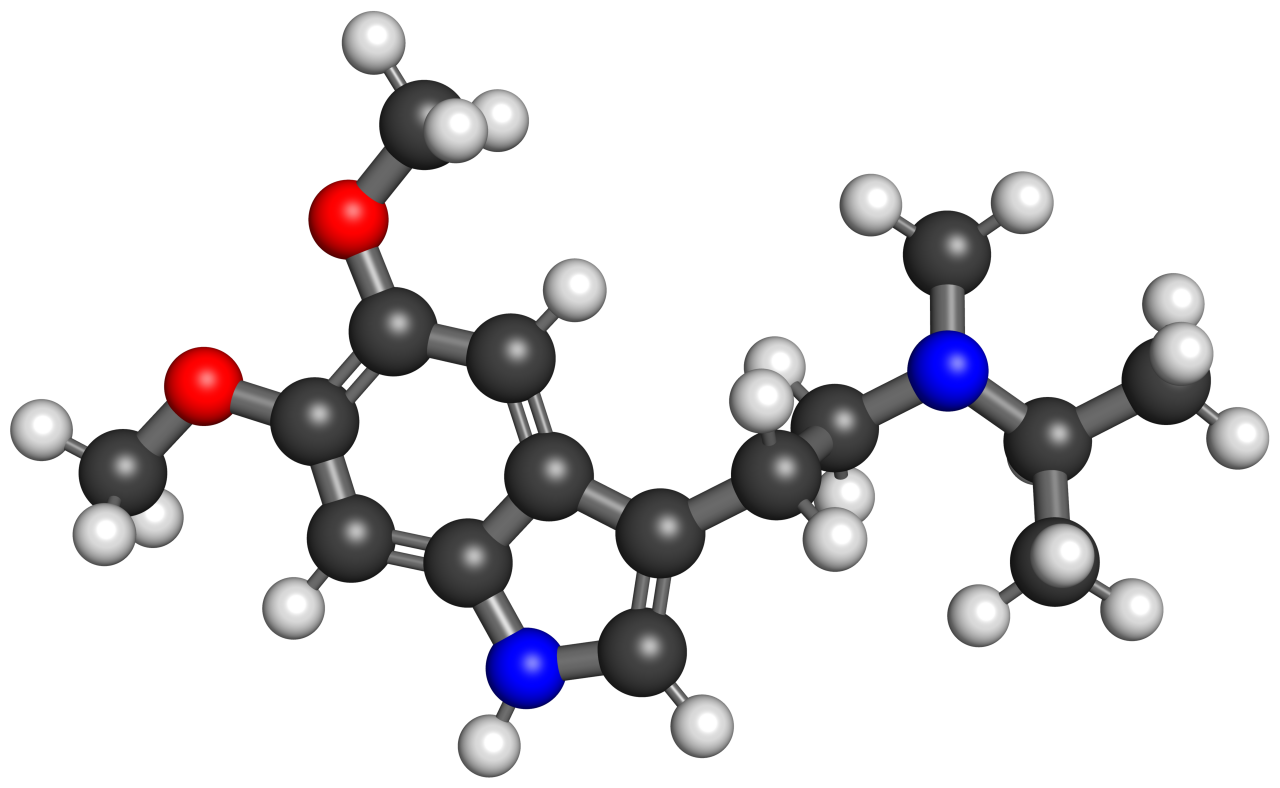

Clinical data
- Other names: 5,6-Dimethoxy-N-methyl-N-isopropyltryptamine
- Routes of administration: Oral
- Drug class: Serotonin receptor modulator
- ATC code: None

Pharmacokinetic data
- Onset of action: Unknown
- Duration of action: Unknown

Identifiers
- IUPAC name: N-[2-(5,6-dimethoxy-1H-indol-3-yl)ethyl]-N-methylpropan-2-amine
- CAS Number: 96096-58-1
- PubChem CID: 44382345
- ChemSpider: 23511916
- UNII: BS78RK38CG
- ChEMBL: ChEMBL172460
- CompTox Dashboard (EPA): DTXSID501336586

Chemical and physical data
- Formula: C_{16}H_{24}N_{2}O_{2}
- Molar mass: 276.380 g·mol^{−1}
- 3D model (JSmol): Interactive image
- SMILES: CC(C)N(C)CCc2c[nH]c1cc(OC)c(OC)cc12
- InChI: InChI=1S/C16H24N2O2/c1-11(2)18(3)7-6-12-10-17-14-9-16(20-5)15(19-4)8-13(12)14/h8-11,17H,6-7H2,1-5H3; Key:XXWWFLAMFUOAQG-UHFFFAOYSA-N

5,6-MeO-MiPT, also known as 5,6-dimethoxy-N-methyl-N-isopropyltryptamine, is a chemical compound of the tryptamine family. It is the 5,6-dimethoxy derivative of methylisopropyltryptamine (MiPT) and is an analogue of 5-MeO-MiPT. In his 1991 book TiHKAL (Tryptamines I Have Known and Loved), Alexander Shulgin listed the dose as greater than 75 mg orally and the duration as unknown. The drug produced few to no effects at doses of up to 75 mg orally. Very little data exists about the pharmacological properties, metabolism, and toxicity of 5,6-MeO-MiPT. However, the drug has been found to have abolished or profoundly reduced affinities for serotonin receptors compared to psychedelic tryptamines like MiPT and 5-MeO-MiPT. Its chemical synthesis has been described. 5,6-MeO-MiPT was first described in the scientific literature by David Repke and Alexander Shulgin and colleagues.

== See also ==
- Substituted tryptamine
