= 4-AcO-McPT =

Clinical data
- Other names: 4-AcO-MCPT; 4-Acetoxy-N-methyl-N-cyclopropyltryptamine
- Drug class: Serotonergic psychedelic; Hallucinogen
- ATC code: None

Identifiers
- IUPAC name: [3-[2-[cyclopropyl(methyl)amino]ethyl]-1H-indol-4-yl] acetate
- PubChem CID: 169222189

Chemical and physical data
- Formula: C_{16}H_{20}N_{2}O_{2}
- Molar mass: 272.348 g·mol^{−1}
- 3D model (JSmol): Interactive image
- SMILES: CC(=O)OC1=CC=CC2=C1C(=CN2)CCN(C)C3CC3
- InChI: InChI=1S/C16H20N2O2/c1-11(19)20-15-5-3-4-14-16(15)12(10-17-14)8-9-18(2)13-6-7-13/h3-5,10,13,17H,6-9H2,1-2H3; Key:LTVOZYTYGWHKES-UHFFFAOYSA-N

4-AcO-McPT, also known as 4-acetoxy-N-methyl-N-cyclopropyltryptamine, is a psychedelic drug of the tryptamine and 4-hydroxytryptamine families related to 4-AcO-DMT (psilacetin). It is the acetate ester of 4-HO-McPT. The drug is assumed to act on serotonin receptors. It was encountered as a novel designer drug in Slovenia in October 2023. 4-AcO-McPT has not otherwise been encountered, for instance on specialized drug forums or being sold by vendors, as of December 2023.

== See also ==
- Substituted tryptamine
- N-Cyclopropyltryptamine (NcPT)
