= Speeter–Anthony route =

Chemical synthesis route

The Speeter–Anthony route, also known as the Speeter–Anthony tryptamine synthesis (STS), is a well-known and widely used chemical synthesis route used in the synthesis of tryptamines, including psychedelic tryptamines like psilocin and 5-MeO-DiPT. It starts with indole or a ring-substituted indole. The scheme of the route is as follows:

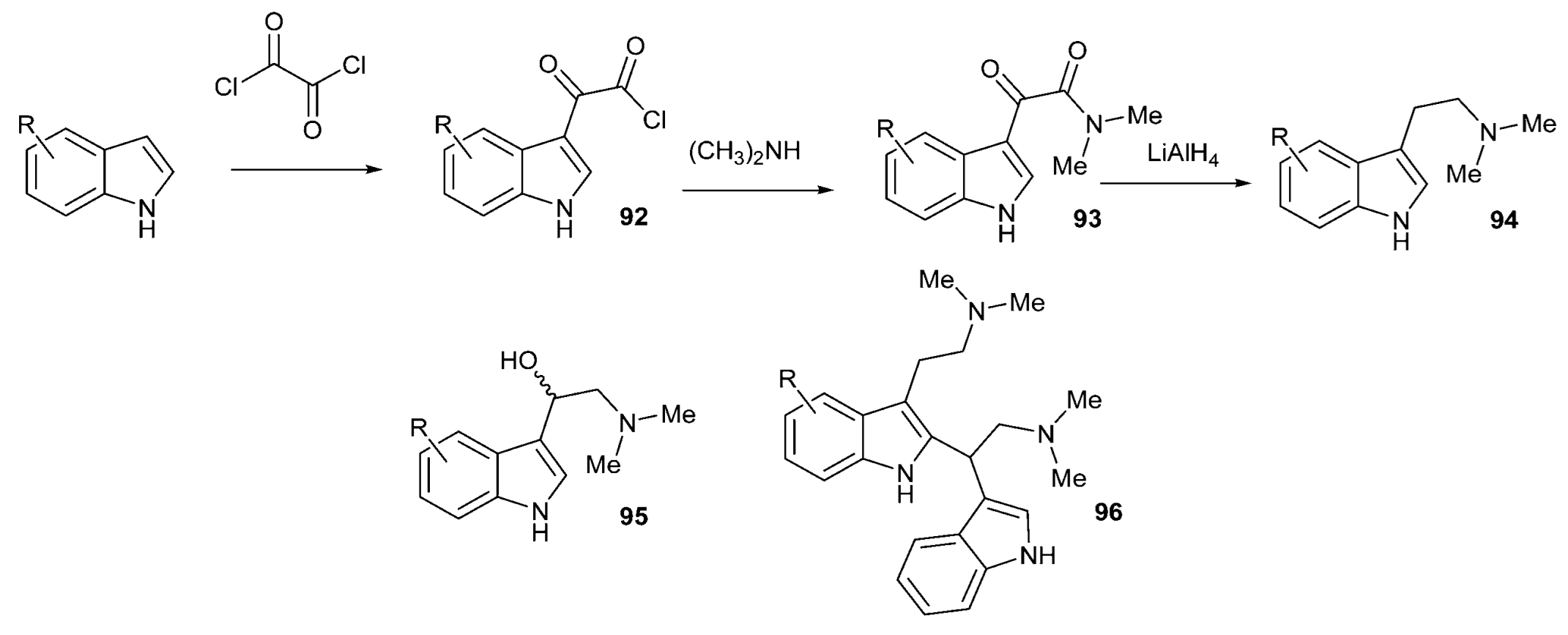

The route was first described by Merrill E. Speeter and William C. Anthony in 1954.

Other tryptamine synthesis routes have also been described, for instance starting with tryptamine rather than indole.
