= 5,6-MDO-MiPT =

Chemical compound

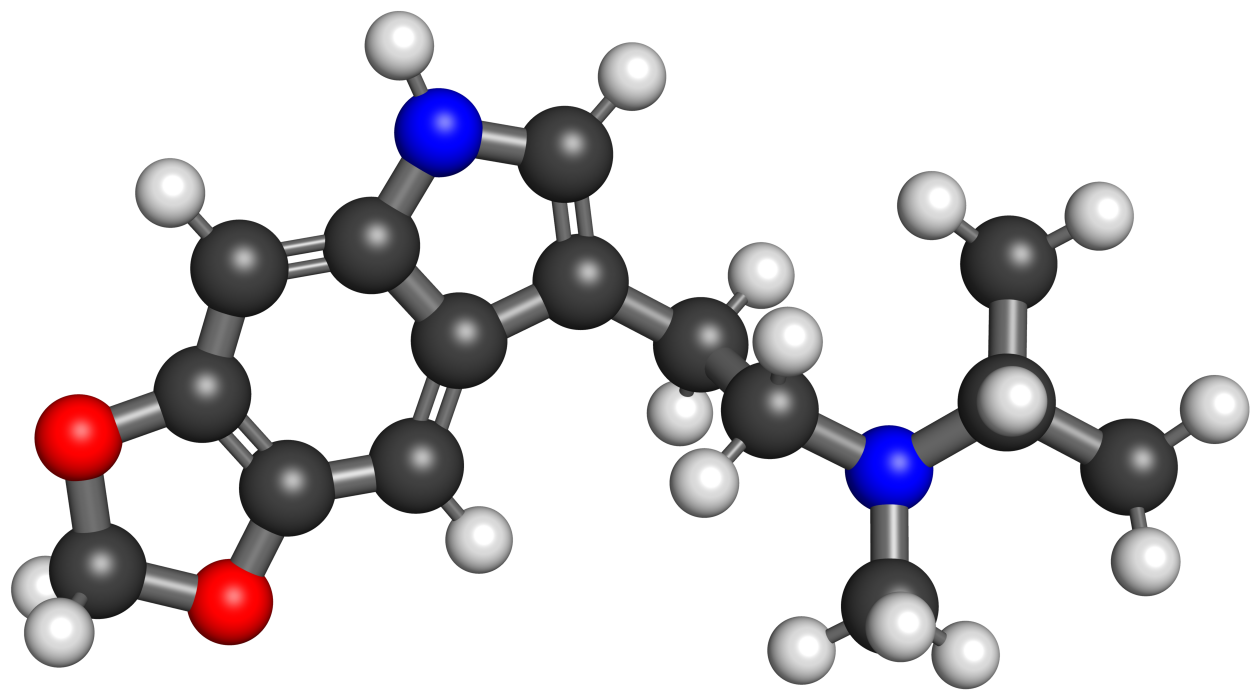

Clinical data
- Other names: 5,6-Methylenedioxy-N-methyl-N-isopropyltryptamine
- Routes of administration: Oral
- ATC code: None

Pharmacokinetic data
- Onset of action: Unknown
- Duration of action: Unknown

Identifiers
- IUPAC name: N-[2-(5H-[1,3]dioxolo[4,5-f]indol-7-yl)ethyl]-N-methylpropan-2-amine
- CAS Number: 88048-28-6
- PubChem CID: 13140997
- ChemSpider: 10524355
- UNII: 3F47P2Y9LC
- CompTox Dashboard (EPA): DTXSID801336585

Chemical and physical data
- Formula: C_{15}H_{20}N_{2}O_{2}
- Molar mass: 260.337 g·mol^{−1}
- 3D model (JSmol): Interactive image
- SMILES: CC(C)N(C)CCC1=CNC2=CC3=C(C=C21)OCO3
- InChI: InChI=1S/C15H20N2O2/c1-10(2)17(3)5-4-11-8-16-13-7-15-14(6-12(11)13)18-9-19-15/h6-8,10,16H,4-5,9H2,1-3H3; Key:OZKGXOZBACDFIQ-UHFFFAOYSA-N

5,6-MDO-MiPT, or 5,6-methylenedioxy-N-methyl-N-isopropyltryptamine, is a lesser-known chemical compound of the tryptamine family. It is the 5,6-methylenedioxy derivative of methylisopropyltryptamine (MiPT) and an analogue of 5-MeO-MiPT. In his 1991 book TiHKAL (Tryptamines I Have Known and Loved), Alexander Shulgin lists the dose range as greater than 50 mg orally and its duration as unknown. The drug produced few to no effects, with effects including parasthesia and lightheadedness, at doses of up to 75 mg orally. Its chemical synthesis has been described. A positional isomer of 5,6-MDO-MiPT, known as 4,5-MDO-MiPT, has also been described, but has not been synthesized nor tested in humans. 5,6-MDO-MiPT was first described in the scientific literature by 1982.

== See also ==
- Substituted tryptamine
