= Methylcyclopropyltryptamine =

McPT

Clinical data
- Other names: McPT; MCPT; N-Methyl-N-cyclopropyltryptamine
- Drug class: Serotonergic psychedelic; Hallucinogen
- ATC code: None

Identifiers
- IUPAC name: N-[2-(1H-indol-3-yl)ethyl]-N-methylcyclopropanamine
- CAS Number: 1373918-63-8
- PubChem CID: 67231643
- ChemSpider: 129325046
- UNII: LW6XEW8248

Chemical and physical data
- Formula: C_{14}H_{18}N_{2}
- Molar mass: 214.312 g·mol^{−1}
- 3D model (JSmol): Interactive image
- SMILES: CN(CCC1=CNC2=CC=CC=C21)C3CC3
- InChI: InChI=1S/C14H18N2/c1-16(12-6-7-12)9-8-11-10-15-14-5-3-2-4-13(11)14/h2-5,10,12,15H,6-9H2,1H3; Key:LVOSBNVSQLXACL-UHFFFAOYSA-N

Methylcyclopropyltryptamine (McPT), also known as N-methyl-N-cyclopropyltryptamine, is a psychedelic drug of the tryptamine family related to dimethyltryptamine (DMT). It was encountered as a novel designer drug in the United Kingdom in August 2015. Known derivatives of McPT include 4-HO-McPT and 4-AcO-McPT.

== See also ==
- Substituted tryptamine
