= 4-HO-NALT =

Chemical compound

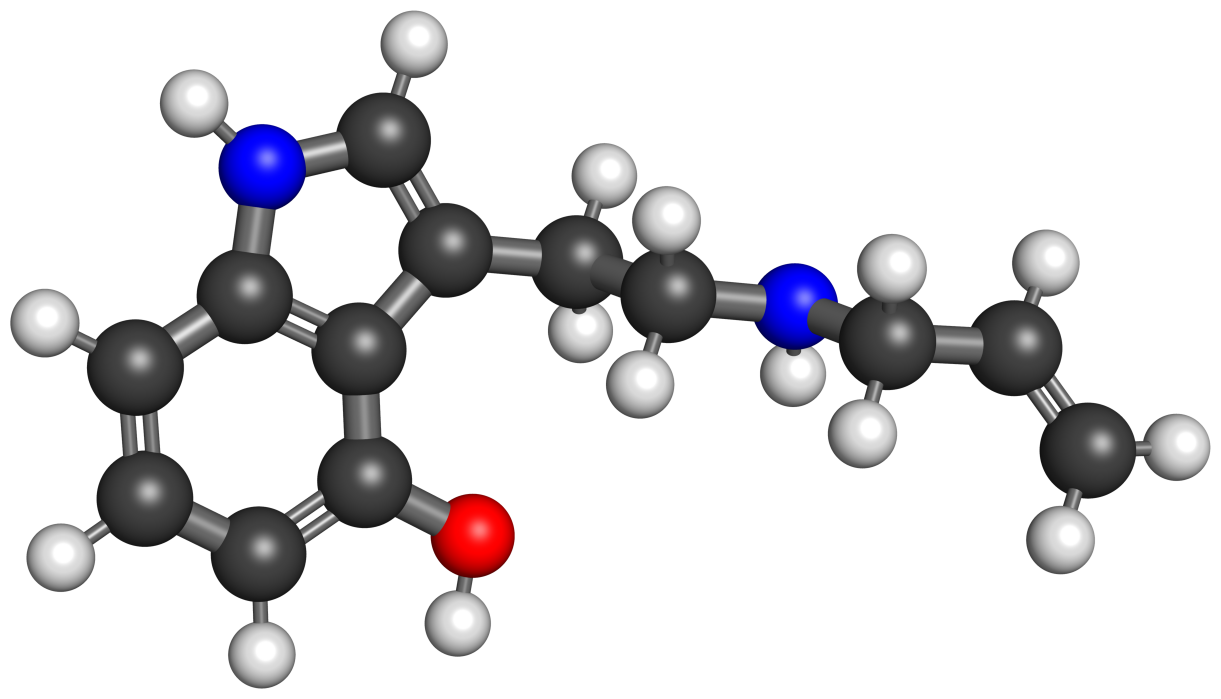

Clinical data
- Other names: 4-HO-NALT; 4-Hydroxy-N-allyltryptamine
- Drug class: Serotonergic psychedelic; Hallucinogen

Identifiers
- IUPAC name: 3-[2-(Prop-2-enylamino)ethyl]-1H-indol-4-ol
- CAS Number: 2767428-88-4
- PubChem CID: 166468743

Chemical and physical data
- Formula: C_{13}H_{16}N_{2}O
- Molar mass: 216.284 g·mol^{−1}
- 3D model (JSmol): Interactive image
- SMILES: C=CCNCCC1=CNC2=C1C(=CC=C2)O
- InChI: InChI=1S/C13H16N2O/c1-2-7-14-8-6-10-9-15-11-4-3-5-12(16)13(10)11/h2-5,9,14-16H,1,6-8H2; Key:QOFKSOQRTVFMAL-UHFFFAOYSA-N

4-HO-NALT, also known as 4-hydroxy-N-allyltryptamine, is a tryptamine derivative developed by modification of norpsilocin (4-HO-NMT). It produces a head-twitch response in mice consistent with psychedelic-like activity, as do the corresponding ethyl, propyl, isopropyl, and benzyl derivatives (4-HO-NET, 4-HO-NPT, 4-HO-NiPT, and 4-HO-NBnT, respectively), but the bulkier t-butyl and cyclohexyl derivatives are inactive.

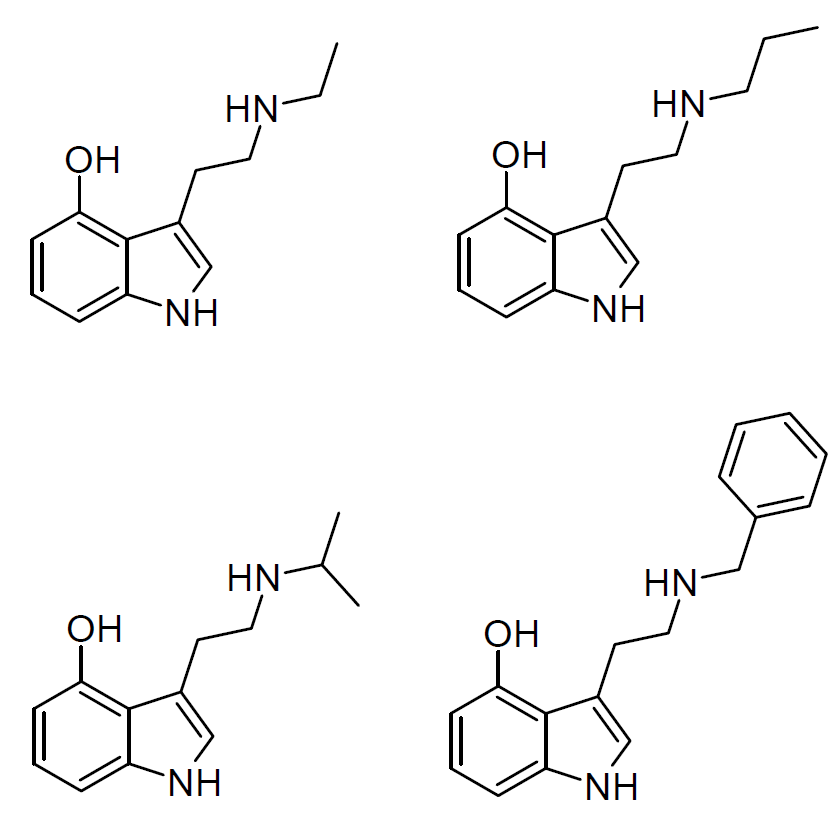
4-HO-NET, 4-HO-NPT, 4-HO-NiPT, and 4-HO-NBnT.

== See also ==
- Substituted tryptamine
- 4-AcO-DALT
- 4-HO-MALT
- 5-HO-DiPT
- 5-MeO-T-NBOMe
- NTBT
