= 4-HO-NBnT =

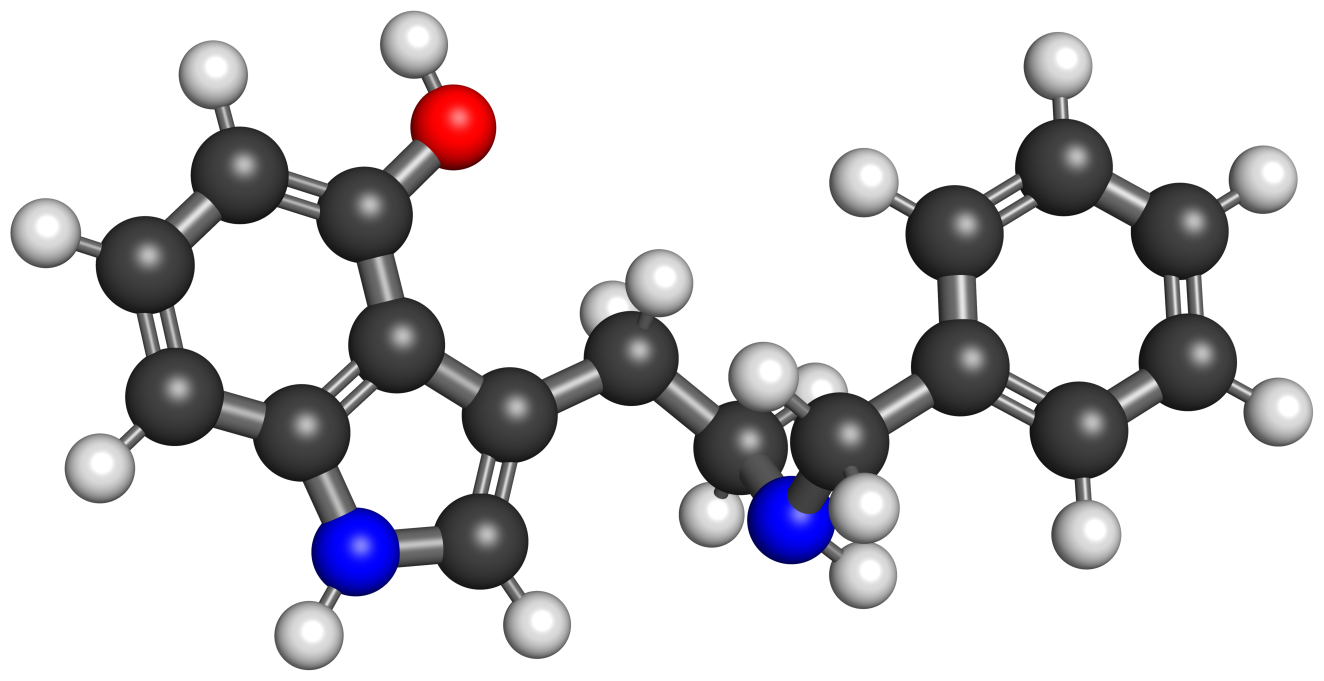

Clinical data
- Other names: 4-OH-NBnT; 4-HO-NB-T; 4-Hydroxy-N-benzyltryptamine
- Drug class: Non-selective serotonin receptor agonist; Serotonin 5-HT_{2A} receptor agonist; Serotonergic psychedelic; Hallucinogen
- ATC code: None

Identifiers
- IUPAC name: 3-[2-(benzylamino)ethyl]-1H-indol-4-ol
- PubChem CID: 163795085

Chemical and physical data
- Formula: C_{17}H_{18}N_{2}O
- Molar mass: 266.344 g·mol^{−1}
- 3D model (JSmol): Interactive image
- SMILES: C1=CC=C(C=C1)CNCCC2=CNC3=C2C(=CC=C3)O
- InChI: InChI=1S/C17H18N2O/c20-16-8-4-7-15-17(16)14(12-19-15)9-10-18-11-13-5-2-1-3-6-13/h1-8,12,18-20H,9-11H2; Key:NABQSXPKKZCYEY-UHFFFAOYSA-N

4-HO-NBnT, also known as 4-hydroxy-N-benzyltryptamine, is a serotonin receptor agonist and putative psychedelic drug of the tryptamine and 4-hydroxytryptamine families related to norpsilocin (4-HO-NMT).

It is a non-selective serotonin receptor agonist, including of the serotonin 5-HT_{2A} receptor. The drug produces psychedelic-like effects in animals.

4-HO-NBnT was first described in the scientific literature in 2024.

== Pharmacology ==
=== Pharmacodynamics ===
4-HO-NBnT is a potent ligand of the serotonin 5-HT_{2A}, 5-HT_{2B}, and 5-HT_{2C} receptors. Of a series of nine N-monoalkyl-4-hydroxytryptamines, it was the most potent agonist of the serotonin 5-HT_{2A} and 5-HT_{2B} receptors. In addition, it was second only to norpsilocin in terms of potency as an agonist of the serotonin 5-HT_{2C} receptor. 4-HO-NBnT acts as a high-efficacy partial agonist of the serotonin 5-HT_{2A} receptor, as a very weak partial agonist or antagonist of the serotonin 5-HT_{2B} receptor, and as a full agonist of the serotonin 5-HT_{2C} receptor. Its EC_{50} and E_{max} values were 2.9 nM (73%) at the serotonin 5-HT_{2A} receptor, 4.9 nM (11%) at the serotonin 5-HT_{2B} receptor, and 70.7 nM (91%) at the serotonin 5-HT_{2C} receptor.

In addition to the serotonin 5-HT_{2} receptors, 4-HO-NBnT shows affinity for and potent partial agonism of other serotonin receptors, including the serotonin 5-HT_{1B}, 5-HT_{1D}, 5-HT_{1E}, and 5-HT_{7A} receptors. In contrast to norpsilocin and psilocin, 4-HO-NBnT was inactive as a serotonin 5-HT_{1A} receptor agonist. It also shows substantial affinity for sigma σ_{1} and σ_{2} receptors (K_{i} = 43.3 nM and 249 nM, respectively).

4-HO-NBnT produces the head-twitch response, a behavioral proxy of psychedelic effects, in rodents. Its potency in inducing the head-twitch response is about 10-fold lower than that of psilocin (4-HO-DMT), but is of about the same maximal efficacy in terms of frequency of head twitches. The production of the head-twitch response with the drug is in contrast to norpsilocin, which does not cause this response even at very high doses. 4-HO-NBnT also produces hypolocomotion and hypothermia in rodents.

== Chemistry ==
4-HO-NBnT, also known as 4-hydroxy-N-benzyltryptamine, is a substituted tryptamine and 4-hydroxytryptamine derivative. It is the 4-hydroxy derivative of N-benzyltryptamine and is related to the naturally occurrence norpsilocin (4-HO-NMT).

=== Properties ===
The calculated log P of 4-HO-NBnT is 2.93. This is far higher than for instance norpsilocin (4-HO-NMT), which had a calculated log P of 0.90.

=== Synthesis ===
The chemical synthesis of 4-HO-NBnT has been described.

=== Analogues ===
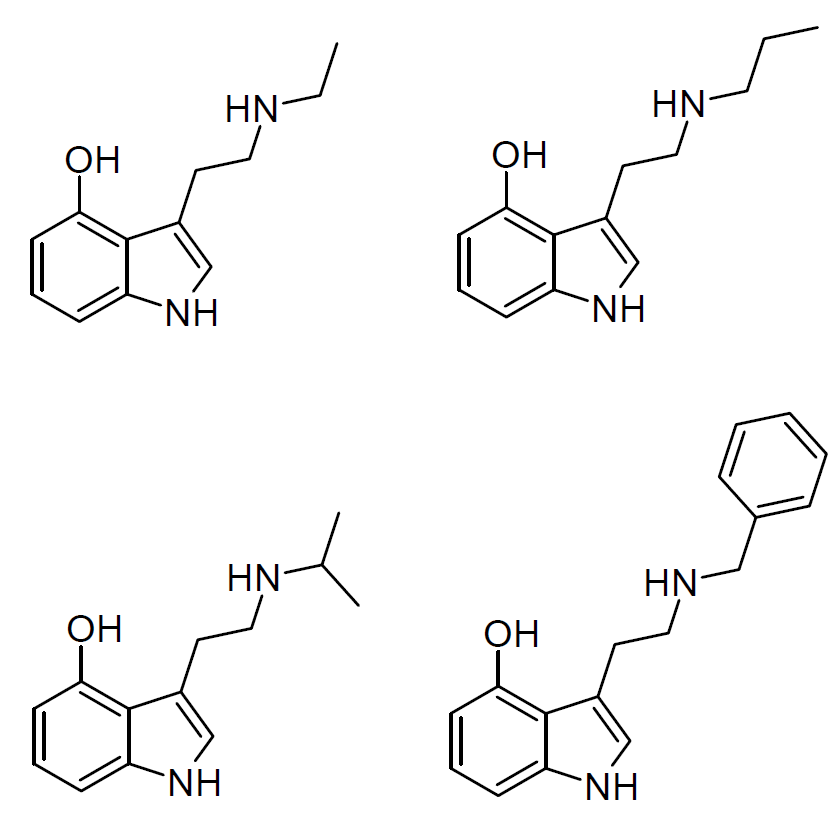
Chemical structures of 4-HO-NET, 4-HO-NPT, 4-HO-NiPT, and 4-HO-NBnT.

Analogues of 4-HO-NBnT include norpsilocin (4-HO-NMT), 4-HO-NET, 4-HO-NPT, 4-HO-NiPT, 4-HO-NALT, 4-HO-NBT (4-HO-NnBT), 4-HO-NtBT, and 4-HO-NcHT, among others.

== History ==
4-HO-NBnT was first described in the scientific literature by Alexander Sherwood and colleagues in 2024.

== See also ==
- Substituted tryptamine
- N-Benzyltryptamine
- 5-MeO-NBnT
- 5-MeO-NBOMeT
- 25-NB (NBOMe)
- 25B-NB (N-benzyl-2C-B)
