= C13H18N2 =

The molecular formula C_{13}H_{18}N_{2} may refer to:

- Medmain
- N-Isopropyltryptamine
- Propyltryptamine
  - N-Propyltryptamine
  - α-Propyltryptamine
- Methylethyltryptamines
  - Methylethyltryptamine (MET; N-methyl-N-ethyltryptamine)
  - 4-Methyl-α-ethyltryptamine
  - 7-Methyl-α-ethyltryptamine
- Dimethylhomotryptamine
- α-Methyl-N-ethyltryptamine
- TC-1698
- Trimethyltryptamines
  - α,N,N-Trimethyltryptamine
  - 2,N,N-Trimethyltryptamine
  - 4,N,N-Trimethyltryptamine
  - 5,N,N-Trimethyltryptamine
  - 6,N,N-Trimethyltryptamine
  - 7,N,N-Trimethyltryptamine
