= C13H18N2O =

The molecular formula C_{13}H_{18}N_{2}O (molar mass : 218.29 g/mol, exact mass : 218.141913) may refer to:

- Bufotenidine
- Eseroline
- Fenoxazoline
- 4-HO-MET
- 5-HO-MET
- 4-HO-NiPT
- 4-HO-NPT
- 5-MeO-isoDMT
- 6-MeO-isoDMT
- Lespedamine
- 5-MeO-AET
- Methoxydimethyltryptamine (MeO-DMT)
  - 4-MeO-DMT
  - 7-MeO-DMT
- 5-MeO-NET
- 5-Methoxy-N,N-dimethyltryptamine, a psychedelic tryptamine
- 1-Methylpsilocin
- RO5256390
- α,N,O-TMS
