= N-Isopropyltryptamine =

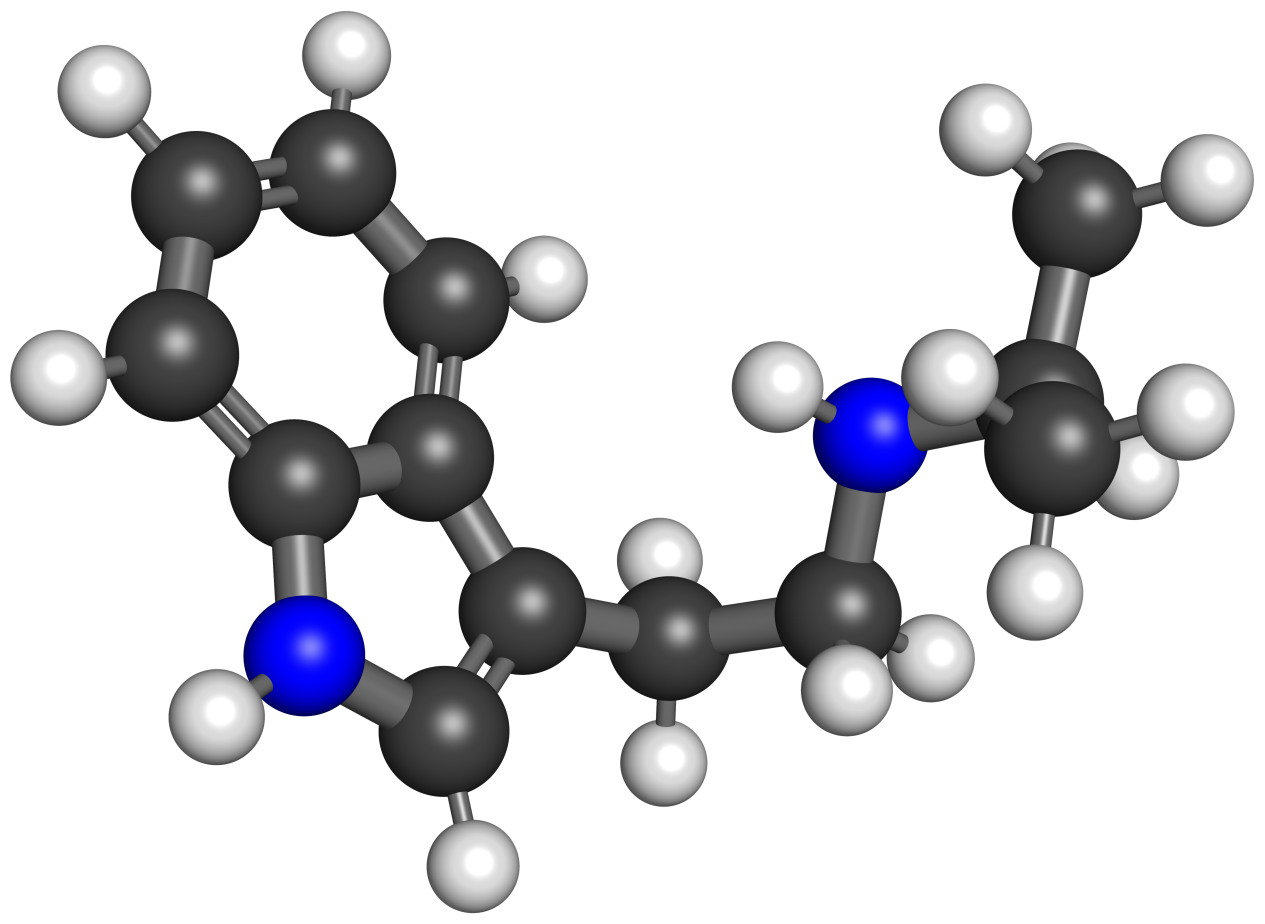

Clinical data
- Other names: NiPT; IPT; N-iP-T
- Drug class: Serotonin receptor agonist; Serotonin 5-HT_{2A} receptor agonist
- ATC code: None

Identifiers
- IUPAC name: N-[2-(1H-indol-3-yl)ethyl]propan-2-amine
- CAS Number: 14121-10-9
- PubChem CID: 45590
- ChemSpider: 41480

Chemical and physical data
- Formula: C_{13}H_{18}N_{2}
- Molar mass: 202.301 g·mol^{−1}
- 3D model (JSmol): Interactive image
- SMILES: CC(C)NCCC1=CNC2=CC=CC=C21
- InChI: InChI=1S/C13H18N2/c1-10(2)14-8-7-11-9-15-13-6-4-3-5-12(11)13/h3-6,9-10,14-15H,7-8H2,1-2H3; Key:QOCRVKNKLPEDCZ-UHFFFAOYSA-N

N-Isopropyltryptamine (NiPT) is a serotonin receptor agonist of the tryptamine family.

== Use and effects ==
According to Alexander Shulgin, no active dose level of NiPT has yet been found in humans.

== Pharmacology ==
=== Pharmacodynamics ===
NiPT acts as a potent full agonist of the serotonin 5-HT_{2A} receptor, whereas it is inactive as an agonist of the serotonin 5-HT_{1A} receptor. The drug is also a weak serotonin reuptake inhibitor.

== Chemistry ==
=== Analogues ===
Analogues of NiPT include N-methyltryptamine (NMT), N-ethyltryptamine (NET, N-sec-butyltryptamine (NsBT), N-tert-butyltryptamine (NtBT), and diisopropyltryptamine (DiPT), among others.

=== Derivatives ===
Some derivatives of NiPT include 4-HO-NiPT, 5-HO-NiPT, and 5-MeO-NiPT, among others. 5-MeO-NiPT is likewise a serotonin receptor agonist. It is a potent full agonist or high-efficacy partial agonist of the serotonin 5-HT_{1A}, 5-HT_{2A}, 5-HT_{2B}, and 5-HT_{2C} receptors. In contrast to 5-MeO-NMT and 5-MeO-NET, which are inactive in the test, 5-MeO-NiPT induces the head-twitch response, a behavioral proxy of psychedelic effects, in rodents, and hence may be hallucinogenic in humans. 4-HO-NiPT is also a serotonin receptor agonist and produces the head-twitch response in rodents as well.

== Society and culture ==
=== Legal status ===
==== Canada ====
NiPT is not a controlled substance in Canada as of 2025.

== See also ==
- Substituted tryptamine
