= C14H20N2 =

The molecular formula C_{14}H_{20}N_{2} may refer to:

- Cipralisant
- Diethyltryptamine, a psychedelic drug
- 1-Methylmedmain
- 5-Ethyl-DMT
- N-Methyl-N-isopropyltryptamine
- N-t-Butyltryptamine
- N-sec-Butyltryptamine
- Methylpropyltryptamine
