= C18H20N2O =

The molecular formula C_{18}H_{20}N_{2}O (molar mass: 280.371 g/mol) may refer to:

- 5-MeO-NBnT
- T-NBOMe
