= C19H22N2O2 =

The molecular formula C_{19}H_{22}N_{2}O_{2} may refer to:

- 5-MeO-T-NBOMe
- 5-MeO-T-NB3OMe
- Wieland-Gumlich aldehyde
