= 5-MeO-NMT =

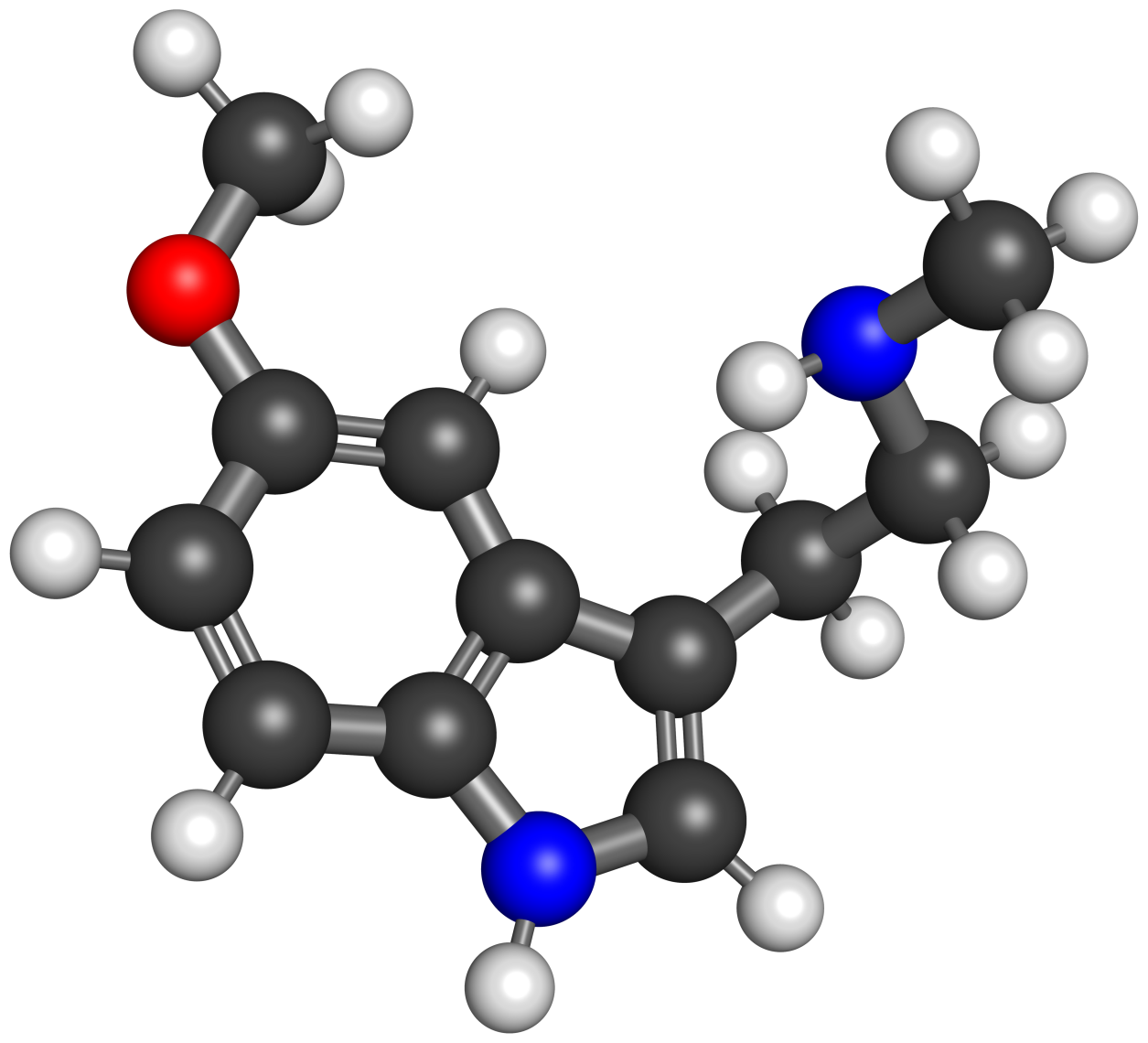

Clinical data
- Other names: 5-OMe-NMT; 5-Methoxy-N-methyltryptamine
- Drug class: Serotonin receptor agonist; Serotonin 5-HT_{2A} receptor agonist; Serotonin releasing agent
- ATC code: None

Identifiers
- IUPAC name: 2-(5-methoxy-1H-indol-3-yl)-N-methylethan-1-amine
- CAS Number: 2009-03-2 (free base) 2426-68-8 (hydrochloride)
- PubChem CID: 16184
- ChemSpider: 15360
- UNII: YBO217L5YV
- ChEBI: CHEBI:189635
- ChEMBL: ChEMBL58579
- CompTox Dashboard (EPA): DTXSID40173909

Chemical and physical data
- Formula: C_{12}H_{16}N_{2}O
- Molar mass: 204.273 g·mol^{−1}
- 3D model (JSmol): Interactive image
- SMILES: CNCCC1=CNC2=CC=C(C=C21)OC
- InChI: InChI=1S/C12H16N2O/c1-13-6-5-9-8-14-12-4-3-10(15-2)7-11(9)12/h3-4,7-8,13-14H,5-6H2,1-2H3; Key:NFDDCRIHMZGWBP-UHFFFAOYSA-N

5-MeO-NMT, also known as 5-methoxy-N-methyltryptamine, is an tryptamine alkaloid, being the 5-methoxy analogue of N-methyltryptamine (NMT). It was first isolated from Phalaris arundinacea (reed canary grass) and also occurs in other species such as Virola species and Bufo alvarius skin. The compound has been synthesized by Alexander Shulgin and reported in his book TiHKAL (Tryptamines I Have Known and Loved).

== Use and effects ==
Alexander Shulgin included 5-MeO-NMT as an entry in his book TiHKAL (Tryptamines I Have Known and Loved). However, he does not appear to have tested it and states that the dose and duration of the compound are unknown. In any case, Shulgin stated that it would be expected to be rapidly metabolized by monoamine oxidase and that it would likely only be active parenterally.

== Pharmacology ==
=== Pharmacodynamics ===
5-MeO-NMT activities
Target	Affinity (K_{i}, nM)
5-HT_{1A}	7.9 (K_{i}); 1.1–220 (EC_{50}); 72–111% (E_{max})
5-HT_{1B}	23
5-HT_{1D}	3
5-HT_{1E}	212
5-HT_{2A}	79 (K_{i}); 3.8–6.4 (EC_{50}); 84–113% (E_{max})
5-HT_{2B}	11 (K_{i}); 8.8–12 (EC_{50}); 94% (E_{max})
5-HT_{2C}	116 (K_{i}); 1.2–13 (EC_{50}); 104% (E_{max})
5-HT_{3}	IA
5-HT_{5A}	60
5-HT_{6}	25
5-HT_{7}	7
α_{2A}	1,543
D_{4}	885
SERT	1,114^{a} (EC_{50})
NET	>10,000^{a} (EC_{50})
DAT	>10,000^{a} (EC_{50})
Notes: The smaller the value, the more avidly the drug interacts with the site. Footnotes: ^{a} = Neurotransmitter release. Sources:

5-MeO-NMT is a potent agonist of the serotonin 5-HT_{1A}, 5-HT_{2A}, 5-HT_{2B}, and 5-HT_{2C} receptors. It is a full agonist or near-full agonist of all of these receptors except for the serotonin 5-HT_{1A} receptor, where it is a partial agonist. It additionally displays a high affinity for multiple other serotonin receptors. The drug is also a very weak serotonin releasing agent and has sub micromolar affinity for dopamine D_{4} receptor.

There is conflicting data on its effects in mammals. In a study in 1964, Taborsky and McIsaac found 5-methoxy-NMT to have a 'moderately disruptive effect on conditioned behavior' in rats. Another study found it does not produce the head-twitch response, a behavioral proxy of psychedelic effects, in rodents, and in some cases even reduced total HTRs. On the other hand, it does induce serotonin 5-HT_{1A} receptor-mediated hypothermia and hypolocomotion. Earlier reports had stated that 5-MeO-NMT and its N-demethylated analogue 5-methoxytryptamine were inactive, but this proved not to be the case.

== Chemistry ==
=== Synthesis ===
The chemical synthesis of 5-MeO-NMT has been described.

=== Analogues ===
Notable analogues of 5-MeO-NMT include NMT, 5-MeO-NET, 5-MeO-NiPT, norpsilocin (4-HO-NMT), baeocystin (4-PO-NMT), 4-HO-NALT, and 5-MeO-NBpBrT, among others. 5-MeO-NMT is the N-monodemethylated analogue of 5-MeO-DMT.

== Society and culture ==
=== Legal status ===
==== United States ====
In the United States, 5-MeO-NMT is an unscheduled substance at the federal level. It may be considered illegal under the federal analog act if it's intended for human consumption if a judge/jury considers it an analog of the Schedule I substance Bufotenin.

== See also ==
- Substituted tryptamine
