= T-NBOMe =

Clinical data
- Other names: TNBOMe; NBOMe-T; NBOMe-tryptamine; Tryptamine-NBOMe; N-(2-Methoxybenzyl)tryptamine
- Drug class: Serotonin receptor modulator; Serotonin 5-HT_{2A} receptor agonist; Possible psychedelic drug
- ATC code: None

Identifiers
- IUPAC name: 2-(1H-indol-3-yl)-N-[(2-methoxyphenyl)methyl]ethanamine
- CAS Number: 418781-81-4
- PubChem CID: 1988048
- ChemSpider: 1511014

Chemical and physical data
- Formula: C_{18}H_{20}N_{2}O
- Molar mass: 280.371 g·mol^{−1}
- 3D model (JSmol): Interactive image
- SMILES: COC1=CC=CC=C1CNCCC2=CNC3=CC=CC=C32
- InChI: InChI=1S/C18H20N2O/c1-21-18-9-5-2-6-15(18)12-19-11-10-14-13-20-17-8-4-3-7-16(14)17/h2-9,13,19-20H,10-12H2,1H3; Key:HJCSKFSDXDPIKM-UHFFFAOYSA-N

T-NBOMe, or TNBOMe, also known as NBOMe-T, NBOMe-tryptamine, or N-(2-methoxybenzyl)tryptamine, is a serotonin receptor modulator and possible psychedelic drug of the tryptamine family. It is the N-(2-methoxybenzyl) derivative of tryptamine.

The drug shows affinity for the serotonin 5-HT_{2} receptors, including for the serotonin 5-HT_{2A}, 5-HT_{2B}, and 5-HT_{2C} receptors (K_{i} = 89 nM, 47 nM, and 224 nM, respectively). It shows 46-fold higher affinity for the serotonin 5-HT_{2A} receptor than tryptamine (K_{i} = 89 nM vs. 4,074 nM, respectively). T-NBOMe acts as a partial agonist of the serotonin 5-HT_{2A} receptor (EC_{50} = 1,549 nM; E_{max} = 63%) and as a near-full agonist of the serotonin 5-HT_{2C} receptor (EC_{50} = 35 nM; E_{max} = 94%), with 44-fold preference for activation of the serotonin 5-HT_{2C} receptor over the serotonin 5-HT_{2A} receptor. Whereas T-NBOMe had much higher affinity for the serotonin 5-HT_{2A} receptor than tryptamine, it showed 89-fold lower activational potency at the serotonin 5-HT_{2A} receptor than tryptamine and also had lower activational efficacy at the receptor. In an earlier study however, T-NBOMe showed much greater potency as an agonist of the serotonin 5-HT_{2A} receptor (EC_{50} = 155 nM; E_{max} = 44%).

The chemical synthesis of T-NBOMe has been described.

T-NBOMe was first described in the scientific literature by Ralf Heim and colleagues in 1999. It emerged as a novel designer drug by early 2024. However, the properties and effects of T-NBOMe in humans are unknown and it is unclear whether T-NBOMe actually produces hallucinogenic effects.

== See also ==
- Substituted tryptamine
- N-Benzyltryptamine (T-NB; NBnT)
- 5-MeO-T-NBOMe
- 5-MeO-T-NB3OMe
- NEtPhOH-THPI
