= 4-HO-NiPT =

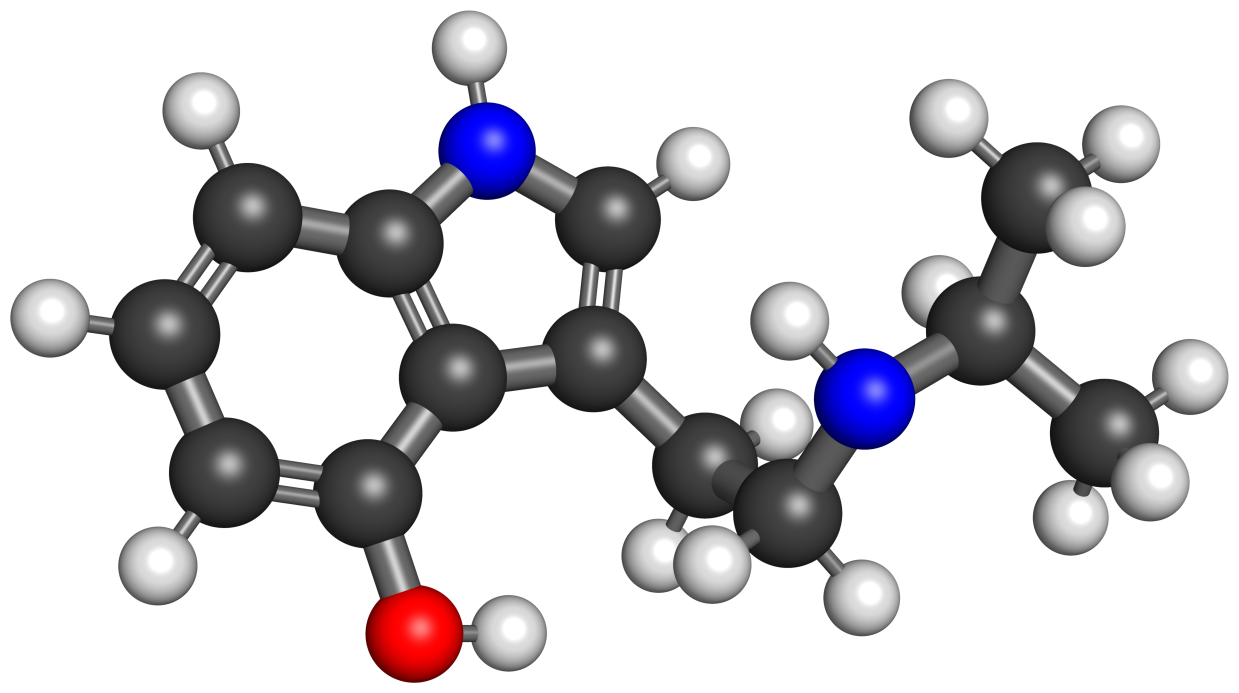

Clinical data
- Other names: 4-Hydroxy-N-isopropyltryptamine; 4-Hydroxy-NiPT; 4-HO-NIPT
- Drug class: Serotonin receptor modulator; Serotonin 5-HT_{2A} receptor agonist; Serotonergic psychedelic; Hallucinogen
- ATC code: None

Identifiers
- IUPAC name: 3-[2-(propan-2-ylamino)ethyl]-1H-indol-4-ol
- PubChem CID: 166468730

Chemical and physical data
- Formula: C_{13}H_{18}N_{2}O
- Molar mass: 218.300 g·mol^{−1}
- 3D model (JSmol): Interactive image
- SMILES: CC(C)NCCC1=CNC2=C1C(=CC=C2)O
- InChI: InChI=1S/C13H18N2O/c1-9(2)14-7-6-10-8-15-11-4-3-5-12(16)13(10)11/h3-5,8-9,14-16H,6-7H2,1-2H3; Key:YJBOZZRZZJEXDB-UHFFFAOYSA-N

4-HO-NiPT, also known as 4-hydroxy-N-isopropyltryptamine, is a serotonin receptor modulator and putative psychedelic drug of the tryptamine and 4-hydroxytryptamine families related to psilocin (4-HO-DMT). It is an analogue of 4-HO-MiPT (miprocin) and 4-HO-DiPT (iprocin) and a derivative of norpsilocin (4-HO-NMT) and 4-HO-NET. The drug has been encountered online as a possible novel designer drug.

== Use and effects ==
4-HO-NiPT was not included nor mentioned in Alexander Shulgin's book TiHKAL (Tryptamines I Have Known and Loved).

== Pharmacology ==
=== Pharmacodynamics ===
4-HO-NiPT shows affinity for serotonin receptors, including for the serotonin 5-HT_{1D}, 5-HT_{1E}, 5-HT_{2A}, 5-HT_{2B}, 5-HT_{2C}, 5-HT_{6}, and 5-HT_{7} receptors (K_{i} = 229–2,461 nM). Conversely, it did not show affinity for the serotonin 5-HT_{1B} or 5-HT_{5A} receptors, whereas the serotonin 5-HT_{1A} receptor was not reported. 4-HO-NiPT is a partial agonist of the serotonin 5-HT_{2A}, 5-HT_{2B}, and 5-HT_{2C} receptors, with EC_{50} (E_{max}) values of 24 nM (88.4%), 188 nM (69.9%), and 963 nM (45.2%), respectively. It was also a weak agonist of other serotonin receptors, including the serotonin 5-HT_{1B}, 5-HT_{1E}, 5-HT_{1F}, and 5-HT_{7A} receptors (EC_{50} = 1,400–23,000 nM, E_{max} = 20.4–123%), but not of the 5-HT_{1A}, 5-HT_{1D}, 5-HT_{4}, 5-HT_{5A}, or 5-HT_{6} receptors.

In contrast to norpsilocin, but similarly to psilocin and certain other N-monoalkyltryptamines like 4-HO-NET, 4-HO-NPT, 4-HO-NALT, and 4-HO-NBnT, the drug produces the head-twitch response, a behavioral proxy of psychedelic effects, in rodents. It showed 30-fold lower potency than psilocin in this action in mice, but produced about the same maximal response. Similarly to 4-HO-NiPT, other N-monoalkyltryptamines were also much less potent than psilocin, in the range of 10- to 26-fold less potent. In addition to the head-twitch response, 4-HO-NiPT produces hypothermia in rodents.

4-HO-NiPT is a known metabolite of 4-AcO-DiPT and presumably also of 4-HO-DiPT.

== Chemistry ==
=== Synthesis ===
The chemical synthesis of 4-HO-NiPT has been described.

=== Analogues ===
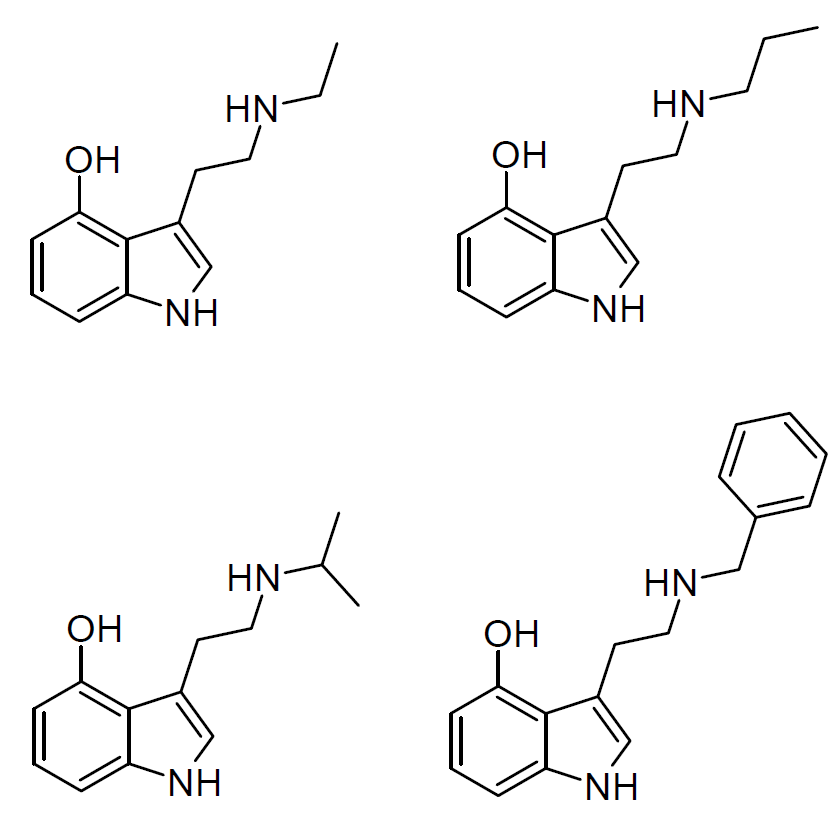
4-HO-NET, 4-HO-NPT, 4-HO-NiPT, and 4-HO-NBnT.

Analogues of 4-HO-NiPT include 4-hydroxytryptamine (4-HT or 4-HO-T), 4-HO-MiPT (miprocin), 4-HO-DiPT (diprocin), psilocin (4-HO-DMT), norpsilocin (4-HO-NMT), 4-HO-NET, 4-HO-NPT, 4-HO-NALT, and 4-HO-NBnT, among others.

== History ==
4-HO-NiPT was first described in the scientific literature, as a metabolite of 4-AcO-DiPT, in 2022. Subsequently, its synthesis was described in 2023 and its pharmacology was reported in 2024. The drug was reported as a possible novel designer drug online in 2022.

== See also ==
- Substituted tryptamine
