= 5-MeO-NiPT =

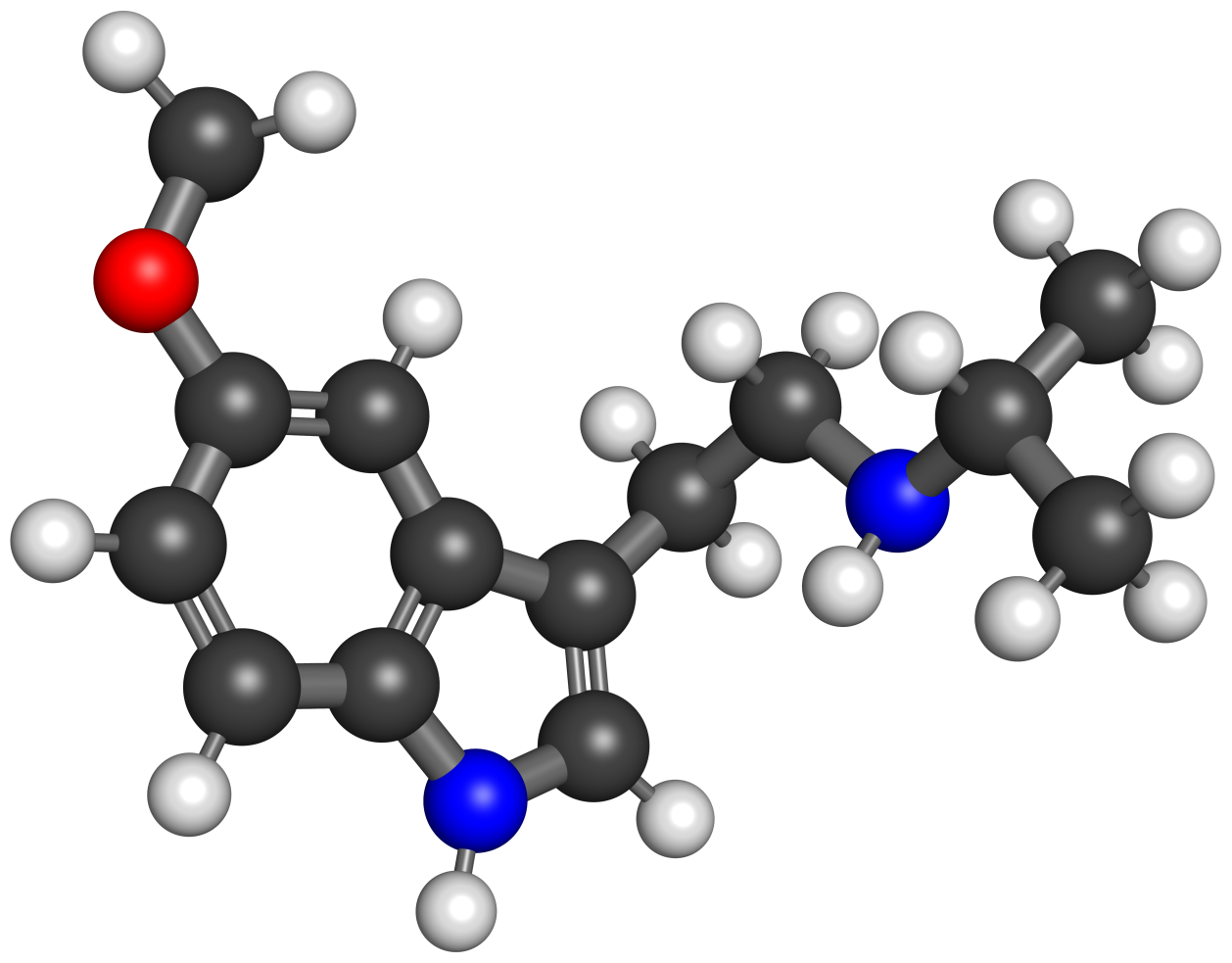

Clinical data
- Other names: 5-Methoxy-N-isopropyltryptamine
- Drug class: Serotonin receptor agonist; Serotonin 5-HT_{2A} receptor agonist; Serotonergic psychedelic; Hallucinogen
- ATC code: None

Identifiers
- IUPAC name: N-[2-(5-methoxy-1H-indol-3-yl)ethyl]propan-2-amine
- CAS Number: 109921-55-3
- PubChem CID: 707167
- ChemSpider: 616592
- UNII: CEP4J0P21U
- CompTox Dashboard (EPA): DTXSID00351701

Chemical and physical data
- Formula: C_{14}H_{20}N_{2}O
- Molar mass: 232.327 g·mol^{−1}
- 3D model (JSmol): Interactive image
- SMILES: COc1ccc2c(c1)c(CCNC(C)C)c[nH]2
- InChI: InChI=1S/C14H20N2O/c1-10(2)15-7-6-11-9-16-14-5-4-12(17-3)8-13(11)14/h4-5,8-10,15-16H,6-7H2,1-3H3; Key:QQZJNZJNPDORBO-UHFFFAOYSA-N

5-MeO-NiPT, also known as 5-methoxy-N-isopropyltryptamine, is a psychedelic drug of the tryptamine family related to 5-MeO-DMT.

The drug acts as a non-selective serotonin receptor agonist, including of the serotonin 5-HT_{2A} receptor.

5-MeO-NiPT was encountered as a novel designer and recreational drug by 2014.

== Use and effects ==
5-MeO-NiPT was not included nor mentioned in Alexander Shulgin's book TiHKAL (Tryptamines I Have Known and Loved).

== Pharmacology ==
=== Pharmacodynamics ===
5-MeO-NiPT is a full agonist or near-full agonist of the serotonin 5-HT_{1A}, 5-HT_{2A}, 5-HT_{2B}, and 5-HT_{2C} receptors. It is inactive as a serotonin releasing agent and is very weak as a serotonin reuptake inhibitor.

Unlike most other N-monoalkylated tryptamines, 5-MeO-NiPT produces the head-twitch response (HTR), a behavioral proxy of psychedelic effects, in rodents, albeit relatively weakly. It also produces hypolocomotion and hypothermia in rodents. In combination with the serotonin 5-HT_{1A} receptor antagonist WAY-100635 however, 5-MeO-NiPT instead produces hyperlocomotion.

5-MeO-NiPT is an active metabolite of 5-MeO-MiPT and 5-MeO-DiPT.

== Chemistry ==
=== Analogues ===
Analogues of 5-MeO-NiPT include N-isopropyltryptamine (NiPT), 5-MeO-NMT, 5-MeO-NET, 5-MeO-DiPT, and 5-MeO-MiPT, among others.

== Society and culture ==
=== Legal status ===
==== Canada ====
5-MeO-NiPT is not a controlled substance in Canada.

==== Sweden ====
5-MeO-NiPT is a controlled substance in Sweden.

==== United States ====
5-MeO-NiPT is not an explicitly controlled substance in the United States. However, it could be considered a controlled substance under the Federal Analogue Act if intended for human consumption.

== See also ==
- Substituted tryptamine
