= N-sec-Butyltryptamine =

Psychoactive drug

NsBT

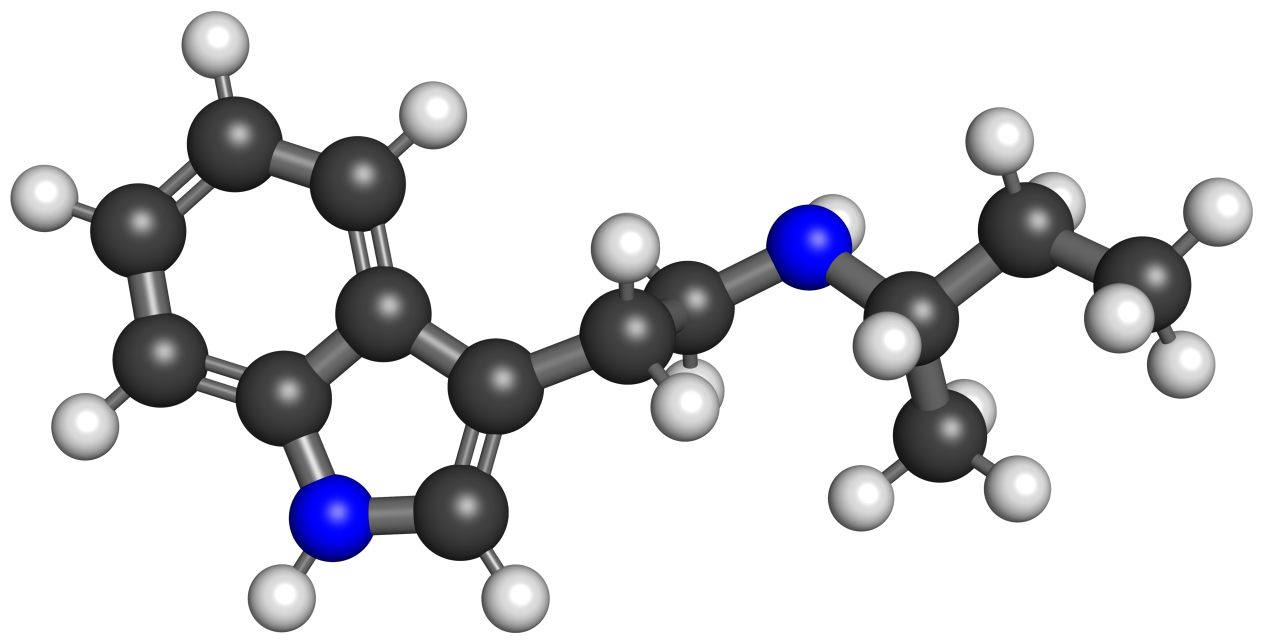

Clinical data
- Other names: NsBT; NSBT
- Routes of administration: Oral
- Drug class: Psychoactive drug
- ATC code: None

Pharmacokinetic data
- Duration of action: "Short"

Identifiers
- IUPAC name: N-[2-(1H-indol-3-yl)ethyl]butan-2-amine
- PubChem CID: 24839509
- ChemSpider: 23993854

Chemical and physical data
- Formula: C_{14}H_{20}N_{2}
- Molar mass: 216.328 g·mol^{−1}
- 3D model (JSmol): Interactive image
- SMILES: CCC(C)NCCC1=CNC2=CC=CC=C21
- InChI: InChI=1S/C14H20N2/c1-3-11(2)15-9-8-12-10-16-14-7-5-4-6-13(12)14/h4-7,10-11,15-16H,3,8-9H2,1-2H3; Key:WDWNZOAFDWLAGZ-UHFFFAOYSA-N

N-sec-Butyltryptamine (NsBT) is a psychoactive drug of the tryptamine family related to psychedelics like dimethyltryptamine (DMT).

== Use and effects ==
NsBT was briefly described by Alexander Shulgin in his 1997 book TiHKAL (Tryptamines I Have Known and Loved). According to Shulgin, NsBT is active at a dose of 25 to 75 mg orally and has a short-lived duration. Its effects included a generalized and somewhat diffuse intoxication, intellectual excitement, modest sensory enhancements, and "a lot of erotic horniness". However, no "plus-three" ratings occurred on the Shulgin Rating Scale.

Shulgin has said that along with N-tert-butyltryptamine (NtBT), it is one of only two N-mono-substituted tryptamines with known psychoactivity. He also said that N-mono-substituted tryptamines might be GHB-like intoxicants devoid of psychedelic effects. However, N-methyltryptamine (NMT) has been reported to produce psychedelic effects.

== Chemistry ==
=== Analogues ===
Analogues of NsBT include 5-MeO-NsBT, N-methyltryptamine (NMT), N-ethyltryptamine (NET), N-isopropyltryptamine (NiPT), N-benzyltryptamine (NBnT), N-methyl-N-sec-butyltryptamine (MsBT), among others.

== Society and culture ==
=== Legal status ===
==== Canada ====
NsBT is not a controlled substance in Canada as of 2025.

== See also ==
- Substituted tryptamine
