= NSBT =

NSBT may refer to:

- New Studies in Biblical Theology, book series
- Clem Jones Tunnel, previously known as the North–South Bypass Tunnel
- N-sec-Butyltryptamine, a psychedelic drug
