= N-tert-Butyltryptamine =

Psychoactive drug

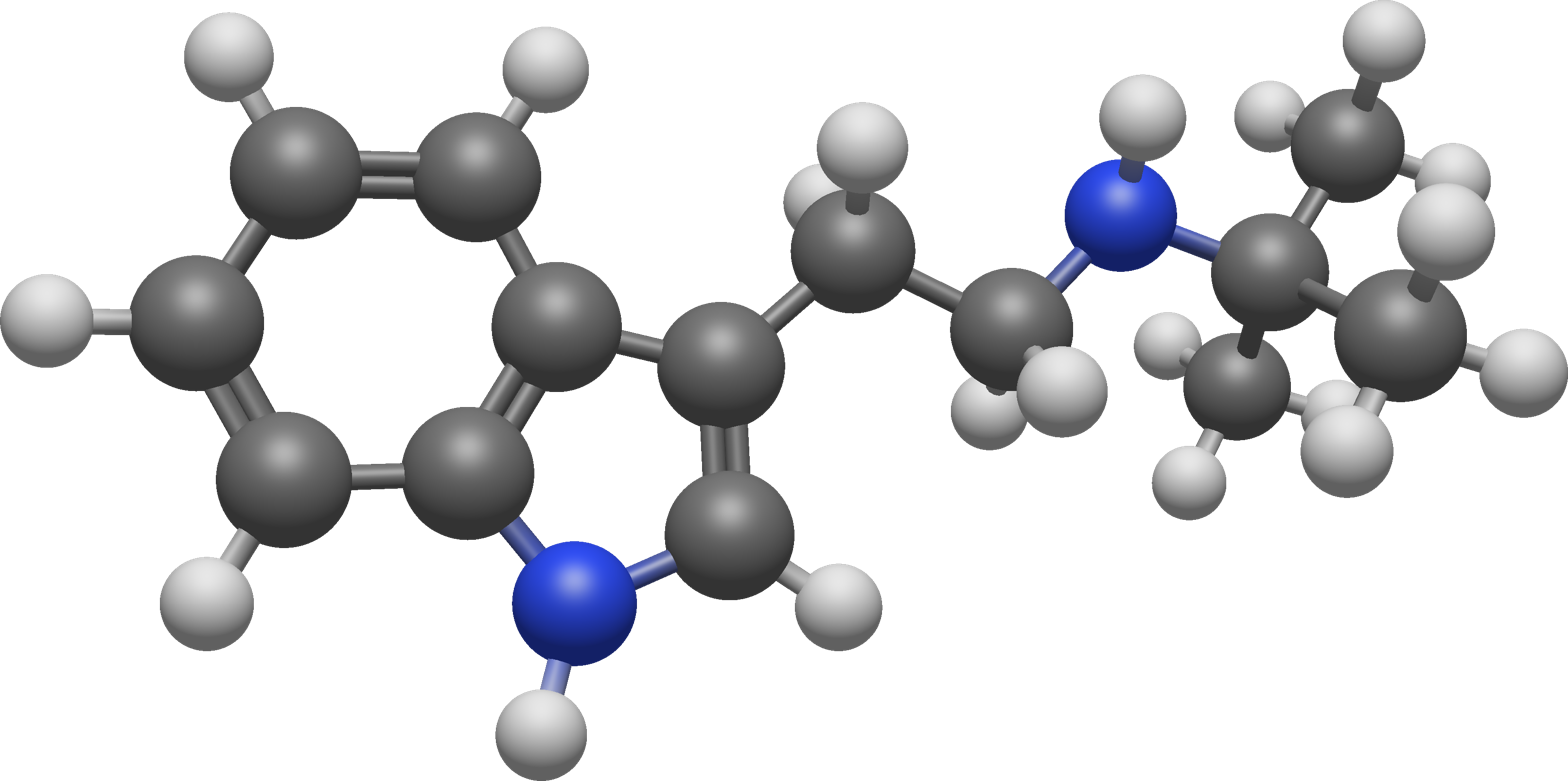

Clinical data
- Other names: N-t-Butyltryptamine; NtBT; NTBT
- Routes of administration: Oral
- Drug class: Psychoactive drug
- ATC code: None

Pharmacokinetic data
- Duration of action: Unknown

Identifiers
- IUPAC name: N-[2-(1H-indol-3-yl)ethyl]-2-methylpropan-2-amine
- CAS Number: 1344092-44-9
- PubChem CID: 58980321
- ChemSpider: 109444783

Chemical and physical data
- Formula: C_{14}H_{20}N_{2}
- Molar mass: 216.328 g·mol^{−1}
- 3D model (JSmol): Interactive image
- SMILES: CC(C)(C)NCCC1=CNC2=CC=CC=C21
- InChI: InChI=1S/C14H20N2/c1-14(2,3)16-9-8-11-10-15-13-7-5-4-6-12(11)13/h4-7,10,15-16H,8-9H2,1-3H3; Key:IDXHHISJIRGWJV-UHFFFAOYSA-N

N-tert-Butyltryptamine (NtBT) is a psychoactive drug of the tryptamine family related to psychedelics like dimethyltryptamine (DMT).

== Use and effects ==
NtBT was briefly described by Alexander Shulgin in his book TiHKAL (Tryptamines I Have Known and Loved). According to Shulgin, NtBT is active at a dose of 5 to 20 mg or of ~20 mg orally. He also said that he had heard that NtBT is extremely potent when smoked, but had not received any particulars or confirmed that. Its effects included a lightheaded intoxication described as a totally pleasant buzz, but nothing more profound than that.

Shulgin has said that along with N-sec-butyltryptamine (NsBT), it is one of only two N-mono-substituted tryptamines with known psychoactivity. He also said that N-mono-substituted tryptamines might be GHB-like intoxicants devoid of psychedelic effects. However, N-methyltryptamine (NMT) has been reported to produce psychedelic effects.

== Chemistry ==
Analogues of NtBT include N-methyltryptamine (NMT), N-ethyltryptamine (NET), N-isopropyltryptamine (NiPT), N-benzyltryptamine (NBnT), 4-HO-DsBT, and 4-HO-McPeT, among others.

== See also ==
- Substituted tryptamine
