= Α-Methyl-N-ethyltryptamine =

α-Methyl-N-ethyltryptamine

Clinical data
- Drug class: central nervous system stimulant

Identifiers
- IUPAC name: N-Ethyl-1-(1H-indol-3-yl)propan-2-amine
- CAS Number: 4864-85-1
- PubChem CID: 21344225

Chemical and physical data
- Formula: C_{13}H_{18}N_{2}
- Molar mass: 202.301 g·mol^{−1}
- 3D model (JSmol): Interactive image
- SMILES: CCNC(C)CC1=CNC2=CC=CC=C21
- InChI: InChI=1S/C13H18N2/c1-3-14-10(2)8-11-9-15-13-7-5-4-6-12(11)13/h4-7,9-10,14-15H,3,8H2,1-2H3; Key:GNZCCKAECLLZLK-UHFFFAOYSA-N

α-Methyl-N-ethyltryptamine, also known as α-methyl-ethyltryptamine, α-methyl-NET, and α-MET, is a central nervous system stimulant belonging to the family of substituted tryptamines; it is a derivative of N-ethyltryptamine in which the ethylamine group in the α-configuration is substituted by a methyl group, or it can be described as the N-ethyl derivative of α-methyltryptamine.

== Pharmacology ==
=== Pharmacodynamics ===
α-MET has been studied in animals; it is known that at a dose of 20 mg/kg, the animals’ spontaneous motor activity simply increases, whilst at a dose of 30 mg/kg this turns into pronounced stimulation; at the maximum dose of 30 mg/kg, the substance reduces ptosis by 60 per cent within 25 minutes.

== See also ==
- Etilamfetamine
