= 5-MeO-NsBT =

Clinical data
- Other names: 5-MeO-NSBT; 5-Methoxy-N-sec-butyltryptamine
- Routes of administration: Oral
- Drug class: Psychoactive drug
- ATC code: None

Pharmacokinetic data
- Onset of action: 20–30 minutes
- Duration of action: Unknown

Identifiers
- IUPAC name: N-[2-(5-methoxy-1H-indol-3-yl)ethyl]butan-2-amine
- PubChem CID: 168947062

Chemical and physical data
- Formula: C_{15}H_{22}N_{2}O
- Molar mass: 246.354 g·mol^{−1}
- 3D model (JSmol): Interactive image
- SMILES: CCC(C)NCCC1=CNC2=C1C=C(C=C2)OC
- InChI: InChI=1S/C15H22N2O/c1-4-11(2)16-8-7-12-10-17-15-6-5-13(18-3)9-14(12)15/h5-6,9-11,16-17H,4,7-8H2,1-3H3; Key:QDZIWVXUCSRUBR-UHFFFAOYSA-N

5-MeO-NsBT, also known as 5-methoxy-N-sec-butyltryptamine, is a psychoactive drug of the tryptamine and 5-methoxytryptamine families. It emerged as a novel designer drug online in December 2022. More specifically, its chemical synthesis and the claimed properties and effects of 5-MeO-NsBT were posted on a specialized psychoactive drug forum.

The dose of the drug is said to be 3 to 10 mg orally and its onset is said to be 20 to 30 minutes, whereas its duration was not specified. Its effects were reported to include mildly increased empathy and sociability, more fluid thinking, easy and pleasant writing, intoxication, confusion, and after-effects such as mild depression. In addition, possible anti-inflammatory and analgesic effects were reported. No psychedelic or hallucinogenic effects were described.

The drug has not otherwise been encountered, for instance sold online or in drug seizures, as of 2023. It is not a controlled substance in Canada as of 2025.

== See also ==
- Substituted tryptamine
- N-sec-Butyltryptamine (NsBT)
- 5-MeO-MsBT
- 5-MeO-DsBT
