= Propyltryptamine =

Propyltryptamine may refer to:

- N-Propyltryptamine
- α-Propyltryptamine

== See also ==
- Isopropyltryptamine
