= 5-MeO-NBnT =

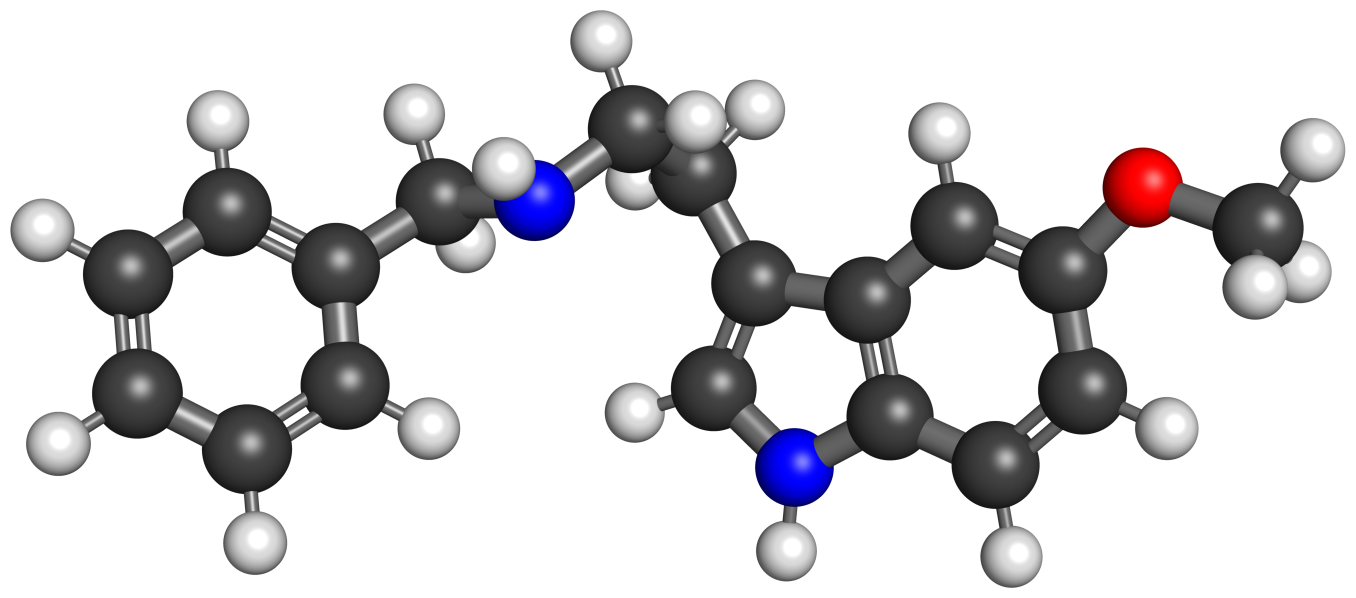

Clinical data
- Other names: 5-MeO-T-NB; N-Benzyl-5-methoxytryptamine; 3-(2'-Benzylaminoethyl)-5-methoxyindol
- Drug class: Non-selective serotonin receptor agonist; Serotonin 5-HT_{2A} receptor agonist
- ATC code: None

Identifiers
- IUPAC name: N-benzyl-2-(5-methoxy-1H-indol-3-yl)ethanamine
- CAS Number: 25100-31-6
- PubChem CID: 134909
- ChemSpider: 118888
- ChEMBL: ChEMBL58083
- CompTox Dashboard (EPA): DTXSID40179789

Chemical and physical data
- Formula: C_{18}H_{20}N_{2}O
- Molar mass: 280.371 g·mol^{−1}
- 3D model (JSmol): Interactive image
- SMILES: COC1=CC2=C(C=C1)NC=C2CCNCC3=CC=CC=C3
- InChI: InChI=1S/C18H20N2O/c1-21-16-7-8-18-17(11-16)15(13-20-18)9-10-19-12-14-5-3-2-4-6-14/h2-8,11,13,19-20H,9-10,12H2,1H3; Key:FQRAHCLOFRBKKA-UHFFFAOYSA-N

5-MeO-NBnT, also known as N-benzyl-5-methoxytryptamine or as 5-MeO-T-NB, is a serotonin receptor agonist of the tryptamine and 5-methoxytryptamine families related to 5-MeO-NMT.

== Pharmacology ==
=== Pharmacodynamics ===
5-MeO-NBnT binds to the serotonin 5-HT_{2A}, 5-HT_{2B}, and 5-HT_{2C} receptors (K_{i} = 5.3–55 nM, 16.6 nM, and 95.5–370 nM, respectively). It was assessed and found to be a potent partial agonist of the serotonin 5-HT_{2A} receptor (EC_{50} = 20.4–100 nM; E_{max} = 30–63%) and full agonist of the serotonin 5-HT_{2C} receptor (EC_{50} = 14.5 nM; E_{max} = 113%). The drug was not evaluated in terms of effects in animals.

== Chemistry ==
=== Synthesis ===
The chemical synthesis of 5-MeO-NBnT has been described.

=== Analogues ===
Analogues of 5-MeO-NBnT include N-benzyltryptamine (NBnT), 4-HO-NBnT, 5-MeO-NBOMeT, and 5-MeO-NB3OMeT, among others. It is also analogous to N-benzylphenethylamines, for instance 25-NB (NBOMe), 25B-NB (N-benzyl-2C-B), and 25I-NBOMe.

== History ==
5-MeO-NBnT was first described in the scientific literature by Keijiro Takagi and colleagues by 1969.

== See also ==
- Substituted tryptamine
