= 5-MeO-MsBT =

Clinical data
- Other names: 5-MeO-MSBT; 5-Methoxy-N-methyl-N-sec-butyltryptamine
- Routes of administration: Oral
- Drug class: Serotonergic psychedelic; Hallucinogen
- ATC code: None

Pharmacokinetic data
- Duration of action: 3–4 hours

Identifiers
- IUPAC name: N-[2-(5-methoxy-1H-indol-3-yl)ethyl]-N-methylbutan-2-amine
- PubChem CID: 168947049

Chemical and physical data
- Formula: C_{16}H_{24}N_{2}O
- Molar mass: 260.381 g·mol^{−1}
- 3D model (JSmol): Interactive image
- SMILES: CCC(C)N(C)CCC1=CNC2=C1C=C(C=C2)OC
- InChI: InChI=1S/C16H24N2O/c1-5-12(2)18(3)9-8-13-11-17-16-7-6-14(19-4)10-15(13)16/h6-7,10-12,17H,5,8-9H2,1-4H3; Key:VBRYRPHGPPNPMK-UHFFFAOYSA-N

5-MeO-MsBT, also known as 5-methoxy-N-methyl-N-sec-butyltryptamine, is a psychedelic drug of the tryptamine and 5-methoxytryptamine families. It emerged as a novel designer drug online in December 2022. More specifically, its chemical synthesis and the claimed properties and effects of 5-MeO-MsBT were posted on a specialized psychoactive drug forum.

The dose of the drug is said to be 10 to 30 mg orally and its duration is said to be 3 to 4 hours. Its effects were reported to include a tryptamine-like warmth or fuzzy feeling, tactile and music enhancement, enhanced mood, confusion, mild paranoia, weak psychedelic effects and self-detachment at higher doses, and an antidepressant-like psychedelic afterglow. The afterglow is said to last 12 to 24 hours, with apparent tolerance developing to it with repeated administration over a few days. 5-MeO-MsBT's effects were described as very similar to those of 5-MeO-MiPT at lower doses, but it is less potent than 5-MeO-MiPT and was regarded as inferior in many respects.

The drug has not otherwise been encountered, for instance sold online or in drug seizures, as of 2023. It is not a controlled substance in Canada as of 2025. The drug is not an explicitly controlled substance in the United States, but could be considered a controlled substance under the Federal Analogue Act if intended for human consumption.

== See also ==
- Substituted tryptamine
- 5-MeO-NsBT
- 5-MeO-DsBT
