= CPI-CG-8 =

Clinical data
- Other names: N-Methyl-N-(2-indolylethyl)tryptamine
- Drug class: Serotonin 5-HT_{2C} receptor agonist
- ATC code: None

Chemical and physical data
- Formula: C_{21}H_{23}N_{3}
- Molar mass: 317.436 g·mol^{−1}
- 3D model (JSmol): Interactive image
- SMILES: CN(CCC1=CNC2=CC=CC=C12)CCC3=CC(C=CC=C4)=C4N3
- InChI: InChI=1S/C21H23N3/c1-24(12-10-17-15-22-21-9-5-3-7-19(17)21)13-11-18-14-16-6-2-4-8-20(16)23-18/h2-9,14-15,22-23H,10-13H2,1H3; Key:PJYCXUOZLVUZNU-UHFFFAOYSA-N

CPI-CG-8, also known as N-methyl-N-(2-indolylethyl)tryptamine, is a "relatively" selective serotonin 5-HT_{2C} receptor agonist of the tryptamine family.

At the serotonin 5-HT_{2C} receptor, it showed 99.4% binding inhibition (a measure of affinity) at a concentration of 1,000 nM, had an activational potency (EC_{50}) of 12.46 nM, and showed an activational efficacy (E_{max}) of approximately 80%. The pharmacokinetics of CPI-CG-8 in rodents have been studied.

The drug was developed by Collaborations Pharmaceuticals and was derived via modification of the psychedelic drug psilocin using generative machine learning through a platform called MegaSyn. CPI-CG-8 was first described in the scientific literature by 2024. It is of interest for the potential treatment of opioid use disorder and other conditions.

== See also ==
- Substituted tryptamine
- Serotonin 5-HT_{2C} receptor agonist
- N-Benzyltryptamine
- NEtPhOH-THPI
