= Isamide =

Serotonin antagonist

Clinical data
- Other names: N-(1-Chloroacetyl)-5-methoxytryptamine
- Drug class: Serotonin receptor antagonist

Identifiers
- IUPAC name: 2-chloro-N-[2-(5-methoxy-1H-indol-3-yl)ethyl]acetamide
- CAS Number: 21424-91-9
- PubChem CID: 192991
- ChemSpider: 167480
- CompTox Dashboard (EPA): DTXSID10175697

Chemical and physical data
- Formula: C_{13}H_{15}ClN_{2}O_{2}
- Molar mass: 266.73 g·mol^{−1}
- 3D model (JSmol): Interactive image
- SMILES: COC1=CC2=C(C=C1)NC=C2CCNC(=O)CCl
- InChI: InChI=1S/C13H15ClN2O2/c1-18-10-2-3-12-11(6-10)9(8-16-12)4-5-15-13(17)7-14/h2-3,6,8,16H,4-5,7H2,1H3,(H,15,17); Key:UCLPNTKRPMTACI-UHFFFAOYSA-N

Isamide, also known as N-chloroacetyl-5-methoxytryptamine, is a serotonin receptor antagonist and the N-chloroacetyl derivative of 5-methoxytryptamine. It was first described in the scientific literature by 1969 and was first pharmacologically characterized by 1979.

== See also ==
- Substituted tryptamine
