= 5-MeO-DsBT =

Clinical data
- Other names: 5-MeO-DSBT; 5-Methoxy-N,N-di-sec-butyltryptamine
- ATC code: None

Identifiers
- IUPAC name: N-butan-2-yl-N-[2-(5-methoxy-1H-indol-3-yl)ethyl]butan-2-amine
- PubChem CID: 168007543

Chemical and physical data
- Formula: C_{19}H_{30}N_{2}O
- Molar mass: 302.462 g·mol^{−1}
- 3D model (JSmol): Interactive image
- SMILES: CCC(C)N(CCC1=CNC2=C1C=C(C=C2)OC)C(C)CC
- InChI: InChI=1S/C19H30N2O/c1-6-14(3)21(15(4)7-2)11-10-16-13-20-19-9-8-17(22-5)12-18(16)19/h8-9,12-15,20H,6-7,10-11H2,1-5H3; Key:KJOIPZZWWSZLRE-UHFFFAOYSA-N

5-MeO-DsBT, also known as 5-methoxy-N,N-di-sec-butyltryptamine, is a chemical compound and possible psychedelic drug of the tryptamine and 5-methoxytryptamine families related to 5-MeO-DMT. It was briefly mentioned by Alexander Shulgin in his 1997 book TiHKAL (Tryptamines I Have Known and Loved). He described it as being an unknown compound. Relatedly, its route, dose, and duration were not described. 5-MeO-DsBT was first described in the literature by Shulgin in TiHKAL in 1997. It is a skeletal isomer of 5-MeO-DBT. Subsequently, close analogues of 5-MeO-DsBT like 5-MeO-MsBT and 5-MeO-NsBT emerged as novel designer drugs in the early 2020s. 5-MeO-DsBT is not a controlled substance in Canada as of 2025.

== See also ==
- Substituted tryptamine
- DsBT and 4-HO-DsBT
