= NEtPhOH-3-THPI =

Clinical data
- Other names: N′-(2-Methoxyphenylethyl)-THPI; Compound 24c; 3-(1-(2-Methoxyphenylethyl)-1,2,3,6-tetrahydropyridin-5-yl)-1H-indole
- Drug class: Serotonin 5-HT_{2} receptor agonist; Serotonin 5-HT_{2A} receptor agonist; Serotonergic psychedelic; Hallucinogen
- ATC code: None

Identifiers
- IUPAC name: 2-{2-[5-(1H-indol-3-yl)-3,6-dihydropyridin-1(2H)-yl]ethyl}phenol

Chemical and physical data
- Formula: C_{21}H_{22}N_{2}O
- Molar mass: 318.420 g·mol^{−1}
- 3D model (JSmol): Interactive image
- SMILES: O([H])C1C=CC=CC=1CCN1CC(C2C3C(=CC=CC=3)N([H])C=2)=CCC1
- InChI: InChI=1S/C21H22N2O/c24-21-10-4-1-6-16(21)11-13-23-12-5-7-17(15-23)19-14-22-20-9-3-2-8-18(19)20/h1-4,6-10,14,22,24H,5,11-13,15H2; Key:FGMLLLJKETXMGK-UHFFFAOYSA-N

NEtPhOH-3-THPI, also known as N′-(2-methoxyphenylethyl)-3-THPI, is a serotonin 5-HT_{2} receptor agonist and possible serotonergic psychedelic of the tetrahydropyridinylindole (THPI) family related to psychedelic tryptamines. It is a cyclized tryptamine with an NBOMe-like substitution.

The drug is a potent and high-efficacy partial agonist of the serotonin 5-HT_{2A} receptor. Its affinity (K_{i}) for the receptor was 8.58 nM and its EC_{50} and E_{max} values were 20.7 nM (66.5%) for G_{q} signaling and 58.4 nM (80.7%) for β-arrestin2 signaling. NEtPhOH-3-THPI is also a potent near-full agonist of the serotonin 5-HT_{2B} receptor (EC_{50} = 7.94 nM; E_{max} = 88.9%) and a lower-potency full agonist of the serotonin 5-HT_{2C} receptor (EC_{50} = 263 nM; E_{max} = 105.1%). It is a weak serotonin reuptake inhibitor (IC_{50} = 1,288 nM) as well.

NEtPhOH-3-THPI induced the head-twitch response, a behavioral proxy of psychedelic effects, in rodents. It produced the head-twitch response at a dose of 3 mg/kg in mice but not at a dose of 1 mg/kg or 10 mg/kg. The drug produced about half the maximal number of head twitches as LSD. The preclinical pharmacokinetics of NEtPhOH-3-THPI via intraperitoneal injection have been studied.

NEtPhOH-3-THPI was first described in the scientific literature by Rongyan Li and colleagues by 2025. A close non-hallucinogenic pyrrolopyridine analogue with antidepressant-like effects in rodents was also reported. The chemical syntheses of both this compound and NEtPhOH-3-THPI were described.

== See also ==
- Tetrahydropyridinylindole
- Cyclized tryptamine
- List of miscellaneous 5-HT_{2A} receptor agonists
- RU-28253
- N-Benzyltryptamine (NBnT)
- 5-MeO-T-NBOMe
- (R)-70
- CPI-CG-8
