= 5-MeO-NET =

Chemical compound

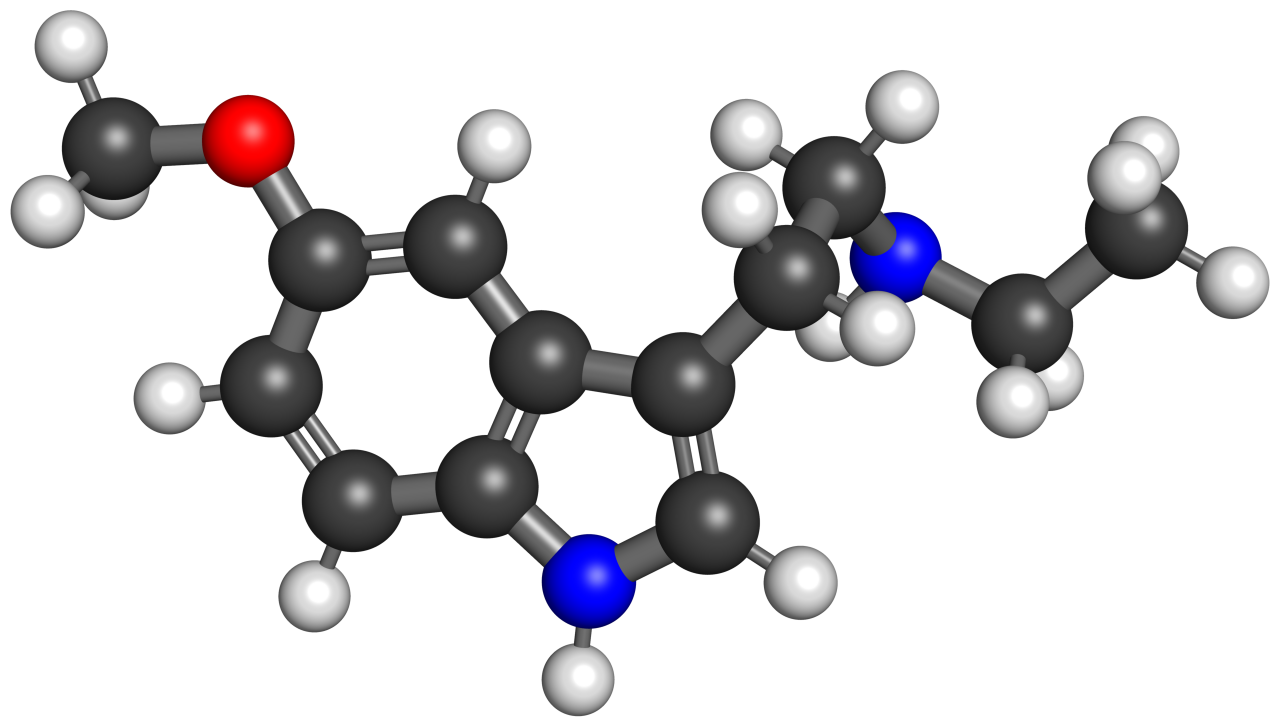

Clinical data
- Other names: 5-Methoxy-N-ethyltryptamine
- Drug class: Serotonin receptor agonist; Serotonin 5-HT_{2A} receptor agonist; Serotonin releasing agent
- ATC code: None

Identifiers
- IUPAC name: N-ethyl-2-(5-methoxy-1H-indol-3-yl)ethan-1-amine
- CAS Number: 1019-46-1
- PubChem CID: 23009084
- ChemSpider: 12955759
- ChEMBL: ChEMBL57888
- CompTox Dashboard (EPA): DTXSID801274222

Chemical and physical data
- Formula: C_{13}H_{18}N_{2}O
- Molar mass: 218.300 g·mol^{−1}
- 3D model (JSmol): Interactive image
- SMILES: CCNCCc1c[nH]c2c1cc(OC)cc2
- InChI: InChI=1S/C13H18N2O/c1-3-14-7-6-10-9-15-13-5-4-11(16-2)8-12(10)13/h4-5,8-9,14-15H,3,6-7H2,1-2H3; Key:UNPLGMNGAFLKSH-UHFFFAOYSA-N

5-MeO-NET, also known as 5-methoxy-N-ethyltryptamine, is a serotonin receptor agonist and serotonin releasing agent of the tryptamine family.

== Use and effects ==
5-MeO-NET was not included nor mentioned in Alexander Shulgin's book TiHKAL (Tryptamines I Have Known and Loved).

== Pharmacology ==
=== Pharmacodynamics ===
5-MeO-NET is a potent full agonist or near-full agonist of the serotonin 5-HT_{1A}, 5-HT_{2A}, 5-HT_{2B}, and 5-HT_{2C} receptors. The drug is a relatively weak serotonin releasing agent.

It does not produce the head-twitch response (HTR), a behavioral proxy of psychedelic effects, in rodents, suggesting that it would not be hallucinogenic in humans. However, 5-MeO-NET does produce the HTR if it is coadministered with a serotonin 5-HT_{1A} receptor antagonist like WAY-100635, suggesting that its serotonin 5-HT_{1A} receptor agonism masks or blocks its own serotonin 5-HT_{2A} receptor-mediated HTR induction.

== Chemistry ==
5-MeO-NET, chemically known as 5-methoxy-N-ethyltryptamine, is a synthetic substituted tryptamine and a N-Ethyltryptamine derivative.

=== Analogues ===
Analogues of 5-MeO-NET include N-Ethyltryptamine (NET), 4-HO-NET, 4-AcO-NET, αET, 4-HO-αET, 5-MeO-αET, 5-chloro-αMT (PAL-542), 5-fluoro-αET (PAL-545), 5-MeO-MET, 5-MeO-DMT, 5-MeO-DET, 5-MeO-MPT, 5-MeO-EPT, 5-MeO-MALT, and 5-MeO-MiPT, among others.

== History ==
5-MeO-NET was first described in the scientific literature by at least 1994. Research on 5-MeO-NET since the early 2000s has primarily focused on its interactions with serotonin receptors and other targets, as well as behavioral effects in rodent models.

== See also ==
- Substituted tryptamine
- 5-MeO-NMT
