= 5-MeO-NBpBrT =

Chemical compound

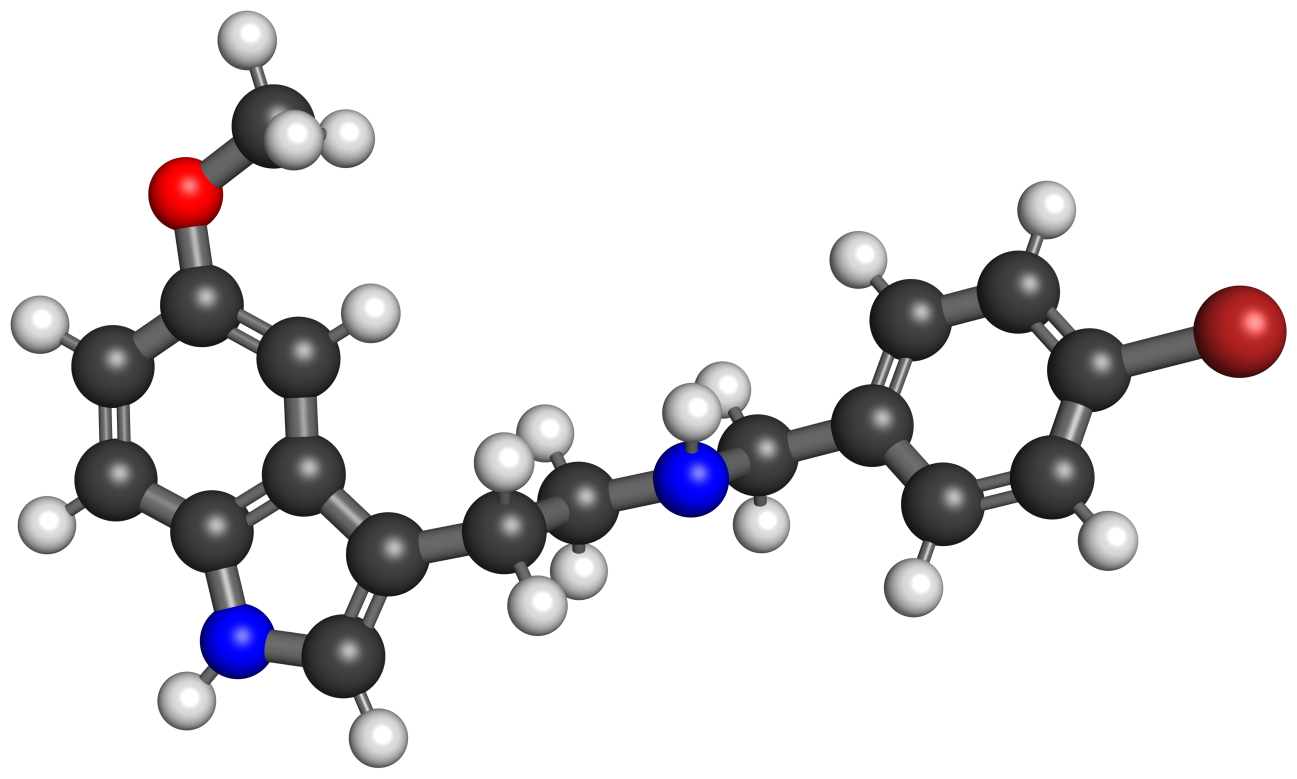

Clinical data
- Other names: 5-Methoxy-N-(4-bromobenzyl)tryptamine
- ATC code: None

Identifiers
- IUPAC name: N-(4-Bromobenzyl)-2-(5-methoxy-1H-indol-3-yl)ethanamine
- CAS Number: 155639-13-7
- PubChem CID: 5124753
- ChemSpider: 4299315
- UNII: UG43REN7BR
- ChEMBL: ChEMBL57427
- CompTox Dashboard (EPA): DTXSID901029953

Chemical and physical data
- Formula: C_{18}H_{19}BrN_{2}O
- Molar mass: 359.267 g·mol^{−1}
- 3D model (JSmol): Interactive image
- SMILES: BrC1=CC=C(CNCCC2=CNC3=CC=C(OC)C=C23)C=C1
- InChI: InChI=1S/C18H19BrN2O/c1-22-16-6-7-18-17(10-16)14(12-21-18)8-9-20-11-13-2-4-15(19)5-3-13/h2-7,10,12,20-21H,8-9,11H2,1H3; Key:XHLOUFPZLUULGI-UHFFFAOYSA-N

5-MeO-NBpBrT, also known as 5-methoxy-N-(4-bromobenzyl)tryptamine, is an N-substituted member of the 5-methoxytryptamine family of compounds. Like other such compounds, it acts as an antagonist for the serotonin 5-HT_{2A} receptor, with a claimed 100-fold selectivity over the closely related serotonin 5-HT_{2C} receptor. While N-benzyl substitution of psychedelic phenethylamines often results in potent serotonin 5-HT_{2A} agonists, it had been thought that N-benzyltryptamines show much lower efficacy and are either very weak partial agonists or antagonists at the serotonin 5-HT_{2A} receptor, though more recent research has shown stronger agonist activity for 3-substituted benzyl derivatives. Extending the benzyl group to a substituted phenethyl can also recover agonist activity in certain cases.

== See also ==
- Substituted tryptamine
- 25B-NBOMe
- 25I-NBF
- 5-MeO-T-NBOMe
- 5-MeO-T-NB3OMe
- RH-34
