= 5-MeO-T-NBOMe =

Chemical compound

Clinical data
- Other names: 5MT-NBOMe; NBOMe-5-MeO-T; 5-MeO-NBOMeT; N-(2-Methoxybenzyl)-5-methoxytryptamine
- Drug class: Serotonin 5-HT_{2} receptor agonist; Serotonergic psychedelic; Hallucinogen
- ATC code: None

Identifiers
- IUPAC name: 2-(5-methoxy-1H-indol-3-yl)-N-[(2-methoxyphenyl)methyl]ethanamine
- CAS Number: 1335331-37-7
- PubChem CID: 122363719
- ChemSpider: 26599679

Chemical and physical data
- Formula: C_{19}H_{22}N_{2}O_{2}
- Molar mass: 310.397 g·mol^{−1}
- 3D model (JSmol): Interactive image
- SMILES: COC1=CC2=C(C=C1)NC=C2CCNCC3=CC=CC=C3OC
- InChI: InChI=1S/C19H22N2O2/c1-22-16-7-8-18-17(11-16)14(13-21-18)9-10-20-12-15-5-3-4-6-19(15)23-2/h3-8,11,13,20-21H,9-10,12H2,1-2H3; Key:OROYLKZKNDLGIQ-UHFFFAOYSA-N

5-MeO-T-NBOMe, also known as 5MT-NBOMe or NBOMe-5-MeO-T, is a psychedelic drug of the tryptamine family related to the 25-NB (NBOMe) drugs. It has been sold online as a designer drug.

== Use and effects ==
5-MeO-T-NBOMe is said to produce hallucinogenic effects in humans.

== Pharmacology ==
=== Pharmacodynamics ===
5-MeO-T-NBOMe is a serotonin 5-HT_{2} receptor agonist and produces the head-twitch response in rodents. However, compared to 25I-NBOMe, the drug is much less potent in producing the head-twitch response (~10-fold) and produces a much weaker maximal response (~25%). 5-MeO-T-NBOMe is many times less potent than comparable phenethylamines such as 25C-NBOMe, but is still a reasonably potent and effective partial agonist for the 5-HT_{2} family of serotonin receptors. A number of related compounds have also been developed, and in contrast to the phenethylamine counterparts the meta-substituted benzyl derivatives are in many cases more potent than the ortho-substituted benzyl compounds.

== Chemistry ==
=== Analogues ===
Analogues of 5-MeO-T-NBOMe include 5-methoxytryptamine (5-MT), N-benzyltryptamine (NBnT), 4-HO-NBnT, 5-MeO-NBnT, T-NBOMe, 5-MeO-T-NB3OMe, 5-MeO-NBpBrT, 5-MeO-N-DEAOP-NMT, and NEtPhOH-THPI, among others. It also shares structural similarities with pertines like oxypertine.

== History ==
5-MeO-T-NBOMe was described by David E. Nichols and colleagues in 2015. It was encountered online as a novel designer drug in 2023.

== Society and culture ==
=== Legal status ===
==== Canada ====
5-MeO-T-NBOMe is not a controlled substance in Canada as of 2025.

==== United States ====
5-MeO-T-NBOMe is not an explicitly controlled substance in the United States. However, it could be considered a controlled substance under the Federal Analogue Act if intended for human consumption.

== See also ==
- Substituted tryptamine
