= 5-MeO-T-NB3OMe =

Clinical data
- Other names: 5MT-NB3OMe; NB3MeO-5-MeO-T; 5-MeO-T-NB3MeO; 5-MeO-NB3OMeT; N-(3-Methoxybenzyl)-5-methoxytryptamine
- Drug class: Serotonin receptor modulator; Serotonin 5-HT_{2A} receptor agonist; Serotonergic psychedelic; Hallucinogen
- ATC code: None

Identifiers
- IUPAC name: 2-(5-methoxy-1H-indol-3-yl)-N-[(3-methoxyphenyl)methyl]ethanamine
- CAS Number: 1648553-42-7
- PubChem CID: 172915172
- ChemSpider: 128484569

Chemical and physical data
- Formula: C_{19}H_{22}N_{2}O_{2}
- Molar mass: 310.397 g·mol^{−1}
- 3D model (JSmol): Interactive image
- SMILES: COC1=CC2=C(C=C1)NC=C2CCNCC3=CC(=CC=C3)OC
- InChI: InChI=1S/C19H22N2O2/c1-22-16-5-3-4-14(10-16)12-20-9-8-15-13-21-19-7-6-17(23-2)11-18(15)19/h3-7,10-11,13,20-21H,8-9,12H2,1-2H3; Key:CJLDIVRTIQMENX-UHFFFAOYSA-N

5-MeO-T-NB3OMe, or 5MT-NB3OMe, also known as N-(3-methoxybenzyl)-5-methoxytryptamine, is a serotonin receptor modulator and psychedelic drug of the tryptamine, 5-methoxytryptamine, and N-benzyltryptamine families related to the 25-NB (NBOMe) psychedelics. It is a positional isomer of 5-MeO-T-NBOMe (5-MeO-T-NB2OMe).

The drug shows affinity for many serotonin receptors and acts as an agonist of the serotonin 5-HT_{2A}, 5-HT_{2B}, and 5-HT_{2C} receptors. It had similar affinity and activational potency at the human serotonin 5-HT_{2A} receptor as 5-MeO-T-NBOMe. In addition, the drug had around 10-fold lower affinity for the human serotonin 5-HT_{2A} receptor as 25I-NBOMe (25I-NB2OMe) but showed similar activational potency at this receptor as 25I-NBOMe. 5-MeO-T-NB3OMe produces the head-twitch response, a behavioral proxy of psychedelic effects, in rodents. It had similar potency in this test as 5-MeO-T-NBOMe and 25I-NB3OMe, but showed dramatically or 42- to 45-fold lower potency than 25I-NBOMe.

The chemical synthesis of 5-MeO-T-NB3OMe has been described. Various analogues of 5-MeO-T-NB3OMe besides 5-MeO-T-NBOMe have also been described.

5-MeO-T-NB3OMe was first described in the scientific literature by David E. Nichols and colleagues in 2015. It is not a controlled substance in Canada as of 2025. It is also not an explicitly controlled substance in the United States, but it could be considered a controlled substance under the Federal Analogue Act if intended for human consumption.

== See also ==
- Substituted tryptamine
- 5-MeO-T-NBOMe
- N-Benzyltryptamine
- 5-MeO-NBnT (5-MeO-T-NB)
- 5-MeO-NBpBrT
- 25-NB (psychedelics)
