= N-Benzyltryptamine =

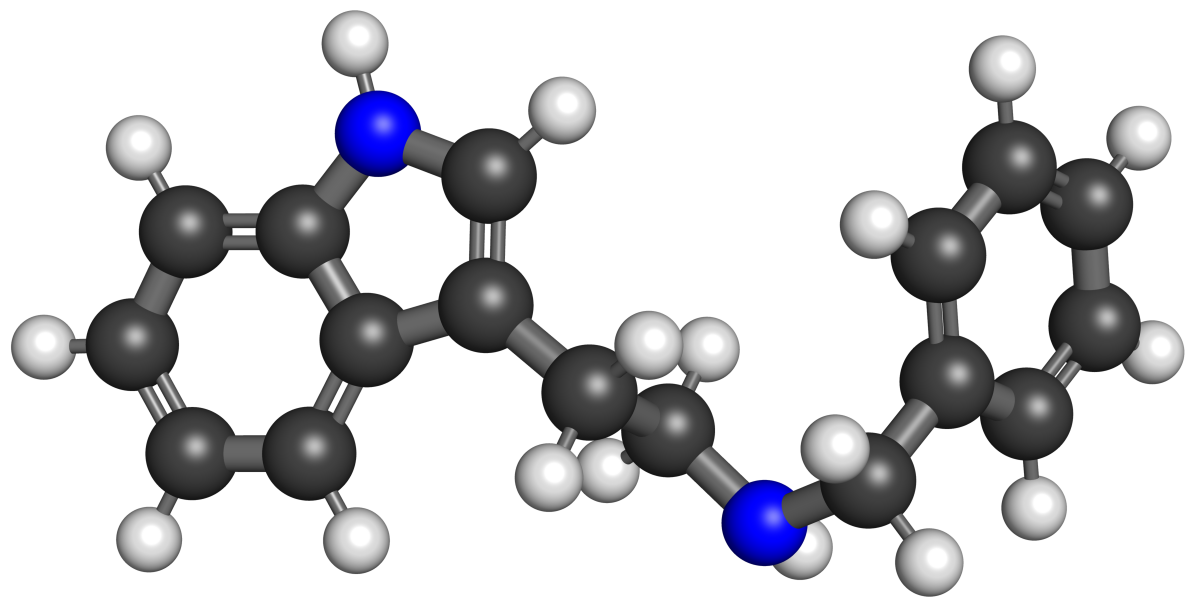

Clinical data
- Other names: T-NB; NB-T; NBnT
- Drug class: Serotonin receptor modulator; Serotonin 5-HT_{2} receptor agonist
- ATC code: None

Identifiers
- IUPAC name: N-benzyl-2-(1H-indol-3-yl)ethanamine
- CAS Number: 15741-79-4
- PubChem CID: 45592
- ChemSpider: 41482
- UNII: ZX482LU2G7
- ChEMBL: ChEMBL1423367
- CompTox Dashboard (EPA): DTXSID00166256
- ECHA InfoCard: 100.036.196

Chemical and physical data
- Formula: C_{17}H_{18}N_{2}
- Molar mass: 250.345 g·mol^{−1}
- 3D model (JSmol): Interactive image
- SMILES: C1=CC=C(C=C1)CNCCC2=CNC3=CC=CC=C32
- InChI: InChI=1S/C17H18N2/c1-2-6-14(7-3-1)12-18-11-10-15-13-19-17-9-5-4-8-16(15)17/h1-9,13,18-19H,10-12H2; Key:PRRZWJAGZHENJJ-UHFFFAOYSA-N

N-Benzyltryptamine, also known as T-NB, NB-T, or NBnT, is a serotonin receptor modulator of the tryptamine family. It is the N-benzyl derivative of tryptamine.

== Use and effects ==
N-Benzyltryptamine is not known to have been tested in humans, and it is unknown whether it may produce hallucinogenic effects in humans.

== Pharmacology ==
=== Pharmacodynamics ===
N-Benzyltryptamine shows affinity for the serotonin 5-HT_{2} receptors. Its affinities (K_{i}) were 245 nM for the serotonin 5-HT_{2A} receptor, 100 nM for the serotonin 5-HT_{2B} receptor, and 186 nM for the serotonin 5-HT_{2C} receptor. In terms of activational activities, specifically calcium mobilization, N-benzyltryptamine's EC_{50} (E_{max}) values were 162 nM (62%) at the serotonin 5-HT_{2A} receptor and 50 nM (121%) at the serotonin 5-HT_{2C} receptor. At the serotonin 5-HT_{2A} receptor, it had higher affinity than tryptamine, but lower activational potency in comparison. In other studies, at the rat serotonin 5-HT_{2A} receptor, N-benzyltryptamine's EC_{50} was 407 nM and its E_{max} was 26%.

The drug has been reported to produce serotonergic psychedelic-like effects in early studies in animals. This included hyperthermia and behavioral changes in the open field test.

== Chemistry ==
=== Analogues ===
Analogues of NbNT include 4-HO-NBnT, 5-MeO-NBnT, T-NBOMe, 5-MeO-T-NBOMe, 5-MeO-T-NB3OMe, CPI-CG-8, and NEtPhOH-THPI, among others. It is also analogous to N-benzylphenethylamines, for instance 25B-NB (N-benzyl-2C-B), 25I-NBOMe, and benzphetamine (N-benzylmethamphetamine).

== History ==
N-Benzyltryptamine was first described in the scientific literature by Roger W. Brimblecombe and colleagues by at least 1964. Derivatives of N-benzyltryptamine, such as 5-MeO-T-NBOMe, have subsequently been described as well.

== See also ==
- Substituted tryptamine
