= 4-HO-NET =

Clinical data
- Other names: 4-Hydroxy-N-ethyltryptamine
- Drug class: Serotonin receptor modulator; Serotonin 5-HT_{2A} receptor agonist; Serotonergic psychedelic; Hallucinogen
- ATC code: None

Identifiers
- IUPAC name: 3-[2-(ethylamino)ethyl]-1H-indol-4-ol
- PubChem CID: 121008224
- ChemSpider: 63001243

Chemical and physical data
- Formula: C_{12}H_{16}N_{2}O
- Molar mass: 204.273 g·mol^{−1}
- 3D model (JSmol): Interactive image
- SMILES: CCNCCC1=CNC2=C1C(=CC=C2)O
- InChI: InChI=1S/C12H16N2O/c1-2-13-7-6-9-8-14-10-4-3-5-11(15)12(9)10/h3-5,8,13-15H,2,6-7H2,1H3; Key:AGYHPYWJOGSFII-UHFFFAOYSA-N

4-HO-NET, also known as 4-hydroxy-N-ethyltryptamine, is a serotonin receptor modulator and putative psychedelic drug of the tryptamine and 4-hydroxytryptamine families related to norpsilocin (4-HO-NMT). It was not included by Alexander Shulgin in his 1997 book TiHKAL (Tryptamines I Have Known and Loved) and its properties and effects in humans are unknown. The drug acts as a non-selective serotonin receptor agonist, including of the serotonin 5-HT_{2A} receptor. It produces the head-twitch response, a behavioral proxy of psychedelic effects, in rodents, albeit with about 13-fold lower potency than psilocin (4-HO-DMT). Unlike 4-HO-NET, norpsilocin is notably inactive in this test. In addition to its psychedelic-like effects, 4-HO-NET produces hypolocomotion and hypothermia in rodents. 4-HO-NET was first described in the scientific literature by Alexander Sherwood and colleagues by 2024.

== See also ==
- Substituted tryptamine
- 4-HO-DET (ethocin)
