= N-Methyltryptamine =

Chemical compound

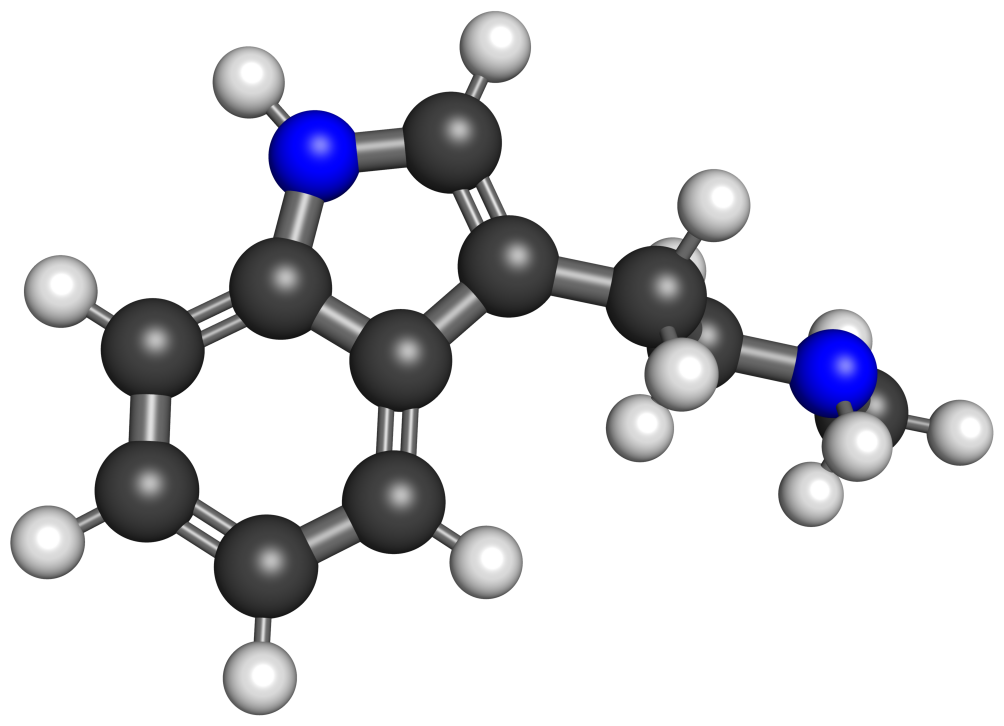

Clinical data
- Other names: NMT; Methyltryptamine; N-MT; Monomethyltryptamine; Dipterine; PAL-152; PAL152
- Routes of administration: Smoking, oral (with an MAOI)
- Drug class: Non-selective serotonin receptor agonist; Serotonin 5-HT_{2A} receptor agonist; Serotonin-releasing agent; Serotonergic psychedelic; Hallucinogen

Legal status
- Legal status: US: Schedule I (isomer of AMT)

Pharmacokinetic data
- Duration of action: Seconds to minutes

Identifiers
- IUPAC name: 2-(1H-indol-3-yl)-N-methylethan-1-amine
- CAS Number: 61-49-4
- PubChem CID: 6088
- ChemSpider: 5863
- UNII: 6FRL4L3Z7V
- KEGG: C06213
- ChEBI: CHEBI:28136
- ChEMBL: ChEMBL348588
- CompTox Dashboard (EPA): DTXSID70209846
- ECHA InfoCard: 100.000.462

Chemical and physical data
- Formula: C_{11}H_{14}N_{2}
- Molar mass: 174.247 g·mol^{−1}
- 3D model (JSmol): Interactive image
- Melting point: 87 to 89 °C (189 to 192 °F)
- SMILES: CNCCc1c[nH]c2ccccc12
- InChI: InChI=1S/C11H14N2/c1-12-7-6-9-8-13-11-5-3-2-4-10(9)11/h2-5,8,12-13H,6-7H2,1H3; Key:NCIKQJBVUNUXLW-UHFFFAOYSA-N

N-Methyltryptamine (NMT), also known as monomethyltryptamine, is a chemical compound of the tryptamine family and a naturally occurring compound found in various plants and animals, including humans.

It is biosynthesized in humans from tryptamine by certain N-methyltransferase enzymes, such as indolethylamine N-methyltransferase. It is a known component of human urine. NMT is an alkaloid derived from L-tryptophan that has been found in the bark, shoots and leaves of several plant genera, including Virola, Acacia, Mimosa, and Desmanthus—often together with the related compounds N,N-dimethyltryptamine (DMT) and 5-methoxy-N,N-dimethyltryptamine (5-MeO-DMT).

NMT acts as a serotonin receptor agonist and serotonin releasing agent and is said to produce hallucinogenic effects in humans.

== Use and effects ==
Orally administered NMT appears to produce no psychoactive effects, likely as a result of extensive first-pass metabolism.

According to Roger W. Brimblecombe and colleagues, NMT is inactive in humans, with few details provided. On the other hand, according to reports given to Alexander Shulgin and by others, NMT is active via non-oral routes. It has been said to produce psychedelic effects at doses of 50 to 120 mg by smoking or vaporization, with a duration of seconds to minutes. Based on preliminary reports, NMT is reported to produce visuals, but its effects are described as primarily spatial in nature, among other effects.

NMT has also been reported to be orally active in combination with a monoamine oxidase inhibitor (MAOI).

== Pharmacology ==
=== Pharmacodynamics ===
NMT activities
Target	Affinity (K_{i}, nM)
5-HT_{1A}	IA
5-HT_{2A}	51 (EC_{50}); 96% (E_{max})
SERT	22^{a} (EC_{50})
NET	733^{a} (EC_{50})
DAT	321^{a} (EC_{50})
Notes: The smaller the value, the more avidly the drug interacts with the site. Footnotes: ^{a} = Neurotransmitter release. Sources:

NMT is known to act as a potent serotonin 5-HT_{2A} receptor full agonist. It has been reported to be inactive in activating the β-arrestin2 pathway of the receptor and hence appears to be a biased agonist of the serotonin 5-HT_{2A} receptor. The drug does not seem to be an agonist of the serotonin 5-HT_{1A} receptor. On the other hand, it is also a serotonin receptor agonist in the rat uterus and stomach strip.

In addition to its serotonin 5-HT_{2A} receptor agonism, NMT is a potent serotonin releasing agent. It also releases dopamine and norepinephrine, though much more weakly (14- and 33-fold less than for serotonin, respectively).

NMT has also been evaluated for binding affinity at the sigma σ_{1} and sigma σ_{2} receptors. It's affinity towards both sigma receptors is intermediate between the unmethylated tryptamine and the fully dimethylated DMT.

=== Pharmacokinetics ===
NMT undergoes oxidative deamination by monoamine oxidase (MAO), particularly MAO-A, which preferentially metabolizes serotonin and tryptamine derivatives. The intermediate methylation state of NMT makes it a substrate for further N-methylation to DMT by amine N-methyltransferase (INMT).

== Chemistry ==
=== Synthesis ===
The chemical synthesis of NMT has been described.

=== Analogues ===
Analogues of NMT include N-ethyltryptamine (NET), methylethyltryptamine (MET), and dimethyltryptamine (DMT), among others.

== Natural occurrence ==
NMT is naturally occurring in Acacia species like Acacia confusa (1.63%; Buchanan et al., 2007), Acacia obtusifolia (up to two-thirds of total alkaloid content), and Acacia simplicifolia (A. simplex; 1.44% in bark, 0.29% twigs; Pouet et al., 1976) and Desmanthus illinoensis (major component seasonally).

== History ==
NMT was encountered as a novel designer drug by 2014.

== Society and culture ==
=== Legal status ===
==== Canada ====
NMT is not a controlled substance in Canada.

==== United States ====
In the United States, NMT is considered a schedule 1 controlled substance as an positional isomer of α-methyltryptamine (AMT).

== See also ==
- Substituted tryptamine
- List of investigational hallucinogens and entactogens
