= N-Ethyltryptamine =

Chemical compound

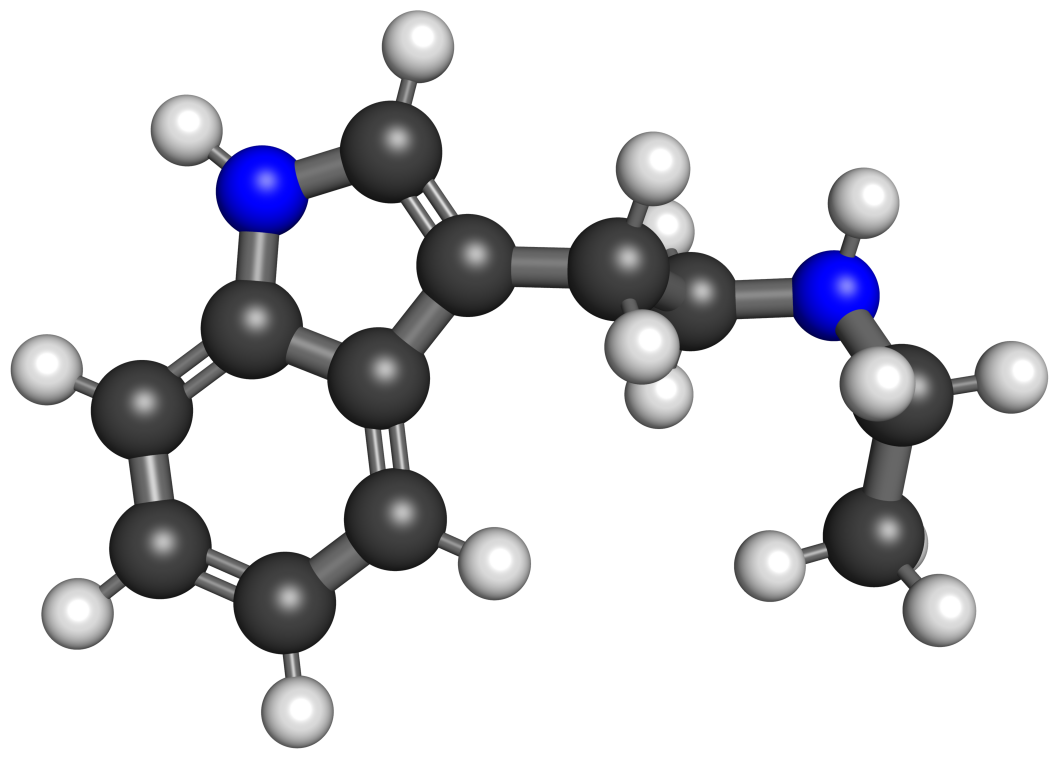

Clinical data
- Other names: NET; NETP; Ethyltryptamine
- ATC code: None

Legal status
- Legal status: US: Schedule I (isomer of DMT)

Identifiers
- IUPAC name: N-ethyl-2-(1H-indol-3-yl)ethan-1-amine
- CAS Number: 61-53-0
- PubChem CID: 6092
- ChemSpider: 5867
- UNII: M6X6KY3BQH
- CompTox Dashboard (EPA): DTXSID90209848

Chemical and physical data
- Formula: C_{12}H_{16}N_{2}
- Molar mass: 188.274 g·mol^{−1}
- 3D model (JSmol): Interactive image
- Melting point: 87 to 88 °C (189 to 190 °F)
- SMILES: CCNCCc1c[nH]c2ccccc12
- InChI: InChI=1S/C12H16N2/c1-2-13-8-7-10-9-14-12-6-4-3-5-11(10)12/h3-6,9,13-14H,2,7-8H2,1H3; Key:TZWUSTVNAVKAPA-UHFFFAOYSA-N

N-Ethyltryptamine (NET), also abbreviated as NETP, is a tryptamine that is structurally related to N-methyltryptamine (NMT) and the psychedelic drugs N,N-dimethyltryptamine (DMT) and N,N-diethyltryptamine (DET).

== Use and effects ==
Alexander Shulgin included NET as an entry in his book TiHKAL (Tryptamines I Have Known and Loved). However, he stated that it had been subjected only to modest human trials and that no active dose level had been identified.

== Pharmacology ==
=== Pharmacodynamics ===
NMT activities
Target	Affinity (K_{i}, nM)
5-HT_{1A}	IA
5-HT_{2A}	38 (EC_{50}); 99% (E_{max})
SERT	19^{a} (EC_{50})
NET	3,862^{a} (EC_{50})
DAT	6,660^{a} (EC_{50})
Notes: The smaller the value, the more avidly the drug interacts with the site. Footnotes: ^{a} = Neurotransmitter release. Sources:

NET has been found to act as a potent serotonin 5-HT_{2A} receptor full agonist and a selective serotonin releasing agent. It is inactive at the 5-HT_{1A} receptor. The drug is also a serotonin receptor agonist in the rat uterus and stomach strip.

== Chemistry ==
=== Synthesis ===
The chemical synthesis of NET has been described.

=== Analogues ===
Analogues of NET include N-methyltryptamine (NMT), dimethyltryptamine (DMT), methylethyltryptamine (MET), and diethyltryptamine (DET), among others.

== Society and culture ==
=== Legal status ===
==== Canada ====
NET is not a controlled substance in Canada as of 2025.

== See also ==
- Substituted tryptamine
