= Norpsilocin =

Chemical compound

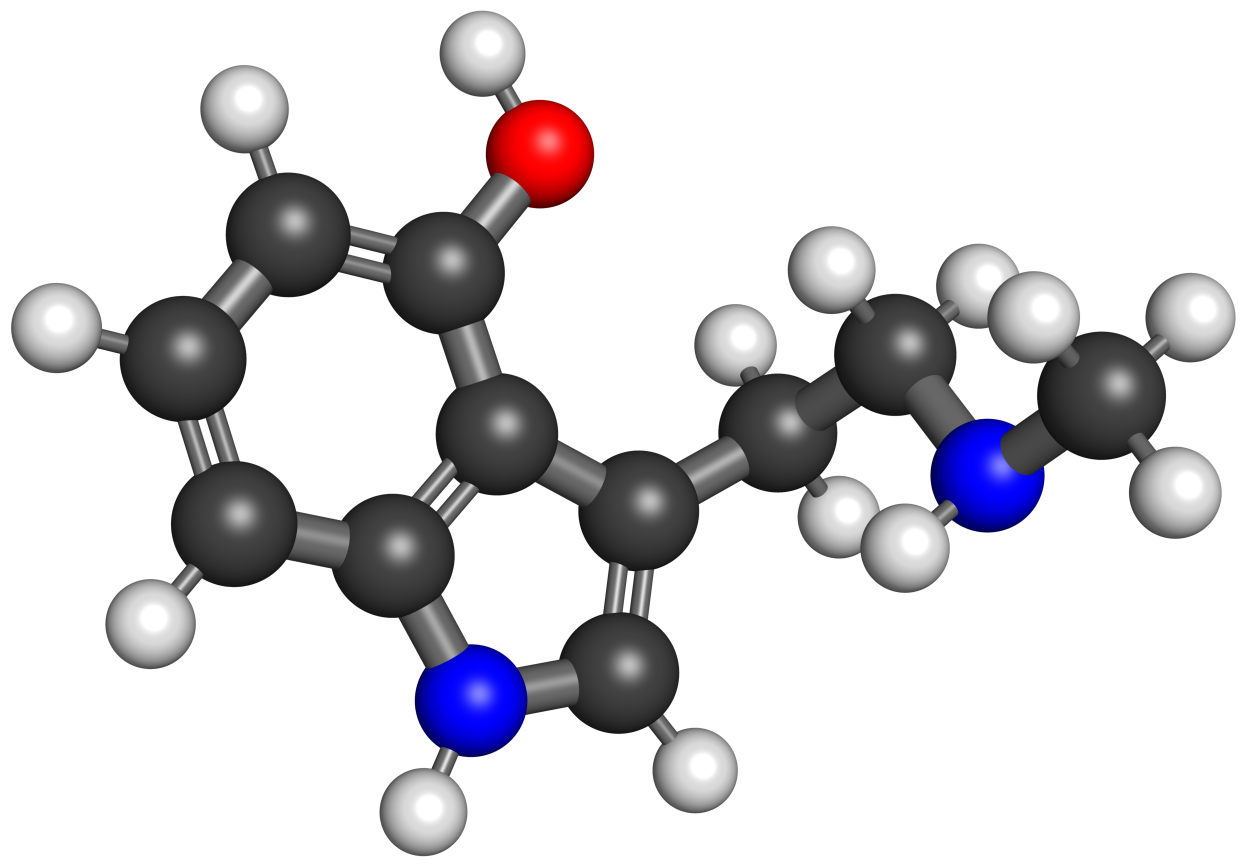

Clinical data
- Other names: 4-HO-NMT; 4-OH-NMT; 4-HO-MMT; 4-OH-MMT; 4-Hydroxy-NMT; 4-Hydroxy-MMT; 4-Hydroxy-N-methyltryptamine; 4-Hydroxy-mono-methyltryptamine; N-Desmethylpsilocin; Desmethylpsilocin; AS-63499; PLZ-1017; PLZ1017
- Drug class: Serotonin receptor modulator; Non-hallucinogenic Serotonin 5-HT_{2A} receptor agonist
- ATC code: None

Identifiers
- IUPAC name: 3-[2-(methylamino)ethyl]-1H-indol-4-ol
- CAS Number: 28363-70-4
- PubChem CID: 14107683
- ChemSpider: 27283888
- UNII: TL6QDJ5TMQ
- ChEMBL: ChEMBL4648350
- CompTox Dashboard (EPA): DTXSID901336988

Chemical and physical data
- Formula: C_{11}H_{14}N_{2}O
- Molar mass: 190.246 g·mol^{−1}
- 3D model (JSmol): Interactive image
- SMILES: CNCCC1=CNC2=C1C(=CC=C2)O
- InChI: InChI=1S/C11H14N2O/c1-12-6-5-8-7-13-9-3-2-4-10(14)11(8)9/h2-4,7,12-14H,5-6H2,1H3; Key:MTJOWJUQGYWRHT-UHFFFAOYSA-N

Norpsilocin, also known as 4-hydroxy-N-methyltryptamine (4-HO-NMT), is a tryptamine alkaloid recently discovered in 2017 in the psychedelic mushroom Psilocybe cubensis. It is hypothesized to be a dephosphorylated metabolite of baeocystin.

== Pharmacology ==
Norpsilocin was found to be a near full agonist of the 5-HT_{2A} receptor and was found to be more potent than psilocin. It also has affinity for other serotonin receptors. Moreover, it has been found to cross the blood–brain barrier in animals and to have good metabolic stability similarly to psilocin.

Norpsilocin has shown psilocin-related peripheral effects in animals, including decreased spinal reflexes such as knee jerk response (opposite effect to psilocin), antiserotonergic activity (14% of that of psilocin), and pressor activity (70% of that of psilocin). Surprisingly however, in spite of its serotonin 5-HT_{2A} receptor agonism and psilocin-like effects, norpsilocin failed to induce the head-twitch response, a behavioral proxy of psychedelic effects, in animals. Likewise, norbaeocystin and aeruginascin failed to induce the head-twitch response. Only psilocybin was effective in this regard. In any case, norbaeocystin showed antidepressant-like activity (forced swim test) similarly to psilocybin and fluoxetine in spite of its putative non-hallucinogenic nature. Norpsilocin itself was not tested in this assay.

A 2025 animal study found that both baeocystin and norpsilocin are peripherally selective with very limited ability to cross the blood–brain barrier.

== Chemistry ==
=== Analogues ===
==== 4-AcO-NMT ====
4-AcO-NMT, the acetate ester of NMT, has been described.

== Research ==
Norpsilocin is being evaluated under the developmental code name PLZ-1017 for the possible treatment of pervasive developmental disorders in children.

== See also ==
- Substituted tryptamine
- List of investigational hallucinogens and entactogens
- 4-Hydroxytryptamine
