= 4-HO-PiPT =

Chemical compound

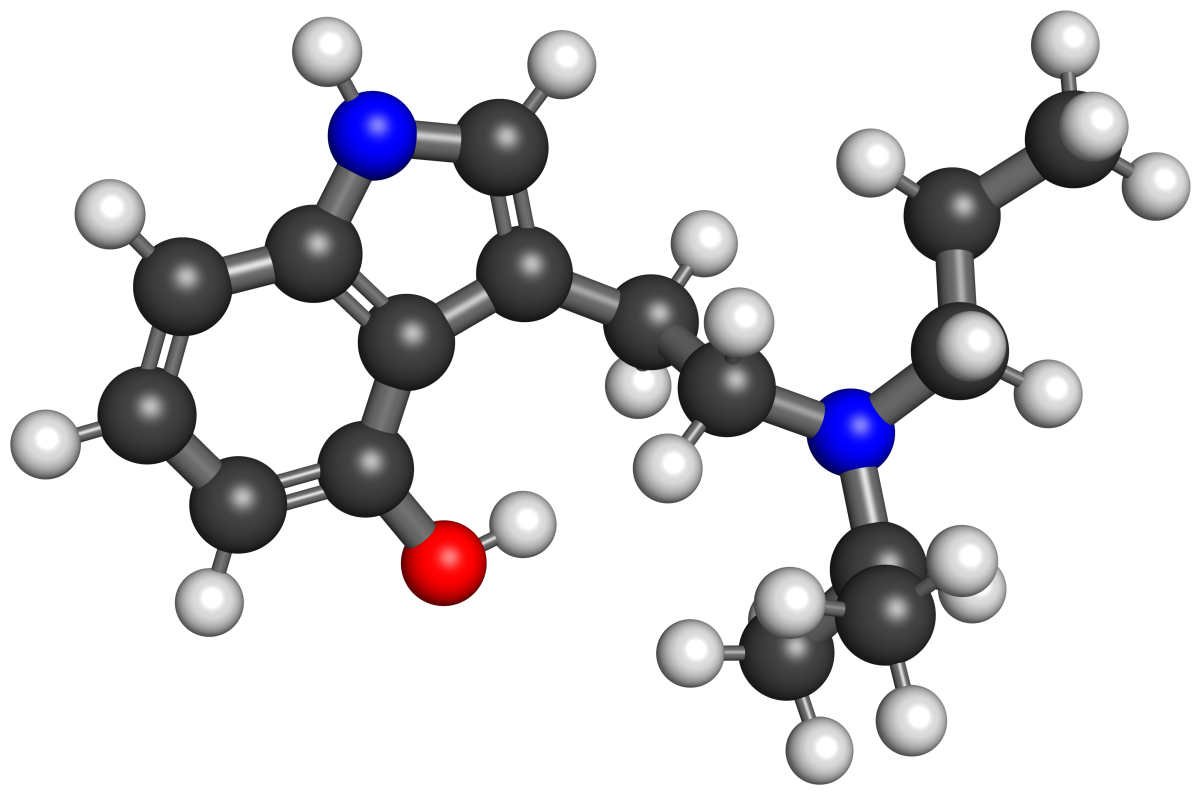

Clinical data
- Other names: 4-Hydroxy-N-propyl-N-isopropyltryptamine; Piprocin
- Routes of administration: Oral
- Drug class: Non-selective serotonin receptor agonist; Serotonin 5-HT_{2A} receptor agonist; Serotonergic psychedelic; Hallucinogen

Identifiers
- IUPAC name: 3-{2-[(propan-2-yl)(propyl)amino]ethyl}-1H-indol-4-ol
- CAS Number: 2767428-88-4
- PubChem CID: 166468747

Chemical and physical data
- Formula: C_{16}H_{24}N_{2}O
- Molar mass: 260.381 g·mol^{−1}
- 3D model (JSmol): Interactive image
- SMILES: CC(C)N(CCC)CCc1c[NH]c2cccc(O)c21
- InChI: InChI=1S/C16H24N2O/c1-4-9-18(12(2)3)10-8-13-11-17-14-6-5-7-15(19)16(13)14/h5-7,11-12,17,19H,4,8-10H2,1-3H3; Key:CUTUPKOZXNFVHK-UHFFFAOYSA-N

4-HO-PiPT, also known as 4-hydroxy-N-propyl-N-isopropyltryptamine or as piprocin, is a substituted tryptamine derivative which is claimed to have psychedelic effects. It has been encountered as a novel designer drug.

== Use and effects ==
4-HO-EPT was not included nor mentioned in Alexander Shulgin's book TiHKAL (Tryptamines I Have Known and Loved).

== Pharmacology ==
=== Pharmacodynamics ===
4-HO-PiPT acts as a serotonin 5-HT_{2A} receptor agonist, with an EC_{50} of 13.8 nM and an efficacy of 104.8%.

== Chemistry ==
=== Analogues ===
Analogues of 4-HO-PiPT include propylisopropyltryptamine (PiPT), 5-MeO-PiPT, 4-HO-MiPT, 4-HO-EiPT, 4-HO-EiBT, 4-HO-DiPT, 4-HO-DsBT, 4-HO-McPT, and 4-HO-McPeT, among others.

== History ==
4-HO-PiPT has been sold as a designer drug, first being identified in 2021 in British Columbia, Canada.

== Society and culture ==
=== Legal status ===
==== Canada ====
4-HO-PiPT is not a controlled substance in Canada as of 2025.

== See also ==
- Substituted tryptamine
- Ebalzotan
