= 4-HO-EiBT =

Chemical compound

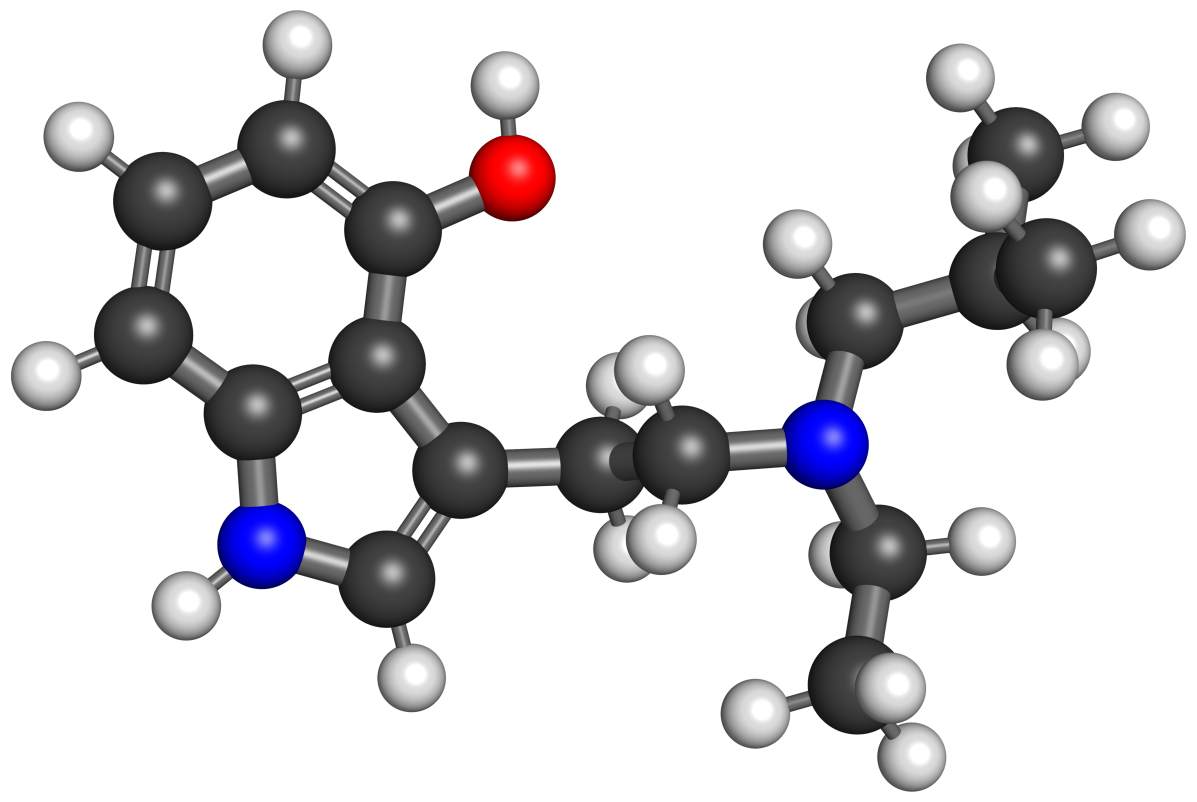

Clinical data
- Other names: 4-Hydroxy-N-ethyl-N-isobutyltryptamine; Eibucin
- Drug class: Serotonin receptor modulator; Serotonin 5-HT_{2A} receptor agonist

Identifiers
- IUPAC name: 3-{2-[(2-methylpropyl)(ethyl)amino]ethyl}-1H-indol-4-ol
- CAS Number: 2945111-65-7
- PubChem CID: 168947050

Chemical and physical data
- Formula: C_{16}H_{24}N_{2}O
- Molar mass: 260.381 g·mol^{−1}
- 3D model (JSmol): Interactive image
- SMILES: CCN(CCc1c[nH]c2cccc(O)c12)CC(C)C
- InChI: InChI=1S/C16H24N2O/c1-4-18(11-12(2)3)9-8-13-10-17-14-6-5-7-15(19)16(13)14/h5-7,10,12,17,19H,4,8-9,11H2,1-3H3; Key:ASUXKVXXFBPGCG-UHFFFAOYSA-N

4-HO-EiBT, also known as 4-hydroxy-N-ethyl-N-isobutyltryptamine or as eibucin, is a substituted tryptamine derivative which acts as a serotonin 5-HT_{2A} receptor agonist, with an EC_{50} of 27.7 nM and an efficacy of 97.5%.

== Chemistry ==
=== Analogues ===
Analogues of 4-HO-EiBT include 4-HO-DiPT, 4-HO-DsBT, 4-HO-McPT, 4-HO-McPeT, 4-HO-MiPT, and 4-HO-PiPT, among others.

== See also ==
- Substituted tryptamine
