= C18H28N2O =

The molecular formula C_{18}H_{28}N_{2}O (molar mass: 288.44 g/mol, exact mass: 288.2202 u) may refer to:

- Bupivacaine
- 4-HO-DBT (4-Hydroxy-N,N-dibutyltryptamine)
- 4-HO-DSBT
- Levobupivacaine
