= C15H22N2 =

The molecular formula C_{15}H_{22}N_{2} may refer to:

- Etaminile
- Ethylisopropyltryptamine
- Ethylpropyltryptamine
- Methylbutyltryptamine
- 2-Me-DET
- 5,N-Dimethyl-N-isopropyltryptamine
