= Dibutyltryptamine =

Chemical compound

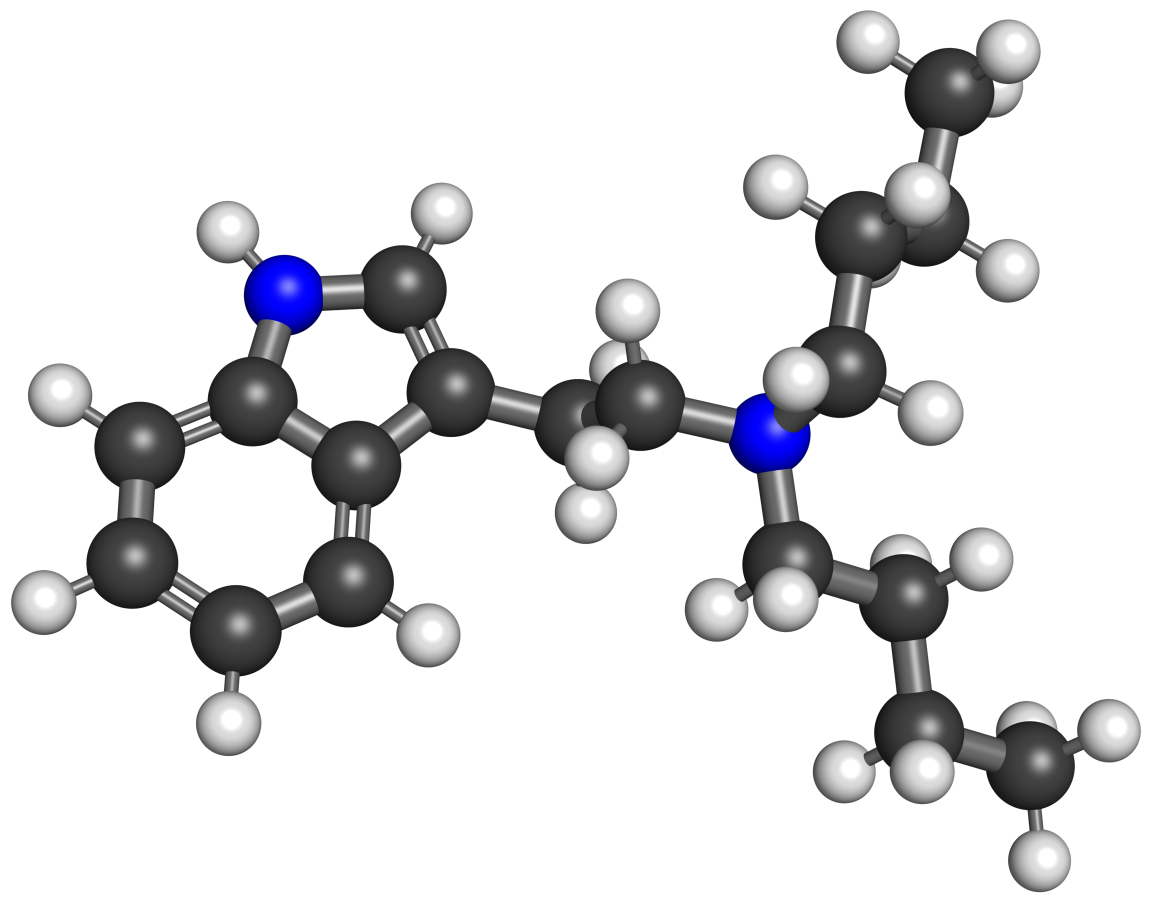

Clinical data
- Other names: N,N-Dibutyltryptamine; DBT; N,N-DBT
- Drug class: Serotonergic psychedelic; Hallucinogen
- ATC code: None

Legal status
- Legal status: DE: NpSG (Industrial and scientific use only); UK: Class A

Identifiers
- IUPAC name: N-butyl-N-[2-(1H-indol-3-yl)ethyl]butan-1-amine
- CAS Number: 15741-77-2
- PubChem CID: 27848
- ChemSpider: 25911
- UNII: QFE8WT8WCW
- CompTox Dashboard (EPA): DTXSID40166255

Chemical and physical data
- Formula: C_{18}H_{28}N_{2}
- Molar mass: 272.436 g·mol^{−1}
- 3D model (JSmol): Interactive image
- Melting point: 186 to 188 °C (367 to 370 °F)
- SMILES: CCCCN(CCCC)CCC1=CNC2=CC=CC=C21
- InChI: InChI=1S/C18H28N2/c1-3-5-12-20(13-6-4-2)14-11-16-15-19-18-10-8-7-9-17(16)18/h7-10,15,19H,3-6,11-14H2,1-2H3; Key:LZLJUZWFWYEQLY-UHFFFAOYSA-N

Dibutyltryptamine (DBT), also known as N,N-dibutyltryptamine (N,N-DBT), is a psychedelic drug of the tryptamine family related to dimethyltryptamine (DMT).

== Use and effects ==
In his book TiHKAL (Tryptamines I Have Known and Loved), Alexander Shulgin reported that a dose of 1 mg/kg DBT by intramuscular injection was active, but less so than dimethyltryptamine (DMT) or diethyltryptamine (DET), producing only slight hallucinogenic effects.

== Pharmacology ==
=== Pharmacodynamics ===
DBT is a serotonin receptor agonist in the rat uterus and rat stomach strip, with similar potency as dimethyltryptamine (DMT). It produces the head-twitch response, a behavioral proxy of psychedelic effects, in mice.

== Chemistry ==
DBT is found either as its crystalline hydrochloride salt or as an oily or crystalline base.

=== Synthesis ===
The chemical synthesis of DBT has been described.

=== Isomers ===
There are four symmetrical isomers of DBT which can be made, or ten isomers in total if unsymmetrical substitution is used. Of these only the n-butyl analogue DBT is known to be active in humans; the isobutyl, sec-butyl, and tert-butyl isomers DIBT, DSBT and DTBT have never been tested and only DBT and DIBT were made by Shulgin.

Chemical structures of DBT and its skeletal isomers
DBT

DiBT

DsBT

DtBT

The unsymmetrical isomers BIBT, BSBT, BTBT, IBSBT, IBTBT and SBTBT are also possible but have never been made and no predictions have been made about their activity. Shulgin speculates that the s-butyl isomer DSBT may be more potent than the straight chain compound DBT, but that the more highly branched DIBT and DTBT would probably be inactive due to the bulk of the substituent group. As for longer chain compounds than butyl, they have not been made and would probably be inactive. Shulgin mentions that the monohexyl compound NHT is without activity. However the unsymmetrical compounds such as methylbutyltryptamine show more promise, and a wide range of possible compounds could be made by pairing the various butyl isomers with methyl, ethyl, propyl, isopropyl or allyl groups.

=== Analogues ===
Analogues of DBT include 4-HO-DBT, 4-HO-DsBT, 5-MeO-DBT, and dihexyltryptamine (DHT), among others.

== History ==
DBT was first described in the scientific literature by 1959.

== Society and culture ==
=== Legal status ===
==== Canada ====
DBT is not a controlled substance in Canada as of 2025.

==== United States ====
DBT is not an explicitly controlled substance in the United States. However, it could be considered a controlled substance under the Federal Analogue Act if intended for human consumption.

== See also ==
- Substituted tryptamine
