= 4-HO-DsBT =

Chemical compound

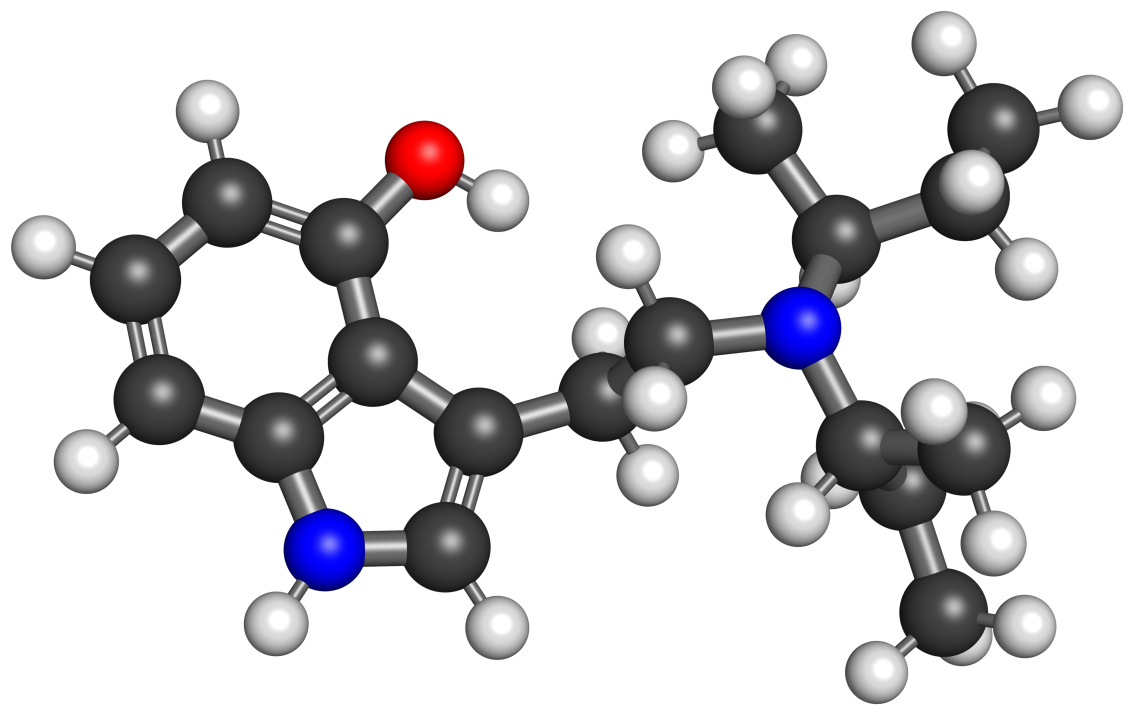

Clinical data
- Other names: 4-HO-DSBT; 4-Hydroxy-N,N-di-sec-butyltryptamine

Identifiers
- IUPAC name: 3-[2-[di(butan-2-yl)amino]ethyl]-1H-indol-4-ol
- CAS Number: 127507-01-1; 4-HO-DBT: 63065-89-4
- PubChem CID: 21786580
- ChemSpider: 10513070
- UNII: E943EL34UU; 4-HO-DBT: R3EY4G4BLQ
- CompTox Dashboard (EPA): DTXSID001045425

Chemical and physical data
- Formula: C_{18}H_{28}N_{2}O
- Molar mass: 288.435 g·mol^{−1}
- 3D model (JSmol): Interactive image
- SMILES: CCC(C)N(CCc1c[nH]c2cccc(O)c12)C(C)CC
- InChI: InChI=1S/C18H28N2O/c1-5-13(3)20(14(4)6-2)11-10-15-12-19-16-8-7-9-17(21)18(15)16/h7-9,12-14,19,21H,5-6,10-11H2,1-4H3; Key:SMKFHUHBZWMALV-UHFFFAOYSA-N

4-HO-DsBT, also known as 4-hydroxy-N,N-di-sec-butyltryptamine, is a tryptamine derivative which acts as a serotonin receptor agonist.

== Use and effects ==
4-HO-DsBT was first made by Alexander Shulgin and is mentioned in his book TiHKAL (Tryptamines I Have Known and Loved), but was never tested by him.

== Pharmacology ==
=== Pharmacodynamics ===
It has been tested in vitro and unlike the n-butyl and isobutyl isomers which are much weaker, the s-butyl derivative retains reasonable potency, with a similar 5-HT_{2A} receptor affinity to MiPT but better selectivity over the 5-HT_{1A} and 5-HT_{2B} subtypes.

== Chemistry ==
=== Analogues ===
Analogues of 4-HO-DsBT include 4-HO-DBT, 4-HO-DiBT, 4-HO-DtBT, 4-HO-DiPT, 4-HO-McPeT, 4-HO-PiPT, 5-MeO-DBT, dibutyltryptamine (DBT), and N-tert-butyltryptamine (NtBT), among others.

== History ==
4-HO-DsBT was first described in the scientific literature by David Repke and colleagues by 1981.

== See also ==
- Substituted tryptamine
- Robalzotan
