= 5-Me-MiPT =

Chemical compound

Clinical data
- Other names: 5,N-Dimethyl-N-isopropyltryptamine; 5-Me-MiPT
- ATC code: None

Identifiers
- IUPAC name: Isopropyl-(2-(1H-indol-3-yl)-ethyl)-methylamine
- CAS Number: 127506-99-4
- ChemSpider: 25991466
- UNII: KZH2ETU2X2

Chemical and physical data
- Formula: C_{15}H_{22}N_{2}
- Molar mass: 230.355 g·mol^{−1}
- 3D model (JSmol): Interactive image
- SMILES: CC(C)N(C)CCc1c[nH]c(cc2)c1cc2C
- InChI: InChI=1S/C15H22N2/c1-11(2)17(4)8-7-13-10-16-15-6-5-12(3)9-14(13)15/h5-6,9-11,16H,7-8H2,1-4H3; Key:SDMXVRZAGORZLX-UHFFFAOYSA-N

5,N-Dimethyl-N-isopropyltryptamine (5-Me-MiPT) is a tryptamine derivative that is thought to be a psychedelic drug. It was first made in 1989. In vitro binding experiments on brain homogenates showed it to have serotonin receptor binding affinity between that of MiPT and 5-MeO-MiPT, both of which are known to be active psychedelics in humans.

== See also ==
- Substituted tryptamine
