= Diamyltryptamine =

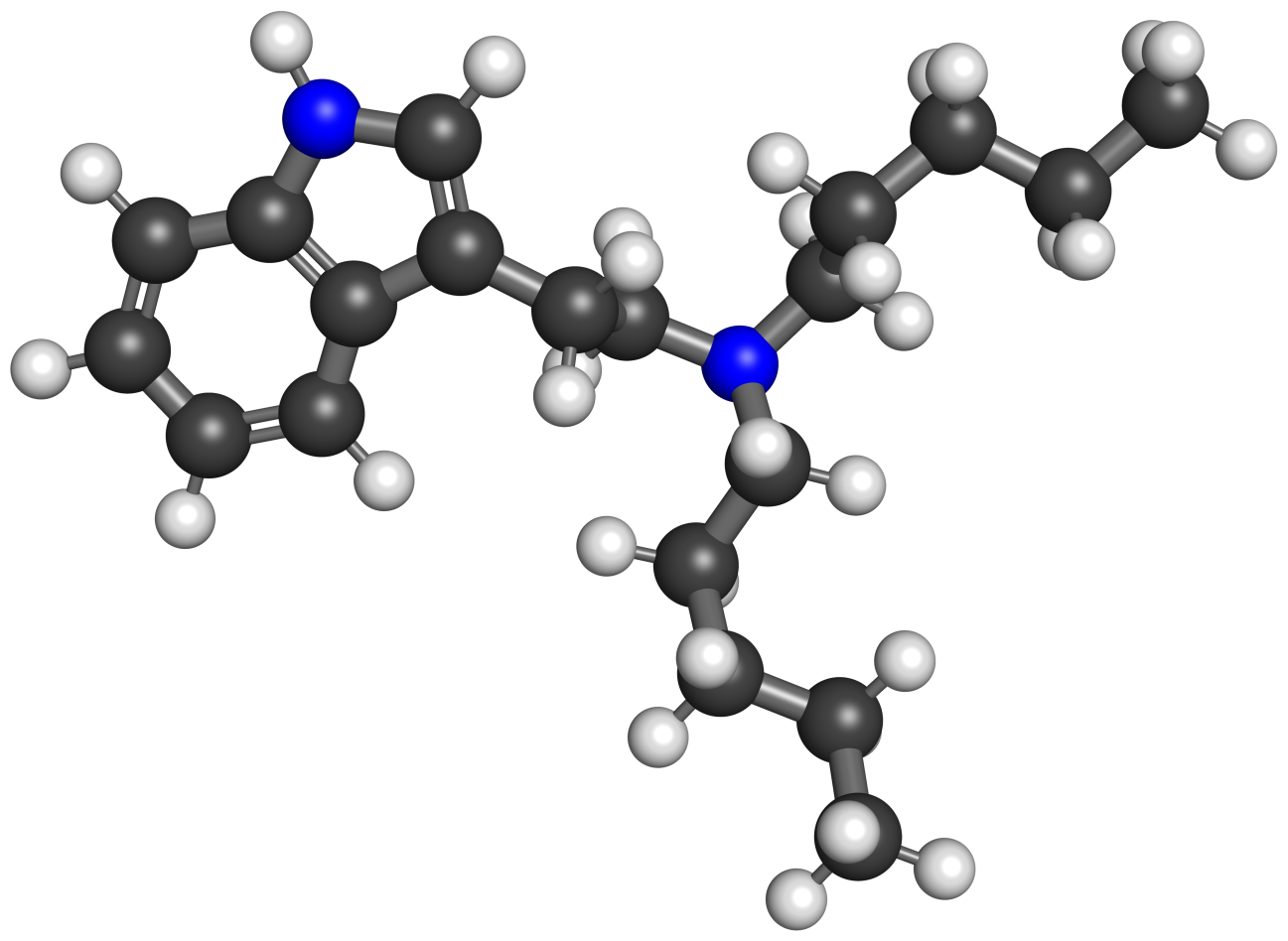

Clinical data
- Other names: DAT; DAmT; N,N-Diamyltryptamine; Dipentyltryptamine; N,N-Dipentyltryptamine; DPeT
- ATC code: None

Pharmacokinetic data
- Onset of action: Unknown
- Duration of action: Unknown

Identifiers
- IUPAC name: N-[2-(1H-indol-3-yl)ethyl]-N-pentylpentan-1-amine

Chemical and physical data
- Formula: C_{20}H_{32}N_{2}
- Molar mass: 300.490 g·mol^{−1}
- 3D model (JSmol): Interactive image
- SMILES: CCCCCN(CCc1c[nH]c2c1cccc2)CCCCC
- InChI: InChI=1S/C20H32N2/c1-3-5-9-14-22(15-10-6-4-2)16-13-18-17-21-20-12-8-7-11-19(18)20/h7-8,11-12,17,21H,3-6,9-10,13-16H2,1-2H3; Key:AXUJSLZQVYSFBL-UHFFFAOYSA-N

Diamyltryptamine (DAT), also known as N,N-dipentyltryptamine, is a chemical compound of the tryptamine family related to dimethyltryptamine (DMT). It is part of the homologous series of tryptamines that includes DMT, diethyltryptamine (DET), dipropyltryptamine (DPT), dibutyltryptamine (DBT), DAT itself, and dihexyltryptamine (DHT).

== Use and effects ==
The compound was briefly mentioned by Alexander Shulgin in his 1997 book TiHKAL (Tryptamines I Have Known and Loved), but he does not appear to have synthesized or tested it. Relatedly, the properties and effects of DAT are unknown. However, it is known that whereas DMT, DET, and DPT are fully effective psychedelics, DBT showed only weak psychedelic effects and DHT was inactive.

== Chemistry ==
=== Analogues ===
==== N-Amyltryptamine ====
Chemical structure of N-amyltrytamine (NAT).

The N-monoamyl analogue of DAT, N-amyltryptamine (NAT), has also been described. According to Stephen Szara and Alexander Shulgin, this compound was inactive at a dose of up to 100 mg orally.

== History ==
DAT was first described in the scientific literature by Stephen Szara and colleagues in 1962, who studied its metabolism (specifically 6-hydroxylation) in vitro.

== See also ==
- Substituted tryptamine
- Dihexyltryptamine (DHT)
