= 5-MeO-DBT =

Chemical compound

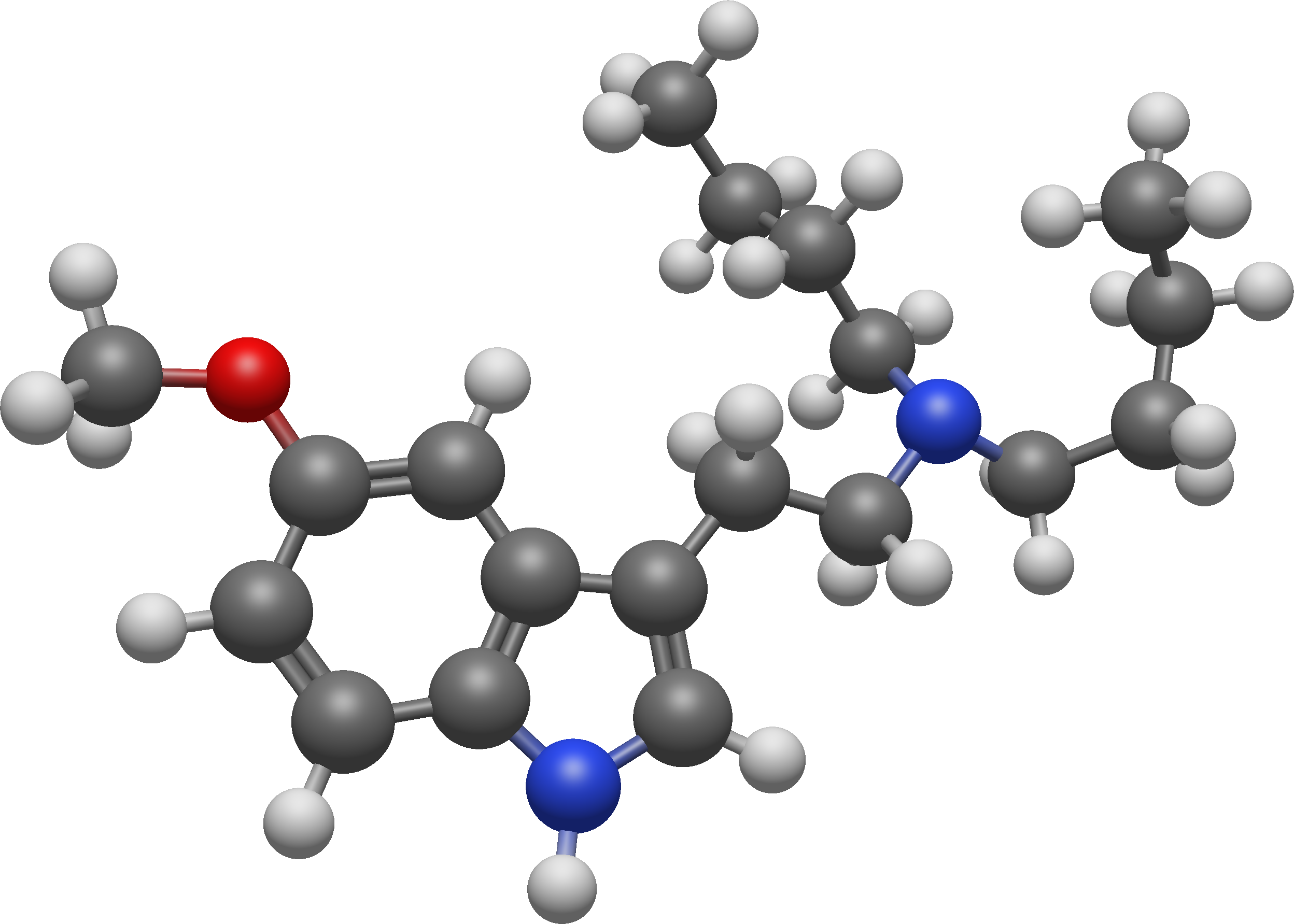

Clinical data
- Other names: 5-OMe-DBT; 5-Methoxy-DBT; 5-Methoxy-N,N-dibutyltryptamine; 5-MeO-BET; N,N-Bu-5-MeO-T
- Drug class: Non-selective serotonin receptor agonist; Serotonin 5-HT_{1A} receptor agonist;
- ATC code: None

Identifiers
- IUPAC name: N-butyl-N-[2-(5-methoxy-1H-indol-3-yl)ethyl]butan-1-amine
- CAS Number: 73785-42-9
- PubChem CID: 53485365
- ChemSpider: 30798625
- UNII: Q454YC4LIK
- CompTox Dashboard (EPA): DTXSID10704547

Chemical and physical data
- Formula: C_{19}H_{30}N_{2}O
- Molar mass: 302.462 g·mol^{−1}
- 3D model (JSmol): Interactive image
- SMILES: CCCCN(CCCC)CCC1=CNC2=C1C=C(C=C2)OC
- InChI: InChI=1S/C19H30N2O/c1-4-6-11-21(12-7-5-2)13-10-16-15-20-19-9-8-17(22-3)14-18(16)19/h8-9,14-15,20H,4-7,10-13H2,1-3H3; Key:WVGCRISHWANOTO-UHFFFAOYSA-N

5-MeO-DBT, also known as 5-methoxy-N,N-dibutyltryptamine, is a serotonin receptor modulator, and a rare substituted tryptamine derivative, which is thought to be a psychoactive substance.

Unlike many other related compounds it exhibits very low efficacy for the 5-HT_{2A} receptor.

5-MeO-DBT was first described in the literature by Alexander Shulgin in his 1997 book TiHKAL (Tryptamines I Have Known and Loved). It was encountered as a novel designer drug by 2019 and was assessed pharmacologically in 2023. The drug is controlled under drug analogue legislation in a number of jurisdictions.

== Use and effects ==
In his book TiHKAL (Tryptamines I Have Known and Loved), Alexander Shulgin briefly mentioned 5-MeO-DBT and described it as a known compound with unknown activity. Relatedly, the properties and effects of 5-MeO-DBT are unknown. In any case, related drugs like dibutyltryptamine (DBT) and 4-HO-DPT have been reported to yield disappointing effects.

== Pharmacology ==
=== Pharmacodynamics ===
5-MeO-DBT activities
Target	Affinity (K_{i}, nM)
5-HT_{1A}	337 (K_{i}); 267 (EC_{50}); 106% (E_{max})
5-HT_{2A}	562 (K_{i}); 620^{a} (EC_{50}); 18%^{a} (E_{max})
5-HT_{2C}	3,130 (K_{i}); 2,400^{a} (EC_{50}); 76%^{a} (E_{max})
SERT	1,180 (K_{i}); 2,120 (IC_{50})
Notes: The smaller the value, the more avidly the drug interacts with the site. Footnotes: ^{a} = Stimulation of IP_{1} formation. Sources:

Based on limited evidence, 5-MeO-DBT acts as a non-selective serotonin receptor agonist with the highest potency and efficacy at the 5-HT_{1A} receptor. It has a similar potency to 5-MeO-MiPT for this target. The substance, unlike many other substituted tryptamines, acts as a very weak and low efficacy partial agonist for the 5-HT_{2A} receptor. Among the group of related tryptamine analogues it also displayed the lowest efficacy for the 5-HT_{2C} receptor.

5-MeO-DBT decreased locomotor activity and failed to substitute for the discriminative stimulus effects of DOM in rodent drug discrimination tests.

== Chemistry ==
=== Analogues ===
Analogues of 5-MeO-DBT include dibutyltryptamine (DBT), 4-HO-DBT, 5-MeO-DMT, 5-MeO-DET, 5-MeO-DPT, 5-MeO-DiPT, 5-MeO-DALT, 5-MeO-DsBT, and 5-MeO-MBT, among others.

== History ==
5-MeO-DBT was first described in the literature by Alexander Shulgin in his 1997 book TiHKAL (Tryptamines I Have Known and Loved). It was encountered as a novel designer drug by 2019.

== Society and culture ==
=== Legal status ===
==== United States ====
===== Alabama =====
5-MeO-DBT was made schedule I at the state level in Alabama on September 13, 2024.

== See also ==
- Substituted tryptamine
