= DHT =

DHT may refer to:

== Science and technology ==
- Discrete Hartley transform, in mathematics
- Distributed hash table, lookup service in computing

=== Chemistry ===
- Dihexyltryptamine, a psychedelic tryptamine-related compound
- Dihydrotestosterone, hormone derived from testosterone
- Dihydrotachysterol, synthetic vitamin D analog

== Other ==
- DHT (band), Belgian dance duo
- Dr Hadwen Trust, UK charity promoting animal experiments alternatives
- Dalhart Municipal Airport, (IATA code), an airport near Dalhart, Texas
- Grande Prairie Daily Herald-Tribune, a newspaper in Canada
- David Hume Tower, the former name of 40 George Square, a University of Edinburgh building
