= 4-AcO-MiPT =

Psychedelic drug

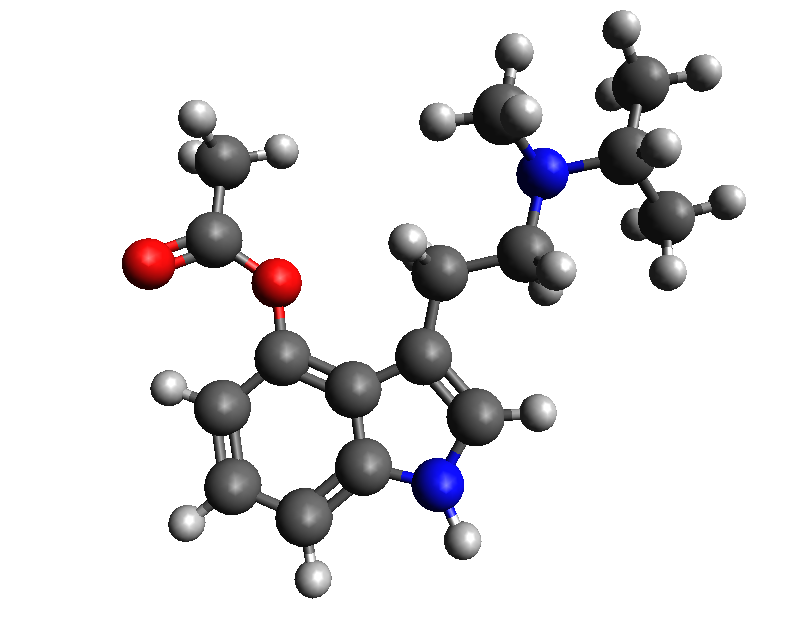

Clinical data
- Other names: 4-Acetoxy-N-methyl-N-isopropyltryptamine; Mipracetin

Identifiers
- IUPAC name: 3-{2-[methyl(propan-2-yl)amino]ethyl}-1H-indol-4-yl acetate
- CAS Number: 1024612-25-6
- PubChem CID: 46783587
- ChemSpider: 23976075
- UNII: SS93IMV779
- CompTox Dashboard (EPA): DTXSID70676236

Chemical and physical data
- Formula: C_{16}H_{22}N_{2}O_{2}
- Molar mass: 274.364 g·mol^{−1}
- 3D model (JSmol): Interactive image
- SMILES: CC(N(CCC1=CNC2=C1C(OC(C)=O)=CC=C2)C)C
- InChI: InChI=1S/C16H22N2O2/c1-11(2)18(4)9-8-13-10-17-14-6-5-7-15(16(13)14)20-12(3)19/h5-7,10-11,17H,8-9H2,1-4H3; Key:CIDMXLOVFPIHDS-UHFFFAOYSA-N

4-AcO-MiPT, also known as 4-acetoxy-N-methyl-N-isopropyltryptamine or as mipracetin, is a psychedelic tryptamine. It is closely related to 4-AcO-DMT and methylisopropyltryptamine (MiPT).

There is very little information on the human pharmacology or toxicity of 4-AcO-MiPT, although analytical methods have been developed for its detection.

== Chemistry ==
Analogues of 4-AcO-MiPT include methylisopropyltryptamine (MiPT), 4-HO-MiPT (miprocin), 5-MeO-MiPT, 4-AcO-DMT (psilacetin), 4-AcO-MET (metacetin), 4-AcO-MPT, 4-AcO-MALT, and 4-AcO-DiPT (ipracetin), among others.

== Society and culture ==
=== Legal status ===
==== Canada ====
4-AcO-MiPT is not a controlled substance in Canada as of 2025.

==== Poland ====
4-AcO-MiPT has been a controlled substance in Poland since April 6, 2021, and is classified as a new psychoactive substance.

==== Sweden ====
Sveriges riksdags health ministry Statens folkhälsoinstitut classified 4-AcO-MiPT as "health hazard" under the act Lagen om förbud mot vissa hälsofarliga varor (translated Act on the Prohibition of Certain Goods Dangerous to Health) as of Nov 1, 2005, in their regulation SFS 2005:733 listed as 4-acetoxi-N,N-metylisopropyltryptamin (4-AcO-MIPT), making it illegal to sell or possess.

==== United States ====
4-AcO-MiPT is not an explicitly controlled substance in the United States. However, it could be considered a controlled substance under the Federal Analogue Act if intended for human consumption.

== See also ==
- Substituted tryptamine
