= Methylbutyltryptamine =

Psychedelic drug

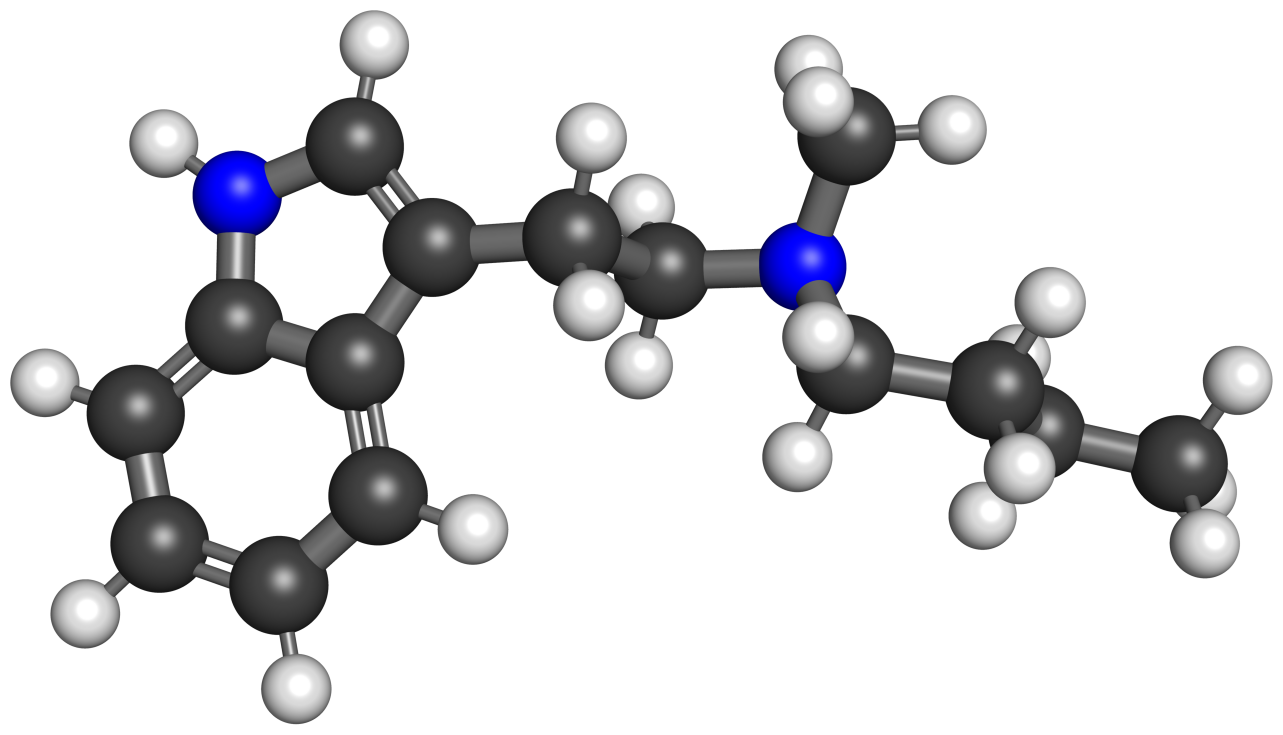

Clinical data
- Other names: MBT; N-Methyl-N-butyltryptamine
- Routes of administration: Oral
- Drug class: Serotonergic psychedelic; Hallucinogen
- ATC code: None

Pharmacokinetic data
- Duration of action: 4–6 hours

Identifiers
- IUPAC name: N-[2-(1H-indol-3-yl)ethyl]-N-methylbutan-1-amine
- CAS Number: 848130-12-1
- PubChem CID: 44719457
- ChemSpider: 21106349
- UNII: UQ2K8W783S
- CompTox Dashboard (EPA): DTXSID501016744

Chemical and physical data
- Formula: C_{15}H_{22}N_{2}
- Molar mass: 230.355 g·mol^{−1}
- 3D model (JSmol): Interactive image
- SMILES: CCCCN(C)CCC1=CNC2=CC=CC=C21
- InChI: InChI=1S/C15H22N2/c1-3-4-10-17(2)11-9-13-12-16-15-8-6-5-7-14(13)15/h5-8,12,16H,3-4,9-11H2,1-2H3; Key:PUEYINPKMCBJCA-UHFFFAOYSA-N

Methylbutyltryptamine (MBT), also known as N-methyl-N-butyltryptamine, is a lesser-known psychedelic drug of the tryptamine family related to dimethyltryptamine (DMT).

== Use and effects ==
In his book TiHKAL (Tryptamines I Have Known and Loved), Alexander Shulgin lists the dose of MBT as 250 to 400 mg orally and the duration as 4 to 6 hours. MBT produces a heavy body load with dehydration, and causes visuals similar to those of DMT. Very little data exists about the pharmacological properties, metabolism, and toxicity of MBT.

== Chemistry ==
=== Synthesis ===
The chemical synthesis of MBT has been described.

=== Analogues ===
Analogues of MBT include 4-HO-MBT, 5-MeO-MBT, methylethyltryptamine (MET), methylpropyltryptamine (MPT), methylisopropyltryptamine (MiPT), methylallyltryptamine (MALT), among others.

==== MSBT ====
TiHKAL mentions that a structural isomer of MBT exists, with the butyl group attached at the nitrogen atom with its second carbon, making it a sec-butyl group, instead of n-butyl. It is known as N-sec-butyl-N-methyltryptamine, or MSBT. However, little is known about its psychoactivity.

== See also ==
- Substituted tryptamine
