= Constantino Manuel Torres =

Constantino Manuel Torres, known as Manuel Torres, is an archaeologist and ethnobotanist specialising in the ethnobotany of pre-columbian South America and the Caribbean. In particular, he has shed much light on the Taíno use of Anadenanthera snuff Cohoba, its paraphernalia and associated archaeology.

== Selected published works ==
- The Use of Anadenanthera colubrina var. Cebil by Wichi (Mataco) Shamans of the Chaco Central, Argentina. Yearbook for ethnomedicine and the study of consciousness 5: 41–58, with David Repke as second author. Verläg für Wissenschaft und Bildung, Berlin, (1998).
- The role of cohoba in Taíno shamanism. Eleusis, n.s., no. 1: 38–50, Museo Civico di Rovereto, Trento, Italy, (1998).
- Exploring the San Pedro de Atacama/Tiahuanaco Relationship. In Penny Dransart, ed., Andean Art -Visual Expression and its Relationship with Andean Values and Beliefs, Worldwide Archaeology Series vol. 13, pp. 78–108, with William J Conklin as second author, Avebury Press, Great Britain, (1995).
- Iconografía Tiwanaku y Alucinógenos en San Pedro de Atacama: Sus Implicaciones para el Estudio del Horizonte Medio Andino. In Josep María Fericgla, ed., Plantas, chamanismo y estados de consciencia, pp. 151–173, Los Libros de la Liebre de Marzo, Barcelona, Catalunya, Spain, (1994).
- Snuff Powders from Pre-Hispanic San Pedro de Atacama: Chemical and Contextual Analysis. Co-authored with D. Repke, K. Chan, D. McKenna, A. Llagostera, and R. E. Schultes. Current Anthropology 32(5): 640–649, University of Chicago Press, (1991).
- The Iconography of South American Snuff Trays and Related Paraphernalia. Etnologiska Studier Series, no. 37, 305 pp., 193 plates. Göteborgs Etnografiska Museum, Sweden, (1987).
- Anadenanthera: Visionary Plant of Ancient South America. Co-authored with David B. Repke. Haworth Press, (2005)
