= David Repke =

Chemist

David B. Repke BSc
- Other name: David B. Repke
- Education: Michigan Technological University (BSc; 1966–1970)
- Occupation: Medicinal chemist
- Years active: 1973–2010
- Employer(s): Syntex, Roche
- Known for: Work in the area of psychedelic tryptamines
- Notable work: Anadenanthera: Visionary Plant of Ancient South America (2006)
- Website: www.linkedin.com/in/david-repke-bb5b6343/

David Repke, or David B. Repke, is an American medicinal chemist who has done work in the area of psychedelic drugs. He and his colleagues are known to have been the first to synthesize and describe a number of notable psychedelic tryptamines, including 4-HO-MET, 4-HO-MPT, 4-HO-DPT, 4-HO-DBT, 4-HO-DiPT, MiPT, 4-HO-MiPT, 5-MeO-MiPT, 4-HO-McPeT, and 4-HO-pyr-T, among others. He is known to have collaborated with Alexander Shulgin and Dennis McKenna on scientific work. Both Repke and Shulgin conducted self-experimentation with the novel psychedelics they developed. Repke developed an improved chemical synthesis of 4-hydroxytryptamines in the 1980s. He has also published a book on the entheogenic use of Anadenanthera in South America that was coauthored with Constantino Manuel Torres.

== Selected publications ==
=== Books ===
- Torres, Constantino Manuel; Repke, David B. (2006). Anadenanthera: Visionary Plant of Ancient South America. Routledge. doi:10.4324/9781315864594. ISBN 978-1-315-86459-4.

=== Journal articles ===
- Repke, David B.; Ferguson, Wilfred J. (1976). "Synthesis of S (+) and R (-)-3-(2-aminopropyl)indole from ethyl- D - and L -tryptophanate". Journal of Heterocyclic Chemistry. 13 (4): 775–778. doi:10.1002/jhet.5570130417. ISSN 0022-152X.
- Repke, David B.; Leslie, Dale Thomas (1977). "Baeocystin in Psilocybe semilanceata". Journal of Pharmaceutical Sciences. 66 (1): 113–114. Bibcode:1977JPhmS..66..113R. doi:10.1002/jps.2600660130. PMID 556766.
- Ferguson WJ, Bates DK, Repke DB (1977). "Psilocin analogs. 1. Synthesis of 3-[2-(dialkylamino)ethyl] -and 3-[2-(cycloalkylamino)ethyl] indol-4-ols". Journal of Heterocyclic Chemistry. 14 (1): 71–74. doi:10.1002/jhet.5570140113. ISSN 0022-152X.
- Repke DB, Ferguson WJ, Bates DK (1981). "Psilocin analogs II. Synthesis of 3-[2-(dialkylamino)ethyl]-, 3-[2-(N-methyl-N-alkylamino)ethyl]-, and 3-[2-(cycloalkylamino)ethyl]indol-4-ols". Journal of Heterocyclic Chemistry. 18 (1): 175–179. doi:10.1002/jhet.5570180131. ISSN 0022-152X.
- Repke, David B.; Ferguson, Wilfred J. (1982). "Psilocin analogs. III. Synthesis of 5-methoxy- and 5-hydroxy-1,2,3,4-tetrahydro-9 H -pyrido[3,4- b ]indoles". Journal of Heterocyclic Chemistry. 19 (4): 845–848. doi:10.1002/jhet.5570190428. ISSN 0022-152X.
- Repke DB, Grotjahn DB, Shulgin AT (July 1985). "Psychotomimetic N-methyl-N-isopropyltryptamines. Effects of variation of aromatic oxygen substituents". J Med Chem. 28 (7): 892–896. doi:10.1021/jm00145a007. PMID 4009612.
- McKenna DJ, Repke DB, Peroutka SJ (1989). "Hallucinogenic indolealkylamines are selective for 5HT2A binding sites". Neuroscience Abstract. 15: 485–.
- McKenna DJ, Repke DB, Lo L, Peroutka SJ (March 1990). "Differential interactions of indolealkylamines with 5-hydroxytryptamine receptor subtypes". Neuropharmacology. 29 (3): 193–198. doi:10.1016/0028-3908(90)90001-8. PMID 2139186.
- Torres, Constantino Manuel; Repke, David B.; Chan, Kelvin; McKenna, Dennis; Llagostera, Agustin; Schultes, Richard Evans (1991). "Snuff Powders from Pre-Hispanic San Pedro de Atacama: Chemical and Contextual Analysis". Current Anthropology. 32 (5): 640–649. doi:10.1086/204014. ISSN 0011-3204.
- Repke, David B.; Artis, Dean R.; Nelson, Janis T.; Wong, Erik H. F. (1994). "Abbreviated Ibogaine Congeners. Synthesis and Reactions of Tropan-3-yl-2- and -3-indoles. Investigation of an Unusual Isomerization of 2-Substituted Indoles Using Computational and Spectroscopic Techniques". The Journal of Organic Chemistry. 59 (8): 2164–2171. doi:10.1021/jo00087a037. ISSN 0022-3263.

=== Book chapters ===
- Torres CM, Repke D (1996). "The use of Anadenanthera colubrina var. cebil by Wichi (Mataco) Shamans of the Chaco Central, Argentina". Jahrbuch für Ethnomedizin und Bewußtseinsforschung [Yearbook for Ethnomedicine and the Study of Consciousness]. Vol. 5. pp. 41–58.

== See also ==
- List of psychedelic chemists
- Daniel Trachsel
