= 4-HO-McPeT =

Chemical compound

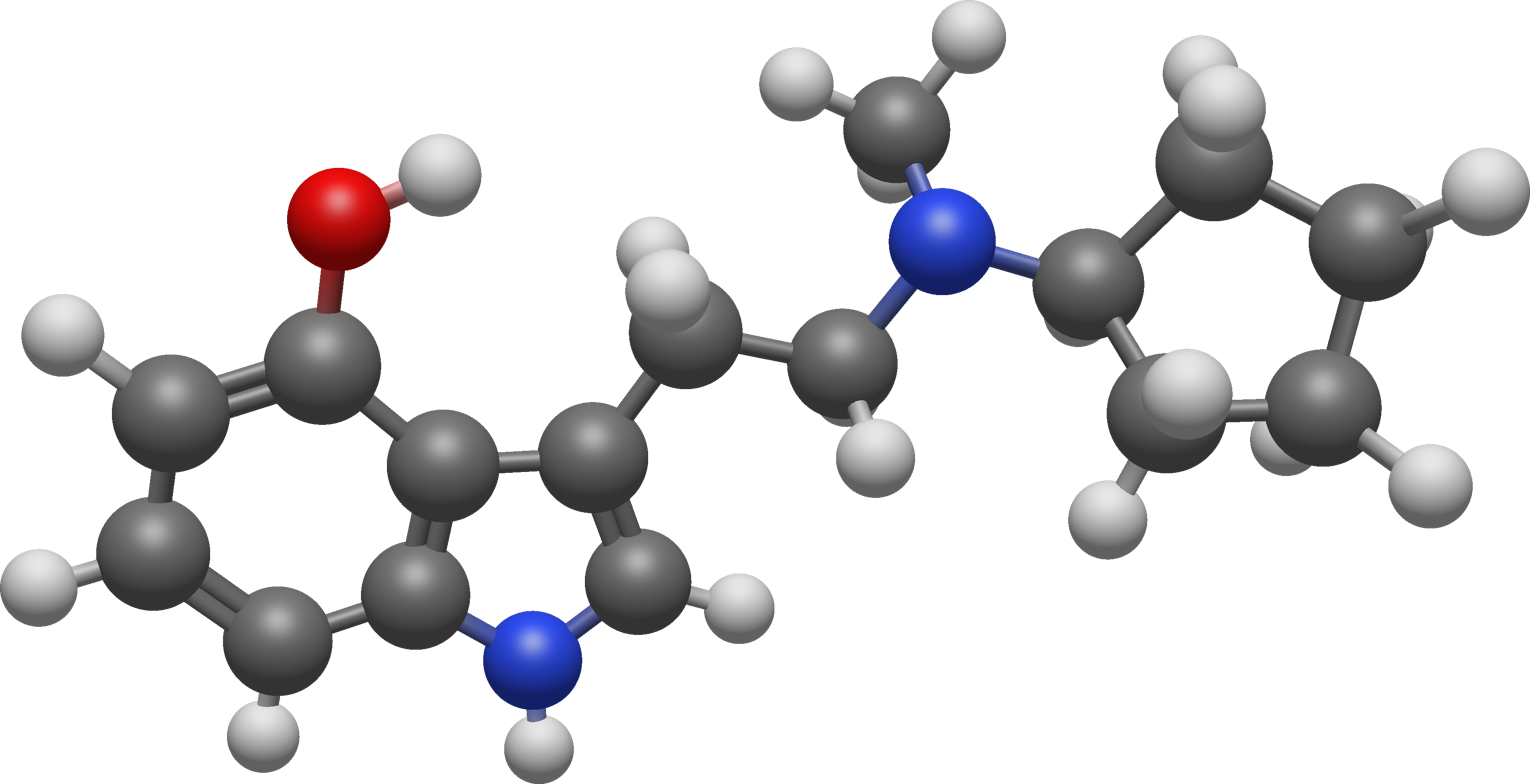

Clinical data
- Other names: 4-OH-McPeT; 4-Hydroxy-N-methyl-N-cyclopentyltryptamine
- ATC code: None

Identifiers
- IUPAC name: 3-[2-[cyclopentyl(methyl)amino]ethyl]-1H-indol-4-ol
- CAS Number: 77872-48-1
- PubChem CID: 21786595
- ChemSpider: 10513085
- UNII: 3R9FYL6TXX
- CompTox Dashboard (EPA): DTXSID801337076

Chemical and physical data
- Formula: C_{16}H_{22}N_{2}O
- Molar mass: 258.365 g·mol^{−1}
- 3D model (JSmol): Interactive image
- SMILES: CN(CCC1=CNC2=C1C(=CC=C2)O)C3CCCC3
- InChI: InChI=1S/C16H22N2O/c1-18(13-5-2-3-6-13)10-9-12-11-17-14-7-4-8-15(19)16(12)14/h4,7-8,11,13,17,19H,2-3,5-6,9-10H2,1H3; Key:QTXSMWNGMGYWTA-UHFFFAOYSA-N

4-HO-McPeT, also known as 4-hydroxy-N-methyl-N-cyclopentyltryptamine, is a tryptamine derivative related to known psychedelic tryptamines like psilocin (4-HO-DMT). It was described in the scientific literature by David Repke and colleagues in 1981.

== Chemistry ==
=== Analogues ===
Analogues of 4-HO-McPeT include 4-HO-McPT, 4-HO-DsBT, 4-HO-MPMI, 4-HO-pyr-T, and PiPT, among others.

== See also ==
- Substituted tryptamine
