= Dihexyltryptamine =

Clinical data
- Other names: N,N-Dihexyltryptamine; DHT

Identifiers
- IUPAC name: N-hexyl-N-[2-(1H-indol-3-yl)ethyl]hexan-1-amine
- PubChem CID: 129679089
- ChemSpider: 102826556

Chemical and physical data
- Formula: C_{22}H_{36}N_{2}
- Molar mass: 328.544 g·mol^{−1}
- 3D model (JSmol): Interactive image
- SMILES: CCCCCCN(CCCCCC)CCC1=CNC2=CC=CC=C21
- InChI: InChI=1S/C22H36N2/c1-3-5-7-11-16-24(17-12-8-6-4-2)18-15-20-19-23-22-14-10-9-13-21(20)22/h9-10,13-14,19,23H,3-8,11-12,15-18H2,1-2H3; Key:GTQCUMXNKPVMON-UHFFFAOYSA-N

Dihexyltryptamine (DHT), or N,N-dihexyltryptamine, is a drug of the tryptamine family related to serotonergic psychedelics like dimethyltryptamine (DMT). It is an analogue in the structural series of N,N-dialkylated tryptamines that also includes DMT, diethyltryptamine (DET), dipropyltryptamine (DPT), dibutyltryptamine (DBT), and diamyltryptamine (DAT).

== Use and effects ==
DHT, in contrast to its lower homologues including DMT, DET, DPT, and DBT, was completely inactive in terms of hallucinogenic and other effects at a dose of 1 mg/kg in humans. With regard to the lower homologues, DMT, DET, and DPT are all described as fully effective hallucinogens, whereas DBT was described as producing only slight hallucinogenic effects.

== Pharmacology ==
=== Pharmacodynamics ===
The drug is active in the conditioned avoidance test and produces dose-dependent hypolocomotion in rodents similarly to psychedelic tryptamines.

== Chemistry ==
=== Analogues ===
Analogues of DHT include diethyltryptamine (DET), dipropyltryptamine (DPT), diisopropyltryptamine (DiPT), diallyltryptamine (DALT), and dibutyltryptamine (DBT), among others.

==== N-Hexyltryptamine ====
Chemical structure of N-hexyltrytamine (NHT).

The N-monohexyl analogue of DHT, N-hexyltryptamine (NHT), has also been described. According to Stephen Szara and Alexander Shulgin, this compound was inactive at a dose of up to 100 mg orally.

== History ==
DHT was first described by Stephen Szára and colleagues in 1961. It was briefly mentioned by Alexander Shulgin in his 1997 book TiHKAL, but does not appear to have been synthesized or evaluated by him.

== See also ==
- Substituted tryptamine
