= 5-MeO-MBT =

Clinical data
- Other names: 5-Methoxy-N-methyl-N-butyltryptamine; n-butyl-5-MeO-NMT
- Drug class: Serotonin receptor modulator; Serotonin 5-HT_{2A} receptor agonist
- ATC code: None

Identifiers
- IUPAC name: N-[2-(5-methoxy-1H-indol-3-yl)ethyl]-N-methylbutan-1-amine

Chemical and physical data
- Formula: C_{16}H_{24}N_{2}O
- Molar mass: 260.381 g·mol^{−1}
- 3D model (JSmol): Interactive image
- SMILES: CCCCN(CCC1=CNC2=C1C=C(OC)C=C2)C
- InChI: InChI=1S/C16H24N2O/c1-4-5-9-18(2)10-8-13-12-17-16-7-6-14(19-3)11-15(13)16/h6-7,11-12,17H,4-5,8-10H2,1-3H3; Key:LQYCKXWTNNBJGQ-UHFFFAOYSA-N

5-MeO-MBT, also known as 5-methoxy-N-methyl-N-butyltryptamine, is a serotonin receptor modulator of the tryptamine and 5-methoxytryptamine families related to 5-MeO-DMT.

The drug was not included nor mentioned in Alexander Shulgin's book TiHKAL (Tryptamines I Have Known and Loved) and its properties and effects in humans are unknown.

It shows affinity for the serotonin 5-HT_{1A}, 5-HT_{2A}, and 5-HT_{2C} receptors (K_{i} = 10 nM, 721 nM, and 252 nM, respectively). The drug is a partial agonist of the serotonin 5-HT_{2A} receptor (EC_{50} = 1,318 nM; E_{max} = 38–47%). Its affinities for the serotonin 5-HT_{1A}, 5-HT_{2A}, and 5-HT_{2C} receptors were similar to those of 5-MeO-DMT, and it showed only 1.8-fold lower activational potency at the serotonin 5-HT_{2A} receptor, but it had much lower efficacy in activating the receptor in comparison (E_{max} = 38–47% and 98%, respectively).

The chemical synthesis of 5-MeO-MBT has been described. 5-MeO-MBT has several possible positional isomers, including 5-MeO-MiBT, 5-MeO-MsBT, and 5-MeO-MtBT.

5-MeO-MBT was first described in the scientific literature by Niels Jensen in 2004.

== See also ==
- Substituted tryptamine
- 5-MeO-DBT
