= 4-HO-MiPT =

Psychedelic drug

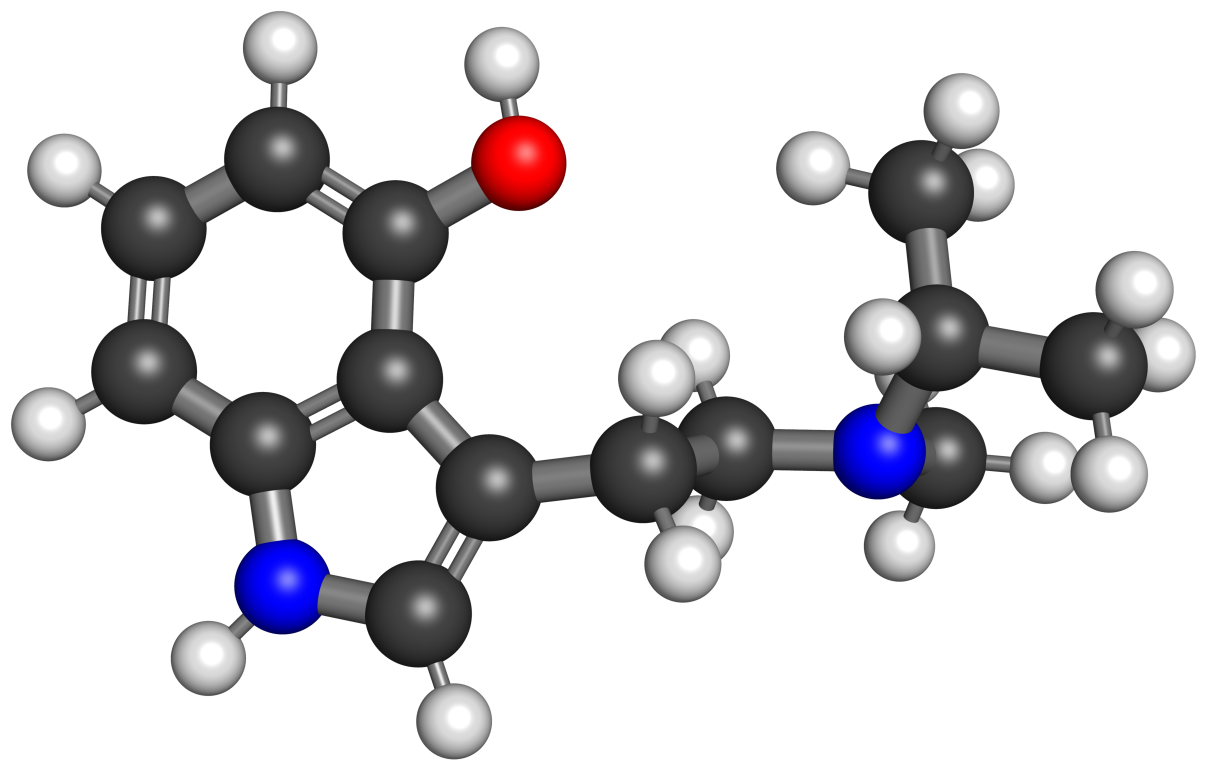

Clinical data
- Other names: 4-OH-MiPT; 4-Hydroxy-N-methyl-N-isopropyltryptamine; Miprocin
- Routes of administration: Oral
- Drug class: Non-selective serotonin receptor agonist; Serotonin 5-HT_{2A} receptor agonist; Serotonergic psychedelic; Hallucinogen
- ATC code: None

Legal status
- Legal status: BR: Class F2 (Prohibited psychotropics); DE: NpSG (Industrial and scientific use only); UK: Class A; US: Unscheduled

Pharmacokinetic data
- Onset of action: 10–20 minutes
- Duration of action: 4–6 hours

Identifiers
- IUPAC name: 3-{2-[methyl(propan-2-yl)amino]ethyl}-1H-indol-4-ol
- CAS Number: 77872-43-6
- PubChem CID: 10082683
- ChemSpider: 8258221
- UNII: 4GAJ9OJ8YZ
- ChEMBL: ChEMBL171419
- CompTox Dashboard (EPA): DTXSID30228492

Chemical and physical data
- Formula: C_{14}H_{20}N_{2}O
- Molar mass: 232.327 g·mol^{−1}
- 3D model (JSmol): Interactive image
- Melting point: 123 to 125 °C (253 to 257 °F)
- SMILES: CN(C(C)C)CCC2=CNC1=CC=CC(O)=C12
- InChI: InChI=1S/C14H20N2O/c1-10(2)16(3)8-7-11-9-15-12-5-4-6-13(17)14(11)12/h4-6,9-10,15,17H,7-8H2,1-3H3; Key:RXKGHZCQFXXWFQ-UHFFFAOYSA-N

4-HO-MiPT, also known as 4-hydroxy-N-methyl-N-isopropyltryptamine or as miprocin, is a psychedelic drug of the tryptamine and 4-hydroxytryptamine families related to psilocin (4-HO-DMT). It appears to be similar to psilocin in terms of onset, duration, and effects. The drug is taken orally.

It acts as a non-selective serotonin receptor agonist, including of the serotonin 5-HT_{2A} receptor among others. The drug is closely related structurally to MiPT, 4-HO-DiPT, and psilocin (4-HO-DMT).

4-HO-MiPT was first described in the literature by David Repke and colleagues in 1981. Its effects in humans were subsequently described by Repke and Alexander Shulgin in 1985 and 1997. The drug was first encountered as a novel designer drug by 2010.

== Use and effects ==
In his book TiHKAL (Tryptamines I Have Known and Loved) and other publications, Alexander Shulgin lists 4-HO-MiPT's dose range as 12 to 25 mg orally, its onset as 10 to 20 minutes, its time to peak effects as 40 to 45 minutes, and its duration of 4 to 6 hours. It has an estimated typical dose of 18.5 mg. Based on very limited assessment, the drug has been described as being at least twice as potent as psilocin (4-HO-DMT) at comparable doses, with 20 mg 4-HO-MiPT being subjectively stronger than 50 mg psilocin in one individual. However, the effects of 4-AcO-MiPT (a prodrug of 4-HO-MiPT) at a dose of 30 mg were described as considerably more modest than expected in another person.

The effects of 4-HO-MiPT have been reported to include closed-eye visuals, vivid mental imagery, few psychedelic visuals, wave-form visuals, intense color alterations, multiple images of the same object with intense colored halos, illusory alteration of the size and distance of objects, heightening of senses, intensification and enhanced discrimination of sounds, increased sense of bodily processes such as blood flow and muscles, synesthesia of sound and sight, intense alteration in sense of time and distance, and feelings of drifting in and out of the body. Additional effects included flight of ideas, philosophical thinking, euphoria, enhanced music appreciation, enhanced eroticism, and facilitation of love, insights, fantasy, introspection, and discovery. Other effects included intoxication, sedation, feeling drunk, relaxation, some initial anxiety, easy to difficult verbal communication, easy distraction and annoyance by external stimuli such as light, appetite loss, and insomnia. Physical effects of the drug have been reported to include twitching, muscle sensations, motor incoordination, slight lightheadedness, mild vertigo, jaw clenching, and body tremors.

== Pharmacology ==
=== Pharmacodynamics ===
4-HO-MiPT activities
Target	Affinity (K_{i}, nM)
5-HT_{1A}	1,626–5,870 (K_{i}); 2,590 (EC_{50}); 83% (E_{max})
5-HT_{1B}	>10,000
5-HT_{1D}	1,415
5-HT_{1E}	614
5-HT_{2A}	113–695 (K_{i}); 5.2–306^{a} (EC_{50}); 74^{a}–102% (E_{max})
5-HT_{2B}	66 (K_{i}); 10.3–14.8 (EC_{50}); 49–65% (E_{max})
5-HT_{2C}	750–1,301 (K_{i}); 166–325 (EC_{50}); 68–98%^{a} (E_{max})
5-HT_{3}	>10,000
5-HT_{5A}	>10,000
5-HT_{6}	390
5-HT_{7}	1,038
α_{2A}_{,} α_{2B}, α_{2C}	>10,000
H_{1}	1,272
σ_{1}	>10,000
σ_{2}	2,765
SERT	248–483 (K_{i}); 373–423 (IC_{50})
NET, DAT	>10,000
Notes: The smaller the value, the more avidly the drug interacts with the site. Footnotes: ^{a} = Stimulation of IP_{1} formation. Sources:

4-HO-MiPT acts as a non-selective serotonin receptor agonist, including of the serotonin 5-HT_{2A}, 5-HT_{2B}, and 5-HT_{2C} receptors. It shows the highest potency and efficacy as an agonist of the 5-HT_{2A} receptor, moderate potency as a partial agonist of the 5-HT_{2B} receptor, and low potency with high-efficacy as a partial agonist of the 5-HT_{2C} receptor. Additionally, the drug has been found to act as a moderate-potency serotonin transporter (SERT) blocker or serotonin reuptake inhibitor. Its low affinity and potency at the 5-HT_{1A} receptor suggest minimal contribution to this drug's effects. 4-HO-MiPT exhibits approximately 7-fold selectivity for activation of the serotonin 5-HT_{2A} receptor over the serotonin 5-HT_{2C} receptor, and 4-fold preference relative to SERT inhibition. Affinities towards receptors outside of the serotonin receptor family are low.

The drug induces the head-twitch response, a behavioral proxy of psychedelic effects, in rodents. Its potency for inducing the head-twitch response in mice is about 4- or 5-fold lower than that of psilocin.

==== Pharmacokinetics ====
As of February 2026, no studies have characterized the pharmacokinetics of 4‑HO‑MiPT.

== Chemistry ==
4-HO-MiPT, also known as 4-hydroxy-N-methyl-N-isopropyltryptamine, is a synthetic derivative of the substituted tryptamine and 4-hydroxytryptamine families. It is the 4-hydroxy analogue of N-methyl-N-isopropyltryptamine (MiPT) and the N-isopropyl homologue of psilocin (4-HO-DMT).

=== Properties ===
4-HO-MiPT appears to be a relatively unstable compound, discoloring quickly if not kept in an inert atmosphere and in a freezer. The drug and its prodrug analogue 4-AcO-MiPT have been used as the free base, hydrochloride salt, and fumarate salt.

=== Crystal structure ===
In August 2019, Chadeayne et al. solved the crystal structure of 4-HO-MiPT fumarate. Its systematic name is [2-(4-hydroxy-1H-indol-3-yl)ethyl](methyl)propan-2-ylazanium 3-carboxyprop-2-enoate monohydrate. The salt consists of a protonated tryptammonium cation and a 3-carboxyacrylate (hydrogen fumarate) anion in the asymmetric unit along with a water molecule of crystallization.

=== Synthesis ===
The chemical synthesis of 4-HO-MiPT has been described.

=== Analogues ===
Analogues of 4-HO-MiPT include N-methyl-N-isopropyltryptamine (MiPT), 4-AcO-MiPT, 4-MeO-MiPT, 5-MeO-MiPT, 4,5-MDO-MiPT, 4-HO-DiPT, psilocin (4-HO-DMT), 4-HO-MET, 4-HO-EiBT, and 4-HO-McPT, among others.

== History ==
4-HO-MiPT was first described in the scientific literature by David Repke and colleagues in 1981. Its effects in humans were described by Repke and Alexander Shulgin and colleagues in 1985. The pharmacology of 4-HO-MiPT at serotonin receptors was described by Dennis McKenna and Repke and colleagues in 1990. The effects of 4-HO-MiPT in humans were described in greater detail by Shulgin in his 1997 book TiHKAL (Tryptamines I Have Known and Loved). 4-HO-MiPT was first encountered as a novel designer drug in the United States in 2010.

== Society and culture ==
=== Legal status ===
==== Canada ====
4-HO-MiPT is not a controlled substance in Canada as of 2025.

==== Russia ====
4-HO-MiPT is in Schedule 1 in Russia as an analog of 4-hydroxytryptamine.

==== Sweden ====
Sveriges riksdags health ministry Statens folkhälsoinstitut classified 4-HO-MiPT as "health hazard" under the act Lagen om förbud mot vissa hälsofarliga varor (translated Act on the Prohibition of Certain Goods Dangerous to Health) as of 1 November 2005, in regulation SFS 2005:733 listed as "4-hydroxi-N,N-metylisopropyltryptamin (4-HO-MIPT)", making it illegal to sell or possess.

==== United Kingdom ====
The substance could also be considered illegal in the United Kingdom under the Misuse of Drugs Act 1971.

==== United States ====
4-HO-MiPT is an unscheduled drug in the United States. However, it is arguably an analog of psilocin, which could lead to prosecution under the Federal Analog Act.

== See also ==
- Substituted tryptamine
