= 5-MeO-MiPT =

Chemical compound

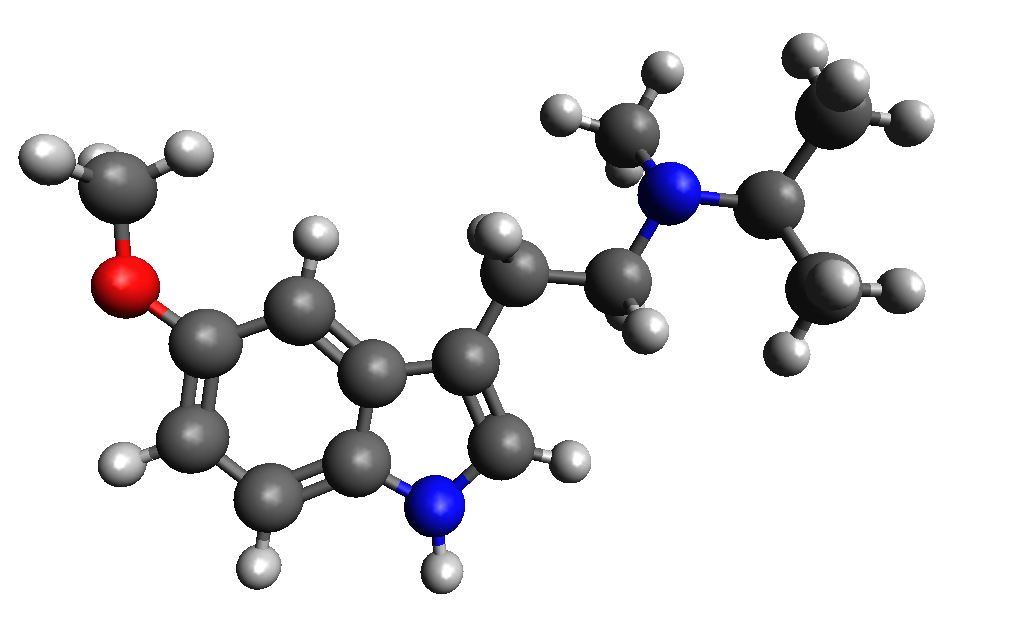

Clinical data
- Other names: 5-Methoxy-N-methyl-N-isopropyltryptamine; Moxy; Moxie; MSD-001; MSD001
- Routes of administration: Oral, smoking
- Drug class: Non-selective serotonin receptor agonist; Serotonin 5-HT_{2A} receptor agonist; Serotonergic psychedelic; Hallucinogen; Entactogen
- ATC code: None

Legal status
- Legal status: BR: Class F2 (Prohibited psychotropics); UK: Class A

Pharmacokinetic data
- Metabolism: CYP2D6
- Onset of action: Oral: 30 min (15–45 min); Oral, peak: 1–3 hours
- Elimination half-life: ~2–3 hours
- Duration of action: Oral: 4–6 hours or 3–8 hours Smoked: 2–5 hours

Identifiers
- IUPAC name: N-[2-(5-methoxy-1H-indol-3-yl)ethyl]-N-methylpropan-2-amine
- CAS Number: 96096-55-8
- PubChem CID: 2763156
- ChemSpider: 2043845
- UNII: L0P1807EUY
- ChEMBL: ChEMBL172139
- CompTox Dashboard (EPA): DTXSID90242114
- ECHA InfoCard: 100.223.426

Chemical and physical data
- Formula: C_{15}H_{22}N_{2}O
- Molar mass: 246.354 g·mol^{−1}
- 3D model (JSmol): Interactive image
- Melting point: 100 to 244 °C (212 to 471 °F) (free base); 162 to 163 °C (324 to 325 °F) (hydrochloride)
- SMILES: O(c1cc2c(cc1)[nH]cc2CCN(C(C)C)C)C
- InChI: InChI=1S/C15H22N2O/c1-11(2)17(3)8-7-12-10-16-15-6-5-13(18-4)9-14(12)15/h5-6,9-11,16H,7-8H2,1-4H3; Key:HEDOODBJFVUQMS-UHFFFAOYSA-N

5-MeO-MiPT, also known as 5-methoxy-N-methyl-N-isopropyltryptamine or by its nickname Moxy, is an atypical psychedelic drug of the tryptamine and 5-methoxytryptamine families. It has unique and unusual effects compared to other psychedelic tryptamines. At low doses, its effects include stimulation, tactile and sexual enhancement, some MDMA-like entactogenic effects, and introspective and mild perceptual changes with few or no psychedelic visuals or time dilation, whereas at higher doses, it produces 5-MeO-DMT-like classical psychedelic effects. It is usually taken orally or smoked.

The drug acts as a non-selective serotonin receptor agonist, including of the serotonin 5-HT_{1A}, 5-HT_{2A}, and 5-HT_{2C} receptors, among others. It is closely related in chemical structure and effects to 5-MeO-DiPT, and is also related to other tryptamines like 5-MeO-DMT, 4-HO-MiPT, and MiPT.

5-MeO-MiPT was first described in the literature by Alexander Shulgin and David Repke and colleagues in 1985. It was later described by Shulgin in greater detail in his 1997 book TiHKAL (Tryptamines I Have Known and Loved). The drug was encountered as a novel designer drug in 2004. Recreational use of 5-MeO-MiPT is significant but relatively rare. It is often used as a substitute for 5-MeO-DiPT, which has similar effects but became a controlled substance in the United States in 2003. The Drug Enforcement Administration (DEA) proposed banning 5-MeO-MiPT as well in the 2020s, but later withdrew its proposal amid public opposition. 5-MeO-MiPT, under the developmental code name MSD-001, is being developed for the treatment of psychiatric disorders by Mindstate Design Labs and is in phase 1 clinical trials for this purpose as of 2025.

== Use and effects ==
In his book TiHKAL (Tryptamines I Have Known and Loved), Alexander Shulgin lists the dose of 5-MeO-MiPT as 4 to 6 mg orally and 12 to 20 mg smoked. A wider recreational dose range of 0.5 to 20 mg or more orally has also been reported however. Oral doses of 1 to 3 mg have been described as light, 3 to 8 mg as common or moderate, and 8 to 12 mg as strong. Its onset of action when taken orally is described as very rapid, occurring within 15 to 45 minutes, peak effects appear to occur after around 1 to 2 hours, and its duration as 4 to 6 hours. However, other sources state its duration as 3 to 8 hours. A clinical trial confirmed that 5-MeO-MiPT has an onset of about 30 minutes and that peak effects occur after about 1.5 to 2 hours. Its duration smoked is said to be 2 to 5 hours.

5-MeO-MiPT has been described as having unique and unusual effects relative to other psychedelic tryptamines. The effects of 5-MeO-MiPT differ depending on whether it is taken orally or smoked and are highly dose-dependent. When taken orally at relatively low doses like 4 to 6 mg, it is usually described as not producing psychedelic visuals or related sensory effects and as producing only hints of time dilation. However, it is said to produce a stoned state that includes an ease of interpretive fantasy, dream-like perception, intense conceptual thought and philosophical thinking, and mild perceptual effects like altered depth perception, minor wave pattern in peripheral vision, and slightly enhanced auditory acuity. Moreover, the drug is described as producing stimulation, greatly enhanced tactile sensation and eroticism, enhanced music appreciation, tingling, shakes, and mild motor impairment. Its head space is described as relatively "shallow", less confusing, and more easily tolerated compared to classical psychedelics. Its effects have been described by users variably as both pleasant and negative.

When smoked, 5-MeO-MiPT is described as having effects similar in many regards to those of 5-MeO-DMT. These effects of smoked 5-MeO-MiPT include a powerful rush (but less intense than 5-MeO-DMT), loss of coherent thought, not much in the way of visuals, closed-eye visuals of moving and colored geometric patterns, intense waves of mental imagery of emotionally infused memories, impressive recall of early memories, intense depersonalization or disorientation of the normal sense of being a person in a body, loss of immediate contact with surroundings, emotional lability including laughing, crying, and vocal outbursts, groaning, writhing, shaking around, and general disorientation. It is described as having a very rapid onset, with the peak phase lasting less than 30 minutes and waves continuing for up to a few hours. It was described by one user as feeling like a hybrid between diethyltryptamine (DET) and 5-MeO-DMT.

5-MeO-MiPT is also known by its nickname "Moxy" and is closely related both in terms of chemical structure and effects to 5-MeO-DiPT (also known as "Foxy Methoxy"). These two serotonergic tryptamines at low doses have been described as very aphrodisiac and much more stimulant-like and party drugs than classical psychedelics. However, they have been described as not innately aphrodisiac, but instead as enhancing tactile sensation in a way that lends itself to sex. Matthew Baggott has described 5-MeO-MiPT as having some MDMA-like entactogenic effects at low doses, including tactile enhancement and feelings of empathy, intimacy, and closeness with others, and as producing classical psychedelic effects at higher doses.

Mindstate Design Labs has described 5-MeO-MiPT as the "least psychedelic psychedelic that's psychoactive". It is described as being quite psychoactive, but as lacking "hallucinations" and as not producing "mind-bending trips". The drug was assessed at five different doses (up to at least 10 mg) by oral administration in a phase 1 clinical trial in 47 individuals. Its effects were minimal at 0.5 to 1 mg orally and were most consistent at doses of 6 to 10 mg orally. The effects included heightened emotions, euphoria and relaxation, associative thinking, enhanced imagination, and perceptual or visual effects such as brighter colors. However, there were no "hallucinations", self-disintegration, oceanic boundlessness, or other typical features of psychedelic experiences. Its onset was 30 minutes, its peak of effects was 1.5 to 3 hours, and its duration was 6 hours. Mindstate Design Labs has hypothesized that a mild psychedelic experience, as with 5-MeO-MiPT, could still provide therapeutic benefits without overt hallucinogenic effects.

In addition to its use on its own, 5-MeO-MiPT, along with the related tryptamine psychedelic 4-HO-MET, is employed as a component of the MDMA-mimicking Borax combo.

== Side effects ==
Adverse effects of 5-MeO-MiPT include loss of appetite and insomnia. It produced no meaningful cardiovascular or psychiatric adverse effects in a phase 1 clinical trial, including no anxiety. Low-dose 5-MeO-MiPT did not cause any serious histopathological effects on the liver, kidney, and brain. High doses induce apoptotic cell death through caspase activity especially in some parts of the organs. There is no known documentation of death attributed to the use of 5-MeO-MiPT alone.

== Pharmacology ==
=== Pharmacodynamics ===
5-MeO-MiPT activities
Target	Affinity (K_{i}, nM)
5-HT_{1A}	12–143 (K_{i}); 37–>10,000 (EC_{50}); 108–109% (E_{max})
5-HT_{1B}	303–728
5-HT_{1D}	23–103
5-HT_{1E}	3,496–>10,000
5-HT_{1F}	ND
5-HT_{2A}	113–449 (K_{i}); 5.9–566 (EC_{50}); 82–107% (E_{max})
5-HT_{2B}	53–59 (K_{i}); 44–1,500 (EC_{50}); 12–88% (E_{max})
5-HT_{2C}	790–2,186 (K_{i}); 39–745 (EC_{50}); 90–115% (E_{max})
5-HT_{3}	>10,000
5-HT_{4}	ND
5-HT_{5A}	953–>10,000
5-HT_{6}	130–281
5-HT_{7}	20–122
α_{1A}	>12,000
α_{1B}	>10,000
α_{2A}	175–>10,000
α_{2B}	1,693–>10,000
α_{2C}	637–2174
β_{1}–β_{2}	>10,000
D_{1}	>25,000
D_{2}	>25,000
D_{3}	2,470–>25,000
D_{4}	1,422–6,331
D_{5}	>10,000
H_{1}	3,900–>10,000
H_{2}–H_{4}	>10,000
I_{1}	879
TAAR_{1}	>15,000 (rat/mouse)
σ_{1}	1,666–>10,000
σ_{2}	90–918
SERT	3,300–>10,000 (K_{i}); 2,680–29,768 (IC_{50}) >100,000 (EC_{50})
NET	>22,000 (K_{i}); 84,000 (IC_{50}) >100,000 (EC_{50})
DAT	>26,000 (K_{i}) >100,000 (IC_{50}) >100,000 (EC_{50})
Notes: The smaller the value, the more avidly the drug interacts with the site. Refs:

The mechanism that produces the hallucinogenic effects of 5-MeO-MiPT is thought to result primarily from serotonin 5-HT_{2A} receptor agonism combined with the 5-HT_{1A} receptor activation. 5-MeO-MiPT also potently binds to 5-HT_{2B} receptor with high affinity but low efficacy, 5-HT_{2C} receptors with moderate potency, and displays sub-micromolar affinity towards multiple other serotonin receptors.

The drug generally displays higher binding affinity for the 5-HT_{1A} over 5-HT_{2A} receptor. It was also included in the group of 5-methoxytryptamines for which computational docking analyses predicted a more favorable interaction in the 5-HT_{1A} binding pocket compared to 5-HT_{2A} receptor. In contrast, assays yielded a wide range of results, with some showing comparable and one no activity up to 10 μM concentrations. A 2024 BRET in vitro functional assay measuring G protein dissociation in humans found the drug to be one the few 5-HT_{2A}-preferring 5-methoxytryptamines with a roughly 2-fold higher potency. In mice, 5‑MeO‑MiPT produces hypothermia at high doses (30 mg/kg.)

In addition to the serotonin receptors, 5-MeO-MiPT has also been found to show significant affinity to the serotonin transporter (SERT) and norepinephrine transporter (NET), thereby acting as a moderately potent serotonin–norepinephrine reuptake inhibitor (SNRI). However, subsequent research contradicted the preceding findings and found that 5-MeO-MiPT did not significantly bind to or inhibit the human monoamine transporters. The drug is also inactive as a monoamine releasing agent.

Aside from those targets 5-MeO-MiPT was found to bind with sub-micromolar affinity to σ_{2}, α_{2}-adrenergic, and imidazoline-1 receptors.

==== Neurotoxicity ====
5-MeO-MiPT has been found to produce neurotoxicity at high (2.7 mg/kg) but not low (0.27 mg/kg) doses in mice. The drug itself does not appear to have been studied, but the closely related drug 5-MeO-DiPT has been found to produce serotonergic neurotoxicity, genotoxicity, and associated cognitive deficits in rodents. Other psychedelics have also been found to produce neurotoxicity in preclinical research.

=== Pharmacokinetics ===
==== Absorption ====
Following intraperitoneal administration of 5-MeO-MiPT at doses of 2.7 mg/kg in mice the compound was detectable in blood, kidney, liver, and brain. At lower doses of 0.27 mg/kg, concentrations of the parent compound remained below the limit of quantification in all samples.

In one human case report 5-MeO-MiPT concentrations were measured at 160 ng/mL in blood and 3,380 ng/mL in urine samples collected approximately one and two hours post-exposure, respectively.

The time to peak levels of 5-MeO-MiPT taken orally in humans is 1 to 2 hours.

==== Distribution ====
In silico ADMET predictions projected high jejunal permeability and very high kidney permeability in MDCK cells, which suggests efficient gastrointestinal absorption and renal filtration. The compound demonstrated nearly complete blood-brain barrier penetration (99% predicted), and was not predicted to be a substrate for P-glycoprotein, or organic anion transporters. The predicted human percent unbound to blood plasma proteins was 45.5%, compared to 31.6% in mice. The predicted volume of distribution (Vd) for 5-MeO-MiPT was 3.743 L/kg, lower than its structural analogue 5-MeO-DiPT (4.219 L/kg) and DMT (4.396 L/kg).

==== Metabolism ====
5-MeO-MiPT undergoes extensive phase I hepatic metabolism, mediated by cytochrome P450 enzymes. In vitro experiments using pooled human liver microsomes identified seven phase I metabolites, of which five were found in vivo. The major metabolic pathways include O-demethylation, N-demethylation, hydroxylation, and N-oxide formation. The metabolic profile of 5-MeO-MiPT shows similarity to the structurally related compound 5-MeO-DiPT. 5-MeO-MiPT is metabolized by CYP2D6 in humans, with CYP2D6 poor metabolizers showing 1.6- to 1.8-fold higher exposure and longer elimination half-life than extensive metabolizers.

In vivo analysis of forensic case sample identified five phase I metabolites in blood and seven in urine. The metabolites detected in both blood and urine included 5-MeO-NiPT, 5-HO-MiPT, 5-MeO-MiPT-N-oxide, and HO-5-MeO-MiPT. Two additional phase II metabolites (glucuronides) were found in mice and in vitro models, but not in human urine sample.

In silico ADMET predicted the compound to be a substrate but not an inhibitor for the CYP1A2 and CYP2C9 enzymes, and a substrate for CYP2A6 and CYP2B6. Additionally, the compound is predicted to be both a substrate and inhibitor for the CYP2D6 enzyme.

Detection of multiple metabolites in human urine sample two hours post-exposure, along with measurable blood concentrations at one hour, suggest relatively rapid metabolism and elimination. Renal excretion is likely a major route of elimination.

==== Elimination ====
The elimination half-life of 5-MeO-MiPT is approximately 2 to 3 hours.

== Chemistry ==
5-MeO-MiPT, also known as 5-methoxy-N-methyl-N-isopropyltryptamine, is a substituted tryptamine, 5-methoxytryptamine, and N,N-dialkyltryptamine. It is the N-methyl-N-isopropyl homologue of 5-MeO-DMT (5-methoxy-N,N-dimethyltryptamine).

=== Properties ===
5-MeO-MiPT free base is a solid and is said to be a white or yellow crystalline powder or to be light to dark orange in color. It has a bitter taste. The molecular weight of the free base is 246.35 g/mol, while the molecular weight of the hydrochloride salt is 282.81 g/mol.

The melting point of 5-MeO-MiPT free base is said to be between 100 and 150 °C or to be 243.7 °C, while the melting point of 5-MeO-MiPT hydrochloride is 162 to 163 °C.

5-MeO-MiPT free base is soluble in dimethylformamide (DMF) (30 mg/mL), dimethyl sulfoxide (DMSO) (30 mg/mL), and ethanol (30 mg/mL). 5-MeO-MiPT free base dissolves in organic solvents like chloroform, ether, benzene, and acetone but not in water, while 5-MeO-MiPT salts like 5-MeO-MiPT hydrochloride and 5-MeO-MiPT sulfate dissolve in water but not in organic solvents.

The chemical stability of 5-MeO-MiPT as a crystalline solid at –20 °C is reported to be at least 5 years.

=== Synthesis ===
The chemical synthesis of 5-MeO-MiPT has been described.

=== Analogues ===
Analogues of 5-MeO-MiPT include methylisopropyltryptamine (MiPT), 4-HO-MiPT (miprocin), 4-AcO-MiPT (mipracetin), NB-5-MeO-MiPT, 5-MeO-DMT, 5-MeO-DiPT, 5-MeO-DALT, 5-MeO-MET, 5-MeO-MPT, 5-MeO-MsBT, 5-MeO-EiPT, 5-MeO-PiPT, and 5-MeO-iPALT (ASR-3001), among others.

==== Positional isomers ====
6-MeO-MiPT and 7-MeO-MiPT are positional isomers of 5-MeO-MiPT. They have been described by Alexander Shulgin as being inactive at doses of up to 50 mg and 70 mg orally, respectively. Another notable positional isomer is 4-MeO-MiPT.

=== Detection ===
5-MeO-MiPT causes the ehrlich reagent to turn purple then fade to faint blue. It causes the marquis reagent to go yellow through to black.

== History ==
5-MeO-MiPT was first described in the scientific literature by Alexander Shulgin and David Repke and colleagues in 1985. It was later described by Shulgin in greater detail in his 1997 book TiHKAL (Tryptamines I Have Known and Loved). The drug was encountered as a novel designer drug in 2004. The United States Drug Enforcement Administration (DEA) proposed banning 5-MeO-MiPT in the 2020s, but this proposal was later withdrawn. The effort to make 5-MeO-MiPT a controlled substance was prominently opposed by the psychedelic community.

== Society and culture ==
=== Legal status ===
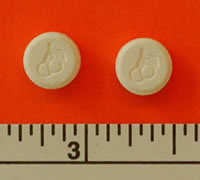
Two tablets of 5-MeO-MiPT.

==== Canada ====
5-MeO-MiPT is not an explicitly nor implicitly controlled substance in Canada as of 2025.

==== China ====
As of September–October 2015, China lists 5-MeO-MiPT as a controlled substance.

==== Europe ====
Finland includes it in its decree banning certain psychoactive substances from the consumer market. In Luxembourg it is not listed among prohibited substances, making it not illegal but a legal gray area there.

==== United Kingdom ====
In the United Kingdom, it is classified as a Class A drug along with most ethers of ring-hydroxy tryptamines.

==== United States ====
In the United States, it is unscheduled at the federal level, but may be treated as an analogue of 5-MeO-DiPT under the Federal Analog Act therefore if it is sold for human consumption and not for medical or scientific uses is illegal and prosecuted.

At the state level, "5-Methoxy-N-methyl-N-isopropyltryptamine" is classified as a Schedule I controlled substance in Florida, prohibiting its purchase, consumption, sale, or possession.

== Research ==
5-MeO-MiPT, under the developmental code name MSD-001, is being developed for the treatment of psychiatric disorders. It is under development specifically by Mindstate Design Labs. As of October 2025, the drug is in phase 1 clinical trials in the United States and European Union. A phase 1 trial was completed in July 2025. Mindstate Design Labs has developed an artificial intelligence (AI) platform known as Osmanthus to analyze trip reports in order to identify relationships between receptor interactions and psychoactive effects. Other research of this sort has also been conducted and published by other groups. Mindstate Design Labs's platform has processed 70,000 online trip reports and led to the selection of 5-MeO-MiPT for development. According to its developer, 5-MeO-MiPT is intended as a "neutral base compound" with mild effects on its own for use as a sort of "psychedelic tofu" in combination with other drugs to precisely modulate serotonin receptors and create various unique altered states of consciousness.

== See also ==
- Substituted tryptamine
- Stimulant § Serotonin 5-HT_{2A} receptor agonists
- List of investigational hallucinogens and entactogens
