= 4-HO-McPT =

Chemical compound

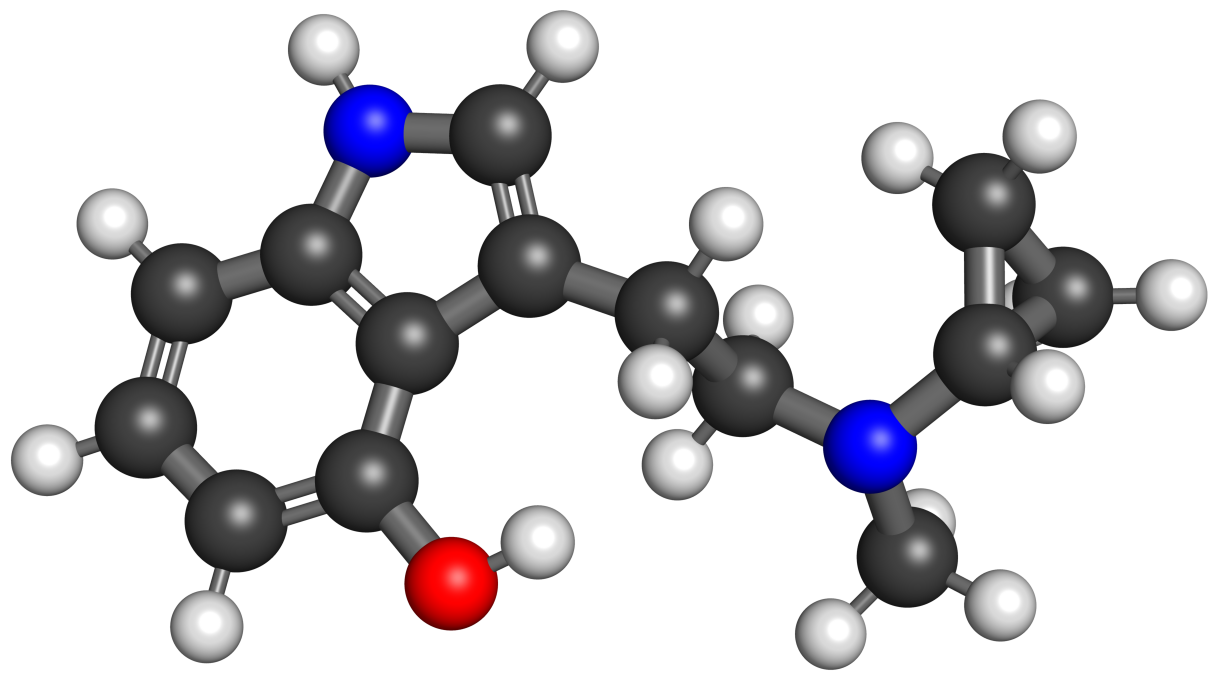

Clinical data
- Other names: 4-Hydroxy-N-methyl-N-cyclopropyltryptamine
- Routes of administration: Oral
- Drug class: Serotonergic psychedelic; Hallucinogen
- ATC code: None

Identifiers
- IUPAC name: 3-[2-[cyclopropyl(methyl)amino]ethyl]-1H-indol-4-ol
- CAS Number: 2883663-05-4
- PubChem CID: 155253443
- CompTox Dashboard (EPA): DTXSID001341968

Chemical and physical data
- Formula: C_{14}H_{18}N_{2}O
- Molar mass: 230.311 g·mol^{−1}
- 3D model (JSmol): Interactive image
- SMILES: CN(CCC1=CNC2=C1C(=CC=C2)O)C3CC3
- InChI: InChI=1S/C14H18N2O/c1-16(11-5-6-11)8-7-10-9-15-12-3-2-4-13(17)14(10)12/h2-4,9,11,15,17H,5-8H2,1H3; Key:GFVJBFIXZYLVPO-UHFFFAOYSA-N

4-HO-McPT, also known as 4-hydroxy-N-methyl-N-cyclopropyltryptamine, is a psychedelic tryptamine derivative. It has serotonergic effects, and has reportedly been sold as a designer drug since around 2016, but was not definitively identified by forensic laboratories until 2018.

== Pharmacology ==
4-HO-McPT produces the head-twitch response, a behavioral proxy of psychedelic effects, in rodents. It has been found to act as a serotonin reuptake inhibitor.

== Chemistry ==
=== Analogues ===
Analogues of 4-HO-McPT include methylcyclopropyltryptamine (McPT), N-cyclopropyltryptamine (NcPT), 4-AcO-McPT, 5-MeO-McPT, 4-HO-McPeT, 4-HO-MiPT, 4-HO-MALT, 4-HO-MiPT, 4-HO-MPT, and 4-HO-EPT, among others.

== Society and culture ==
=== Legal status ===
==== Finland ====
4-HO-McPT is illegal in Finland.

== See also ==
- Substituted tryptamine
