= Propylisopropyltryptamine =

Chemical compound

PiPT

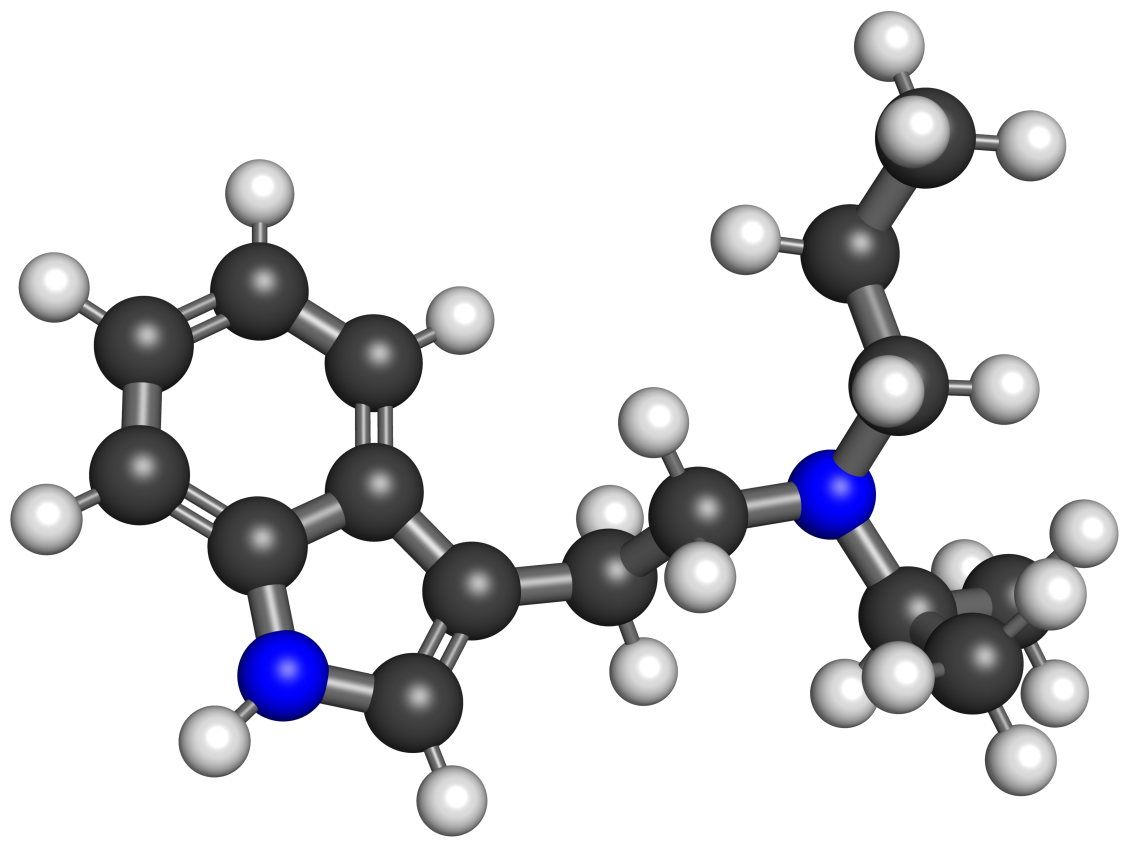

Clinical data
- Other names: PiPT; N-Propyl-N-isopropyltryptamine
- Drug class: Serotonergic psychedelic; Hallucinogen
- ATC code: none

Identifiers
- IUPAC name: [2-(1H-indol-3-yl)ethyl]-N-propyl-N-isopropylamine
- CAS Number: 1354632-00-0
- PubChem CID: 57464898
- ChemSpider: 21106369
- UNII: Q2Y9D5Q4T4
- CompTox Dashboard (EPA): DTXSID20726699

Chemical and physical data
- Formula: C_{16}H_{24}N_{2}
- Molar mass: 244.382 g·mol^{−1}
- 3D model (JSmol): Interactive image
- SMILES: CC(C)N(CCC)CCc2c[nH]c1ccccc12
- InChI: InChI=1S/C16H24N2/c1-4-10-18(13(2)3)11-9-14-12-17-16-8-6-5-7-15(14)16/h5-8,12-13,17H,4,9-11H2,1-3H3; Key:OFXPLOPRCQJJFP-UHFFFAOYSA-N

Propylisopropyltryptamine (PiPT), also known as N-propyl-N-isopropyltryptamine, is a psychedelic drug of the tryptamine family. It reportedly produces hallucinogenic effects that resemble those of other related dialkyl tryptamine derivatives, although PiPT is reportedly relatively weak and short-lasting. It has been sold as a designer drug, first being identified in 2021 in British Columbia, Canada.

== Use and effects ==
According to Alexander Shulgin in his 1997 book TiHKAL (Tryptamines I Have Known and Loved), PiPT had not yet been evaluated.

== Chemistry ==
PiPT is short for N-propyl-N-isopropyltryptamine. PiPT is a tryptamine, which all belong to a larger family of compounds known as indolethylamines

=== Analogues ===
Analogues of PiPT include methylisopropyltryptamine (MiPT), ethylisopropyltryptamine (EiPT), diisopropyltryptamine (DiPT), and dipropyltryptamine (DPT), among others.

== Society and culture ==
=== Legal status ===
==== Canada ====
PiPT is not a controlled substance in Canada as of 2025.

==== United States ====
PiPT is not an explicitly controlled substance in the United States. However, it could be considered a controlled substance under the Federal Analogue Act if intended for human consumption.

== See also ==
- Substituted tryptamine
