= MiPT =

Chemical compound

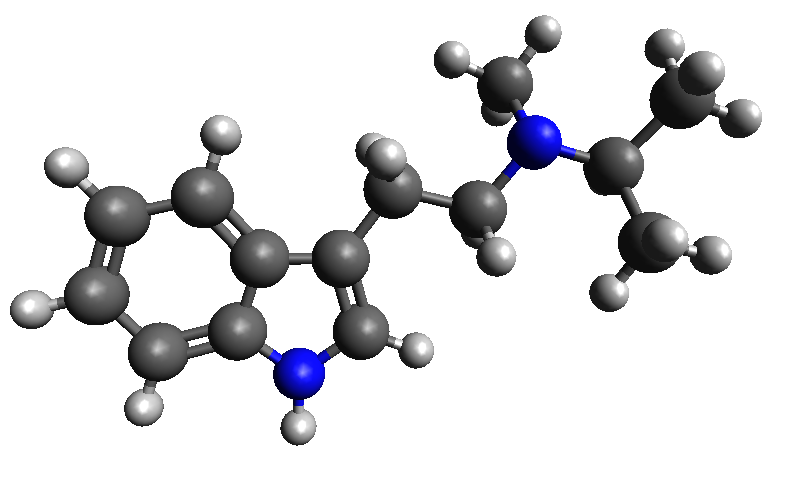

Clinical data
- Other names: MiPT; N-Methyl-N-isopropyltryptamine
- Routes of administration: Oral
- Drug class: Serotonin receptor modulator; Serotonin 5-HT_{2A} receptor agonist; Serotonergic psychedelic; Hallucinogen
- ATC code: None

Legal status
- Legal status: AU: Unscheduled; CA: Unscheduled; DE: NpSG (Industrial and scientific use only); UK: Class A; US: Unscheduled

Pharmacokinetic data
- Onset of action: Oral: 30 minutes Insufflation: <1 minute
- Duration of action: 3–4 hours

Identifiers
- IUPAC name: N-[2-(1H-indol-3-yl)ethyl]-N-methylpropan-2-amine
- CAS Number: 96096-52-5
- PubChem CID: 29935323
- ChemSpider: 21106353
- UNII: JO3SCR302A
- ChEMBL: ChEMBL353728
- CompTox Dashboard (EPA): DTXSID901024777

Chemical and physical data
- Formula: C_{14}H_{20}N_{2}
- Molar mass: 216.328 g·mol^{−1}
- 3D model (JSmol): Interactive image
- SMILES: CC(C)N(C)CCc1c[nH]c2ccccc12
- InChI: InChI=1S/C14H20N2/c1-11(2)16(3)9-8-12-10-15-14-7-5-4-6-13(12)14/h4-7,10-11,15H,8-9H2,1-3H3; Key:KTQJVAJLJZIKKD-UHFFFAOYSA-N

Methylisopropyltryptamine (MiPT), also known as N-methyl-N-isopropyltryptamine, is a psychedelic drug of the tryptamine family related to other psychedelics like dimethyltryptamine (DMT) and diisopropyltryptamine (DiPT). It is taken orally.

The drug acts as a serotonin receptor modulator, including as an agonist of the serotonin 5-HT_{2A} receptor. Derivatives of MiPT include 4-HO-MiPT (miprocin) and 5-MeO-MiPT (moxy).

MiPT was first described by David Repke and colleagues in 1981. It was subsequently evaluated and described in Alexander Shulgin's 1997 book TiHKAL (Tryptamines I Have Known and Loved). MiPT was encountered as a novel designer drug by 2005.

== Use and effects ==
In his book TiHKAL (Tryptamines I Have Known and Loved), Alexander Shulgin lists MiPT's dose as 10 to 25 mg orally and its duration as 3 to 4 hours. A dose of 20 mg by insufflation was also reported. Its onset orally was reported to be 30 minutes and peak effects occurred at 1 hour. Conversely, its onset via insufflation was said to be immediate or less than 1 minute. Oral doses of up to 20 mg were described as being relatively mild in their effects. MiPT is notable in being the most potent of the simple N,N-dialkyltryptamines, at least via oral administration.

The effects of MiPT have been reported to include feeling "definitely psychedelic", being very "heady" (perhaps as in "psychedelic headspace"), effects on thoughts that were typically psychedelic, enhancement of visual field such as brighter colors and more clearly defined objects, vision tinted orange as if there was an orange overlay, an almost total absence of any other visual effects (including no wave-forms, color distortion, object shape changes, or closed-eye imagery), auditory effects such as enhanced sound discrimination, hearing and skin being more sensitive, and minor sensory changes in general. It was said to emphasize "psychedelic" effects over "hallucinogenic" effects. Other effects included feeling good, excitement, stimulation, feeling alert, restlessness, and trailing insomnia for 6 to 8 hours. Physical effects included pupil dilation, dizziness, dry mouth, and muscle tension.

== Pharmacology ==
=== Pharmacodynamics ===
MiPT acts as a serotonin receptor modulator. It shows affinity for the serotonin 5-HT_{2A}, 5-HT_{1A}, and 5-HT_{2B} receptors. The drug acts as a potent partial agonist of the serotonin 5-HT_{2A} receptor. It shows weak affinity for the serotonin transporter (SERT) and vesicular monoamine transporter 2 (VMAT2), but does not act as a monoamine reuptake inhibitor or releasing agent even at very high concentrations.

== Chemistry ==
=== Properties ===
MiPT base, unlike many other tryptamines in their freebase form, does not decompose rapidly in the presence of light or oxygen.

=== Crystal structure ===
In August 2019, Chadeayne et al. solved the crystal structure of fumarate salt of MiPT.

=== Synthesis ===
The chemical synthesis of MiPT has been described.

=== Analogues ===
Analogues of MiPT include 4-HO-MiPT, 4-AcO-MiPT, 5-MeO-MiPT, 4,5-MDO-MiPT, 5,6-MDO-MiPT, methylethyltryptamine (MET), methylpropyltryptamine (MPT), ethylisopropyltryptamine (EiPT), propylisopropyltryptamine (PiPT), dimethyltryptamine (DMT), diisopropyltryptamine (DiPT), and MiPBF, among others.

== History ==
MiPT was first synthesized and described by David Repke and colleagues in 1981. Subsequently, MiPT was further described by Alexander Shulgin in his 1997 book TiHKAL (Tryptamines I Have Known and Loved). The drug was encountered as a novel designer drug in Europe by 2005.

== Society and culture ==
=== Legal status ===
==== Canada ====
MiPT is not a controlled substance in Canada as of 2025.

==== Sweden ====
Sweden's public health agency suggested classifying MiPT as a hazardous substance, on May 15, 2019.

==== United States ====
In the United States, MiPT not an explicitly controlled substance. However, as an isomer of diethyltryptamine (DET), it may be considered a Schedule I controlled substance similarly. In addition, the purchase, sale, or possession for human consumption of MiPT could be prosecuted under the Federal Analogue Act.

== See also ==
- Substituted tryptamine
- ASR-3001 (5-MeO-iPALT)
- 2C-T-17
