= 4-HO-DBT =

Psychedelic drug

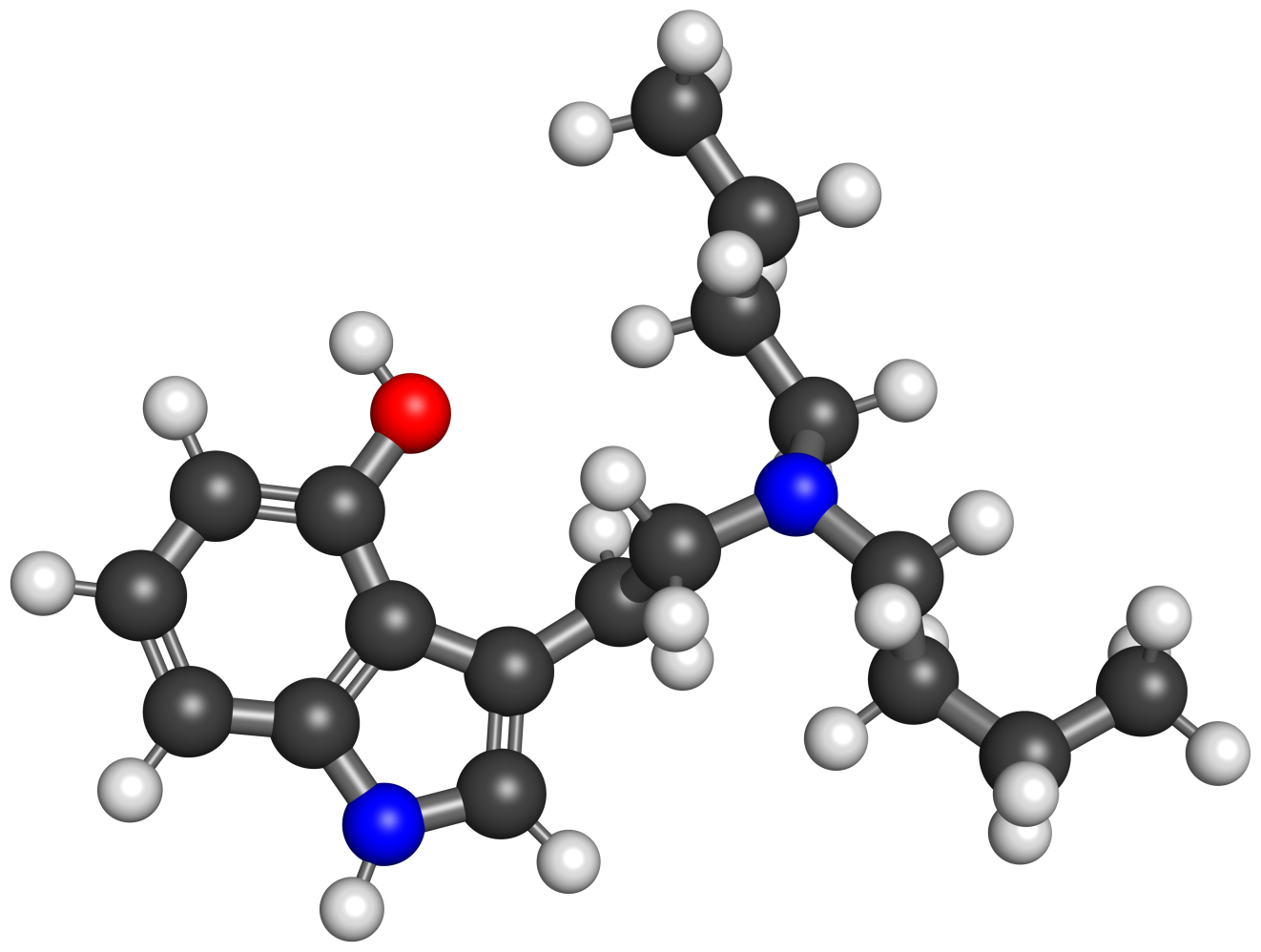

Clinical data
- Other names: 4-OH-DBT; 4-Hydroxy-N,N-dibutyltryptamine
- Routes of administration: Oral
- Drug class: Serotonergic psychedelic; Hallucinogen
- ATC code: None

Identifiers
- IUPAC name: N-butyl-N-[2-(4-hydroxy-1H-indol-3-yl)ethyl]butan-1-amine
- CAS Number: 63065-89-4
- PubChem CID: 21854224
- ChemSpider: 10579818
- UNII: R3EY4G4BLQ

Chemical and physical data
- Formula: C_{18}H_{28}N_{2}O
- Molar mass: 288.435 g·mol^{−1}
- 3D model (JSmol): Interactive image
- Melting point: 74 to 75 °C (165 to 167 °F)
- SMILES: CCCCN(CCCC)CCc2c[nH]c1cccc(O)c12
- InChI: InChI=1S/C18H28N2O/c1-3-5-11-20(12-6-4-2)13-10-15-14-19-16-8-7-9-17(21)18(15)16/h7-9,14,19,21H,3-6,10-13H2,1-2H3; Key:BDOJPNJIBDXWQQ-UHFFFAOYSA-N

4-HO-DBT, also known as 4-hydroxy-N,N-dibutyltryptamine, is a psychedelic drug of the tryptamine family related to psilocin (4-HO-DMT). It is taken orally.

== Use and effects ==
In his book TiHKAL (Tryptamines I Have Known and Loved), Alexander Shulgin reported that a 20 mg dose of 4-HO-DBT orally produced no effects. However, this compound has subsequently been sold as a "research chemical" and anecdotal reports suggest that at higher doses 4-HO-DBT is indeed an active hallucinogen, although somewhat weaker than other similar tryptamine derivatives.

== Chemistry ==
=== Properties ===
4-HO-DBT is found either as its crystalline hydrochloride salt or as an oily or crystalline base.

=== Synthesis ===
The chemical synthesis of 4-HO-DBT has been described.

=== Isomers ===
Several different isomers of 4-HO-DBT could be made, including 4-HO-DiBT, 4-HO-DsBT, and 4-HO-DtBT, but of these only the isobutyl isomer 4-HO-DiBT was synthesized by Alexander Shulgin (melting point 152 to 154 °C) and was also found to be inactive at a 20 mg dose. The serotonin receptor interactions of these isomers have been studied. 4-HO-DiBT showed 43-fold lower affinity and 4-HO-DsBT 6.5-fold lower affinity for the serotonin 5-HT_{2A} receptor compared to psilocin (4-HO-DMT).

Chemical structures of 4-HO-DBT and its skeletal isomers
4-HO-DBT

4-HO-DiBT

4-HO-DsBT

4-HO-DtBT

== History ==
4-HO-DBT was first described in the scientific literature by David Repke and colleagues in 1977. It was subsequently described in further detail by Alexander Shulgin in his 1997 book TiHKAL (Tryptamines I have Known and Loved).

== See also ==
- Substituted tryptamine
